= Mere Christianity =

1952 theological book by C. S. Lewis

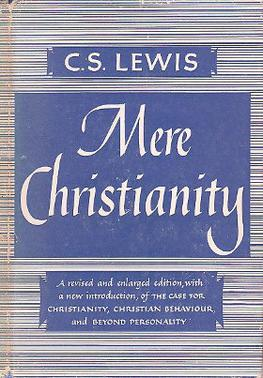
- Author: C. S. Lewis
- Language: English
- Genre: Christian apologetics
- Published: 7 July 1952
- Publisher: Geoffrey Bles
- Publication place: United Kingdom
- Media type: Print
- Pages: 175
- ISBN: 978-00-61350-21-4
- OCLC: 460348497
- Text: Mere Christianity online

Mere Christianity is a Christian apologetics book by the British author C. S. Lewis. It was adapted from a series of BBC radio talks made between 1941 and 1944, originally published as three separate volumes: Broadcast Talks (1942), Christian Behaviour (1943), and Beyond Personality (1944). The book consists of four parts: the first presents Lewis's arguments for the existence of God; the second contains his defence of Christian theology, including his notable "Liar, lunatic, or Lord" trilemma; the third has him exploring Christian ethics, among which are cardinal and theological virtues; in the final, he writes on the Christian conception of God.

Mere Christianity was published in the United Kingdom by Geoffrey Bles on 7 July 1952. While initial reviews to the book were generally positive, modern reviewers were more critical of it, and its overall reception was relatively mixed. The praise was primarily directed to Lewis's humorous, straightforward style of writing; the criticism was primarily around the validity of his trilemma, which defends the Christian doctrine of the divinity of Jesus, and how he should have considered providing more choices.

Deemed a classic in Lewis's career and religious literature, Mere Christianity has often received a wide readership decades following its release, and contributed to establishing its author's reputation as "one of the most 'original' exponents of the Christian faith" in the 20th century. The work, with Lewis's arguments for God's existence in it, continued to be examined in scholarly circles. Mere Christianity has retained popularity among Christians from various denominations, and appeared in several lists of finest Christian books. Often used as a tool of evangelism, it has been translated into over thirty languages, and cited by a number of public figures as their influence to their conversion to Christianity. Several "biographies" of the book have also been written.

== Background ==
After reading Lewis's The Problem of Pain James Welch, the Director of Religious Broadcasting for the BBC, wrote Lewis the following:

I write to ask whether you would be willing to help us in our work of religious broadcasting ... The microphone is a limiting, and rather irritating, instrument, but the quality of thinking and depth of conviction which I find in your book ought sure to be shared with a great many other people.

Welch suggested two potential subjects. Lewis responded with thanks and observed that modern literature, the first, did not suit him, choosing instead the Christian faith as Lewis understood it.

In the preface to later editions, Lewis described his desire to avoid contested theological doctrine by focusing on core beliefs of the Christian Faith.

Every Wednesday from 7:45 pm to 8 pm during August 1941, Lewis gave live talks entitled "Right or Wrong: A Clue to the Meaning of the Universe" which would become the first book in Mere Christianity. The first set of talks became very popular and flooded Lewis with responses from an adoring and irate public. This feedback led to Lewis's going back on air to answer listeners' questions.

The following January and February, Lewis gave the next set of talks on what would become "What Christians Believe". The talks remained popular and because of the success of the newly released The Screwtape Letters, Lewis's publisher was happy to publish the broadcast talks as books that year.

In Autumn 1942, the third series of talks were cut down from 15 to 10 minutes. Due to a miscommunication, Lewis had prepared for 15 minutes, but added the cut material back into the next book and added several more chapters.

The fourth set of talks did not take place until 1944. The script drafts had a much wider scope originally, and Lewis prepared for 10-minute talks when the BBC was giving him 15. The timing of these talks was important and strictly adhered to due to technology and World War II, Germany would broadcast propaganda through the English-spoken "Lord Hawhaw" during any dead air. Due to the timing of the fourth set of talks (10:20 pm), Lewis said he could not do them all live and would have to record some.

=== The Case for Christianity (Broadcast Talks in UK) ===
The core of the first section centres on an argument from morality, the basis of which is the "law of human nature", a "rule about right and wrong," which, Lewis maintained, is commonly available and known to all human beings. He cites, as an example, the case of Nazi Germany, writing:

This law was called the Law of nature because people thought that everyone knew it by nature and did not need to be taught it. They did not mean, of course, that you might not find an odd individual here and there who did not know it, just as you find a few people who are colour-blind or have no ear for a tune. But taking the race as a whole, they thought that the human idea of decent behaviour was obvious to everyone. And I believe they were right. If they were not, then all the things we said about the war were nonsense. What was the sense in saying the enemy were in the wrong unless Right is a real thing which the Nazis at bottom knew as well as we did and ought to have practised? If they had had no notion of what we mean by right, then, though we might still have had to fight them, we could no more have blamed them for that than for the colour of their hair.

On a mundane level, it is generally accepted that stealing is a violation of this moral law. Lewis argues that the moral law is like scientific laws (e.g. gravity) or mathematics in that it was not contrived by humans. However, it is unlike scientific laws in that it can be broken or ignored, and it is known intuitively, rather than through experimentation. After introducing the moral law, Lewis argues that thirst reflects the fact that people naturally need water, and there is no other substance which satisfies that need. Lewis points out that earthly experience does not satisfy the human craving for "joy" and that only God could fit the bill; humans cannot know to yearn for something if it does not exist.

After providing reasons for his conversion to theism, Lewis explicates various conceptions of God. Pantheism, he argues, is incoherent, and atheism too simple. Eventually, he arrives at Jesus Christ, and invokes a well-known argument now known as Lewis's trilemma. Lewis, arguing that Jesus was claiming to be God, uses logic to advance three possibilities: either Jesus really was God; Jesus was deliberately lying; or Jesus was not really God but only thought himself to be (which would make him delusional and likely insane).

The book goes on to say that the latter two possibilities are not consistent with Jesus' character and it was most likely that he was being truthful.

=== Christian Behaviour ===
The next third of the book explores the ethics resulting from Christian belief. He cites the four cardinal virtues: prudence, justice, temperance, and fortitude. After touching on these, he goes into the three theological virtues: hope, faith, and charity. Lewis also explains morality as being composed of three layers: relationships between man and man, the motivations and attitudes of the man himself, and contrasting worldviews.

Lewis also covers such topics as social relations and forgiveness, sexual ethics and the tenets of Christian marriage, and the relationship between morality and psychoanalysis. He also writes about the great sin: pride, which he argues to be the root cause of all evil and rebellion.

His most important point is that Christianity mandates that one "love your neighbour as yourself." He points out that all persons unconditionally love themselves. Even if one does not like oneself, one would still love oneself. Christians, he writes, must also apply this attitude to others, even if they do not like them. Lewis calls this one of the great secrets: when one acts as if he loves others, he will presently come to love them.

== Critical reception ==
Initial reviews of Mere Christianity generally show enthusiasm, and most of them were from Christian publications. However, combining them with the reviews published decades later indicated a more mixed reception. The historian Stephanie L. Derrick observed that the book's literary elements, such as its eloquence, were the aspect most frequently noted by contemporary publications. The historian George M. Marsden summarised that Mere Christianity "has been hated as well as loved. Nonetheless, as a popular presentation of the faith it has drawn less systematic criticism than would a book that purported to be a definitive treatise on Christian apologetics and theology." On the general reception to the book, the Lewis biographer Margaret Patterson Hannay described it as his "most popular and ... most disparaged" work, adding that "probably because its fans have spoken of it as a profound piece of theology, while it is, as was designed to be, only a primer".

Describing the book as "a rare gift", Edward Skillin of the Commonweal magazine commented of Lewis's ability to make "complicated matters" more accessible especially to laypeople. On a passage of the book, Edward D. Myers of Theology Today noted, "This is clear, it is simple, it is eminently Christian, and it is typical of the ease with which Mr. Lewis puts great matters into plain language." Joseph McSorley of The Catholic World found Lewis writing "with his customary clarity and incisiveness, and with proofs that the average man will find convincing. It is a delight to see him demolish in a paragraph many of the heresies which have contributed to our present ghastly condition." The Tablet, a Catholic magazine, wrote:

We have never read arguments better marshalled and handled so that they can be remembered, or any book more useful to the Christian, in the Army or elsewhere, who finds himself called upon to argue briefly from first premises, to say why morality is not herd-instinct, why there is a special and unique character attaching to the sense of obligation, why the conviction that there is a law of right and wrong and a transcendent morality is only intelligible if there is a God.

The Times Literary Supplement wrote of Lewis's "quite unique power" of making theology interesting, even "exciting and (one might almost say) uproariously funny". The reviewer added: "No writer of popular apologetics today is more effective than Mr. C. S. Lewis." The Clergy Review's G. D. Smith opined that Lewis "shows himself a master in the rare art of conveying profound truths in simple and compelling language". J. H. Homes of the New York Herald Tribune Weekly Book Review wrote that "his clarity of thought and simplicity of expression have a magic about them which makes plain the most abstruse problems of theological speculation". The Guardian said: "His learning is abundantly seasoned with common sense, his humor and his irony are always at the service of the most serious purposes, and his originality is the offspring of enthusiastically loyal orthodoxy."

"Mere Christianity is a popular, not an academic, book, which is not directed towards a readership of academic theologians or philosophers. It is simply unfair to expect Lewis to engage here with detailed philosophical debates, when these would clearly turn his brisk, highly readable book into a quagmire of fine philosophical distinctions. Mere Christianity is an informal handshake to begin a more formal acquaintance and conversation."

— Alister McGrath on the book's readability

The author Colin Duriez praised it as easy to understand, and the biographer Thomas C. Peters opined that his straightforward language makes the book fit to a wide audience. There had been also criticism, which was primarily directed towards Lewis's "Liar, lunatic, or Lord" trilemma. The Lewis biographer and Christian apologist Alister McGrath, while commending the book in general, felt that his trilemma is a weak defence for the doctrine of the divinity of Jesus, calling this the book's "most obvious concern". McGrath wrote that Lewis’ argument is mostly unsupported by modern biblical scholarship, and argued that other alternatives should have been included, such as that Jesus was mistaken about his identity.

Scathing criticism came from the philosopher John Beversluis, in his book C. S. Lewis and the Search for Rational Religion (1985). Beversluis analysed Lewis's arguments for Christianity, arriving in the conclusion that each of them is built on faulty logic. He argued that Lewis made his arguments convincing by creating false analogies, with an instance in his trilemma. Beversluis said there are more alternatives in addition to Jesus being a liar or lunatic, one of which is that his disciples misinterpreted his words. The philosopher Victor Reppert replied to Beversluis in C. S. Lewis's Dangerous Idea (2003), noting that Beversluis was correct in pointing out that many of Lewis's arguments are not strictly logical but overestimating the degree to which Lewis rested his case for Christianity on reason alone. Reppert continued that Lewis, in his autobiography, Surprised by Joy (1955), realised Christianity rests on far more than solely reason.

== Legacy ==
Mere Christianity has been referred to as a classic of Lewis's career, as well as of religious literature, particularly in the category of Christian apologetics. Commentators have also seen it as a guide to the basics of the Christian faith and to his theology. The book, along with his arguments for the existence of God, have frequently received academic evaluation, either complimenting or critical. Analysing Lewis's books, the Australian archeologist Warwick Ball believed Mere Christianity is perhaps his most influential and widely read apologetic work; the American philosopher C. Stephen Evans called his moral argument the "most widely-convincing apologetic argument of the twentieth century"; McGrath considered it "perhaps as outstanding an example of a lucid and intelligent presentation of the rational and moral case for Christian belief as we are ever likely to see".

Mere Christianity has retained popularity years after its publication, and has been compared to other well-known Christian works, including Augustine's The City of God and G. K. Chesterton's The Everlasting Man (1925). The BBC journalist Justin Phillips observed that it "continues to transform the lives of those who read it. There is no reason why it won't continue to be potent for decades to come." According to the authors Roger Lancelyn Green and Walter Hooper, its success led to the acknowledgment of Lewis as "one of the most 'original' exponents of the Christian faith" of the 20th century. The book, Hooper continued, shows Lewis's ability of providing a comprehensible guidance of the Christian beliefs/theology to everyone, and "has become synonymous with Lewis". The academic Bruce L. Edwards noted that it contributes to shaping Lewis's reputation as "a witty, articulate proponent of Christianity". The author Marvin D. Hinten wrote: "When people are asked which C. S. Lewis book has most influenced them spiritually, the most common answer is Mere Christianity."

According to Peters, the book is more popular among Christians of various denominations, including Catholic, Latter-day Saint, Orthodox, and Protestant, but less among non-Christians. It is often used as an evangelistic tool, predominantly in Christian-majority countries, including the United States, where its influence is most felt. Furthermore, its influence is strengthened by the publication of its translations; according to Marsden, it has been translated to about thirty-six languages. In the next decades, Mere Christianity is continued to be reprinted and sold by Christian and online booksellers. For instance, soon after the dissolution of the Soviet Union, it was translated into the several native languages of its breakaway states, which was done by Orthodox Christians to rebuild their influence. As of 2010, the book had been in BookScan Religion Bestseller's list for 513 weeks, consecutively. There is also a considerable readership in China, with 60,000 copies had been sold there as of 2014.

The book has also been cited by a number of public figures as their influence to their conversion, or re-conversion, to Christianity as well as other Christian denominations. The American geneticist Francis Collins related his story of conversion from atheism in his book, The Language of God (2006), and described Mere Christianity as having influenced him to embrace Christianity. The American attorney Charles Colson's conversion happened after him reading a copy of the book given by his friend, Thomas L. Phillips (the chairman of the board of the Raytheon Company). His story became popular, enhanced by the release of his autobiography in 1976, which was consequently declared the "Year of the Evangelicals" by the Newsweek magazine. Catholic converts include the British philanthropist Leonard Cheshire, the German economist E. F. Schumacher, the American author Sheldon Vanauken, the American columnist Ross Douthat, the American theologian Peter Kreeft, and the American philosopher Francis J. Beckwith.

Mere Christianity has been featured in several lists. It was included in the 2000 book, 100 Christian Books That Changed the Century, by William J. Petersen and Randy Petersen. In 2000 and 2006, the evangelical magazine Christianity Today's editorial board included Mere Christianity in its "Books of the Century" and "The Top 50 Books That Have Shaped Evangelicals", respectively. In a 2013 article to Christianity Today, McGrath ranked it the first among the five books by Lewis he liked the most. In the same year's "The Best Christian Book of All Time Tournament", run by InterVarsity Christian Fellowship, Mere Christianity was voted as the all-time, best Christian book, only after Augustine's autobiography Confessions. In 2018, Christianity Today's Greg Cootsona, a writer of the relationship between religion and science, featured it in his "5 Books That Bring Science and Christianity Together" listing.

Mere Christianity has influenced other Christian publications, with the scholar Gary L. Tandy noting that it remains the standard for assessing them, mainly the apologetic ones. Subsequent publications with allusion to the book in their titles include N. T. Wright's Simply Christian (2006) and McGrath's Mere Apologetics (2012). The American pastor Tim Keller referred to his apologetic The Reason for God (2012) as "Mere Christianity for dummies". The bimonthly ecumenical Christian magazine Touchstone, which started publication in 1986, is subtitled A Journal of Mere Christianity. Paul McCusker's C. S. Lewis & Mere Christianity, which provides insights to the work in its historical context, was published in 2014; it was praised for being well-researched but was criticised for its factual errors. Another "biography" of the book, C. S. Lewis's Mere Christianity, written by Marsden, was released in 2016, and received a positive reception from critics, with some criticism to its conclusion.

== Bibliography ==
- Ball, Warwick (2022). East of the Wardrobe: The Unexpected Worlds of C. S. Lewis. Oxford University Press. ISBN 978-01-97626-25-2.
- Brown, Devin (2013). A Life Observed: A Spiritual Biography of C. S. Lewis. Brazos Press. ISBN 978-1-58743-335-1.
- Derrick, Stephanie L. (2018). The Fame of C. S. Lewis: A Controversialist's Reception in Britain and America. Oxford University Press. ISBN 978-01-92551-51-1.
- Duriez, Colin (2013) [1990]. The A–Z of C. S. Lewis: An Encyclopedia of His Life, Thought and Writings (4th ed.). Lion Books. ISBN 978-0-7459-5586-5.
- Green, Roger Lancelyn; Hooper, Walter (1974). C. S. Lewis: A Biography. Harcourt Brace Jovanovich. ISBN 0-15-123190-7.
- Hannay, Margaret Patterson (1981). C. S. Lewis. Frederick Ungar Publishing. ISBN 0-8044-6242-9.
- Hooper, Walter (1996). C. S. Lewis: A Companion & Guide. HarperCollins. ISBN 0-06-063879-6.
- Lindsley, Arthur (2005). C. S. Lewis's Case for Christ: Insights from Reason, Imagination, and Faith. InterVarsity Press. ISBN 978-0-8308-3285-9.
- Marsden, George M. (2016). C. S. Lewis's Mere Christianity: A Biography. Princeton University Press. ISBN 978-06-91153-73-5.
- McGrath, Alister (2013). C. S. Lewis: Eccentric Genius, Reluctant Prophet. Tyndale House Publishers. ISBN 978-1-4143-3935-1.
- Miethe, Terry L. (1999). C. S. Lewis's Mere Christianity. B&H Publishing Group. ISBN 978-0-8054-9347-4.
- Peters, Thomas C. (1997). Simply C. S. Lewis: A Beginner's Guide to the Life and Works of C. S. Lewis. ISBN 0-89107-948-3.
- Petersen, William J.; Petersen, Randy (2000). 100 Christian Books That Changed the Century. Fleming H. Revell. ISBN 0-8007-5735-1.
- Phillips, Justin (2002). C. S. Lewis in a Time of War: The World War II Broadcasts That Riveted a Nation and Became the Classic Mere Christianity. HarperCollins. ISBN 0-06-088139-9.
- Sayer, George (1994) [1988]. Jack: A Life of C. S. Lewis (2nd ed.). Harper & Row. ISBN 1-58134-739-1.
- Simpson, Paul (2013). A Brief Guide to C. S. Lewis. Running Press. ISBN 978-1-47210-066-5.
- Wilson, A. N. (1990). C. S. Lewis: A Biography. Ballantine Books. ISBN 0-449-90609-4.

Chapters

- Edwards, Bruce L. (2007). "An Examined Life: Introducing C. S. Lewis". In Edwards, Bruce L. (ed.). C. S. Lewis: Life, Works, and Legacy. Vol. 1: An Examined Life. Praeger Perspectives. pp. 1–16. ISBN 978-0-275-99116-6.
- Evans, C. Stephen (2010) [1997]. "Moral Arguments". In Taliaferro, Charles; Draper, Paul; Quinn, Philip L. (eds.). A Companion to Philosophy of Religion (2nd ed.). Wiley-Blackwell. pp. 385–391. ISBN 978-06-31191-53-7.
- Heck, Joel D. (2007). "Mere Christianity: Uncommon Truth in Common Language". In Edwards, Bruce L. (ed.). C. S. Lewis: Life, Works, and Legacy. Vol. 3: Apologist, Philosopher, and Theologian. Praeger Perspectives. pp. 51–74. ISBN 978-0-275-99116-6.
- Hinten, Marvin D. (2007). "The World of Narnia: Medieval: Magic and Morality". In Edwards, Bruce L. (ed.). C. S. Lewis: Life, Works, and Legacy. Vol. 2: Fantasist, Mythmaker, and Poet. Praeger Perspectives. pp. 71–92. ISBN 978-0-275-99116-6.
- Martindale, Wayne (2007). "The Great Divorce: Journey to Heaven and Hell". In Edwards, Bruce L. (ed.). C. S. Lewis: Life, Works, and Legacy. Vol. 3: Apologist, Philosopher, and Theologian. Praeger Perspectives. pp. 133–152. ISBN 978-0-275-99116-6.
- McGrath, Alister (2015). "C. S. Lewis, Defender of the Faith". In White, Roger; Wolfe, Judith; Wolfe, Brendan N. (eds.). C. S. Lewis and His Circle: Essays and Memoirs from the Oxford C. S. Lewis Society. Oxford University Press. pp. 5–14. ISBN 978-0-19-021434-0.
- Mead, Marjorie Lamp (2007). "Letters to Malcolm: C. S. Lewis on Prayer". In Edwards, Bruce L. (ed.). C. S. Lewis: Life, Works, and Legacy. Vol. 3: Apologist, Philosopher, and Theologian. Praeger Perspectives. pp. 209–236. ISBN 978-0-275-99116-6.
