= The Pilgrim's Regress =

1933 book of allegorical fiction by C. S. Lewis

- First edition (UK)
- Author: C. S. Lewis
- Cover artist: Thomas Derrick
- Language: English
- Genre: Fantasy novel
- Publisher: J.M. Dent and Sons (UK); Sheed and Ward (US) Wm. B. Eerdmans Publishing Co. (US)
- Publication date: 1933 (UK); 1935 (US)
- Publication place: United Kingdom
- Media type: Print (Hardback & Paperback)

The Pilgrim's Regress is a book of allegorical fiction by C. S. Lewis. This 1933 novel was Lewis's first published work of prose fiction, and his third piece of work to be published and first after he converted to Christianity. It charts the progress of a fictional character named John through a philosophical landscape in search of the Island of his desire. Lewis described the novel to his publisher as "a kind of Bunyan up to date," in reference to John Bunyan's 1678 novel The Pilgrim's Progress, recast with the politics, ideologies, philosophy, and aesthetic principles of the early 20th century. As such, the character struggles with the modern phoniness, hypocrisy, and intellectual vacancy of the Christian church, Communism, Fascism, and various philosophical and artistic movements.

== Background and context ==
In September 1931, Lewis, J. R. R. Tolkien and Hugo Dyson had the famous Night of Addison’s Walk where they walked around Magdalen College discussing myth and how Christianity is the true myth.

This night served a key moment for Lewis and led to his conversion from Theism to Christianity. A year later, Lewis wrote The Pilgrim’s Regress in August 1932 while visiting the home of his longtime friend Arthur Greeves in Northern Ireland.

During the same period he wrote The Allegory of Love, which remained unpublished for several more years. The Pilgrim’s Regress was published in May 1933.

== Overview of text ==
The story centres around the main character, John, who as a boy grows up in Puritania under the stern, elusive and seemingly tyrannical Landlord, whose representatives promulgate a list of Rules. John tries to live by the Rules but soon finds himself unable to.

He discovers and has visions of an island that create an indescribable yearning within him, a "sweet desire". At first, he thinks this yearning is Lust, personified as brown girls, but when he unmasks the mistake, he decides to flee his homeland and perceived oppressor, the Landlord, in search of the far-off island. Along the way he meets Mr. Enlightenment, a personification of nineteenth-century rationalism. He invites John to join him on his travels to Claptrap but John decides to continue his search for the Island.

In the cities of Thrill and Eschropolis (meaning an ugly city in Greek), he meets personifications of romantic love, the modern literary movement and Freudianism. He thinks he has found the island through aesthetic experience, but, damaged by these characters and seeing his error, he abandons the cities. Eventually, the Spirit of the Age captures John. The spirit is drawn as a giant whose gaze makes everything transparent. So when he looks at John, everyone including John can see inside him: his bowels, stomach, lungs and so on. The giant tries to convince him that there is nothing more to him than that, but Reason, personified as a gallant woman knight, comes to the rescue to slay the Spirit of the Age. She then leads him all the way to the Grand Canyon.

As he tries to figure out how to cross, Christianity, personified as Mother Kirk, comes by and explains to him and his travelling-companion Vertue the reason for the canyon (which is the Sin of Adam) and that she is the only one who can get him across. John thinks she is mad and decides to look for an alternative crossing.

As they go North, they meet Mr Sensible, who is served by a Man named Drudge, which has served that house since the old times when Epicure moved there. Drudge is treated very poorly. They depart to the north, as Mr. Sensible decided to leave that poor land, and Drudge joins Vertue and John.

They walk a lot, till they almost can't, and found three pale brothers personified as Mr. Classic , Mr. Neo-Angular and Mr. Humanist. These men do not help John as they talk of seeing through things they have never seen at all, mainly Humanist. Neo-Angular has a personality alike Vertue, and they got some type of virtue's rivalry. Vertue goes farther north with Drudge so be could return and tell John what is there, as he was too tired to continue without aimless. They discover a valley filled with caves and inhabited by trolls and ruled over by a near-giant named Savage. They serve as models for Marxism and Fascists, and Vertue leaves with an ominous warning from Savage that he will destroy the three pale men. Drudge, who has left the pale men to accompany Vertue, stays with Savage.

Turning back and going South along the road, John and Vertue meets Mr. Broad, who represents a “modernizing religion which is friends with the World and goes on no pilgrimages.” At last, John reaches the house of Wisdom, who teaches him what is lacking from notable philosophies of the 20th century, which to Lewis were the Idealist Philosophy, Materialism and Hegelianism.

Continuing along the canyon, he encounters a Man from whom he learns that he must accept Grace or die. He had wondered if he could live by Philosophy or Pantheistic beliefs, but after accepting Grace he feels obliged - against his own inclination - to acknowledge the existence of the Landlord. He fears that, by submitting to the Landlord, he must abandon his search for the Island, and instead follow the Landlord's wishes.

After moving on from the Man he discovers a hermit named History. History tells John that not everyone has as clear visions of the Islands, but they receive pictures that prove similar. Others - the Shepherd People, representing Jews - have no pictures but instead have Rules. The hermit tells him that "sweet desire" and the Rules are opposite ends of the same thing.

John wants to leave but Reason will not let him and leads him to Mother Kirk. Mother Kirk instructs him to dive into a pool of water. John replies that he does not know how, but then learns that diving is only the art of ceasing to do anything. After diving, he comes to a land where the Island is very close, but across a body of water, and there are no ships. He is told that it is only the other side of the same Mountains which he has known his whole life in Puritania.

The Regress portion of the title now comes into play as John journeys back home and now sees everything in a new light, and sees how the road he took is on a knife-edge between Heaven and Hell.

== Reception and criticisms ==
In the years after its first publication, the book found mixed reviews. George Sayer found it remarkable how acutely Lewis could diagnose and explain the weaknesses of contemporary doctrine.

Others, however, found difficulties, and Lewis wrote a preface in the third edition to help explain more of what he meant. He criticized himself for “needless obscurity and an uncharitable temper.” He also admits that he had a specific idea of Romanticism that was much different from the rest of the world's. He also mistook his protagonist, John, as a relatable everyman. He said he was wrong in thinking that most people came to Christ the way he had done.

Philip and Carol Zaleski criticize Lewis for populating his book with straw men. They said that his characters were not personifications but pet peeves. This was Lewis at his least charitable and he made too strong a case for his conversion. They say the experience taught Lewis to wear his allegory a little more lightly.
