= Bruce Edwards =

Bruce Edwards may refer to:

- Bruce Edwards (actor) (1911–2002), American actor and photographer
- Bruce Edwards (baseball) (1923–1975), MLB catcher
- Bruce L. Edwards (1952–2015), C. S. Lewis scholar
- Bruce Edwards (caddie) (1954–2004)

== See also ==
- Bruce Edwards Ivins (1946–2008), anthrax terrorist
