= Spirits in Bondage =

Collection of poems by C. S. Lewis

First edition (publ. Heinemann)

Spirits in Bondage: A Cycle of Lyrics (1919) was C. S. Lewis's first published work (originally published under the pseudonym Clive Hamilton, which is Lewis' first name followed by his mother's maiden name). Lewis was 20 years old and had just returned from military service in the First World War. His tutor, William T. Kirkpatrick, encouraged him in publishing the book, although it was unusual at Lewis's age, as writers were expected to wait longer before sharing their work with the world.

The book is composed of three different sections of poetry. The poems take on several styles and rhythms throughout the book, but share common themes. This work stands out among Lewis's writings not only because of the focus on poetry rather than prose, but because the author had not yet made his conversion to Christianity; therefore the themes and worldviews offered in Spirits in Bondage differ greatly from those for which Lewis is most well known. The book received no reviews and its reception was a slight disappointment for Lewis. The title is derived from Milton's Paradise Lost (1.658).

== Contents ==
Spirits in Bondage is composed of three sections of poetry: The Prison House, Hesitation, and The Escape. The complete contents of the book are as follows:

- Part I: The Prison House

I. Satan Speaks
II. French Nocturne
III. The Satyr
IV. Victory
V. Irish Nocturne
VI. Spooks
VII. Apology
VIII. Ode For New Year's Day
IX. Night
X. To Sleep
XI. In Prison
XII. De Profundis
XIII. Satan Speaks
XIV. The Witch
XV. Dungeon Grates
XVI. The Philosopher
XVII. The Ocean Strand
XVIII. Noon
XIX. Milton Read Again
XX. Sonnet
XXI. The Autumn Morning

- Part II: Hesitation

XXII. L'Apprenti Sorcier
XXIII. Alexandrines
XXIV. In Praise Of Solid People

- Part III: The Escape

XXV. Song Of The Pilgrims
XXVI. Song
XXVII. The Ass
XXVIII. Ballade Mystique
XXIX. Night
XXX. Oxford
XXXI. Hymn (For Boys' Voices)
XXXII. "Our Daily Bread"
XXXIII. How He Saw Angus The God
XXXIV. The Roads
XXXV. Hesperus
XXXVI. The Star Bath
XXXVII. Tu Ne Quæsieris
XXXVIII. Lullaby
XXXIX. World's Desire
XL. Death In Battle

== Themes ==
Spirits in Bondage differs from more widely read Lewis works in that he does not yet write from a Christian worldview. The poems are meant to be read in order (thus, A Cycle of Lyrics) so that the themes can develop and present themselves to the reader properly. Although not an atheist, Lewis takes the stance of an agnostic with a pessimistic outlook on religion and God. A central theme to his poetry, which led him to choose the title Spirits in Bondage, is his early belief that God had instilled deep desires in Man that could not be attained, and that Man would think he were reaching his goal only to be ultimately bitterly disappointed.

Lewis also takes an attitude toward nature not typical of his later works. In Spirits in Bondage nature is cruel and hard, deceptive and not to be trusted, although Lewis does admire her in several of the poems.

Also notable are Lewis's references to both mythology and the war atmosphere in which he had lived. Kirkpatrick noted that Lewis, his most brilliant student, had read more classics than any other boy he knew. In a few scattered poems Lewis draws a picture of the war front for the audience; indeed, "Death in Battle" was published in the Reveille periodical.

== Sources ==
- Lewis, C.S. Spirits in Bondage: A Cycle of Lyrics. London: Harcourt Brace & Company, 1984.
