= Between Heaven and Hell =

Between Heaven and Hell may refer to:

- Between Heaven and Hell (film), a 1956 film directed by Richard Fleischer
- Between Heaven and Hell (novel), a 1982 novel by Peter Kreeft
- "Between Heaven and Hell" (song), a 1996 song by Zakk Wylde
- Between Heaven and Hell (album), an album by Firewind
- Between Heaven 'n Hell, a 1985 album by Resurrection Band
- Between Heaven and Hell, an album by Black Sabbath
- Between Heaven and Hell, the original title of the soap opera, One Life to Live
- Between Heaven and Hell: The Story of a Thousand Years of Artistic Life in Russia, a book by W. Bruce Lincoln
- "Between Heaven and Hell", theme song written by Rob Saffi, for the television show Paranormal Lockdown
- Between Heaven and Hell: The Story of My Stroke, 2010 non-fiction book by David Talbot
