= Between Heaven and Hell (novel) =

1982 book by Peter Kreeft

- Author: Peter Kreeft
- Language: English
- Genre: Christian novel
- Publisher: InterVarsity Press (US)
- Publication date: 1982
- Publication place: United States
- Media type: Print (Hardback & Paperback)
- Pages: 115 pp
- ISBN: 0-87784-389-9
- OCLC: 8476739
- Dewey Decimal: 201 19
- LC Class: PS3561.R3817 B4 1982

Between Heaven and Hell: A Dialog Somewhere Beyond Death with John F. Kennedy, C. S. Lewis, & Aldous Huxley is a novel by Peter Kreeft about U.S. President John F. Kennedy, and authors C. S. Lewis (The Chronicles of Narnia) and Aldous Huxley (Brave New World) meeting in Purgatory and engaging in a philosophical discussion on faith. It was inspired by the fact that all three men died on the same day: November 22, 1963. The narrative is told from three points of view: Kennedy's "modern Christian" view, Lewis's "conservative Christian" or "mere Christian" view, and Huxley's "Orientalized Christian" view. The book progresses as Lewis and Kennedy discuss Jesus's being God incarnate, to Lewis and Huxley discussing whether or not Jesus was a deity or "just a good person."

An expanded edition was published by InterVarsity Press on May 16, 2008.

== Reception ==
In Mythlore, Nancy Patterson praised Between Heaven and Hell as "an entertaining hour's read", but noted that the discussion between the characters "does not range very widely", and questioned whether it was fair and accurate to depict actual historical figures so narrowly as to have each represent a single philosophical stance. In Christianity and Literature, Max H. James considered the book's central premise to be "a clever idea", but stated that despite Kreeft's "admiration of Plato and C.S. Lewis, [he] cannot in the least write like either of them;" James also observed that Kreeft introduces topics "sometimes cleverly but often tediously", and faulted him for his use of clichés, for his "lack of distinction between religious statements (...) and empirical statements", and for his depiction of Kennedy as ignorant and "babbl[ing] like a moron". In The Daily Beast, John Garth was similarly critical of Kreeft's portrayal of Kennedy, to the extent that he felt Kreeft "had no more interest in capturing character than in providing a plot".
