= C. S. Lewis =

British writer, lay theologian, and scholar (1898–1963)

C. S. Lewis FBA
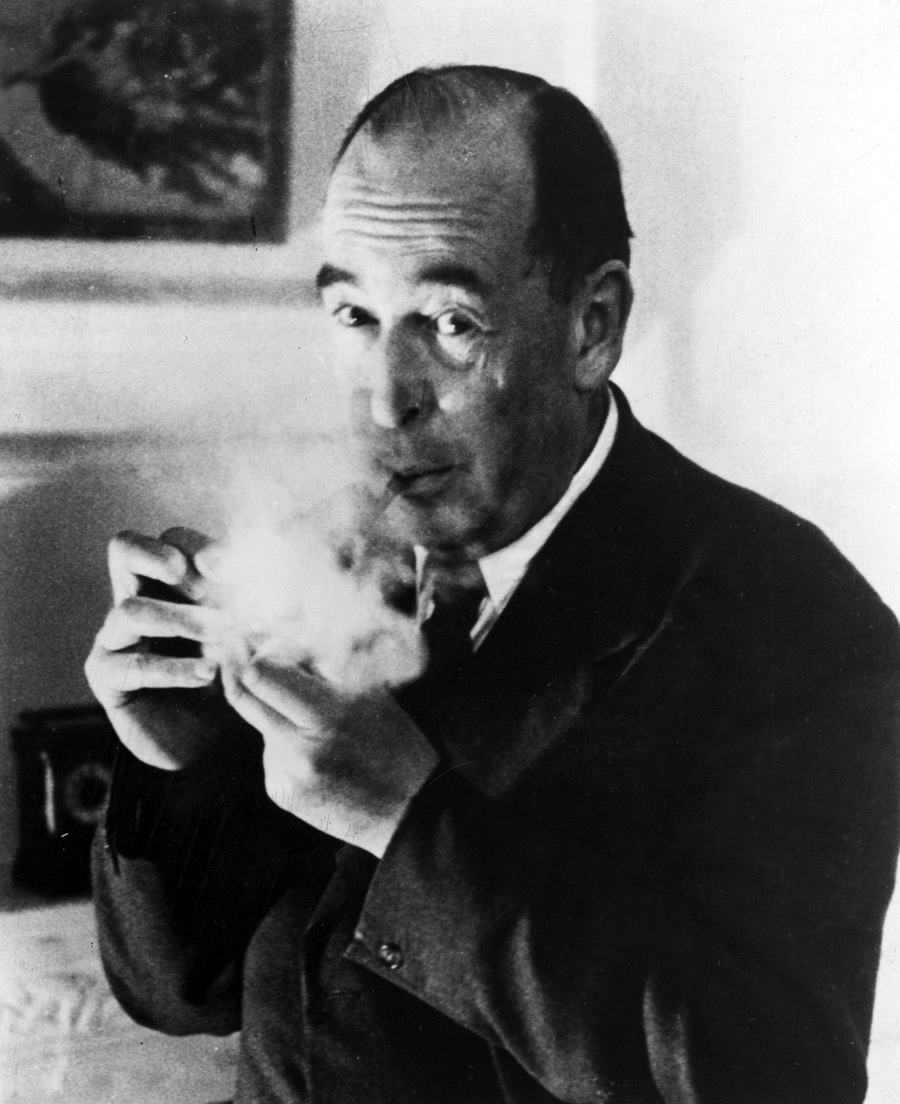
- Lewis, c. 1957
- Born: Clive Staples Lewis; 29 November 1898; Belfast, Ireland
- Died: 22 November 1963 (aged 64); Oxford, England
- Resting place: Holy Trinity Church, Headington Quarry
- Education: University of Oxford
- Occupations: Novelist; scholar; broadcaster
- Spouse: Joy Davidman (m. 1956; died 1960)
- Children: 2 step-sons, including Douglas Gresham
- Relatives: Warren Lewis (brother)
- Military service
- Allegiance: United Kingdom
- Branch: British Army
- Service years: 1917–18; 1940–44
- Rank: Second Lieutenant
- Units: Oxford University Training Corps; Somerset Light Infantry; Oxford Home Guard
- Conflicts: First World War; First Battle of Cambrai; Operation Michael; Battle of Lys (WIA); Second World War
- Writing career
- Pen name: Clive Hamilton, N. W. Clerk
- Genres: Christian apologetics, fantasy, science fiction, children's literature
- Notable works: The Chronicles of Narnia; Mere Christianity; The Allegory of Love; The Screwtape Letters; The Abolition of Man; The Space Trilogy (Out of the Silent Planet, Perelandra, That Hideous Strength); Till We Have Faces; Surprised by Joy

Clive Staples Lewis (29 November 1898 – 22 November 1963) was a British author, literary scholar and Anglican lay theologian. He held academic positions in English literature at both Magdalen College, Oxford (1925–1954), and Magdalene College, Cambridge (1954–1963). He is best known as the author of The Chronicles of Narnia, but he is also noted for his other works of fiction, such as The Screwtape Letters and The Space Trilogy, and for his non-fiction Christian apologetics, including Mere Christianity, Miracles and The Problem of Pain.

Lewis was a close friend of J. R. R. Tolkien, the author of The Lord of the Rings. Both men served on the English faculty at the University of Oxford and were active in the informal Oxford literary group known as the Inklings. According to Lewis's 1955 memoir Surprised by Joy, he was baptized in the Church of Ireland but lost his faith and became an atheist during adolescence. Lewis returned to Anglicanism at the age of 32, owing to the influence of Tolkien and other friends, and he became an "ordinary layman of the Church of England". Lewis's faith profoundly affected his work, and his wartime radio broadcasts on the subject of Christianity brought him wide acclaim.

Lewis wrote more than 30 books which have been translated into over 30 languages and have sold millions of copies. The seven books that make up The Chronicles of Narnia have sold the most and have been popularized on stage, television, radio and cinema. His philosophical writings are widely cited by Christian scholars from many denominations.

In 1956 Lewis married the American writer Joy Davidman; she died of cancer four years later at the age of 45. Lewis died on 22 November 1963 of kidney failure, at age 64. In 2013, on the 50th anniversary of his death, Lewis was honoured with a memorial in Poets' Corner in Westminster Abbey.

== Life ==
=== Childhood ===
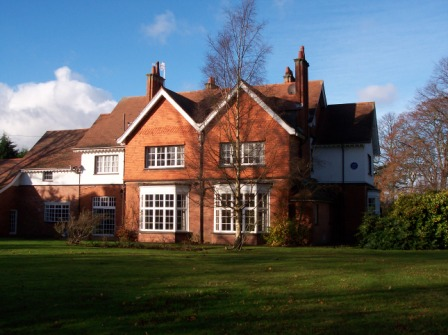
Little Lea, home of the Lewis family from 1905 to 1930

Clive Staples Lewis was born in Belfast in Ulster, Ireland (before partition), on 29 November 1898. His father was Albert James Lewis (1863–1929), a solicitor whose father Richard Lewis had come to Ireland from Wales during the mid-19th century. Lewis's mother was Florence Augusta Lewis née Hamilton (1862–1908), known as Flora, the daughter of Thomas Hamilton, a Church of Ireland priest, and the great-granddaughter of both Bishop Hugh Hamilton and John Staples. She was the first female mathematics graduate to study at Queen's College Belfast. Lewis had an elder brother, Warren Hamilton Lewis (known as "Warnie"). He was baptized on 29 January 1899 by his maternal grandfather in St Mark's Church, Dundela.

When his dog Jacksie was fatally struck by a horse-drawn carriage, the four-year-old Lewis adopted the name Jacksie. At first, he would answer to no other name, but later accepted Jack, the name by which he was known to friends and family for the rest of his life. When he was seven, his family moved into "Little Lea", the family home of his childhood, in the Strandtown area of East Belfast.

As a boy, Lewis was fascinated with anthropomorphic animals; he fell in love with Beatrix Potter's stories and often wrote and illustrated his own animal tales. Along with his brother Warnie, he created the world of Boxen, a fantasy world inhabited and run by animals. Lewis loved to read from an early age. His father's house was filled with books; he later wrote that finding something to read was as easy as walking into a field and "finding a new blade of grass".

The New House is almost a major character in my story.
I am the product of long corridors, empty sunlit rooms,
upstair indoor silences, attics explored in solitude,
distant noises of gurgling cisterns and pipes,
and the noise of wind under the tiles. Also, of endless books.

— Surprised by Joy

Lewis was schooled by private tutors until age nine, when his mother died in 1908 from cancer. His father then sent him to England to live and study at Wynyard School in Watford, Hertfordshire. Lewis's brother had enrolled there three years previously. Not long after, the school was closed due to a lack of pupils. Lewis then attended Campbell College in the east of Belfast about a mile from his home, but left after a few months due to respiratory problems.

He was then sent back to England to the health-resort town of Malvern, Worcestershire, where he attended the preparatory school Cherbourg House, which Lewis referred to as "Chartres" in his autobiography. It was during this time that he abandoned the Christianity he was taught as a child and became an atheist. During this time he also developed a fascination with European mythology and the occult.

In September 1913 Lewis enrolled at Malvern College, where he remained until the following June. He found the school socially competitive, and some of the fellow pupils of his house, such as Donald Hardman, had mixed feelings about him. Hardman later recalled:

He was a bit of a rebel; he had a wonderful sense of humour and was a past master of mimicry. I think he took his work seriously, but nothing else; never took any interest in games and never played any so for as I can remember unless he had to. ... I met him in Oxford after the war and noticed he had changed, but was staggered to find him the author of The Screwtape Letters. When I knew him I can only describe him as a riotously amusing atheist. He really was pretty foul mouthed about it.

After leaving Malvern he studied privately with William T. Kirkpatrick, his father's old tutor and former headmaster of Lurgan College.

As a teenager Lewis was wonderstruck by the songs and legends of what he called Northernness, the ancient literature of Scandinavia preserved in the Icelandic sagas. These legends intensified an inner longing that he would later call "joy". He also grew to love nature; its beauty reminded him of the stories of the North, and the stories of the North reminded him of the beauties of nature. His teenage writings moved away from the tales of Boxen, and he began experimenting with different art forms such as epic poetry and opera to try to capture his new-found interest in Norse mythology and the natural world.

Studying with Kirkpatrick ("The Great Knock", as Lewis afterward called him) instilled in him a love of Greek literature and mythology and sharpened his debate and reasoning skills. In 1916, Lewis was awarded a scholarship at University College, Oxford.

=== "My Irish life" ===
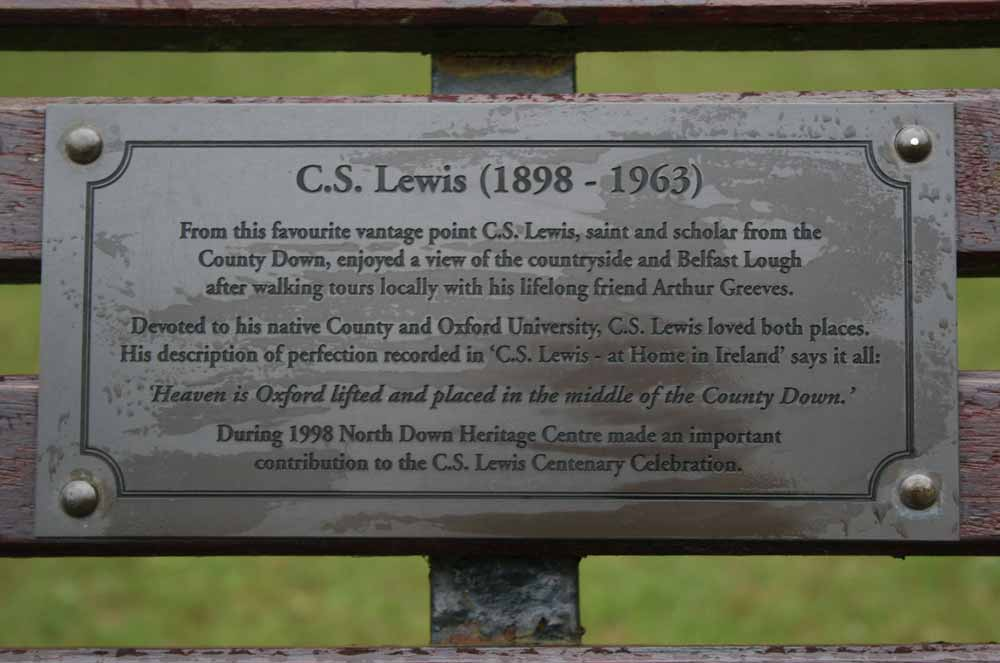
Plaque on a park-bench in Bangor, County Down

Lewis experienced a certain cultural shock on first arriving in England: "No Englishman will be able to understand my first impressions of England," Lewis wrote in Surprised by Joy. "The strange English accents with which I was surrounded seemed like the voices of demons. But what was worst was the English landscape ... I have made up the quarrel since; but at that moment I conceived a hatred for England which took many years to heal."

From boyhood, Lewis had immersed himself in Norse and Greek mythology, and later in Irish mythology and literature. He also expressed an interest in the Irish language, though there is not much evidence that he laboured to learn it. He developed a particular fondness for W. B. Yeats, in part because of Yeats's use of Ireland's Celtic heritage in poetry. In a letter to a friend, Lewis wrote, "I have here discovered an author exactly after my own heart, whom I am sure you would delight in, W. B. Yeats. He writes plays and poems of rare spirit and beauty about our old Irish mythology."

In 1921 Lewis met Yeats twice, since Yeats had moved to Oxford. Lewis was surprised to find his English peers indifferent to Yeats and the Celtic Revival movement and wrote: "I am often surprised to find how utterly ignored Yeats is among the men I have met: perhaps his appeal is purely Irish – if so, then thank the gods that I am Irish." Early in his career, Lewis considered sending his work to the major Dublin publishers, writing: "If I do ever send my stuff to a publisher, I think I shall try Maunsel, those Dublin people, and so tack myself definitely onto the Irish school."

After his conversion to Christianity his interests gravitated towards Christian theology and away from pagan Celtic mysticism (as opposed to Celtic Christian mysticism).

Lewis occasionally expressed a somewhat tongue-in-cheek chauvinism towards the English. Describing an encounter with a fellow Irishman, he wrote: "Like all Irish people who meet in England, we ended by criticisms on the invincible flippancy and dullness of the Anglo-Saxon race. After all, there is no doubt, ami, that the Irish are the only people: with all their faults, I would not gladly live or die among another folk." Throughout his life he sought out the company of other Irish people living in England and visited Northern Ireland regularly. In 1958 he spent his honeymoon there at the Old Inn, Crawfordsburn, which he called "my Irish life".

Various critics have suggested that it was Lewis's dismay over the sectarian conflict in his native Belfast which led him to eventually adopt such an ecumenical brand of Christianity. As one critic has said, Lewis "repeatedly extolled the virtues of all branches of the Christian faith, emphasising a need for unity among Christians around what the Catholic writer G. K. Chesterton called 'Mere Christianity', the core doctrinal beliefs that all denominations share".

Paul Stevens of the University of Toronto opined that "Lewis' mere Christianity masked many of the political prejudices of an old-fashioned Ulster Protestant, a native of middle-class Belfast for whom British withdrawal from Northern Ireland even in the 1950s and 1960s was unthinkable."

=== First World War and Oxford University ===
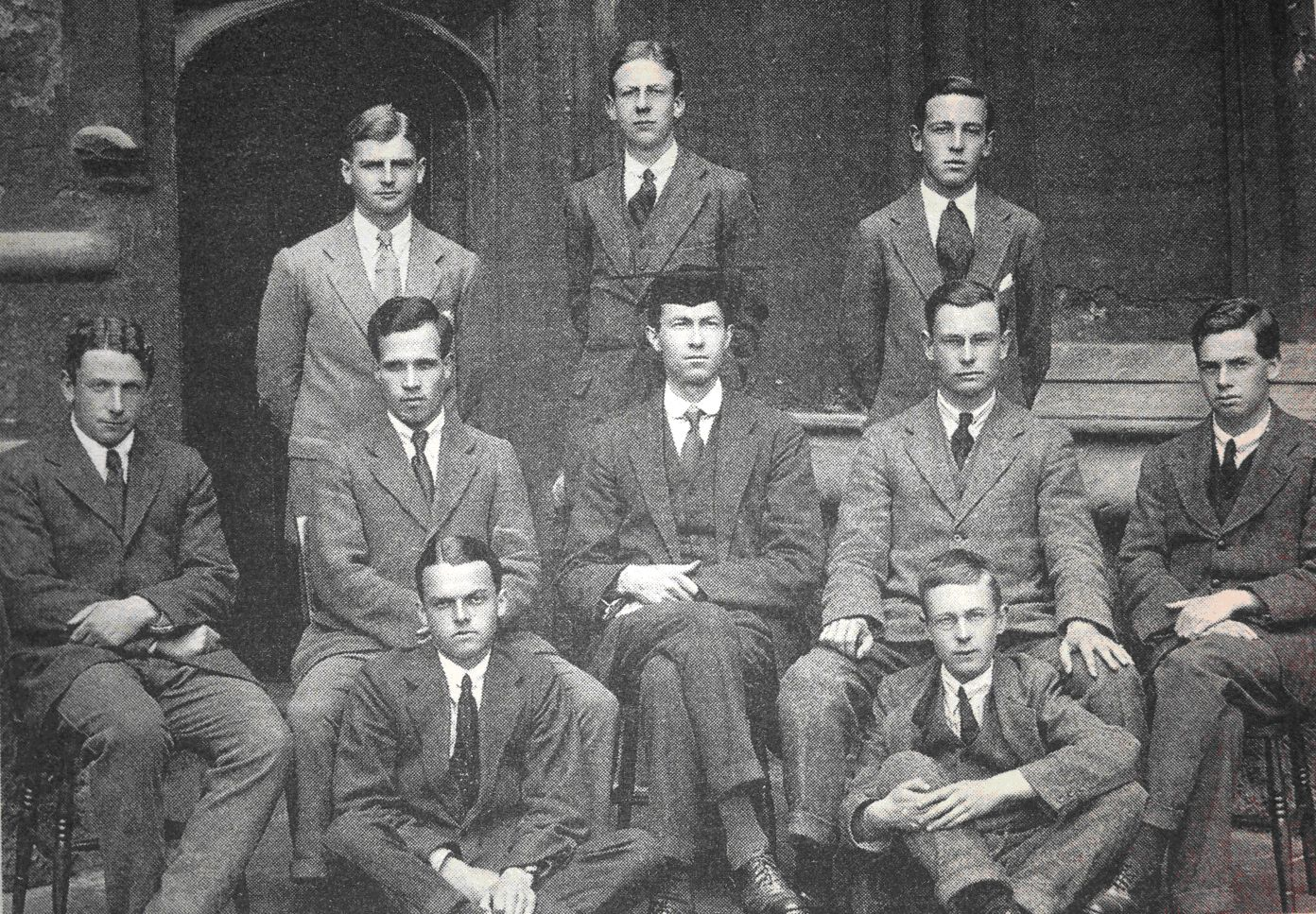
The undergraduates of University College, Trinity term 1917. Lewis stands on the right-hand side of the back row.

Lewis entered Oxford in the 1917 summer term, studying at University College, and shortly after, he joined the Officers' Training Corps at the university as his "most promising route into the army". From there he was drafted into a Cadet Battalion for training. After his training he was commissioned into the 3rd Battalion of the Somerset Light Infantry of the British Army as a Second Lieutenant, and was later transferred to the 1st Battalion of the regiment, then serving in France (he would not remain with the 3rd Battalion as it moved to Northern Ireland). Within months of entering Oxford, he was shipped by the British Army to France to fight in the First World War.

On his 19th birthday (29 November 1917) Lewis arrived at the front line in the Somme Valley in France, where he experienced trench warfare for the first time. On 15 April 1918, as 1st Battalion, Somerset Light Infantry assaulted the village of Riez du Vinage in the midst of the German spring offensive, Lewis was wounded and two of his colleagues were killed by a British shell falling short of its target. He was depressed and homesick during his convalescence and, upon his recovery in October, he was assigned to duty in Andover, England. He was demobilized in December 1918 and soon restarted his studies. In a later letter, Lewis stated that his experience of the horrors of war, along with the loss of his mother and unhappiness in school, were the basis of his pessimism and atheism.

After Lewis returned to Oxford, he received a First in Honour Moderations (Greek and Latin literature) in 1920, a First in Greats (Philosophy and Ancient History) in 1922 and a First in English in 1923. In 1924 he became a philosophy tutor at University College and, in 1925, was elected a Fellow and Tutor in English Literature at Magdalen College, where he served for 29 years until 1954.

=== Janie Moore ===
During his army training, Lewis shared a room with another cadet, Edward Courtnay Francis "Paddy" Moore (1898–1918). Maureen Moore, Paddy's sister, said that the two made a mutual pact that if either died during the war, the survivor would take care of both of their families. Paddy was killed in action in 1918 and Lewis kept his promise. Paddy had earlier introduced Lewis to his mother, Janie King Moore, and a friendship quickly sprang up between Lewis, who was 18 when they met, and Janie, who was 45. The friendship with Moore was particularly important to Lewis while he was recovering from his wounds in hospital, as his father did not visit him.

Lewis lived with and cared for Moore until she was hospitalized in the late 1940s. He routinely introduced her as his mother, referred to her as such in letters, and developed a deeply affectionate friendship with her. Lewis's own mother had died when he was a child, while his father was distant, demanding, and eccentric.

Speculation regarding their relationship resurfaced with the 1990 publication of A. N. Wilson's biography of Lewis. Wilson (who never met Lewis) attempted to make a case for their having been lovers for a time. Wilson's biography was not the first to address the question of Lewis's relationship with Moore. George Sayer knew Lewis for 29 years, and he had sought to shed light on the relationship during the period of 14 years before Lewis's conversion to Christianity. In his biography Jack: A Life of C. S. Lewis, he wrote:

Were they lovers? Owen Barfield, who knew Jack well in the 1920s, once said that he thought the likelihood was "fifty-fifty". Although she was twenty-six years older than Jack, she was still a handsome woman, and he was certainly infatuated with her. But it seems very odd, if they were lovers, that he would call her "mother". We know, too, that they did not share the same bedroom. It seems most likely that he was bound to her by the promise he had given to Paddy and that his promise was reinforced by his love for her as his second mother.

Later Sayer changed his mind. In the introduction to the 1997 edition of his biography of Lewis he wrote:

I have had to alter my opinion of Lewis's relationship with Mrs. Moore. In chapter eight of this book I wrote that I was uncertain about whether they were lovers. Now after conversations with Mrs. Moore's daughter, Maureen, and a consideration of the way in which their bedrooms were arranged at The Kilns, I am quite certain that they were.

However, the romantic nature of the relationship is doubted by other writers; for example, Philip Zaleski and Carol Zaleski write in The Fellowship that

When—or whether—Lewis commenced an affair with Mrs. Moore remains unclear.

Lewis spoke well of Mrs. Moore throughout his life, saying to his friend George Sayer, "She was generous and taught me to be generous, too." In December 1917, Lewis wrote in a letter to his childhood friend Arthur Greeves that Janie and Greeves were "the two people who matter most to me in the world".

In 1930 Lewis moved into The Kilns with his brother Warnie, Mrs. Moore, and her daughter Maureen. The Kilns was a house in the district of Headington Quarry on the outskirts of Oxford, now part of the suburb of Risinghurst. They all contributed financially to the purchase of the house, which eventually passed to Maureen, who by then was Dame Maureen Dunbar, when Warren died in 1973. Moore had dementia in her later years and was eventually moved into a nursing home, where she died in 1951. Lewis visited her every day in this home until her death.

=== Return to Christianity ===
Lewis was raised in a religious family that attended the Church of Ireland. He became an atheist at age 15, though he later described his young self as being paradoxically "very angry with God for not existing" and "equally angry with him for creating a world". His early separation from Christianity began when he started to view his religion as a chore and a duty; around this time, he also gained an interest in the occult, as his studies expanded to include such topics. Lewis quoted Lucretius (De rerum natura, 5.198–9) as having one of the strongest arguments for atheism:

Nequaquam nobis divinitus esse paratam
Naturam rerum; tanta stat praedita culpa

Lewis translated this poetically as follows: (Note: Lewis' translation is a highly poetic, rather than a literal translation. A more literal translation, by William Ellery Leonard, reads: "That in no wise the nature of all things / For us was fashioned by a power divine – / So great the faults it stands encumbered with.")

Had God designed the world, it would not be
A world so frail and faulty as we see.

Lewis's interest in the works of the Scottish writer George MacDonald was part of what turned him from atheism. This can be seen particularly well through this passage in Lewis's The Great Divorce, chapter nine, when the semi-autobiographical protagonist meets MacDonald in Heaven:

I tried, trembling, to tell this man all that his writings had done for me. I tried to tell how a certain frosty afternoon at Leatherhead Station when I had first bought a copy of Phantastes (being then about sixteen years old) had been to me what the first sight of Beatrice had been to Dante: Here begins the new life. I started to confess how long that Life had delayed in the region of imagination merely: how slowly and reluctantly I had come to admit that his Christendom had more than an accidental connexion with it, how hard I had tried not to see the true name of the quality which first met me in his books is Holiness.

He eventually returned to Christianity, having been influenced by arguments with his Oxford colleague and friend J. R. R. Tolkien, whom he seems to have met for the first time on 11 May 1926, as well as the book The Everlasting Man by G. K. Chesterton. Lewis vigorously resisted conversion, noting that he was brought into Christianity like a prodigal, "kicking, struggling, resentful, and darting his eyes in every direction for a chance to escape". He described his last struggle in Surprised by Joy:

You must picture me alone in that room in Magdalen [College, Oxford], night after night, feeling, whenever my mind lifted even for a second from my work, the steady, unrelenting approach of Him whom I so earnestly desired not to meet. That which I greatly feared had at last come upon me. In the Trinity Term of 1929 (Note: Alister McGrath sees the 1929 date as an error, and dates it to 1930. McGrath, Alister (2013). C. S. Lewis—A Life: Eccentric Genius, Reluctant Prophet. Tyndale House. p. 146. ISBN 9781414382524.) I gave in, and admitted that God was God, and knelt and prayed: perhaps, that night, the most dejected and reluctant convert in all England.

After his conversion to theism in 1929, Lewis converted to Christianity in 1931, following a long discussion during a late-night walk along Addison's Walk with his close friends Tolkien and Hugo Dyson. He records making a specific commitment to Christian belief while on his way to the zoo with his brother. He became a member of the Church of England – somewhat to the disappointment of Tolkien, who had hoped that he would join the Catholic Church.

Lewis was a committed Anglican who upheld a largely orthodox Anglican theology, though in his apologetic writings, he made an effort to avoid espousing any one denomination. In his later writings, some believe that he proposed ideas such as purification of venial sins after death in purgatory (The Great Divorce and Letters to Malcolm) and mortal sin (The Screwtape Letters), which are generally considered to be Roman Catholic teachings, although they are also widely held in Anglicanism (particularly in high church Anglo-Catholic circles). Regardless, Lewis considered himself an entirely orthodox Anglican to the end of his life, reflecting that he had initially attended church only to receive communion and had been repelled by the hymns and the poor quality of the sermons. He later came to consider himself honoured by worshipping with men of faith who came in shabby clothes and work boots and who sang all the verses to all the hymns.

=== Second World War ===
After the outbreak of the Second World War in 1939, the Lewises took child evacuees from London and other cities into The Kilns. Lewis was only 40 when the war began, and he tried to re-enter military service, offering to instruct cadets; however, his offer was not accepted. He rejected the recruiting office's suggestion of writing columns for the Ministry of Information in the press, as he did not want to "write lies" to deceive the enemy. He later served in the local Home Guard in Oxford.

From 1941 to 1943 Lewis spoke on religious programmes broadcast by the BBC from London while the city was under periodic air raids. These broadcasts were appreciated by civilians and servicemen at that stage. For example, Air Chief Marshal Sir Donald Hardman wrote "The war, the whole of life, everything tended to seem pointless. We needed, many of us, a key to the meaning of the universe. Lewis provided just that." The youthful Alistair Cooke was less impressed, and in 1944 described "the alarming vogue of Mr. C.S. Lewis" as an example of how wartime tends to "spawn so many quack religions and Messiahs". The broadcasts were anthologized in Mere Christianity. From 1941 Lewis was occupied at his summer holiday weekends visiting Royal Air Force stations to speak on his faith, invited by Chaplain-in-Chief Maurice Edwards. It was also during the same wartime period that Lewis was invited to become first President of the Oxford Socratic Club in January 1942, a position he enthusiastically held until he resigned on appointment to the University of Cambridge in 1954.

=== Honour declined ===
Lewis was named on the last list of honours by George VI in December 1951 as a Commander of the Order of the British Empire (CBE) but declined so as to avoid association with any political issues.

=== Chair at Cambridge University ===
In 1954 Lewis accepted the newly founded chair in Mediaeval and Renaissance Literature at Magdalene College, Cambridge, where he finished his career. He maintained a strong attachment to the city of Oxford, keeping a home there and returning on weekends until his death in 1963.

=== Joy Davidman ===
She was my daughter and my mother, my pupil and my teacher, my subject and my sovereign; and always, holding all these in solution, my trusty comrade, friend, shipmate, fellow-soldier. My mistress; but at the same time all that any man friend (and I have good ones) has ever been to me. Perhaps more.

— C. S. Lewis

In his later life Lewis corresponded with Joy Davidman Gresham, an American writer of Jewish background, a former member of the Communist Party USA and a convert from atheism to Christianity. She was separated from her alcoholic and abusive husband, the novelist William L. Gresham, and came to England with her two sons, David and Douglas. Lewis at first regarded her as an agreeable intellectual companion and personal friend, and it was on this level that he agreed to enter into a civil marriage contract with her so that she could continue to live in Britain. They were married at the register office, 42 St Giles', Oxford, on 23 April 1956. Lewis's brother Warren wrote: "For Jack the attraction was at first undoubtedly intellectual. Joy was the only woman whom he had met ... who had a brain which matched his own in suppleness, in width of interest, and in analytical grasp, and above all in humour and a sense of fun." After complaining of a painful hip, she was diagnosed with terminal bone cancer, and the relationship developed to the point that they sought a Christian marriage. Since she was divorced, this was not straightforward in the Church of England at the time, but a friend, the Rev. Peter Bide, performed the ceremony at her bed in the Churchill Hospital on 21 March 1957.

Gresham's cancer soon went into remission, and the couple lived together as a family with Warren Lewis until 1960, when her cancer recurred. She died on 13 July 1960. Earlier that year, the couple took a brief holiday in Greece and the Aegean; Lewis was fond of walking but not of travel, and this marked his only crossing of the English Channel after 1918. Lewis's book A Grief Observed describes his experience of bereavement in such a raw and personal fashion that he originally released it under the pseudonym N. W. Clerk to keep readers from associating the book with him. Ironically, many friends recommended the book to Lewis as a method for dealing with his own grief. After Lewis's death, his authorship was made public by Faber, with the permission of the executors.

Lewis had adopted Gresham's two sons and continued to raise them after her death. Douglas Gresham is a Christian like Lewis and his mother, while David Gresham turned to his mother's ancestral faith, becoming Orthodox Jewish in his beliefs. His mother's writings had featured the Jews in an unsympathetic manner, particularly on shechita (ritual slaughter). David informed Lewis that he was going to become a shohet, a ritual slaughterer, to present this type of Jewish religious functionary to the world in a more favourable light. In a 2005 interview Douglas Gresham acknowledged that he and his brother were not close, although they had corresponded via email.

David died on 25 December 2014. In 2020 Douglas revealed that his brother had died at a Swiss mental hospital, and that when David was a young man he had been diagnosed with paranoid schizophrenia.

=== Illness and death ===
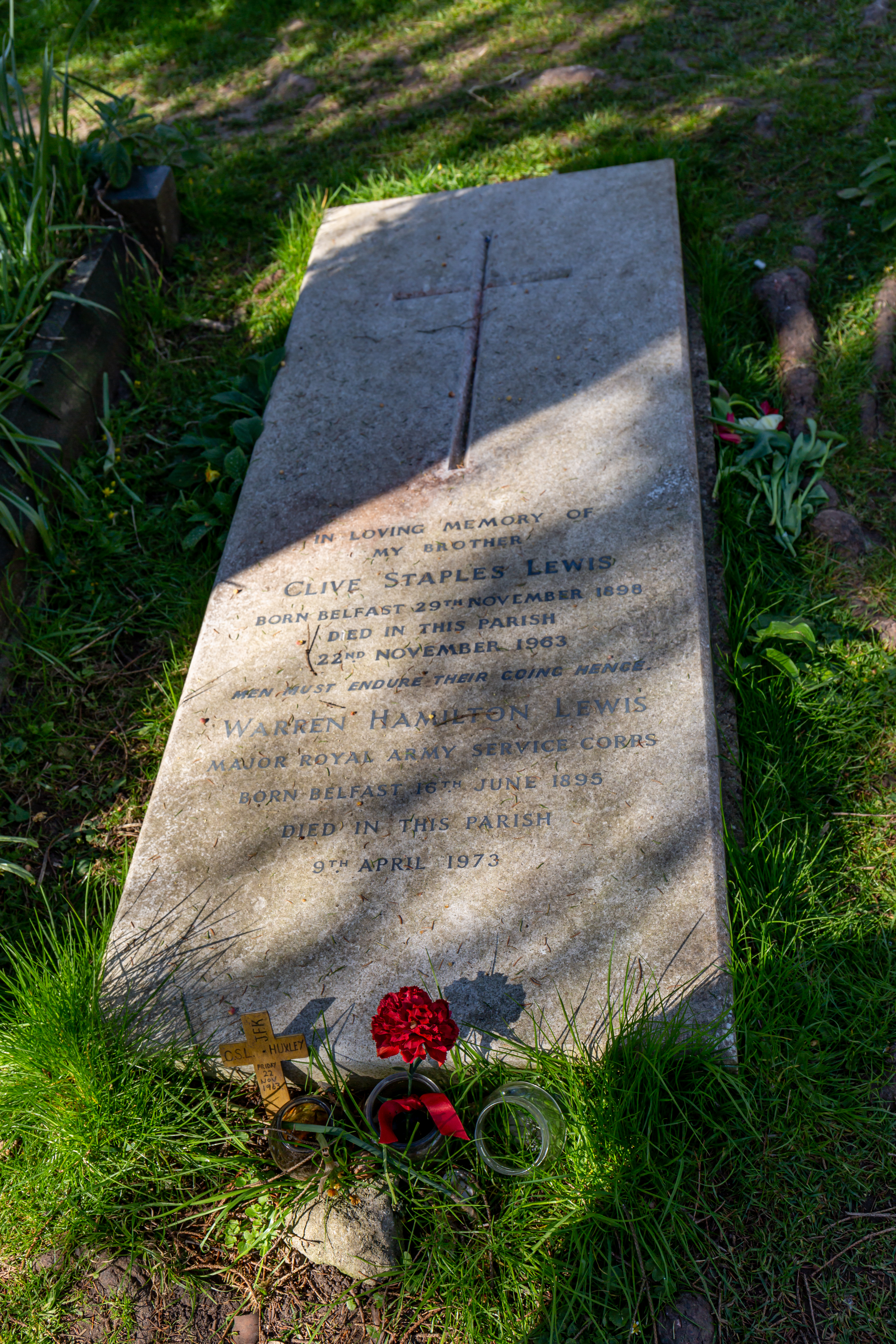
Lewis's grave at Holy Trinity Church, Headington Quarry

In early June 1961 Lewis became afflicted with recurrent nephritis which progressed to chronic low-grade sepsis. His illness caused him to miss the autumn term at Cambridge, though his health gradually began improving in 1962 and he returned that April. His health continued to improve and, according to his friend George Sayer, Lewis was fully himself by early 1963.

On 15 July that year Lewis fell ill and was admitted to the hospital; he had a heart attack at 5:00 pm the next day and lapsed into a coma, but unexpectedly woke the following day at 2:00 pm. After he was discharged from the hospital, Lewis returned to the Kilns, though he was too ill to return to work. As a result, he resigned from his post at Cambridge in August 1963.

Lewis's condition continued to decline, and he was diagnosed with end-stage kidney failure in mid-November. He collapsed in his bedroom at 5:30 pm on 22 November 1963, at age 64, and died a few minutes later. He is buried in the churchyard of Holy Trinity Church, Headington, Oxford. His brother Warren died on 9 April 1973 and was buried in the same grave.

Media coverage of Lewis's death was largely overshadowed by news of the assassination of John F. Kennedy, which occurred on the same day (approximately 55 minutes following Lewis's collapse), as did the death of the English writer Aldous Huxley, the author of Brave New World. This coincidence was the inspiration for Peter Kreeft's book Between Heaven and Hell: A Dialog Somewhere Beyond Death with John F. Kennedy, C. S. Lewis, & Aldous Huxley. Lewis is commemorated on 22 November in the church calendar of the Episcopal Church.

== Career ==
=== Scholar ===
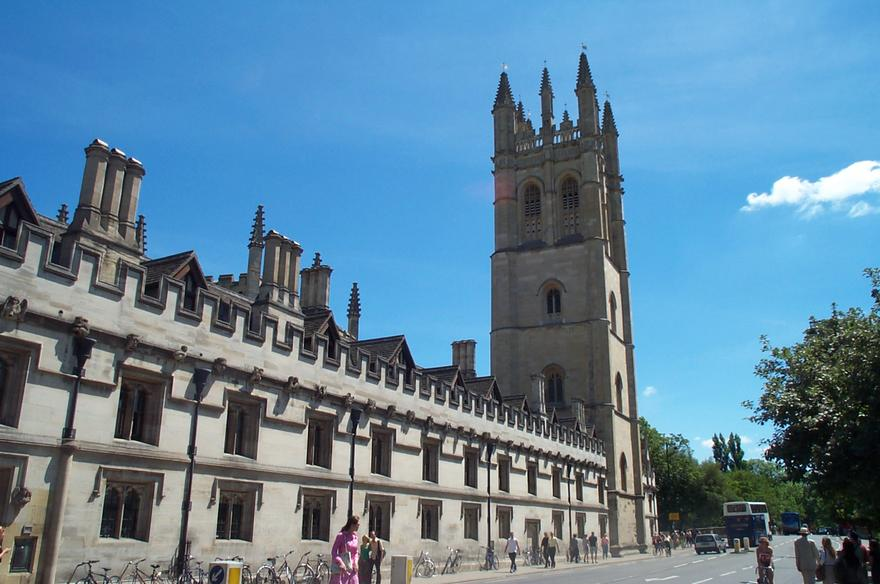
Magdalen College, Oxford

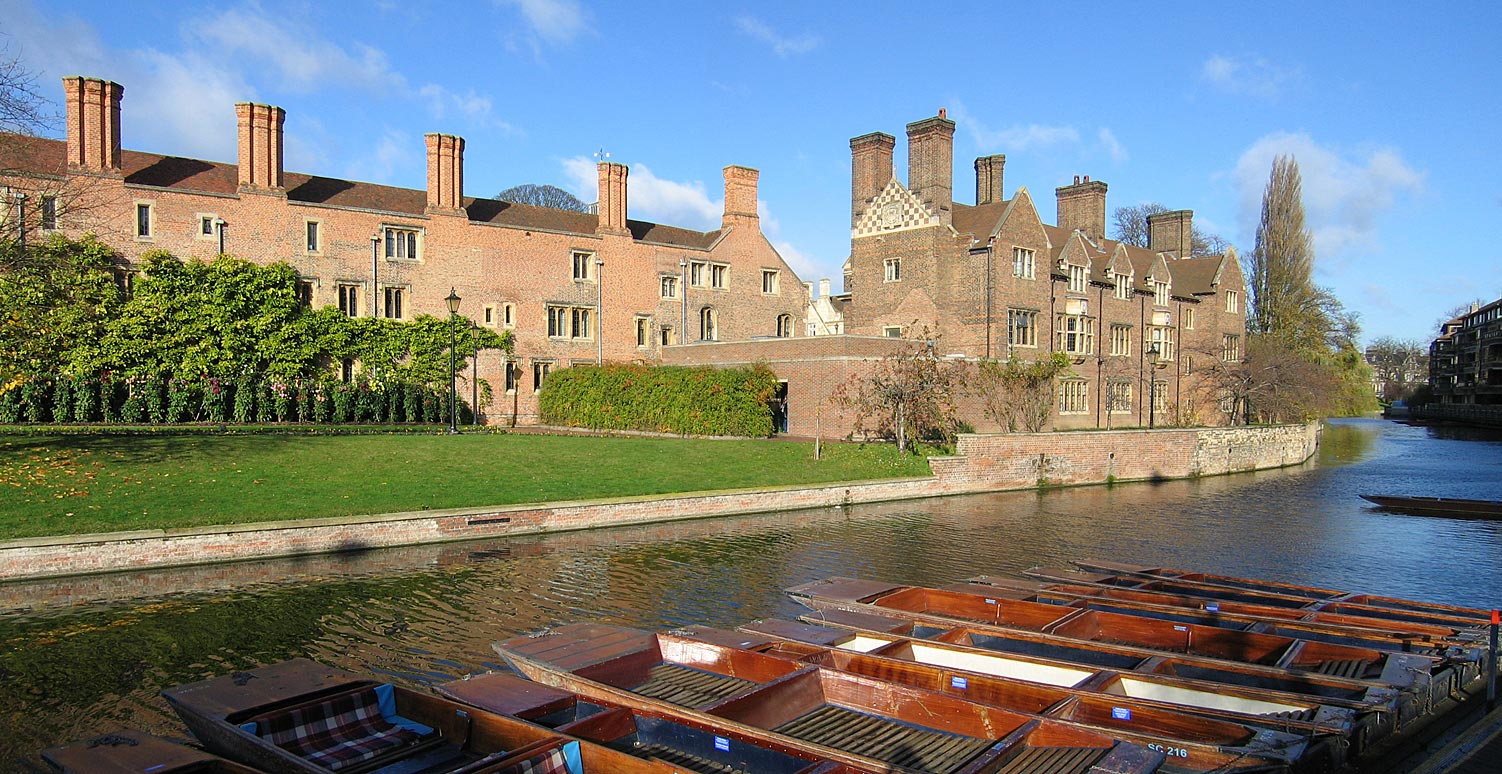
Magdalene College, Cambridge

Lewis began his academic career as an undergraduate student at Oxford, where he won a triple first, the highest honours in three areas of study. He was then elected a Fellow of Magdalen College, Oxford, where he worked for nearly thirty years, from 1925 to 1954. In 1954 he was awarded the newly founded chair of Mediaeval and Renaissance Literature at Cambridge University, and was elected a fellow of Magdalene College. Concerning his appointed academic field, he argued that there was no such thing as an English Renaissance. Much of his scholarly work concentrated on the later Middle Ages, especially its use of allegory. His The Allegory of Love (1936) helped reinvigorate the serious study of late medieval narratives such as the Roman de la Rose.

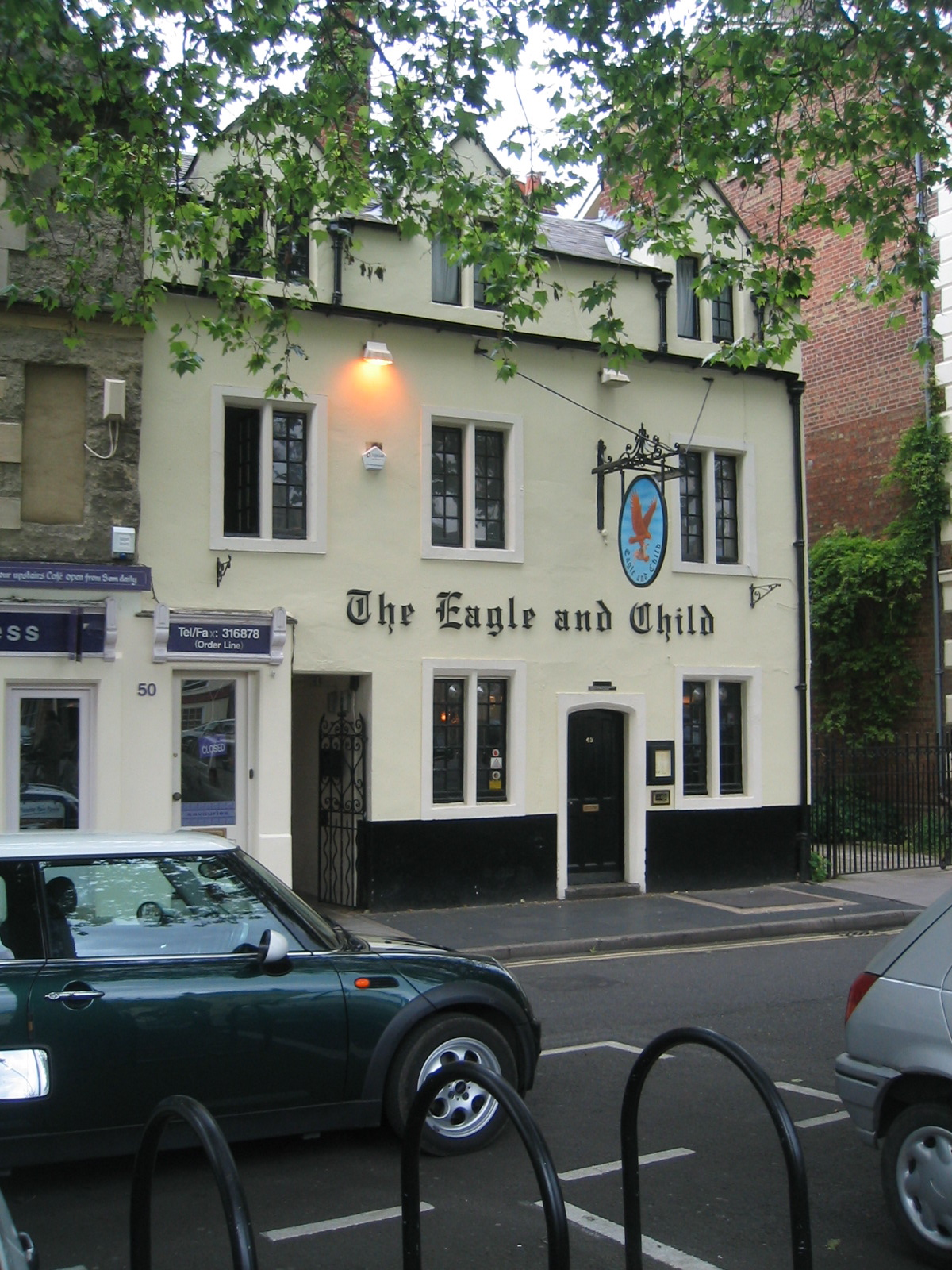
The Eagle and Child pub in Oxford where the Inklings met on Tuesday mornings in 1939

Lewis was commissioned to write the volume English Literature in the Sixteenth Century (Excluding Drama) for the Oxford History of English Literature. His book A Preface to Paradise Lost is still cited as a criticism of that work. His last academic work, The Discarded Image: An Introduction to Medieval and Renaissance Literature (1964), is a summary of the medieval world view, a reference to the "discarded image" of the cosmos.

Lewis was a prolific writer, and his circle of literary friends became an informal discussion society known as the "Inklings", including J. R. R. Tolkien, Nevill Coghill, Lord David Cecil, Charles Williams, Owen Barfield and his brother Warren Lewis. Glyer points to December 1929 as the Inklings' beginning date. Lewis's friendship with Coghill and Tolkien grew during their time as members of the Kolbítar, an Old Norse reading group that Tolkien founded and which ended around the time of the inception of the Inklings. At Oxford, he was the tutor of the poet John Betjeman, the theatre-critic Kenneth Tynan, the Catholic priest Bede Griffiths, the writer Roger Lancelyn Green and the Sufi scholar Martin Lings, among many other undergraduates. The religious and conservative Betjeman detested Lewis, whereas the anti-establishment Tynan retained a lifelong admiration for him.

Of Tolkien, Lewis writes in Surprised by Joy:

When I began teaching for the English Faculty, I made two other friends, both Christians (these queer people seemed now to pop up on every side) who were later to give me much help in getting over the last stile. They were HVV Dyson ... and JRR Tolkien. Friendship with the latter marked the breakdown of two old prejudices. At my first coming into the world I had been (implicitly) warned never to trust a Papist, and at my first coming into the English Faculty (explicitly) never to trust a philologist. Tolkien was both.

=== Novelist ===
In addition to his scholarly work, Lewis wrote several popular novels, including the science fiction Space Trilogy for adults and the Narnia fantasies for children. Most deal implicitly with Christian themes such as sin, humanity's fall from grace, and redemption.

His first novel after becoming a Christian was The Pilgrim's Regress (1933), which depicted his journey to Christianity in the allegorical style of John Bunyan's The Pilgrim's Progress. The book was poorly received by critics at the time, although David Martyn Lloyd-Jones, one of Lewis's contemporaries at Oxford, gave him much-valued encouragement. Asked by Lloyd-Jones when he would write another book, Lewis replied, "When I understand the meaning of prayer."

The Space Trilogy (also called the Cosmic Trilogy or Ransom Trilogy) dealt with what Lewis saw as the dehumanizing trends in contemporary science fiction. The first book, Out of the Silent Planet, was apparently written following a conversation with his friend Tolkien about these trends. Lewis agreed to write a "space travel" story and Tolkien a "time travel" one, but Tolkien never completed "The Lost Road", linking his Middle-earth to the modern world. Lewis's main character Elwin Ransom is based in part on Tolkien, a fact to which Tolkien alludes in his letters.

The second novel, Perelandra, depicts a new Garden of Eden on the planet Venus, a new Adam and Eve, and a new "serpent figure" to tempt Eve. The story can be seen as an account of what might have happened if the terrestrial Adam had defeated the serpent and avoided the Fall of Man, with Ransom intervening in the novel to "ransom" the new Adam and Eve from the deceptions of the enemy. The third novel, That Hideous Strength, develops the theme of nihilistic science threatening traditional human values, embodied in Arthurian legend.

Many ideas in the trilogy, particularly opposition to dehumanization as portrayed in the third book, are presented more formally in The Abolition of Man, based on a series of lectures by Lewis at Durham University in 1943. Lewis stayed in Durham, where he says he was overwhelmed by the magnificence of the cathedral. That Hideous Strength is in fact set in the environs of "Edgestow" university, a small English university like Durham, though Lewis disclaims any other resemblance between the two.

Walter Hooper, Lewis's literary executor, discovered a fragment of another science-fiction novel apparently written by Lewis called The Dark Tower. Ransom appears in the story but it is not clear whether the book was intended as part of the same series of novels. The manuscript was eventually published in 1977, though Lewis scholar Kathryn Lindskoog doubts its authenticity.

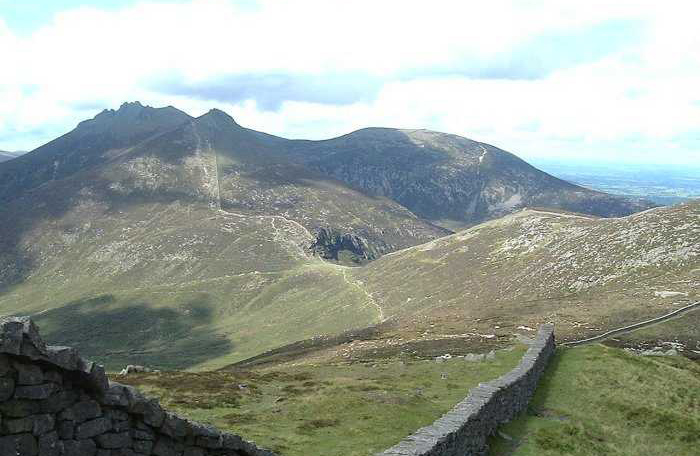
The Mountains of Mourne inspired Lewis to write The Chronicles of Narnia. About them, Lewis wrote "I have seen landscapes ... which, under a particular light, make me feel that at any moment a giant might raise his head over the next ridge."

The Chronicles of Narnia, considered a classic of children's literature, is a series of seven fantasy novels. Written between 1949 and 1954 and illustrated by Pauline Baynes, the series is Lewis's most popular work, having sold over 100 million copies in 41 languages (Kelly 2006) (Guthmann 2005). It has been adapted several times, complete or in part, for radio, television, stage and cinema. In 1956, the final novel in the series, The Last Battle, won the Carnegie Medal.

The books contain Christian ideas intended to be easily accessible to young readers. In addition to Christian themes, Lewis also borrows characters from Greek and Roman mythology, as well as traditional British and Irish fairy tales.

Lewis's last novel, Till We Have Faces, a retelling of the myth of Cupid and Psyche, was published in 1956. Although Lewis called it "far and away my best book", it was not as well-reviewed as his previous work.

==== Other works ====
Lewis wrote several works on Heaven and Hell. One of these, The Great Divorce, is a short novella in which a few residents of Hell take a bus ride to Heaven, where they are met by people who dwell there. The proposition is that they can stay if they choose, in which case they can call the place where they had come from "Purgatory", instead of "Hell", but many find it not to their taste. The title is a reference to William Blake's The Marriage of Heaven and Hell, a concept that Lewis found a "disastrous error". This work deliberately echoes two other more famous works with a similar theme: the Divine Comedy of Dante Alighieri, and Bunyan's The Pilgrim's Progress.

Another short work, The Screwtape Letters, which he dedicated to Tolkien, consists of letters of advice from the senior demon Screwtape to his nephew Wormwood on the best ways to tempt a particular human and secure his damnation. Lewis's last novel was Till We Have Faces, which he thought of as his most mature and masterly work of fiction but which was never a popular success. It is a retelling of the myth of Cupid and Psyche from the unusual perspective of Psyche's sister. It is deeply concerned with religious ideas, but the setting is entirely pagan, and the connections with specific Christian beliefs are left implicit.

Before Lewis's conversion to Christianity, he published two books: Spirits in Bondage, a collection of poems, and Dymer, a single narrative poem. Both were published under the pen name Clive Hamilton. Other narrative poems have since been published posthumously, including Launcelot, The Nameless Isle, and The Queen of Drum.

He also wrote The Four Loves, which rhetorically explains four categories of love: friendship, eros, affection, and charity.

In 2009 a partial draft was discovered of Language and Human Nature, which Lewis had begun co-writing with J. R. R. Tolkien, but which was never completed.

In 2024 an original poem was discovered in a collection of documents in Special Collections at the University of Leeds. Its Old English title, "Mód Þrýþe Ne Wæg", is not easily translated into modern English and references the epic poem Beowulf. The poem was addressed to the professor of English Eric Valentine Gordon and his wife Dr Ida Gordon. It was written under the pen name Nat Whilk, meaning "someone" in Old English.

=== Christian apologist ===
Lewis is also regarded by many as one of the most influential Christian apologists of his time, in addition to his career as an English professor and an author of fiction. Mere Christianity was voted best book of the 20th century by Christianity Today in 2000. He has been called "The Apostle to the Skeptics" due to his approach to religious belief as a sceptic, and his following conversion.

Lewis was very interested in presenting an argument from reason against metaphysical naturalism and for the existence of God. Mere Christianity, The Problem of Pain, and Miracles were all concerned, to one degree or another, with refuting popular objections to Christianity, such as the question, "How could a good God allow pain to exist in the world?" He also became a popular lecturer and broadcaster, and some of his writing originated as scripts for radio talks or lectures (including much of Mere Christianity).

According to George Sayer, losing a 1948 debate with Elizabeth Anscombe, also a Christian, led Lewis to re-evaluate his role as an apologist, and his future works concentrated on devotional literature and children's books. Anscombe had a completely different recollection of the debate's outcome and its emotional effect on Lewis. Victor Reppert also disputes Sayer, listing some of Lewis's post-1948 apologetic publications, including the second and revised edition of his Miracles in 1960, in which Lewis addressed Anscombe's criticism. Noteworthy too is Roger Teichman's suggestion in The Philosophy of Elizabeth Anscombe that the intellectual impact of Anscombe's paper on Lewis's philosophical self-confidence should not be over-rated: "... it seems unlikely that he felt as irretrievably crushed as some of his acquaintances have made out; the episode is probably an inflated legend, in the same category as the affair of Wittgenstein's Poker. Certainly, Anscombe herself believed that Lewis's argument, though flawed, was getting at something very important; she thought that this came out more in the improved version of it that Lewis presented in a subsequent edition of Miracles – though that version also had 'much to criticize in it'."

Lewis wrote an autobiography titled Surprised by Joy, which places special emphasis on his own conversion. He also wrote many essays and public speeches on Christian belief, many of which were collected in God in the Dock and The Weight of Glory and Other Addresses.

His most famous works, the Chronicles of Narnia, contain many strong Christian messages and are often considered allegory. Lewis, an expert on the subject of allegory, maintained that the books were not allegory, and preferred to call the Christian aspects of them "suppositional". As Lewis wrote in a letter to a Mrs. Hook in December 1958:

If Aslan represented the immaterial Deity in the same way in which Giant Despair [a character in The Pilgrim's Progress] represents despair, he would be an allegorical figure. In reality, he is an invention giving an imaginary answer to the question, "What might Christ become like, if there really were a world like Narnia and He chose to be incarnate and die and rise again in that world as He actually has done in ours?" This is not allegory at all.

Prior to his conversion, Lewis used the word "Moslem" to refer to Muslims, adherents of Islam; following his conversion, however, he started using "Mohammedans" and described Islam as a Christian heresy rather than an independent religion.

==== "Trilemma" ====
In a much-cited passage from Mere Christianity, Lewis challenged the view that Jesus was a great moral teacher but not God. He argued that Jesus made several implicit claims to divinity, which would logically exclude that claim:

I am trying here to prevent anyone saying the really foolish thing that people often say about Him: 'I'm ready to accept Jesus as a great moral teacher, but I don't accept his claim to be God.' That is the one thing we must not say. A man who was merely a man and said the sort of things Jesus said would not be a great moral teacher. He would either be a lunatic – on the level with the man who says he is a poached egg – or else he would be the Devil of Hell. You must make your choice. Either this man was, and is, the Son of God, or else a madman or something worse. You can shut him up for a fool, you can spit at him and kill him as a demon or you can fall at his feet and call him Lord and God, but let us not come with any patronising nonsense about his being a great human teacher. He has not left that open to us. He did not intend to.

Although this argument is sometimes called "Lewis's trilemma", Lewis did not invent it but rather developed and popularized it. It has also been used by the Christian apologist Josh McDowell in his book More Than a Carpenter. It has been widely repeated in Christian apologetic literature but largely ignored by professional theologians and biblical scholars.

Lewis's Christian apologetics, and this argument in particular, have been criticized. Philosopher John Beversluis described Lewis's arguments as "textually careless and theologically unreliable", and this particular argument as logically unsound and an example of a false dilemma. The Anglican New Testament scholar N. T. Wright criticizes Lewis for failing to recognize the significance of Jesus's Jewish identity and setting – an oversight which "at best, drastically short-circuits the argument" and which lays Lewis open to criticism that his argument "doesn't work as history, and it backfires dangerously when historical critics question his reading of the gospels", although he argues that this "doesn't undermine the eventual claim".

Lewis used a similar argument in The Lion, the Witch and the Wardrobe, when the old Professor advises his young guests that their sister's claims of a magical world must logically be taken as either lies, madness, or truth.

==== Universal morality ====
One of the main theses in Lewis's apologia is that there is a common morality known throughout humanity, which he calls "natural law". In the first five chapters of Mere Christianity, Lewis discusses the idea that people have a standard of behaviour to which they expect people to adhere. Lewis claims that people all over the earth know what this law is and when they break it. He goes on to claim that there must be someone or something behind such a universal set of principles.

These then are the two points that I wanted to make. First, that human beings, all over the earth, have this curious idea that they ought to behave in a certain way, and cannot really get rid of it. Secondly, that they do not in fact behave in that way. They know the Law of Nature; they break it. These two facts are the foundation of all clear thinking about ourselves and the universe we live in.

Lewis also portrays Universal Morality in his works of fiction. In The Chronicles of Narnia he describes Universal Morality as the "deep magic" which everyone knew.

In the second chapter of Mere Christianity Lewis recognizes that "many people find it difficult to understand what this Law of Human Nature ... is." And he responds first to the idea "that the Moral Law is simply our herd instinct" and second to the idea "that the Moral Law is simply a social convention". In responding to the second idea Lewis notes that people often complain that one set of moral ideas is better than another, but that this actually argues for there existing some "Real Morality" to which they are comparing other moralities. Finally, he notes that sometimes differences in moral codes are exaggerated by people who confuse differences in beliefs about morality with differences in beliefs about facts:

I have met people who exaggerate the differences, because they have not distinguished between differences of morality and differences of belief about facts. For example, one man said to me, "Three hundred years ago people in England were putting witches to death. Was that what you call the Rule of Human Nature or Right Conduct?" But surely the reason we do not execute witches is that we do not believe there are such things. If we did – if we really thought that there were people going about who had sold themselves to the devil and received supernatural powers from him in return and were using these powers to kill their neighbours or drive them mad or bring bad weather, surely we would all agree that if anyone deserved the death penalty, then these filthy quislings did. There is no difference of moral principle here: the difference is simply about matter of fact. It may be a great advance in knowledge not to believe in witches: there is no moral advance in not executing them when you do not think they are there. You would not call a man humane for ceasing to set mousetraps if he did so because he believed there were no mice in the house.

==== Animal theology ====
Lewis also wrote on animal theology. In The Problem of Pain (1940), he considered animal sentience and consciousness, the theological problem of animal suffering, predation, the effects of the Fall on non-human animals, and the possibility of animal immortality. In his 1947 essay "Vivisection", Lewis opposed vivisection, arguing that uncertainty about animal consciousness could not justify inflicting pain on animals.

=== Political views ===
Lewis eschewed political involvement and partisan politics, took little interest in transitory political issues, and held many politicians in disdain. He refused the honour of Commander of the British Empire for fear that his detractors might then use it to accuse him of holding a political viewpoint, and he saw his role as a non-partisan Christian apologist. His worldview was Christian, but he also did not believe in the establishment of Christian parties. He avoided the political sphere, although he was not ignorant of it.

Lewis did not see himself as a political philosopher, though his work The Abolition of Man (1943) defends objective value and the concept of natural law. Lewis referred to this work as almost his own favourite, although he felt it had been largely ignored. The Abolition of Man was not presented as something new. Instead, he paid attention to ideas, with the intent of recovering them. In The Abolition of Man, "Lewis offered the postmodern world a vision of reality that could make sense of our lived moral experiences, and he put forth a powerful defense of natural law as a necessary basis for "the very idea of a rule which is not tyranny or an obedience which is not slavery".

== Legacy ==
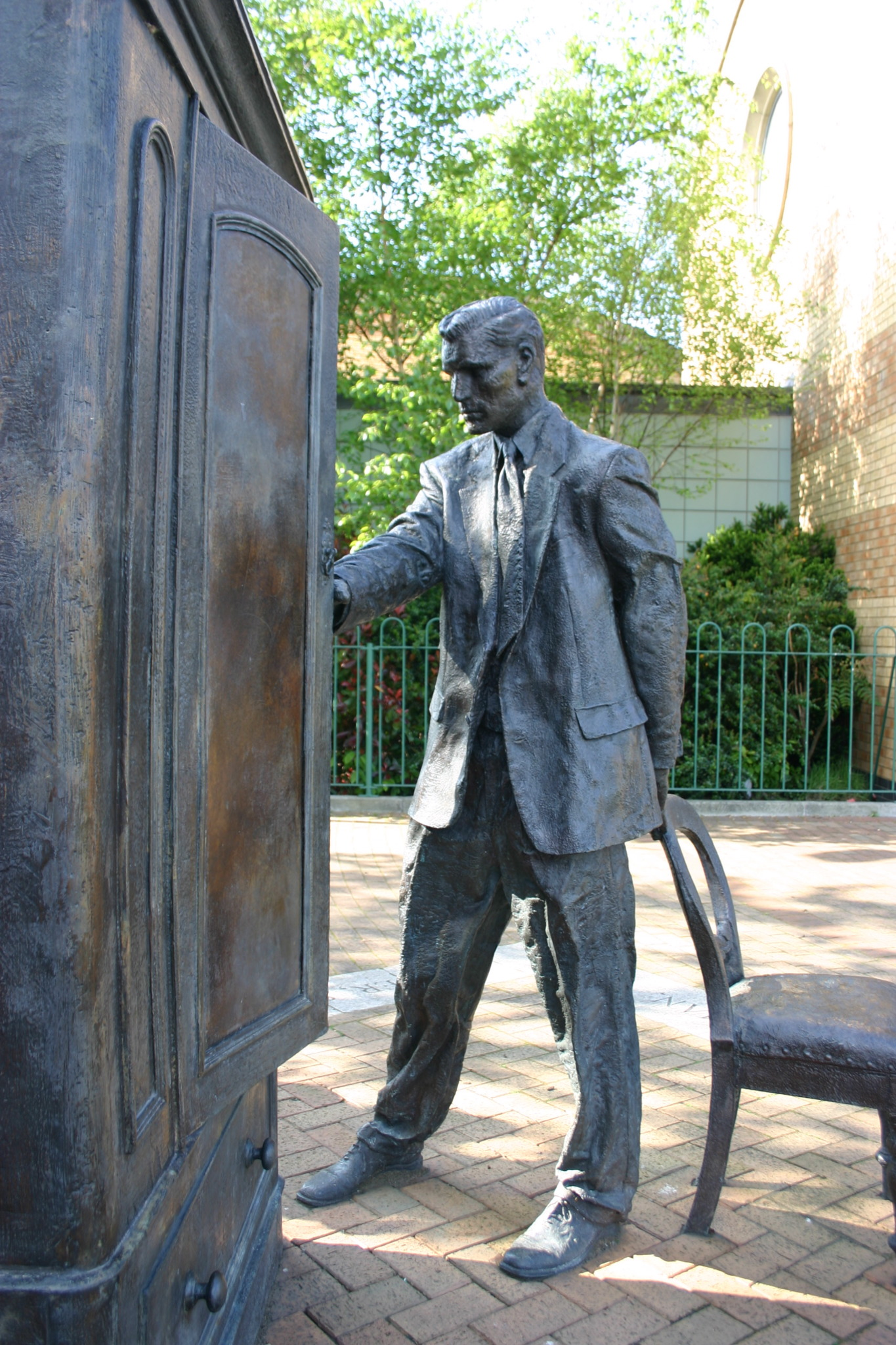
Ross Wilson's statue of Professor Kirke (Digory) in front of the wardrobe from The Lion, the Witch and the Wardrobe in East Belfast

Lewis continues to attract a wide readership. In 2008 The Times ranked him eleventh on their list of "the 50 greatest British writers since 1945". Readers of his fiction are often unaware of what Lewis considered the Christian themes of his works. His Christian apologetics are read and quoted by members of many Christian denominations. In 2013, on the 50th anniversary of his death, Lewis joined some of Britain's greatest writers recognized at Poets' Corner, Westminster Abbey. The dedication service, at noon on 22 November 2013, included a reading from The Last Battle by Douglas Gresham, younger stepson of Lewis. Flowers were laid by Walter Hooper, trustee and literary advisor to the Lewis Estate. An address was delivered by the former Archbishop of Canterbury Rowan Williams. The floor stone inscription is a quotation from an address by Lewis:

I believe in Christianity as I believe that the Sun has risen, not only because I see it but because by it I see everything else.

Lewis has been the subject of several biographies, a few of which were written by close friends, such as Roger Lancelyn Green and George Sayer. In 1985 the screenplay Shadowlands by William Nicholson dramatized Lewis's life and relationship with Joy Davidman Gresham. It was aired on British television starring Joss Ackland and Claire Bloom. This was also staged as a theatre play starring Nigel Hawthorne in 1989 and made into the 1993 feature film Shadowlands starring Anthony Hopkins and Debra Winger.

Many books have been inspired by Lewis, including A Severe Mercy by his correspondent and friend Sheldon Vanauken. The Chronicles of Narnia has been particularly influential. Modern children's literature has been more or less influenced by Lewis's series, such as Daniel Handler's A Series of Unfortunate Events, Eoin Colfer's Artemis Fowl, Philip Pullman's His Dark Materials and J. K. Rowling's Harry Potter. Pullman is an atheist and is known to be sharply critical of Lewis's work, accusing Lewis of featuring religious propaganda, misogyny, racism, and emotional sadism in his books. However, he has also modestly praised The Chronicles of Narnia for being a "more serious" work of literature in comparison with Tolkien's "trivial" The Lord of the Rings. Authors of adult fantasy literature such as Tim Powers have also testified to being influenced by Lewis's work.

Most of Lewis's posthumous work has been edited by his literary executor Walter Hooper. Kathryn Lindskoog, an independent Lewis scholar, argued that Hooper's scholarship is not reliable and that he has made false statements and attributed forged works to Lewis. Lewis's stepson, Douglas Gresham, denies the forgery claims, saying that "[t]he whole controversy thing was engineered for very personal reasons ... Her fanciful theories have been pretty thoroughly discredited."

A bronze statue of Lewis's character Digory from The Magician's Nephew stands in Belfast's Holywood Arches in front of the Holywood Road Library.

Several C. S. Lewis Societies exist around the world, including one which was founded in Oxford in 1982. The C.S. Lewis Society at the University of Oxford meets at Pusey House during term time to discuss papers on the life and works of Lewis and the other Inklings, and generally appreciate all things Lewisian.

Live-action film adaptations have been made of three of The Chronicles of Narnia: The Lion, the Witch, and the Wardrobe (2005), Prince Caspian (2008) and The Voyage of the Dawn Treader (2010).

Lewis is featured as a main character in The Chronicles of the Imaginarium Geographica series by James A. Owen. He is one of two characters in Mark St. Germain's 2009 play Freud's Last Session, which imagines a meeting between Lewis, aged 40, and Sigmund Freud, aged 83, at Freud's house in Hampstead, London, in 1939, as the Second World War is about to break out. In 2023 Freud's Last Session was released as a film starring Anthony Hopkins as Freud and Matthew Goode as Lewis. It had additional characters as well, including Anna Freud, played by Liv Lisa Fries.

In 2021 The Most Reluctant Convert, a biographical drama about Lewis's life and conversion, was released.

The CS Lewis Nature Reserve, on ground owned by Lewis, lies behind his house, The Kilns. There is public access.

== See also ==
- C.S. Lewis Institute
- Courtly love
- Johan Huizinga
- Marion E. Wade Center at Wheaton College, has the world's largest collection of works by and about Lewis
- D. W. Robertson Jr.

== Notes, references and sources ==
=== Sources ===
- "City that inspired Narnia fantasy". BBC News. 5 March 2004. Archived from the original on 9 July 2006.
- "Pullman attacks Narnia film plans". BBC News. 16 October 2005. Archived from the original on 23 November 2010.
- Carpenter, Humphrey (2006) [1978]. The Inklings of Oxford: C. S. Lewis, J. R. R. Tolkien, and Their Friends. HarperCollins. ISBN 978-0-00-774869-3.
- Clare, David (February 2010). "C. S. Lewis: An Irish Writer". Irish Studies Review. 18 (1): 17–38. doi:10.1080/09670880903533409. ISSN 0967-0882. S2CID 144348160. Archived from the original on 21 April 2021..
- Fiddes, Paul (1990). "C. S. Lewis the myth-maker". In Andrew Walker; James Patrick (eds.). A Christian for all Christians: essays in honour of C. S. Lewis. London: Hodder & Stoughton. pp. 132–55. ISBN 978-0340513842. [reprinted as Rumours of Heaven: essays in celebration of C. S. Lewis. Guildford: Eagle. 1998. ISBN 978-0863472503.]
- "History of the Building". Friends of Holy Trinity Church. Archived from the original on 22 January 2009.
- Guthmann, Edward (11 December 2005). "'Narnia' tries to appeal to the religious and secular". San Francisco Chronicle. Archived from the original on 21 October 2016.
- Haven, Cynthia (1 January 2006). "Lost in the shadow of C.S. Lewis' fame / Joy Davidman was a noted poet, a feisty Communist and a free spirit". San Francisco Chronicle. Archived from the original on 11 April 2016.
- Hilliard, Juli Cragg (9 December 2005). "Hear the Roar". Sarasota Herald-Tribune. Archived from the original on 5 August 2009.
- Kelly, Clint (Winter 2006). "Dear Mr. Lewis: The Narnia Author and His Young Readers". Response. Vol. 29, no. 1. Archived from the original on 9 March 2011.
- Kreeft, Peter (1982). Between Heaven and Hell: A Dialogue Somewhere Beyond Death with John F. Kennedy, C. S. Lewis & Aldous Huxley. InterVarsity Press. ISBN 978-0-87784-389-4.
- Lazo, Andrew (2004). Chance, Jane (ed.). Gathered Round Northern Fires: The Imaginative Impact of the Kolbítar. Tolkien and the Invention of Myth: A Reader. Lexington, KY: University of Kentucky Press. pp. 191–226. ISBN 978-0-8131-2301-1.
- Lewis, C. S. (1945) [1943]. "Preface". That Hideous Strength..
- Lewis, C. S. (2002b) [1946]. The Great Divorce. London: Collins. ISBN 978-0060652951.
- Lewis, C. S. (1997) [1952]. Mere Christianity. London: Collins. ISBN 978-0060652920.
- Lewis, C. S. (1961). A Grief Observed. London: Faber & Faber.
- Lewis, C. S. (1966a). Studies in Medieval and Renaissance Literature.
- Lewis, C. S. (1966b) [1955]. Surprised by Joy: The Shape of My Early Life. London: Harvest Books. Reprint: ISBN 978-0-15-687011-5.
- Lewis, C. S. (1984) [1966, 1955]. Surprised by Joy: The Shape of My Early Life. New York: Harcourt.
- Lewis, C. S. (1993). Hooper, Walter (ed.). All My Road Before Me: The Diary of C. S. Lewis 1922–27. London: HarperCollins.
- Lewis, C. S. (2000). Collected Letters. Vol. 1: Family Letters, 1905–1931. London: HarperCollins.
- Lewis, C. S. (2004) [2000]. Hooper, Walter (ed.). The Collected Letters. Vol. 1: Family Letters, 1905–1931. New York: HarperCollins. ISBN 978-0-06-072763-5.
- Lindskoog, Kathyrn (2001). Sleuthing C. S. Lewis: More Light In The Shadowlands. Mercer University Press. ISBN 978-0-86554-730-8.
- Lucretius, Titus (1916) [Composed 1st century BCE]. De Rerum Natura. Translated by Leonard, William Ellery. V:200–203. Archived from the original on 25 February 2021.
- Gresham, Douglas (2007). Behind The Wardrobe: An Interview Series with Douglas Gresham. Narnia Fans. Archived from the original on 23 February 2008.
- Martindale, Wayne; Root, Jerry (1990). The Quotable Lewis. Tyndale House. ISBN 978-0-8423-5115-7.
- McDowell, Josh (2001). More Than a Carpenter. Kingsway Publications. ISBN 978-0-85476-906-3.
- Murray, Iain (1990). David Martyn Lloyd-Jones: The Fight of Faith, 1939–1981. The Banner of Truth Trust. ISBN 978-0-85151-564-9.
- History of the Old Inn. 2007. Archived from the original on 13 February 2014.
- Pratt, Alf (6 December 1998). "LDS Scholars Salute Author C.S. Lewis at BYU Conference". The Salt Lake Tribune. Archived from the original on 7 October 2007.
- Tonkin, Boyd (11 November 2005). "CS Lewis: The literary lion of Narnia". The Independent. London. Archived from the original on 30 April 2007.
