= Letters to Malcolm =

Book by C.S. Lewis

- Author: C. S. Lewis
- Language: English
- Publisher: Geoffrey Bles
- Publication date: 1964
- Publication place: England

Letters to Malcolm: Chiefly on Prayer is a book by C. S. Lewis, published posthumously in 1964. The book takes the form of a series of letters to a fictional friend, "Malcolm", in which Lewis meditates on prayer as an intimate dialogue between man and God. Beginning with a discussion of "corporate prayer" and the liturgical service, Lewis goes on to consider practical and metaphysical aspects of private prayer, such as when to pray and where, ready-made prayer, petitionary prayer, prayer as worship, penitential prayer, and prayer for the dead. The concluding letter discusses "liberal" Christians, the soul and resurrection.

Letters to Malcolm is generally thought to be one of Lewis's less successful books and differs from his other books on Christianity in that it poses a number of questions which Lewis does not attempt to answer. Lewis moreover shows a reluctance to be as critical of radical theologians such as Alec Vidler and John Robinson as his imaginary friend Malcolm wants him to be.
