= William T. Kirkpatrick =

Irish teacher and grammar school headmaster

William Thompson Kirkpatrick (10 January 1848 - 22 March 1921) was an Irish teacher and grammar school headmaster. He is best known for having been the tutor of the two Lewis brothers from Belfast, Warnie Lewis and C. S. Lewis. C. S. Lewis, who would later become well known as a literary critic, novelist, and Christian apologist, lived as a resident pupil with Kirkpatrick from 1914-1917. In his autobiography, Lewis reports that he was significantly influenced by his tutor.

== Biography ==
=== Headmaster of Lurgan ===
Kirkpatrick was born to an agricultural family in 1848 at Boardmills, County Down. He was educated at Queen's College, Belfast in 1865-1868. At first following an ambition to be called into the Presbyterian ministry, Kirkpatrick followed up his college studies with three years of theological training at Assembly's College, Belfast, the standard place of instruction for ordination into this denomination in Ireland. He also became a grammar school teacher at the Royal Belfast Academical Institution. He was licensed by Assembly's in 1871. Instead of accepting a call to a pulpit, however, he continued to teach. Kirkpatrick's biographer Ian Wilson believes that Kirkpatrick quickly developed a strong reputation for aggressive teaching leadership; at any rate, in late 1872 the young "Inst" teacher put in his name as the prospective headmaster of the newly established County Armagh grammar school, Lurgan College. After a three-year delay, Kirkpatrick was taken on in January 1876 as the young College's 28-year-old headmaster.

Lurgan at the start of 1876 had only 16 pupils. The College trustees asked their selectee to take steps to ensure the long-term survival of the College. Kirkpatrick aggressively recruited day boys and boarding pupils, and enrolment increased to 73 in 1882. Kirkpatrick was helped in his responsibilities, starting with his marriage in July 1881, by his wife Louisa Smyth.

At full size, the College was able to support a Headmaster couple, two Assistant Masters, and a steward. The staff and Headmaster shared out teaching responsibilities, which centred on drilling the pupils in Latin, Greek, modern languages and mathematics in preparation for university. Despite its small size, Lurgan came to be seen as an Irish grammar school of the first rank, and its pupils collected more than their numerical share of the honours and prizes distributed to Irish students in those days. One of the College's students was the future Belfast solicitor Albert Lewis, who studied there in 1879-1880.

In 1899 Kirkpatrick abruptly departed from Lurgan College. Surviving correspondence indicates that the parting was on less than friendly terms. At some point around this time, Kirkpatrick, who had operated the College on explicitly Christian lines, appears to have ceased to profess his faith. He and Louisa moved, first to Cheshire and then to Great Bookham in Surrey, to carry on a new life as a gentleman-householder who carried out private, one-to-one tutoring of fee-paying pupils.

=== Tutor at Great Bookham ===
Kirkpatrick's biographer believes that the independent educator never tutored more than one or two young men at a time. The Belfast solicitor Albert Lewis retained fond memories of his year at Lurgan, but chose an Anglo-Irish pathway for his sons and had sent them successively to Malvern College in Worcestershire. Upon learning, first in 1913 and then in 1914, that older brother Warnie and younger brother 'Jack' were not doing well in public school, Mr. Lewis learned that a place was available at the Kirkpatrick home.

Warnie Lewis, who had not performed well academically at Malvern, was intensively tutored in 1913-1914 for a place at Sandhurst, in line with the older son's ambition of joining the British colours. These efforts were successful and he was entered into the British army establishment just before the start of World War I. Warnie's departure from Great Bookham in 1914 opened a place for C.S. 'Jack' Lewis, who could in no sense have been considered an academic failure at Malvern but who had not fit in with that College's culture at the time. Kirkpatrick, who appears to have been baulked by the demands of his Headmastership and then by his private tutoring responsibilities from carrying out an ideal tutorial regime, chose to subject the younger Lewis to an unusually intense course of study that combined the so-called Great Books with philosophy of all ages up to the present. Part of his goal, which he shared with Jack's fee-paying father Albert, was to help start the likely lad on a course that would create a significant scholar of the 20th century. The other part of this goal, which was conveyed only to Jack, was that his scholarly work would in no sense be Christian. By this time the Kirkpatrick C.S. Lewis saw had become a stern, ex-Calvinistic "rationalist of the old high and dry nineteenth-century type" with a strong bent toward formal logic, and he sought to transmit this worldview to his pupil. At the time, Lewis completely agreed with this position and goal.

Lewis's autobiography, Surprised by Joy (1955), conveys rueful comments to indicate the author's disbelief that a good-faith reader could understand his delight at the intellectual training provided by the Kirkpatrick tutorship. Lewis by this time had begun to grasp his own potential powers, and realized (both at the time and later) that a period of intense dialectical training, such as had been provided by Kirkpatrick, had been necessary to nurture them. This was his summary of the intensity of Kirkpatrick's influence:

My debt to him is very great, my reverence to this day undiminished.

In 1916 Lewis sat for a scholarship place at University College, Oxford, and was accepted. He returned to Kirkpatrick in the 1917 winter term to study mathematics in preparation for undergraduate life. Retiring from the profession of tutoring, Kirkpatrick remained at Great Bookham. He died in March 1921, age 73, leaving behind his widow Louisa and a single son, Louis Kirkpatrick, an electrical engineer. His estate was probated at over £10,000, a substantial sum for the time.
