= English Literature in the Sixteenth Century (Excluding Drama) =

1954 academic book by C. S. Lewis

English Literature in the Sixteenth Century (Excluding Drama) is an academic book written by twentieth-century English literary scholar C. S. Lewis as a contribution to the Oxford History of English Literature series and published in 1954.

The volume was written while Lewis was a Fellow and Tutor in English Literature at Magdalen College, Oxford and is considered a "classic volume" on English literary history. According to Stefan Collini, the book's central contention is the "denial of a sharp break between the Middle Ages and the Renaissance".

According to Justin Buckley Dyer and Micah J. Watson, English Literature in the Sixteenth Century is notably where Lewis coined the term "Barthianism" to refer to the modern Calvinist tendency to flatten "all things into common insignificance before the inscrutable Creator".

== Background ==
Commissioned as a volume in the old Oxford History of English Literature, edited by F. P. Wilson and Bonamy Dobrée, English Literature in the Sixteenth Century took Lewis around fifteen years to write. He signed the contract for the volume in 1935, but although the manuscript was submitted to Lewis's publishers by the beginning of the academic year (Michaelmas Term) of 1952, the editorial process continued for another year before it was finally complete.

It was published by Oxford University Press in 1954 and reprinted by OUP in 1959 and 1962.

According to Lewis, the book appeared in its "embryonic state" as the Clark Lectures, which he delivered at Trinity College, Cambridge in 1944, hosted by Cambridge historian George Macaulay Trevelyan. Harry Lee Poe notes that Lewis's series of lectures, "Prolegomena to Renaissance Poetry", delivered at Magdalen College in 1946, also played a "vital part in the writing of his massive project", allowing him to develop the material he would ultimately use in English Literature in the Sixteenth Century.

Lewis did not enjoy the process of writing the volume. He playfully dubbed the project "O HELL", a play on the acronym (OHEL) for the Oxford History of English Literature. According to Dr Robert Havard, one of the regular members of the Inklings from about 1934, it was the academic project Lewis "complained of most". Lewis wrote to the general editor, F. P. Wilson, that the "O HELL lies like a nightmare on my chest". According to Alistair McGrath, the writing of English Literature in the Sixteenth Century "exhausted [Lewis], draining him of both the energy and creativity that had characterised him as a younger man."

== Critical reception ==
Brown University's Leicester Bradner expressed mixed reactions to the work, which he said came as "a great satisfaction to all scholars in this field". In his review, published in Renaissance News, he said that Lewis's study contained "many good things", but he ultimately considered it a "disappointing performance" when taken as a whole and considered "as literary history".

Charles T. Harrison, in The Sewanee Review, compared English Literature in the Sixteenth Century to two other works on the time period, including James Bruce Ross and Mary Martin McLaughlin's The Portable Renaissance Reader and A Renaissance Treasury by Hiram Haydn and John Charles Nelson. Those three works, he said, represented "the three current views of the Renaissance".

According to Harrison, Lewis "comes close to arguing that there was no Renaissance and that it was a bad thing anyhow". He called the volume "vastly learned", noting its "distinguished individuality" and suggesting that it would "take its place among the perennially consulted monuments of sustained critical exposition". "The genius of the book is a general brilliance," he explained, "manifested hardly less in its sharp idiosyncrasies than in its compelling illuminations."

In particular, Harrison commended Lewis's success in "nailing the entrenched oversimplifications of conventional literary history: the easy discovery of literary relations, for example, or the easy derivation of literary qualities from their historical antecedents or from their social and intellectual milieus."

Nevertheless, he noted the danger of the reader "swallowing Mr. Lewis's own oversimplifications".

Writing in The Review of English Studies in 1956, G. D. Willcock called it "the most massive of the Oxford Histories of Literature to appear" and praising it as "in the full sense, erudite and closely packed". He noted that Lewis "even when under greatest pressure from the historian's duty, never loses his awareness of texture in the work considered—his sense of rhythm, melody, cadence, rhetorical shaping, of the placing and values of words."

Nonetheless, Willcock noted that it was "by no means an easy book to read" and highlighted what he perceived to be an overemphasis on "religious, moral, and utilitarian publications" as opposed to "what we consider 'literature' in the usual sense".

Scholars have noted the important contribution that English Literature in the Sixteenth Century made to Renaissance studies. William Calin argues, for example, that Lewis's thesis in the volume anticipated the scholarly rejection of a sharp break between the medieval and early modern periods:

His was perhaps the first major voice to denounce the old Burckhardtian orthodoxy—clichés about a Catholic and folkloric, pious and primitive Middle Ages happily giving way to our freethinking, Hellenic, and modern Renaissance, superior to the Middle Ages to the extent that enlightenment is superior to superstition and learning to ignorance.

Although Donald T. Williams disputes Calin's specific claim, Gene Edward Veith notes that his argument for a "continuum between the Middle Ages as the Renaissance is ... now widely accepted".

In his contribution to The Cambridge Companion to C. S. Lewis (2010), Dennis Danielson, Professor of English at the University of British Columbia, argued that English Literature in the Sixteenth Century constitutes a significant contribution to the study of intellectual history, as well as the history of literature. He called Lewis's introduction to the volume, entitled "New Learning and New Ignorance", "among the richest and most concentrated pieces of intellectual history he ever produced".

For his scholarship in the volume, Dyer and Watson also recognise Lewis as an "intellectual" historian as well as a "literary historian".

In 2022, HarperCollins republished English Literature in the Sixteenth Century (Excluding Drama), calling the volume "an incisive work" and "an invigorating overview of English literature from the Norman Conquest through the mid-seventeenth century".
