= The Great Divorce =

1945 novel by C. S. Lewis

- First edition
- Author: C. S. Lewis
- Original title: Who goes home?
- Language: English
- Genre: Religious, Christian
- Publisher: Geoffrey Bles (UK)
- Publication date: 1945
- Publication place: United Kingdom
- Media type: Hardcover & paperback
- Pages: 118 (hardback)
- Text: The Great Divorce online

The Great Divorce is a novel by the British author C. S. Lewis, published in 1945, based on a theological dream vision of his in which he reflects on the Christian conceptions of Heaven and Hell.

The working title was Who Goes Home? but the final name was changed at the publisher's insistence. The title refers to William Blake's poem The Marriage of Heaven and Hell. The Great Divorce was first printed as a serial in an Anglican newspaper called The Guardian in 1944 and 1945 and soon thereafter in book form.

== Plot summary ==
The narrator inexplicably finds himself in a grim and joyless city, the "grey town", where it rains continuously, even indoors, which is either Hell or Purgatory depending on whether or not one stays there. He eventually finds a bus stop for those who desire an excursion to some other place. ("The grey town" is only called such; the destination later turns out to be the foothills of Heaven). He waits in line for the bus and listens to the arguments between his fellow passengers. As they await the bus's arrival, many of them quit the line in disgust before the bus pulls up. The driver is an angel who casually shields his face from the passengers. Once the few remaining passengers have boarded, the bus flies upward, off the pavement into the grey, rainy sky.

As the bus ascends, it emerges from the rain clouds into a clear, pre-dawn sky. During the ascent, the passengers' bodies gradually change, becoming transparent, faint and vapor-like rather than solid. By the time the bus reaches its destination, the passengers, including the narrator, are revealed to be ghosts.

The country in which they arrive is the most beautiful they have ever seen. However, everything in the landscape, from the streams to the blades of grass, feels overwhelmingly solid in comparison with their insubstantial bodies. Even walking on the grass causes them great pain, as its blades pierce their shadowy feet. A single leaf is also too heavy for any of them to lift.

Shining figures, men and women whom they have known on Earth, come to meet them and to urge them to repent and walk into Heaven proper. They promise as the ghosts travel onward and upward that they will become more solid and thus feel less and less discomfort, and more truly real; this process is also in an aside called "thickening". These luminous psychopomps, deemed "spirits" to distinguish them from the insubstantial ghosts, offer to help them journey toward the mountains and the sunrise. (One of the earlier ghosts, the narrator learns with a start, had committed suicide by throwing himself under a train, whereas one of the final spirits had died peacefully in bed in a nursing home.)

Almost all of the ghosts choose to return to the grey town instead, giving various reasons and excuses. Much of the interest of the book lies in the recognition it awakens of the plausibility and familiarity–and the thinness and self-deception–of the excuses which the ghosts ultimately refuse to abandon, even though to do so would bring them to "reality" and "joy forevermore". A former bishop refuses, having grown so used to framing his faith in abstract, pseudo-intellectual terms that he can no longer definitively say whether he believes in God; an artist refuses, arguing that he must preserve the reputation of his school of painting; a bitter cynic predicts that Heaven is a trick (as is much else); a bully ("Big Man") is offended that people he believes beneath him are there; a nagging wife is angry that she will not be allowed to dominate her husband in Heaven. However one man corrupted on Earth by lust, which rides on his ghost in the form of an ugly lizard, permits an angel to kill the lizard (an agony for him) and becomes a little more solid, and journeys forward, out of the cautionary narrative.

The narrator, a writer when alive, is met by the writer George MacDonald; the narrator hails MacDonald as his mentor, just as Dante did when first meeting Virgil in the Divine Comedy; and MacDonald becomes the narrator's psychopomp in his journey, just as Virgil became Dante's. MacDonald explains that it is possible for a soul to choose to remain in Heaven despite having been in the grey town; for such souls, the goodness of Heaven will work backwards into their lives, turning even their worst sorrows into joy, and changing their experience on Earth to an extension of Heaven. Conversely, the evil of Hell works so that if a soul remains in, or returns to, the grey town, even any remembered happiness from life on Earth will lose its meaning, and the soul's experience on Earth would retrospectively become Hell.

Few of the ghosts realize that the grey town is, in fact, Hell. Indeed, it is not that much different from the life they led on Earth –joyless, friendless, monotonous and uncomfortable. It merely expands its sprawl forever with its new occupants, and becomes more and more isolating, with some characters whispering their fear of the "night" that is eventually to come. According to MacDonald, whilst it is possible to leave Hell and enter Heaven, doing so requires turning away from the cherished evils (repentance) that took them to Hell in the first place; or, as is characterized by Lewis, embracing ultimate and unceasing joy itself. This is most grossly and strikingly illustrated in an encounter of a blessed woman who had come to meet her husband: She is surrounded by gleaming attendants whilst he shrinks down to invisibility as he uses a collared tragedian who is chained to him—representative of his persistent use of the self-punishing emotional blackmail of others—to speak for him. The narrator is unsure whether her husband had become an insect crawling on this chain, or if his sin had, ultimately, consumed him.

Penultimately MacDonald has the narrator crouch down to look at a tiny crack in the soil, and tells him that the bus came up through a crack no bigger than that, which contained the once vast grey town, which is actually minuscule to the point of being invisible compared with the immensity of Heaven and reality. An inconclusive dialogue about the unfathomable mysteries of eschatology and soteriology ensues featuring the visions of Swedenbourg and Hildegard of Bingen, the crux of the matter being eternity vis-à-vis time.

In answer to the narrator's question, MacDonald confirms that when he writes about it "Of course you should tell them it is a dream!" Towards this end, the narrator expresses his terror of remaining a ghost in the advent of full daybreak in Heaven, comparing the weight of the sunlight on a ghost as like having large blocks fall on one's body –at which point his falling books awaken him at his desk during The Blitz.

The framing of the dream follows that of The Pilgrim's Progress in which the protagonist dreams of judgment day in the House of the Interpreter. The (metaphysical) use of chess imagery as well as the correspondence of dream elements to aspects of the narrator's waking life is reminiscent of Alice's Adventures in Wonderland and Through the Looking-Glass. The book ends with the narrator awakening from his dream of Heaven into the unpleasant reality of wartime Britain, in conscious imitation of the "First Part" of The Pilgrim's Progress, the last sentence of which is: "So I awoke, and behold: It was a Dream."

== Sources ==
Lewis's diverse sources for this work include the works of St. Augustine, Dante Aligheri, John Milton, John Bunyan, Emanuel Swedenborg and Lewis Carroll, as well as Charles F. Hall, an American science fiction author whose name Lewis had forgotten but whose work he mentions in his preface (The Man Who Lived Backwards). George MacDonald, whom Lewis utilizes as a character in the story, Dante, Prudentius and Jeremy Taylor are alluded to in the text of chapter 9.

== Stage adaptation ==
Philadelphia playwright and actor Anthony Lawton's original adaptation of The Great Divorce has been staged several times by Lantern Theater Company, including a weeklong run in February 2012. It also was adapted by Robert Smyth at Lamb's Players Theatre in San Diego, California, in 2004, and was included in their mainstage season for that year. Smyth originally adapted it for a C. S. Lewis conference in Oxford and Cambridge, England, before securing permission to include it in their season a year later.

In 2007 the Magis Theatre Company of New York City presented their adaptation in an off-Broadway run at Theatre 315 in the Theatre District with music by award-winning composer Elizabeth Swados and puppets by Ralph Lee. Lauded by the New York Times for its imagination, theatrical skill and daring, theatre critic Neil Genzlinger called the production thought provoking "with plenty to say to those interested in matters of the spirit." In the following years Magis worked closely with the C. S. Lewis estate to make its adaptation available to over a dozen theatre companies from Canada to Ecuador. The Taproot Theatre of Seattle chose the Magis adaptation to open its new Theater Space in 2010 and extended the run due to popular demand. The Pacific Theatre Company presented the Magis adaptation in its 2010–2011 season.

In late 2012, the Fellowship for the Performing Arts received permission from the C. S. Lewis estate to produce a stage version of The Great Divorce. The production premiered in Phoenix on 14 December 2013, toured throughout the United States from 2014 to 2016, opened briefly in 2020 and resumed in 2021.

== Motion picture ==
In 2010, Mpower Pictures and Beloved Pictures announced that they were working on a film adaptation of The Great Divorce. Stephen McEveety was to lead the production team and author N. D. Wilson had been tapped to write the script. A first draft of the script was finalized by N.D. Wilson in 2011. A 2013 release was originally planned for the film. As of 2025 it has not yet been produced.
