= Bruce L. Edwards =

American journalist

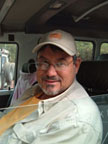
- Edwards in January 2007
- Born: September 5, 1952; Akron, Ohio, U.S.
- Died: October 28, 2015 (aged 63); Katy, Texas, U.S.
- Occupations: Scholar, professor, and author
- Spouse: Joan Christine Edwards (m. 1973–2015)
- Children: Four

Bruce L. Edwards (September 5, 1952 – October 28, 2015) was professor emeritus of English and Africana Studies and Associate Vice President for Online Programs and E-learning Services at Bowling Green State University in Bowling Green, Ohio, where he was a faculty member and administrator from 1981 to 2012. He was a leading authority on C. S. Lewis, a British writer and literary scholar.

== Early life and education ==
Edwards was born in Akron, Ohio, where he attended Akron Public Schools. He received an A.A. in Biblical Studies at Florida College in Temple Terrace, Florida, and then his B.A. in English from the University of Missouri–Rolla in Rolla, Missouri, in 1977. In 1979, he received his master's degree in English from Kansas State University in Manhattan, Kansas, followed by his Ph.D. in literature and rhetoric from the University of Texas at Austin in Austin, Texas, in 1981, where his dissertation was on the literary criticism of C. S. Lewis, a British literary scholar.

== Career ==
He served as a Fulbright Program fellow in Nairobi, Kenya from 1999 to 2000. He taught at Daystar University. In 1988, he was the S. W. Brooks Memorial Professor of Literature at the University of Queensland in Brisbane.

From 1989 to 1990, he was a Bradley Research Fellow at The Heritage Foundation in Washington, D.C..

=== C.S. Lewis focus ===
Edwards was a scholar and expert on C. S. Lewis. In 2007, he served as general editor for the four volume reference set, C. S. Lewis: Life, Works, and Legacy (Praeger Perspectives, 2007), a comprehensive treatment of C. S. Lewis's life and times with more than 40 worldwide contributors.

He authored two books on Lewis, including A Rhetoric of Reading: C. S. Lewis’s Defense of Western Literacy, and The Taste of the Pineapple: Essays on C. S. Lewis as Reader, Critic, and Imaginative Writer. He also authored essays about Lewis and the Inklings, and maintained a website on the life and works of C. S. Lewis.

He also published several textbooks for college students, including, Roughdrafts (Houghton-Mifflin, 1987), Processing Words (Prentice Hall, 1988), and Searching for Great Ideas (1st and 2nd editions; Harcourt, 1989; 2nd ed., 1992).

Edwards' authored two books on The Chronicles of Narnia, including Not a Tame Lion (Tyndale, 2005) and Further Up, Further In: Understanding C. S. Lewis’s The Lion, the Witch and the Wardrobe.

In 2005, he was the recipient of a Fulbright-Hays grant to take a contingent of public and private educators to Tanzania for six weeks with the goal of establishing internet-based educational opportunities for both Midwestern U.S. and Tanzanian students.

== Personal life ==
Edwards and his wife, Joan, lived in Willow, Alaska, following his 2012 retirement. They had four children.

== Death ==
In October 2015, while visiting Katy, Texas, Edwards experienced an aortic aneurysm, and died from it at Houston Methodist West Hospital on October 28, 2015, at age 63.
