= The Allegory of Love =

Book by C. S. Lewis

- First edition (publ. Clarendon Press)
- Author: C. S. Lewis
- Language: English
- Publisher: Clarendon Press
- Publication date: 1936
- Publication place: United Kingdom

The Allegory of Love: A Study in Medieval Tradition (1936), by C. S. Lewis (ISBN 0192812203), is an exploration of the allegorical treatment of love in the Middle Ages and the Renaissance, which was published on 21 May 1936.

In the first chapter, Lewis traces the development of the idea of courtly love from the Provençal troubadours to its full development in the works of Chrétien de Troyes. It is here that he sets forth a famous characterization of "the peculiar form which it [courtly love] first took; the four marks of Humility, Courtesy, Adultery, and the Religion of Love"—the last two of which "marks" have, in particular, been the subject of a good deal of controversy among later scholars. In the second chapter, Lewis discusses the medieval evolution of the allegorical tradition in such writers as Bernard Silvestris and Alain de Lille.

The remaining chapters, drawing on the points made in the first two, examine the use of allegory and personification in the depiction of love in a selection of poetic works, beginning with the Roman de la Rose. The focus, however, is on English works: the poems of Chaucer, Gower's Confessio Amantis and Usk's Testament of Love, the works of Chaucer's epigones, and Spenser's Faerie Queene.

The book is ornamented with quotations from poems in many languages, including Classical and Medieval Latin, Middle English, and Old French. The piquant English translations of many of these are Lewis's own work.
