= Peter Kreeft =

American professor of philosophy (born 1937)

- Kreeft, c. 2006
- Born: Peter John Kreeft; March 16, 1937 (age 89); Paterson, New Jersey, U.S.

Education
- Education: Calvin College (BA); Fordham University (MA, PhD)

Philosophical work
- Era: 20th-century philosophy
- Region: Western philosophy
- School: Christian philosophy
- Main interests: Christian apologetics

Peter John Kreeft (/kreɪft/; born March 16, 1937) is an American professor of philosophy at Boston College and The King's College. A convert to Catholicism, he is the author of over eighty books on Christian philosophy, theology and apologetics. He also formulated, together with Ronald K. Tacelli, Twenty Arguments for the Existence of God in their Handbook of Christian Apologetics.

== Academic career ==
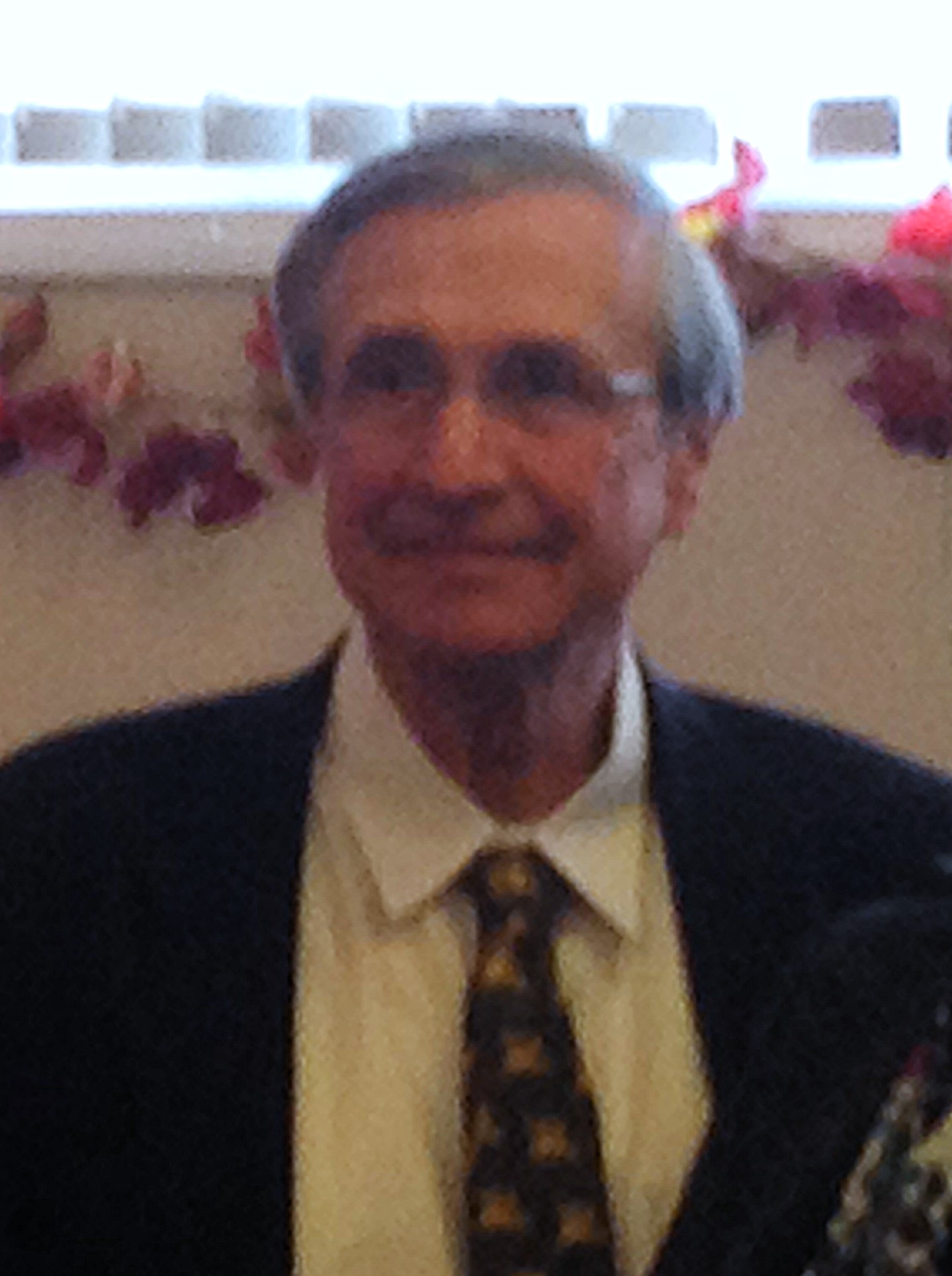
Kreeft in Nova Scotia, 2013

Peter John Kreeft was born March 16, 1937, in Paterson, New Jersey, the son of John and Lucy Kreeft. He graduated in 1955 from Eastern Christian High School, where his class hymn was sung at graduation ceremonies. Raised in Wyckoff, New Jersey, he took his BA at Calvin College (1959) and an MA at Fordham University (1961). He completed his doctoral studies in 1965, also at Fordham, where he completed a dissertation under the direction of W. Norris Clarke. He subsequently completed his post-graduate studies at Yale University.

Kreeft joined the philosophy faculty of the Department of Philosophy of Boston College in 1965. He has debated several academics on issues related to God's existence. Shortly after he began teaching at Boston College, he was challenged to a debate on the existence of God between himself and Paul Breines, an atheist and history professor, which was attended by a majority of undergraduate students. Kreeft later used many of the arguments in this debate to create the Handbook of Christian Apologetics with then undergraduate student Ronald K. Tacelli. In 1971, Kreeft published an article titled "Zen In Heidegger's 'Gelassenheit'" in the peer-reviewed journal International Philosophical Quarterly, of Fordham University. In 1994, he was an endorser of the document "Evangelicals and Catholics Together". He also formulated, with R. Tacelli, "Twenty Arguments for the Existence of God".

== Conversion to Catholicism ==
Kreeft converted from Calvinism to Catholicism during his college years. A key turning point came when he was asked by a Calvinist professor to investigate the claims of the Catholic Church that it traced itself to the early Church. He said that, on his own, he "discovered in the early Church such Catholic elements as the centrality of the Eucharist, the real presence, prayers to saints, devotion to Mary, an insistence on visible unity, and apostolic succession."

The "central and deciding" factor for his conversion was "the Church's claim to be the one Church historically founded by Christ." He reportedly applied C. S. Lewis's trilemma (that either Jesus is a lunatic, a liar, or the Lord): "I thought, just as Jesus made a claim about His identity that forces us into one of only two camps ... so the Catholic Church’s claim to be the one true Church, the Church Christ founded, forces us to say either that this is the most arrogant, blasphemous and wicked claim imaginable, if it is not true, or else that she is just what she claims to be."

According to Kreeft's personal account, his conversion to Catholic Christianity was influenced by, among other things, Gothic architecture and Thomistic philosophy, the writings of St. John of the Cross, the logic of asking saints to pray for us, and a visit to St. Patrick's Cathedral in New York City when he was twelve years old, "feeling like I was in heaven ... and wondering why, if Catholics got everything else wrong, as I had been taught, they got beauty so right..."

Although a Catholic, he places central emphasis on the unity between Catholics and Protestants.

== Bibliography ==
=== Books ===
- C. S. Lewis: A Critical Essay (1969)
- Love Is Stronger Than Death. 1979.
- Heaven: The Heart’s Deepest Longing (1980)
- Between Heaven and Hell: A Dialog Somewhere Beyond Death with John F. Kennedy, C. S. Lewis, and Aldous Huxley (1982)
- The Unaborted Socrates: A Dramatic Debate on the Issues Surrounding Abortion (1983)
- The Best Things in Life: A Contemporary Socrates Looks at Power, Pleasure, Truth & the Good Life (1984)
- Yes or No?: Straight Answers to Tough Questions about Christianity (1984)
- Making Sense Out of Suffering (1986)
- Fundamentals of the Faith: Essays in Christian Apologetics (1988)
- Everything You Ever Wanted To Know About Heaven... But Never Dreamed of Asking (1990)
- Making Choices: Practical Wisdom for Everyday Moral Decisions (1990)
- You can understand the Old Testament: A Book-by-Book Guide for Catholics (1990)
- Summa of the Summa (1990) — Summa Theologica edited and explained for beginners
- Three Philosophies of Life (1990) — Ecclesiastes (life as vanity), Job (life as suffering), Song of Songs (life as love)
- Prayer: The Great Conversation (1991) — Straight answers to tough questions
- Back to Virtue (1992) — Reprint of For Heaven's Sake: The Rewards of the Virtuous Life (1986)
- Shorter Summa (1993) — Shorter version of Kreeft's Summa of the Summa
- Christianity for Modern Pagans: Pascal's Pensees (1993)
- Your Questions, God's Answers (1994) — Solid responses for Catholic teens
- Handbook of Christian Apologetics (with Ronald K. Tacelli) (1994)
- C. S. Lewis for the Third Millennium (1994) — Six essays on Lewis' Abolition of Man
- Shadow-Lands of C.S. Lewis: The Man Behind the Movie (1994)
- Handbook of Christian Apologetics (Pocket Version) (1994)
- The Angel and the Ants: Bringing Heaven Closer to Your Daily Life (1994)
- Talking to Your Children About Being Catholic (1995) — Charles Rich, editor; essays by various authors
- Angels (and Demons): What Do We Really Know About Them? (1995)
- Ecumenical Jihad: Ecumenism and the Culture Wars (1996)
- The Journey: A Spiritual Roadmap For Modern Pilgrims (1996)
- The Snakebite Letters: Devilishly Devious Secrets for Subverting Society as Taught in Tempter's Training School (1998)
- A Refutation of Moral Relativism: Interviews with an Absolutist (1999)
- Prayer for Beginners (2000)
- Catholic Christianity (2001)
- Socrates Meets Jesus (1987/2002) — Socratic dialogue with students of Harvard University's Divinity School
- How to Win the Culture War: A Christian Battle Plan for a Society in Crisis (2002)
- Celebrating Middle Earth: Lord of the Rings (2002) — On western civilization
- Three Approaches to Abortion: a thoughtful and compassionate guide to today's most controversial issue (2002)
- Philosophy 101 by Socrates (2002) — An introduction to philosophy via Plato's Apology
- Socrates Meets Machiavelli (2003) — Socratic dialogue between Socrates and Machiavelli
- Socrates Meets Marx (2003) — Socratic dialogue between Socrates and Karl Marx
- The God Who Loves You (2004)
- Socratic Logic (2005) — A textbook on classical logic
- You Can Understand the Bible (2005) — a combination of his previous books You Can Understand the Old Testament: A Book-by-Book Guide for Catholics (1990) and Reading and Praying the New Testament: A Book-by-Book Guide for Catholics (1992)
- Socrates Meets Sartre: Father Of Philosophy Meets The Founder of Existentialism (2005)
- The Philosophy of Tolkien: The Worldview Behind "The Lord of the Rings" (2005)
- The Sea Within (2006)
- Socrates Meets Descartes (2007) — The Father of Philosophy Analyzes the Father of Modern Philosophy's Discourse on Method
- The Philosophy of Jesus (2007) — On the wisdom of Jesus
- Pocket Guide to the Meaning of Life (2007)
- Before I Go (2007) — Letters to Children About What Really Matters
- I Surf Therefore I Am (2008) — An exploration of Surfing
- Because God Is Real: Sixteen Questions, One Answer (2008)
- Jesus-Shock (2008)
- Socrates Meets Kant (2009) — The Father of Philosophy Meets His Most Influential Modern Child
- If Einstein Had Been a Surfer (2009) — A Philosophy of Surfing
- Between Allah & Jesus: what Christians Can Learn from Muslims (2010)
- Socrates Meets Hume (2010) — The Father of Philosophy Meets the Father of Modern Skepticism
- An Ocean Full of Angels (2011)
- Summa Philosophica (2012) — 110 Key Questions in Philosophy
- Jacob's Ladder (2013) — Ten Steps to Truth
- Charisms: Visions, Tongues, Healing, etc. (feat. Dave Nevins) (2013) — catalysts to "two-way" interactive prayer
- Socrates Meets Kierkegaard (2014) — Questions the founder of Christian existentialism
- 52 Big Ideas (2020) — From 32 Great Minds
- Practical Theology (2014) — Spiritual Direction from Aquinas
- Letters to an Atheist (2014) — Wrestling with Faith
- Philosophy 101 by Socrates: An Introduction to Philosophy Via Plato's Apology : (Forty Things Philosophy is According to History's First and Wisest Philosopher (2014)
- The Philosopher's Bench (2015)(DVD) — Catholic philosophers Peter Kreeft and Thomas Howard bring philosophy to the 'man in the street'
- I Burned for Your Peace: Augustine's Confessions Unpacked (2016) — Snippets and commentary from one of the most beloved books in the world
- How to Be Holy (2016) — First Steps in Becoming a Saint
- Catholics and Protestants (2017) — What Can We Learn from Each Other?
- Between One Faith and Another (2017) — Engaging Conversations on the World's Great Religions
- Forty Reasons I am a Catholic (2018)
- Doors in the Walls of the World (2018) — Signs of Transcendence in the Human Story
- The Platonic Tradition (2018) 8 lectures "for beginners" on the essence of the Platonic tradition throughout philosophical history
- Socrates' Children, 4 vols. (2019) — The 100 Greatest Philosophers
- Wisdom of the Heart (2020) — The Good, the True, and the Beautiful at the Center of Us All
- How To Destroy Western Civilization And Other Ideas From The Cultural Abyss (2021)
- The Greatest Philosopher Who Ever Lived (2021)
- Food for the Soul: Reflections on the Mass Readings 3 vols. (2023)
- What Would Socrates Say? (2024) — An Introduction to Philosophy by the Socratic Method
- The Two Greatest Novels Ever Written: The Wisdom of The Lord of the Rings and The Brothers Karamazov (2025)
