= George Sayer (biographer) =

British writer and teacher

- Born: George Sydney Benedict Sayer; 1 June 1914; Bradfield, Berkshire, England
- Died: 20 October 2005 (aged 91); Malvern, Worcestershire, England
- Education: Magdalen College, Oxford
- Occupations: Teacher, author
- Spouses: Moira Casey (m. 1940; died 1977); Margaret Cronin (m. 1983)
- Writing career
- Genre: Biography
- Subject: C. S. Lewis

George Sydney Benedict Sayer (1 June 1914 – 20 October 2005) was a teacher at Malvern College, trustee of the Lewis estate and probably best known for his biography of the author C. S. Lewis.

== Career ==
Sayer was born at Bradfield, Berkshire Bradfield in Berkshire, England. He was educated at Glenalmond College Trinity College, Glenalmond, in Perthshire, Scotland, and at Magdalen College, Oxford, where he was tutored by C. S. Lewis. He joined the staff of Malvern College in 1945 after having been a captain in the British Army Intelligence Corps on account of his fluent German. Sayer became Head of English in 1949.

Lewis and Sayer became close friends to the extent that Lewis sought Sayer's advice when considering marrying Joy Gresham. On Lewis's death, Sayer was made a trustee of the Lewis estate.

Sayer was also a close friend of J. R. R. Tolkien. Excerpts from The Hobbit and The Lord of the Rings were recorded in Malvern in 1952, at the home of George Sayer. The recordings were later issued on long-playing gramophone records. In the liner notes for J. R. R. Tolkien Reads and Sings his The Hobbit & The Fellowship of the Ring, George Sayer wrote that Tolkien would relive the book as they walked and compared parts of the Malvern Hills to the White Mountains of Gondor.

Jeremy Paxman, a pupil at Malvern College from 1964 to 1968, described Sayer as "the most wonderful, inspirational teacher a profoundly decent and compassionate man ... the sort of teacher you dream of having".

== Personal life ==
Sayer converted to Catholicism in 1935 through the spiritual counsel of a Catholic priest. Sayer's conversion introduced a new dimension into his relationship with Lewis.

Sayer's was married to Moira Casey from 1940 to her death in 1977, from cancer. In 1983 Sayer married Margaret Cronin.

Sayer died in Malvern, Worcestershire on 20 October 2005, at the age of 91.

== Major work ==
Sayer, George (1988) Jack: C.S. Lewis and His Times. Part memoir and part biography. The work is recommended by Douglas Gresham as one of the very best C. S. Lewis biographies available.
