= Surprised by Joy =

Partial autobiography about the author's conversion to Christianity by C.S. Lewis

Surprised by Joy: The Shape of My Early Life
- First edition (UK)
- Author: C. S. Lewis
- Language: English
- Genre: Autobiography
- Publisher: Geoffrey Bles (UK); Harcourt Brace (US)
- Publication date: 1955
- Publication place: United Kingdom
- Media type: Paperback
- Pages: 252
- OCLC: 28289338

Surprised by Joy: The Shape of My Early Life is a partial autobiography published by C. S. Lewis in 1955. The work describes Lewis's life from very early childhood (born 1898) until his conversion to Christianity in 1931, but does not go beyond that date.

The title comes from William Wordsworth's poem "Surprised by Joy".

== Overview ==
Lewis' purpose in writing was not primarily historical. His aim was instead to identify and describe the events surrounding his accidental discovery of and consequent search for the phenomenon he labeled "Joy", his best translation of the idea of (German) Sehnsucht. This Joy was so intense for something so good and so high up it could not be explained with words. He is struck with "stabs of joy" throughout his life. "Joy is distinct not only from pleasure in general but even from aesthetic pleasure. It must have the stab, the pang, the inconsolable longing."

Overall, the book contains less detail concerning specific events than a typical autobiography, although it is not devoid of information about his life. Lewis recounts and remembers his early years with a measure of amusement sometimes mixed with pain. However, while he does describe his life, the principal theme of the book is Joy as he defined it for his own purpose.

Lewis ultimately discovers the true nature and purpose of Joy and its place in his own life. The book's last two chapters cover the end of his search as he makes the leap from atheism to theism and then from theism to Christianity and, as a result, he realizes that Joy is like a "signpost" to those lost in the woods, pointing the way, and that its appearance is not as important "when we have found the road and are passing signposts every few miles."

Contrary to assumptions, the title of Surprised by Joy was not conceived as a tribute to Lewis's wife, the American poet and writer Joy Gresham. Gresham came into Lewis's life during the course of the book's writing and assisted in editing its final draft. But Joy only became Lewis's wife two years after the memoir's publication. Consequently, several of Lewis's friends and contemporaries were quick to notice the coincidence, frequently remarking that Lewis had really been "Surprised by Joy."
