= Till We Have Faces =

1956 novel by C. S. Lewis

Till We Have Faces: A Myth Retold
- First edition
- Author: C. S. Lewis
- Cover artist: Biggs
- Language: English
- Genre: Mythological novel
- Publisher: Geoffrey Bles
- Publication date: 1956
- Publication place: United Kingdom
- Media type: Print (Hardback & Paperback)
- Pages: 320 (first edition); 314 (Mass Market Paperback)

Till We Have Faces: A Myth Retold is a 1956 novel by C. S. Lewis. It is a retelling of Cupid and Psyche, based on the version in The Golden Ass by Apuleius. The myth had haunted Lewis all his life, because he believed that some of the main characters' actions were illogical. As a consequence, he chose to retell the story from the perspective of Psyche's elder sister, a highly developed character, drawing the reader into her reasoning and emotions. This was his last novel, and he considered it his most mature, written in conjunction with his wife, Joy Davidman.

The story is set in the fictional kingdom of Glome, a primitive city-state whose people have occasional contact with civilized Hellenistic Greece. The first part of the book is written from the perspective of Psyche's older sister Orual, as an accusation against the gods. In the second part of the book, the narrator undergoes a change of mindset and understands that her initial accusation was tainted by her own failings and shortcomings.

== Characters ==
=== Royalty ===
- Trom: King of Glome
- Orual: oldest daughter of Trom
  - Maia: Psyche's Greek nickname for Orual (μαῖα, Greek for "foster-mother")
- Redival: second daughter of Trom
- Istra: youngest daughter of Trom, half-sister of Orual and Redival
  - Psyche: Orual's Greek nickname for Istra
- Trunia: prince of the neighbouring country of Phars, marries Redival
- Daaran: son of Trunia and Redival, nephew and heir of Orual
- Argan: another prince of Phars, defeated by Orual.

=== Other people ===
- Batta: nurse to the sisters
- Fox (Lysias): Greek slave who acts as tutor and counsellor, a follower of Stoicism
- Poobi: faithful maid of Orual
- Alit: daughter of Poobi
- Tarin: soldier who is castrated
- Bardia: trusted soldier
- Ansit: wife of Bardia
- Ilerdia: son of Bardia
- Gram: a soldier
- Penuan: noble of Glome
- Arnom: Second Priest of Ungit

=== Gods ===
- Ungit: goddess of Glome, equivalent to Aphrodite/Venus
  - Talapal: name for Ungit in the neighboring kingdom of Essur
- God of the Grey Mountain: son of Ungit, equivalent to Eros/Cupid
  - Ialim: son of Talapal, equivalent to Eros/Cupid

== Plot summary ==
=== Part One ===
The story tells the ancient Greek myth of Cupid and Psyche, from the perspective of Orual, Psyche's older sister.

This is the complaint of Orual as an old woman, who is bitter at the injustice of the gods. To explain her accusation, she tells the story of her life. She has always been ugly, but after her mother dies and her father the King of Glome remarries, she gains a beautiful half-sister Istra, whom she loves as her own daughter, and who is known throughout the novel by the Greek version of her name, Psyche. Psyche is so beautiful that the people of Glome begin to offer sacrifices to her as to a goddess. The Priest of the goddess Ungit, a powerful figure in the kingdom, then informs the king that various plagues befalling the kingdom are a result of Ungit's jealousy, so Psyche is sent as a human sacrifice to the unseen "God of the Mountain," Ungit's son. Orual plans to rescue Psyche but falls ill and is unable to prevent anything.

When she is well again, Orual arranges to go to where Psyche was stranded on the mountain, either to rescue her or to bury what remains of her. She is stunned to find Psyche is alive, free from the shackles in which she had been bound, and furthermore says she does not need to be rescued in any way. Rather, Psyche relates that she lives in a beautiful castle that Orual cannot see, as the God of the Mountain has made her a bride rather than a victim. At one point in the narrative, Orual believes she has a brief vision of this castle, but then it vanishes like a mist. Hearing that Psyche has been commanded by her new god-husband not to look on his face (all their meetings are in the nighttime), Orual is immediately suspicious. She argues that the god must be a monster, or that Psyche has actually started to hallucinate after her abandonment and near-death on the mountain, that there is no such castle at all, and that her husband is actually an outlaw who was hiding on the mountain and takes advantage of her delusions in order to have his way with her. Orual says that because either possibility is one that she cannot abide by, she must disabuse her sister of this illusion.

She returns a second time, bringing Psyche a lamp for her to use while her "husband" sleeps, and when Psyche insists that she will not betray her husband by disobeying his command, Orual threatens both Psyche and herself, stabbing herself in the arm to show she is capable of following through on her threat. Ultimately, reluctantly, Psyche agrees because of the coercion and her love for her sister.

When Psyche disobeys her husband, she is immediately banished from her beautiful castle and forced to wander as an exile. The God of the Mountain appears to Orual, stating that Psyche must now endure hardship at the hand of a force he himself could not fight (likely his mother the goddess Ungit), and that "You too shall be Psyche," which Orual attempts to interpret for the rest of her life, usually taking it to mean that as Psyche suffers, she must suffer also. She decries the injustice of the gods, saying that if they had shown her a picture of Psyche's happiness that was easier to believe, she would not have ruined it. From this day forward she vows that she will keep her face veiled at all times.

Eventually, Orual becomes a Queen, and a warrior, diplomat, architect, reformer, politician, legislator, and judge, though all the while remaining alone. She drives herself, through work, to forget her grief and the love she has lost. Psyche is gone, her other family she never cared for, and her beloved tutor, "the Fox," has died. The man she is in love with, Bardia, the captain of the royal guard, is married and forever faithful to his wife until his death. To her, the gods remain, as ever, silent, unseen, and merciless.

While Bardia is on his deathbed, Orual decides she can no longer stand the sight of her own kingdom and decides to leave it for the first time to visit neighboring kingdoms. While resting on her journey, she leaves her group at their camp and follows sounds from within a wood, which turn out to be coming from a temple to the goddess Istra (Psyche). There Orual hears a version of Psyche's myth, which portrays her as deliberately ruining her sister's life out of envy. In response, she writes out her own story, as set forth in the book, to set the record straight. Her hope is that it will be brought to Greece, where she has heard that men are willing to question even the gods.

=== Part Two ===
Orual begins the second part of the book stating that her previous accusation that the gods are unjust is wrong. She does not have time to rewrite the whole book because she is very old and of ill health and will likely die before it can be redone, so instead she is adding on to the end.

She relates that since finishing part one of the book, she has experienced a number of dreams and visions, which at first she doubts the truth of except that they also start happening during daytime when she is fully awake. She sees herself being required to perform a number of impossible tasks, like sorting a giant mound of different seeds into separate piles, with no allowance for error, or collecting the golden wool from a flock of murderous rams, or fetching a bowl of water from a spring on a mountain which cannot be climbed and furthermore is covered with poisonous beasts. It is in the midst of this last vision that she is led to a huge chamber in the land of the dead and given the opportunity to read out her complaint in the gods' hearing. She discovers, however, that instead of reading the book she has written, she reads off a paper that appears in her hand and contains her true feelings, which are indeed much less noble than Part One of the book would suggest. Orual thinks she has been speaking only a short time, but then when stopped, realizes she has been pouring out the story of all her inner conflict and turmoil for days, repeating herself over and over and over again, as the gods sat silently. Still, rather than being jealous of Psyche, as the story she heard in the temple suggested, she reveals that she was jealous of the gods because they were allowed to enjoy Psyche's love while she herself was not.

The gods make no reply. But Orual is content, as she sees that the gods' "answer" was really to hold up the mirror of her lies to herself, and make her understand the truth of her own life and actions. Then she is led by the ghost of the Fox into a sunlit arena in which she learns the story of what Psyche has been doing: she has herself been assigned the impossible tasks from Orual's dreams, but was able to complete them with supernatural help. Orual then leaves the arena to enter another verdant field with a clear pool of water and a brilliant sky. There she meets Psyche, who has just returned from her last errand: retrieving a box of beauty from the underworld, which she then gives to Orual, though Orual is hardly conscious of this because at that moment she begins to sense that something else is happening. The God of the Mountain is coming to be with Psyche and judge Orual, but the only thing he says is "You also are Psyche" before the vision ends. The reader is led to understand that this phrase has actually been one of mercy the entire time.

Orual, awoken from the vision, dies shortly thereafter but has just enough time to record her visions and to write that she no longer hates the gods but sees that their very presence, though mysterious, is the answer she always needed.

== Conception ==
The idea of retelling the myth of Cupid and Psyche, with the palace invisible, had been in Lewis's mind ever since he was an undergraduate; the retelling, as he imagined it, involved writing through the perspective of the elder sister. He argued that this made the sister not simply envious and spiteful, but ignorant (as any mortal might be of the divine) and jealous (as anyone could be in their love). He tried it in different verse-forms when he considered himself primarily a poet, so that one could say that he'd been "at work on Orual for 35 years", even though the version told in the book "was very quickly written". In his pre-Christian days, Lewis would imagine the story with Orual "in the right and the gods in the wrong".

One of the inconsistencies of Apuleius's version was that the sisters could see the palace. For Lewis, the theme of belief is central to the story and he felt that Apuleius missed the chance to give his version of the story a true mythic quality; that is to invoke what Rudolph Otto terms in his 1923 work The Idea of the Holy the idea of the numinous which is a feeling of awe in the presence of the spiritual or holy, the supernatural. Orual does not possess the belief system that will allow her to enter into the realm of the numinous as she briefly catches sight of the palace before it vanishes. After this scene, her resolve to "protect" Psyche from the love of others is the root of her jealousy and the crux of her accusation against the injustices of the gods. Conversely, Psyche, from an early age, exhibits the openness to embrace the numinous; she feels a civic duty to heal the citizenry of Glome, she willingly accepts her role as the Accursed and the conjoined penalty of death/marriage to the Shadowbrute, the god of the Grey Mountain.

Another theme that Lewis felt Apuleius did not fully develop revolves around sacrifice. Till We Have Faces is a retelling of Apuleius's original story. Within Lewis's work there is also a retelling of the myth Orual has been telling her self represented by the segmenting of her narrative into Part 1 (the myth she tells (of) herself) and Part 2 (the retelling (to/of) herself with a new understanding of her self-awareness and outer connections to others). By the end of Part 1, Orual realizes that her love for Psyche has become perverted; it is a possessive love, unwilling to share Psyche's love with others. Bardia's widow, Ansit, points this out to Orual in a no-holds-barred confrontation after her husband's death; Orual has "consumed" the lives of her loved ones just as Ungit consumes sacrifices. This begins the dose of self-awareness that leads to Orual's "death of self" or sacrifice of her self to others, a higher, more universal power. On a societal or cultural level, the need to temper the natural loves, what Lewis would expand upon four years after TWHF in his 1960 book The Four Loves, with the subjugation of storge (affection), philia (friendship), and eros (romantic love) to that of agape (divine love) is the basis for one's ability to retain the ordered nature of those three natural loves; without the authority of agape, divine love, to govern them, the breakdown of the natural loves would ensue as a result of the back-biting nature of the three natural loves if left to their own devices. This ideology goes as far back as Homer's era and the subject of the Trojan War which was used to exemplify to Greeks the effects of disordered love on socio-cultural mores (see Helen of Troy).

=== Origin of title ===
Lewis originally titled his working manuscripts "Bareface". The editor (Gibb) rejected the title "Bareface" on the ground that readers would mistake it for a Western. In response, Lewis said he failed to see why people would be deterred from buying the book if they thought it was a Western, and that the working title was cryptic enough to be intriguing. Nevertheless, Lewis started considering an alternative title on February 29, 1956, and chose "Till We Have Faces", which refers to a line from the book where Orual says, "How can [the gods] meet us face to face till we have faces?" He defended his choice in a letter to his long-time correspondent, Dorothea Conybeare, explaining the idea that a human "must be speaking with its own voice (not one of its borrowed voices), expressing its actual desires (not what it imagines that it desires), being for good or ill itself, not any mask, veil, or persona."

== Myth and setting ==
Myths, like fairy tales, are typically set in an enigmatic location with a nebulous orientation toward time. This draws the attention of the audience to the actions of the characters which signify the importance of the choices the characters make; it forces the focus on the moralizing aspects of the characters rather than on their surroundings and it relies on archetypes to convey the anticipated actions. Lewis does something different in his approach to his retelling of the Cupid and Psyche myth from Apuleius. He makes the fictitious setting of TWHF as real, as believable, as historic as possible in order to establish the historicity of his version. He painstakingly describes the geography of the region surrounding Glome and even goes so far as to have Orual speak in terms of how far places were distanced by would-be units of measure; "[Glome] is built about as far back from the river as a woman can walk in the third of an hour...", for example.

This grounding of the story in the "historically concrete" establishes the validity to the historicity of the story which is precisely what Lewis's intentions were: to make the argument that myths are the embodiment of or basis for historical figures and their actions evolving culturally to epic proportions. He was well aware of the concept of euhemerism which the more sophisticated Greeks had developed to explain epistemologically their pantheon. Championed by Euhemerus and promulgated circa 300 B.C.E., this embryonic conception posits the notion that many of the gods were historical mortal personalities who became deified. Lewis wrote to Clyde Kilby that TWHF is "'A work of (supposed) historical imagination. A guess at what it might have been like in a little barbarous state on the borders of the Hellenistic world with Greek culture just beginning to affect it'". Doris T. Myers makes the case that it is a synthesis of both historical fiction and modern fiction, thus giving credence to the day-in-the-lifeness historicity and its intermingling with Jungian psychological archetypes of the narrative to the work.

== Reception ==
Lewis called Till We Have Faces "far and away my best book". This opinion was echoed by J. R. R. Tolkien. Robert Gorham Davis in The New York Times wrote that Lewis "still does not have all the equipment of a major novelist" but deemed it "much more convincing" than his religious novels. He praised it for being "firmly grounded in actual primitive religious practice" and wrote that the novel's "imaginative unity ... exerts ... [a] combination of awfulness, wonder and attraction".

== See also ==
- Beauty and the Beast, for a fairy tale that has been connected to the "Cupid and Psyche" myth by scholar Bruno Bettelheim (see below).
- Psyche and Eros
