= Theories about religion =

Sociological, psychological, and anthropological theories about religion generally attempt to explain the origin and function of religion. These theories define what they present as universal characteristics of religious belief and practice.

== History ==
From presocratic times, ancient authors advanced prescientific theories about religion. Herodotus (484–425 BCE) saw the gods of Greece as the same as the gods of Egypt. Euhemerus (about 330–264 BCE) regarded gods as excellent historical persons whom admirers eventually came to worship.

Scientific theories, inferred and tested by the comparative method, emerged after data from tribes and peoples all over the world became available in the 18th and 19th centuries. Max Müller (1823–1900) has the reputation of having founded the scientific study of religion; he advocated a comparative method that developed into comparative religion.

Subsequently, Clifford Geertz (1926–2006) and others questioned the validity of abstracting a general theory of all religions.

== Classification ==
Theories of religion can be classified into:

- Substantive (or essentialist) theories that focus on the contents of religions and the meaning the contents have for people. This approach asserts that people have faith because beliefs make sense insofar as they hold value and are comprehensible. The theories by Tylor and Frazer (focusing on the explanatory value of religion for its adherents), by Rudolf Otto (focusing on the importance of religious experience, more specifically experiences that are both fascinating and terrifying) and by Mircea Eliade (focusing on the longing for otherworldly perfection, the quest for meaning, and the search for patterns in mythology in various religions) offer examples of substantive theories.
- Functional theories that focus on the social or psychological functions that religion has for a group or a person. In simple terms, the functional approach sees religion as "performing certain functions for society" Theories by Karl Marx (role of religion in capitalist and pre-capitalist societies), Sigmund Freud (psychological origin of religious beliefs), Émile Durkheim (social function of religions), and the theory by Stark and Bainbridge exemplify functional theories. This approach tends to be static, with the exception of Marx' theory, and unlike e.g. Weber's approach, which treats of the interaction and dynamic processes between religions and the rest of societies.
- Social relational theories of religion that focus on the nature or social form of the beliefs and practices. Here, Charles Taylor's book The Secular Age is exemplary, as is the work of Clifford Geertz. The approach is expressed in Paul James's argument that religion is a "relatively bounded system of beliefs, symbols and practices that addresses the nature of existence through communion with others and Otherness, lived as both taking in and spiritually transcending socially grounded ontologies of time, space, embodiment and knowing". This avoids the dichotomy between the immanent and transcendental.

Other dichotomies according to which theories or descriptions of religions can be classified include:

- "insider" versus "outsider" perspectives (roughly corresponding to emic versus etic descriptions)
- individualist versus social views
- evolutionist versus relativist views

== Methodologies ==
Early essentialists, such as Tylor and Frazer, looked for similar beliefs and practices in all societies, especially the more primitive ones, more or less regardless of time and place. They relied heavily on reports made by missionaries, discoverers, and colonial civil servants. These were all investigators who had a religious background themselves, thus they looked at religion from the inside. Typically they did not practice investigative field work, but used the accidental reports of others. This method left them open to criticism for lack of universality, which many freely admitted. The theories could be updated, however, by considering new reports, which Robert Ranulph Marett (1866–1943) did for Tylor's theory of the evolution of religion.

Field workers deliberately sent out by universities and other institutions to collect specific cultural data made available a much greater database than random reports. For example, the anthropologist E. E. Evans-Pritchard (1902–1973) preferred detailed ethnographical study of tribal religion as more reliable. He criticised the work of his predecessors, Müller, Tylor, and Durkheim, as untestable speculation. He called them "armchair anthropologists".

A second methodology, functionalism, seeks explanations of religion that are outside of religion; i.e., the theorists are generally (but not necessarily) atheists or agnostics themselves. As did the essentialists, the functionalists proceeded from reports to investigative studies. Their fundamental assumptions, however, are quite different; notably, they apply methodological naturalism. When explaining religion they reject divine or supernatural explanations for the status or origins of religions because they are not scientifically testable. In fact, theorists such as Marett (an Anglican) excluded scientific results altogether, defining religion as the domain of the unpredictable and unexplainable; that is, comparative religion is the rational (and scientific) study of the irrational. The dichotomy between the two classifications is not bridgeable, even though they have the same methods, because each excludes the data of the other.

The functionalists and some of the later essentialists (among others E. E. Evans-Pritchard) have criticized the substantive view as neglecting social aspects of religion. Such critics go so far as to brand Tylor's and Frazer's views on the origin of religion as unverifiable speculation. The view of monotheism as more evolved than polytheism represents a mere preconception, they assert. There is evidence that monotheism is more prevalent in hunter societies than in agricultural societies. The view of a uniform progression in folkways is criticized as unverifiable, as the writer Andrew Lang (1844–1912) and E. E. Evans-Pritchard assert. The latter criticism presumes that the evolutionary views of the early cultural anthropologists envisaged a uniform cultural evolution. Another criticism supposes that Tylor and Frazer were individualists (unscientific). However, some support that supposed approach as worthwhile, among others the anthropologist Robin Horton. The dichotomy between the two fundamental presumptions - and the question of what data can be considered valid - continues.

== Substantive theories ==
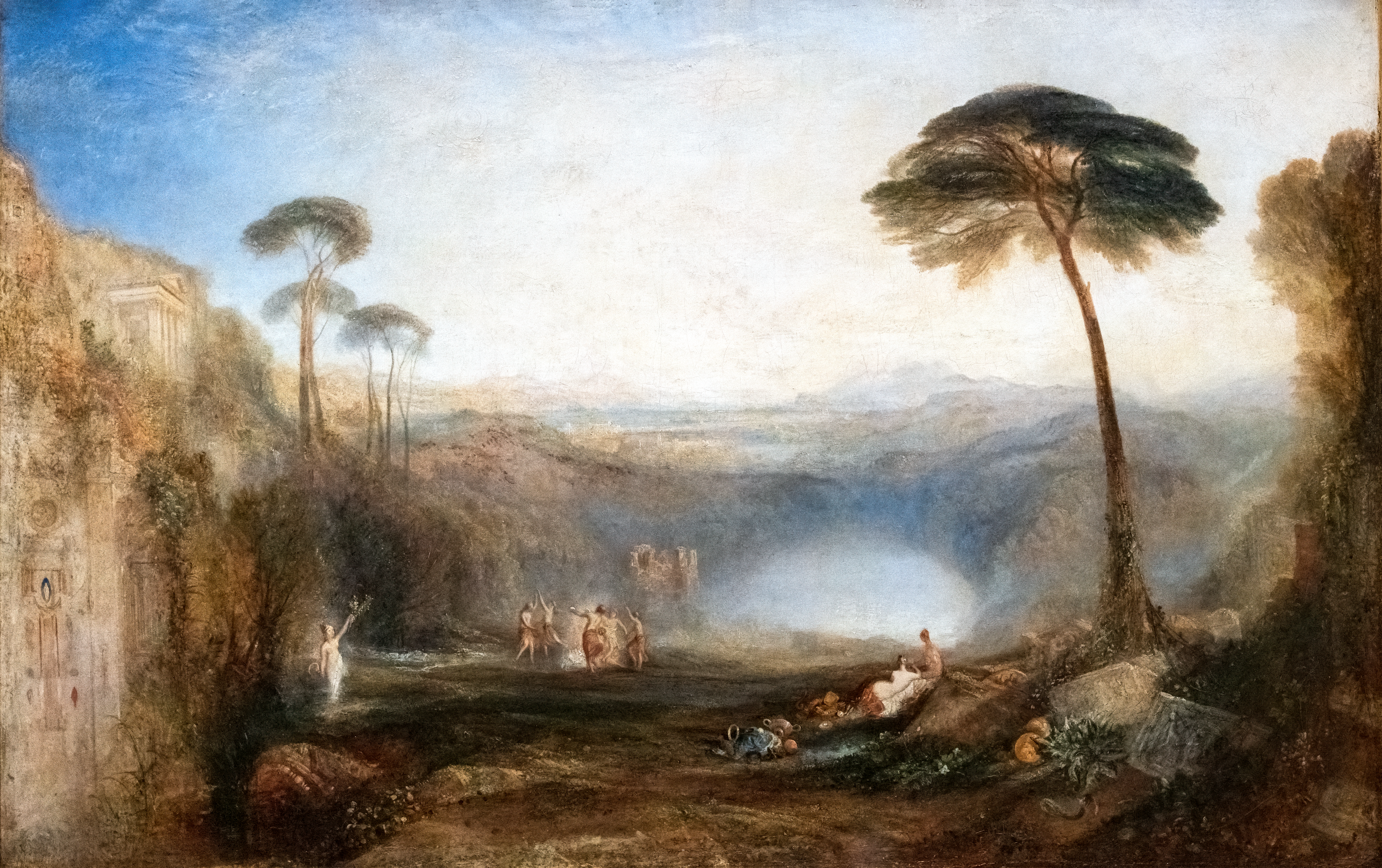
J. M. W. Turner's painting The Golden Bough, based on the Golden Bough incident in the Aeneid

=== Evolutionary theories ===
Evolutionary theories view religion as either an adaptation or a byproduct. Adaptationist theories view religion as being of adaptive value to the survival of Pleistocene humans. Byproduct theories view religion as a spandrel.

=== Edward Burnett Tylor ===
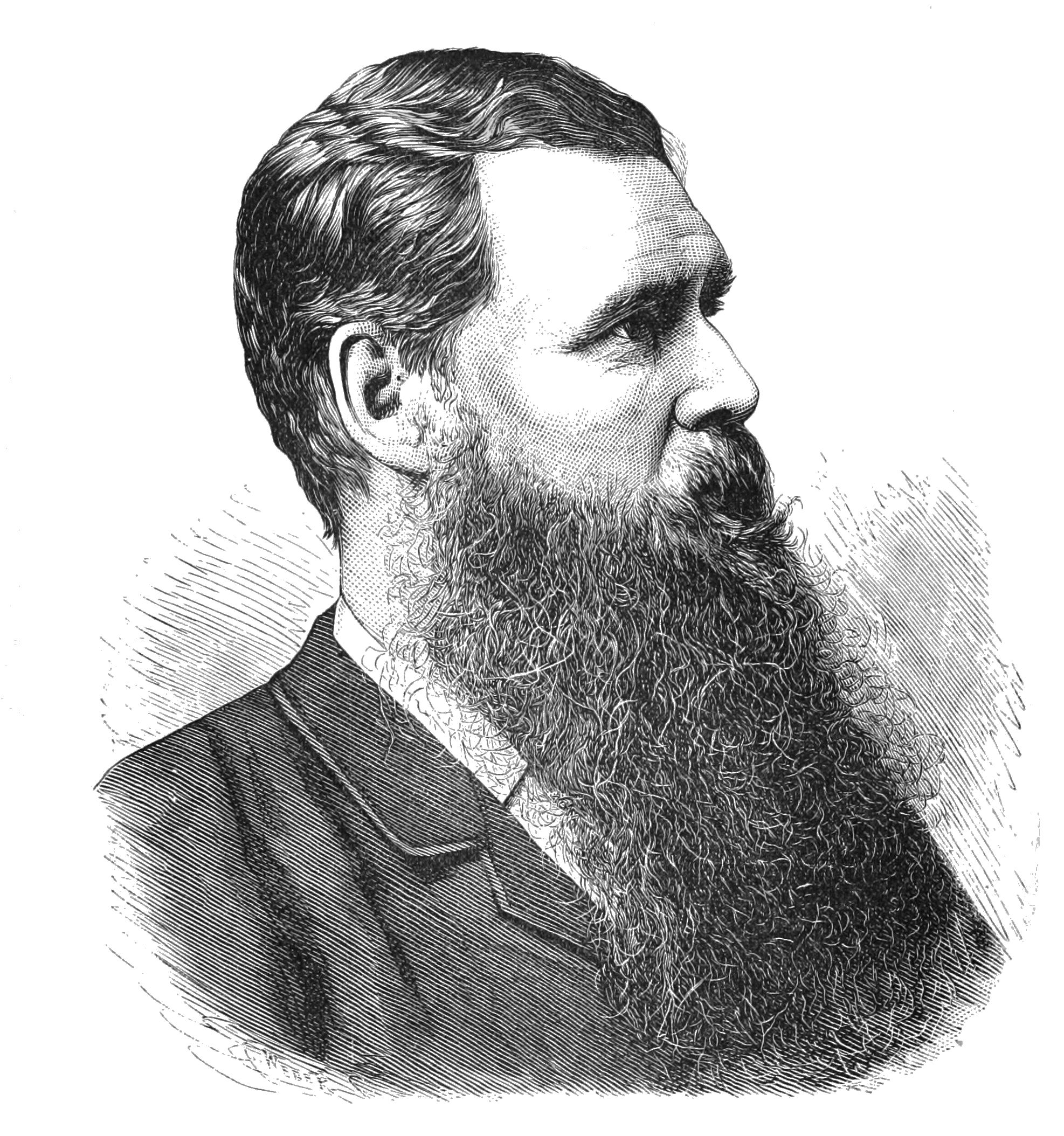
Edward Burnett Tylor

The anthropologist Edward Burnett Tylor (1832–1917) defined religion as belief in spiritual beings and stated that this belief originated as explanations of natural phenomena. Belief in spirits grew out of attempts to explain life and death. Primitive people used human dreams in which spirits seemed to appear as an indication that the human mind could exist independent of a body. They used this by extension to explain life and death, and belief in the after life. Myths and deities to explain natural phenomena originated by analogy and an extension of these explanations. His theory assumed that the psyches of all peoples of all times are more or less the same and that explanations in cultures and religions tend to grow more sophisticated via monotheist religions, such as Christianity and eventually to science. Tylor saw practices and beliefs in modern societies that were similar to those of primitive societies as survivals, but he did not explain why they survived.

=== James George Frazer ===
James George Frazer (1854–1941) followed Tylor's theories to a great extent in his book The Golden Bough, but he distinguished between magic and religion. Magic is used to influence the natural world in the primitive man's struggle for survival. He asserted that magic relied on an uncritical belief of primitive people in contact and imitation. For example, precipitation may be invoked by the primitive man by sprinkling water on the ground. He asserted that according to them magic worked through laws. In contrast religion is faith that the natural world is ruled by one or more deities with personal characteristics with whom can be pleaded, not by laws.

=== Rudolf Otto ===
The theologian Rudolf Otto (1869–1937) focused on religious experience, more specifically moments that he called numinous which means "Wholly Other". He described it as mysterium tremendum (terrifying mystery) and mysterium fascinans (awe inspiring, fascinating mystery). He saw religion as emerging from these experiences.

He asserted that these experiences arise from a special, non-rational faculty of the human mind, largely unrelated to other faculties, so religion cannot be reduced to culture or society. Some of his views, among others that the experience of the numinous was caused by a transcendental reality, are untestable and hence unscientific.

His ideas strongly influenced phenomenologists and Mircea Eliade.

=== Mircea Eliade ===
Mircea Eliade's (1907–1986) approach grew out of the phenomenology of religion. Like Otto, he saw religion as something special and autonomous, that cannot be reduced to the social, economical or psychological alone. Like Durkheim, he saw the sacred as central to religion, but differing from Durkheim, he views the sacred as often dealing with the supernatural, not with the clan or society. The daily life of an ordinary person is connected to the sacred by the appearance of the sacred, called hierophany. Theophany (an appearance of a god) is a special case of it. In The Myth of the Eternal Return Eliade wrote that archaic men wish to participate in the sacred, and that they long to return to lost paradise outside the historic time to escape meaninglessness. The primitive man could not endure that his struggle to survive had no meaning. According to Eliade, man had a nostalgia (longing) for an otherworldly perfection. Archaic man wishes to escape the terror of time and saw time as cyclic. Historical religions like Christianity and Judaism revolted against this older concept of cyclic time. They provided meaning and contact with the sacred in history through the god of Israel.

Eliade sought and found patterns in myth in various cultures, e.g. sky gods such as Zeus.

Eliade's methodology was studying comparative religion of various cultures and societies more or less regardless of other aspects of these societies, often relying on second hand reports. He also used some personal knowledge of other societies and cultures for his theories, among others his knowledge of Hindu folk religion.

He has been criticized for vagueness in defining his key concepts. Like Frazer and Tylor he has also been accused of out-of-context comparisons of religious beliefs of very different societies and cultures. He has also been accused of having a pro-religious bias (Christian and Hindu), though this bias does not seem essential for his theory.

=== E. E. Evans-Pritchard ===
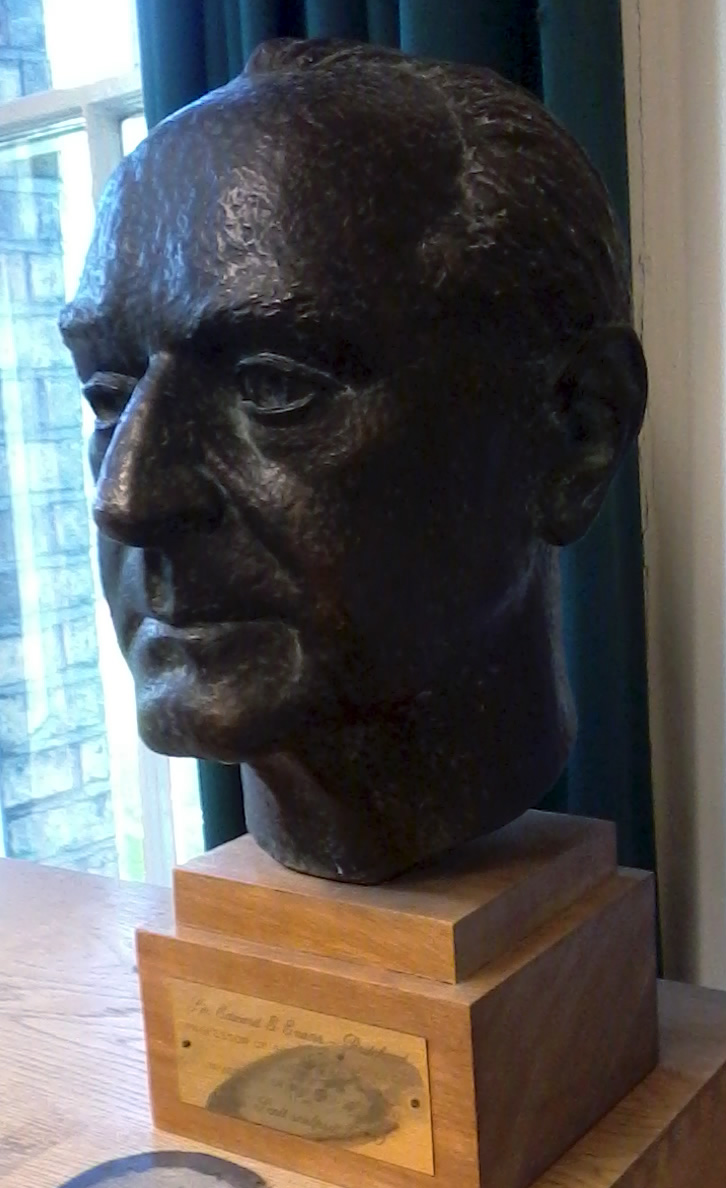
Bust of E. E. Evans-Pritchard in the Social and Cultural Anthropology Library, Oxford

The anthropologist Edward Evan Evans-Pritchard (1902–1973) did extensive ethnographic studies among the Azande and Nuer peoples who were considered "primitive" by society and earlier scholars. Evans-Pritchard saw these people as different, but not primitive.

Unlike the previous scholars, Evans-Pritchard did not propose a grand universal theory and he did extensive long-term fieldwork among "primitive" peoples, studying their culture and religion, among other among the Azande. Not just passing contact, like Eliade.

He argued that the religion of the Azande (witchcraft and oracles) can not be understood without the social context and its social function. Witchcraft and oracles played a great role in solving disputes among the Azande. In this respect he agreed with Durkheim, though he acknowledged that Frazer and Tylor were right that their religion also had an intellectual explanatory aspect. The Azande's faith in witchcraft and oracles was quite logical and consistent once some fundamental tenets were accepted. Loss of faith in the fundamental tenets could not be endured because of its social importance and hence they had an elaborate system of explanations (or excuses) against disproving evidence. Besides an alternative system of terms or school of thought did not exist.

He was heavily critical about earlier theorists of primitive religion with the exception of Lucien Lévy-Bruhl, asserting that they made statements about primitive people without having enough inside knowledge to make more than a guess. In spite of his praise of Bruhl's works, Evans-Pritchard disagreed with Bruhl's statement that a member of a "primitive" tribe saying "I am the moon" is prelogical, but that this statement makes perfect sense within their culture if understood metaphorically.

Apart from the Azande, Evans-Pritchard, also studied the neighbouring, but very different Nuer people. The Nuer had had an abstract monotheistic faith, somewhat similar to Christianity and Judaism, though it included lesser spirits. They had also totemism, but this was a minor aspect of their religion and hence a corrective to Durkheim's generalizations should be made. Evans-Pritchard did not propose a theory of religions, but only a theory of the Nuer religion.

=== Clifford Geertz ===
The anthropologist Clifford Geertz (1926–2006) made several studies in Javanese villages. He avoided the subjective and vague concept of group attitude as used by Ruth Benedict by using the analysis of society as proposed by Talcott Parsons who in turn had adapted it from Max Weber. Parsons' adaptation distinguished all human groups on three levels i.e. 1. an individual level that is controlled by 2. a social system that is in turn controlled by 3. a cultural system. Geertz followed Weber when he wrote that "man is an animal suspended in webs of significance he himself has spun and the analysis of it to be therefore not an experimental science in search of law but an interpretive one in search of meaning". Geertz held the view that mere explanations to describe religions and cultures are not sufficient: interpretations are needed too. He advocated what he called thick descriptions to interpret symbols by observing them in use, and for this work, he was known as a founder of symbolic anthropology.

Geertz saw religion as one of the cultural systems of a society. He defined religion as:

(1) a system of symbols
(2) which acts to establish powerful, pervasive and long-lasting moods and motivations in men
(3) by formulating conceptions of a general order of existence and
(4) clothing these conceptions with such an aura of factuality that
(5) the moods and motivations seem uniquely realistic.

With symbols Geertz meant a carrier that embodies a conception, because he saw religion and culture as systems of communication.

This definition emphasizes the mutual reinforcement between world view and ethos.

Though he used more or less the same methodology as Evans-Pritchard, he did not share Evans-Pritchard's hope that a theory of religion could ever be found. Geertz proposed methodology was not the scientific method of the natural science, but the method of historians studying history.

== Functional theories ==
=== Karl Marx ===
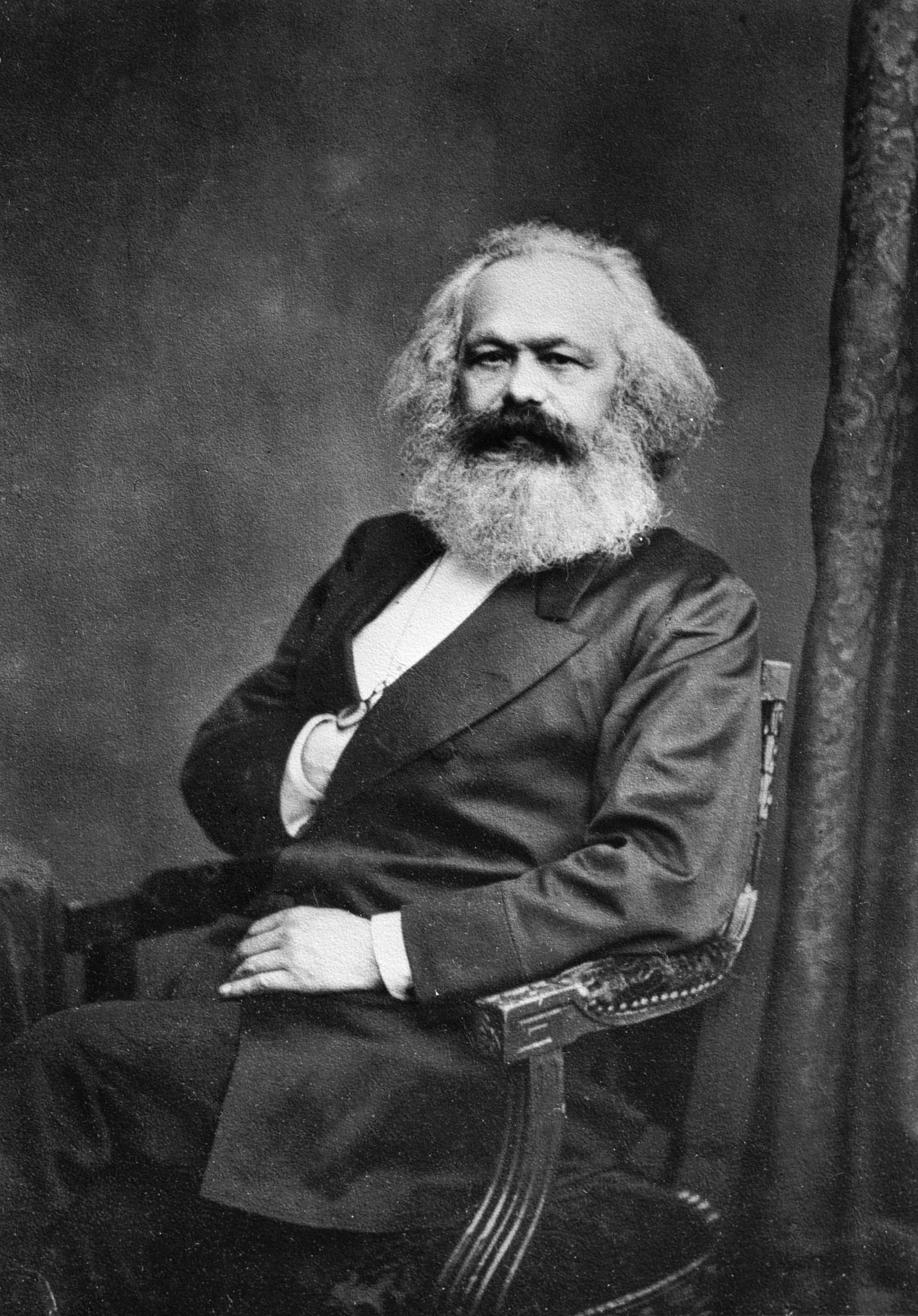
Karl Marx (1818–1883)

The social philosopher Karl Marx (1818–1883) held a materialist worldview. According to Marx, the dynamics of society were determined by the relations of production, that is, the relations that its members needed to enter into to produce their means of survival.

Developing on the ideas of Ludwig Feuerbach, he saw religion as a product of alienation that was functional to relieving people's immediate suffering, and as an ideology that masked the real nature of social relations. He deemed it a contingent part of human culture, that would have disappeared after the abolition of class society.

These claims were limited, however, to his analysis of the historical relationship between European cultures, political institutions, and their Christian religious traditions.

Marxist views strongly influenced individuals' comprehension and conclusions about society, among others the anthropological school of cultural materialism.

Marx' explanations for all religions, always, in all forms, and everywhere have never been taken seriously by many experts in the field, though a substantial fraction accept that Marx' views possibly explain some aspects of religions.

Some recent work has suggested that, while the standard account of Marx's analysis of religion is true, it is also only one side of a dialectical account, which takes seriously the disruptive, as well as the pacifying moments of religion

=== Sigmund Freud ===
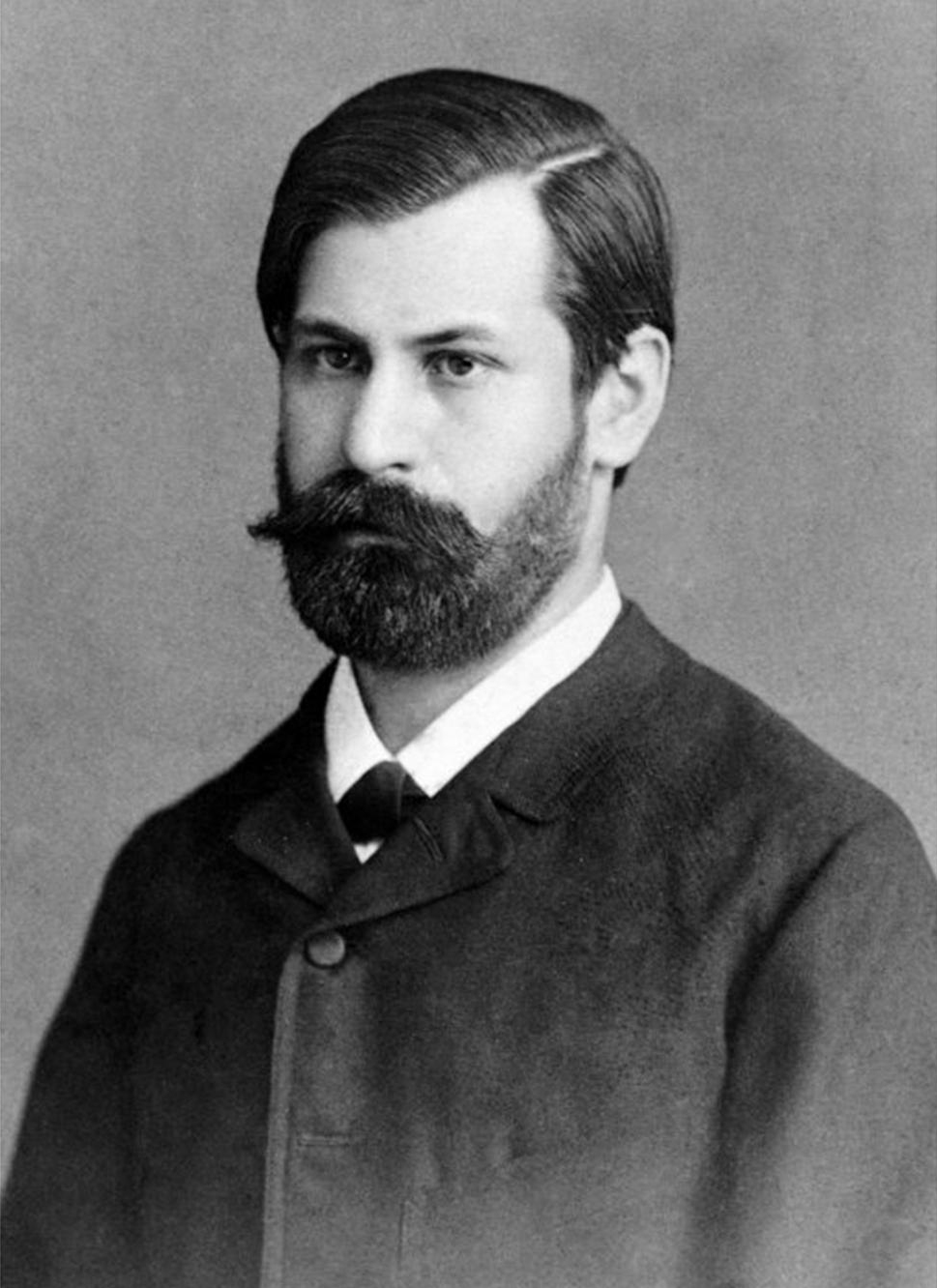
Sigmund Freud, 1885

Sigmund Freud (1856–1939) saw religion as an illusion, a belief that people very much wanted to be true. Unlike Tylor and Frazer, Freud attempted to explain why religion persists in spite of the lack of evidence for its tenets. Freud asserted that religion is a largely unconscious neurotic response to repression. By repression Freud meant that civilized society demands that we not fulfill all our desires immediately, but that they have to be repressed. Rational arguments to a person holding a religious conviction will not change the neurotic response of a person. This is in contrast to Tylor and Frazer, who saw religion as a rational and conscious, though primitive and mistaken, attempt to explain the natural world.

In his 1913 book Totem and Taboo he developed a speculative story about how all monotheist religions originated and developed. In the book he asserted that monotheistic religions grew out of a homicide in a clan of a father by his sons. This incident was subconsciously remembered in human societies.

In Moses and Monotheism, Freud proposed that Moses had been a priest of Akhenaten who fled Egypt after the pharaoh's death and perpetuated monotheism through a different religion.

Freud's view on religion was embedded in his larger theory of psychoanalysis, which has been criticized as unscientific. Although Freud's attempt to explain the historical origins of religions have not been accepted, his generalized view that all religions originate from unfulfilled psychological needs is still seen as offering a credible explanation in some cases.

=== Émile Durkheim ===
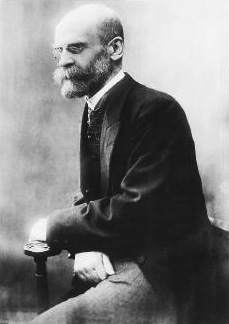
Émile Durkheim (1858–1917)

Émile Durkheim (1858–1917) saw the concept of the sacred as the defining characteristic of religion, not faith in the supernatural. He saw religion as a reflection of the concern for society. He based his view on recent research regarding totemism among the Australian aboriginals. With totemism he meant that each of the many clans had a different object, plant, or animal that they held sacred and that symbolizes the clan. Durkheim saw totemism as the original and simplest form of religion. According to Durkheim, the analysis of this simple form of religion could provide the building blocks for more complex religions. He asserted that moralism cannot be separated from religion. The sacred i.e. religion reinforces group interest that clash very often with individual interests. Durkheim held the view that the function of religion is group cohesion often performed by collectively attended rituals. He asserted that these group meetings provided a special kind of energy, which he called effervescence, that made group members lose their individuality and to feel united with the gods and thus with the group. Differing from Tylor and Frazer, he saw magic not as religious, but as an individual instrument to achieve something.

Durkheim's proposed method for progress and refinement is first to carefully study religion in its simplest form in one contemporary society and then the same in another society and compare the religions then and only between societies that are the same. The empirical basis for Durkheim's view has been severely criticized when more detailed studies of the Australian aboriginals surfaced. More specifically, the definition of religion as dealing with the sacred only, regardless of the supernatural, is not supported by studies of these aboriginals. The view that religion has a social aspect, at the very least, introduced in a generalized very strong form by Durkheim has become influential and uncontested.

Durkheim's approach gave rise to functionalist school in sociology and anthropology. Functionalism is a sociological paradigm that originally attempted to explain social institutions as collective means to fill individual biological needs, focusing on the ways in which social institutions fill social needs, especially social stability. Thus because Durkheim viewed society as an "organismic analogy of the body, wherein all the parts work together to maintain the equilibrium of the whole, religion was understood to be the glue that held society together.".

=== Bronisław Malinowski ===
The anthropologist Bronisław Malinowski (1884–1942) was strongly influenced by the functionalist school and argued that religion originated from coping with death. He saw science as practical knowledge that every society needs abundantly to survive and magic as related to this practical knowledge, but generally dealing with phenomena that humans cannot control.

=== Max Weber ===
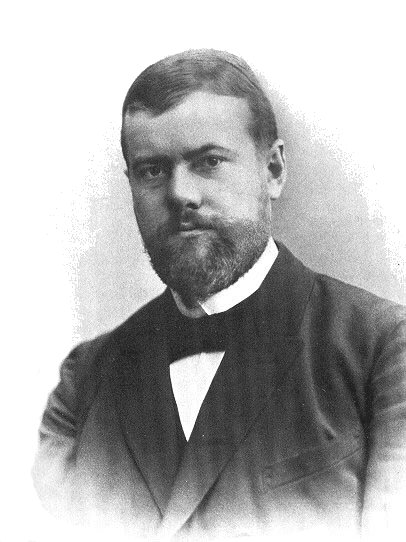
Max Weber

Max Weber (1864–1920) thought that the truth claims of religious movement were irrelevant for the scientific study of the movements. He portrayed each religion as rational and consistent in their respective societies.

Weber acknowledged that religion had a strong social component, but diverged from Durkheim by arguing, for example in his book The Protestant Ethic and the Spirit of Capitalism, that religion can be a force of change in society. In the book, Weber wrote that modern capitalism spread quickly partially due to the Protestant worldly ascetic morale. Weber's main focus was not on developing a theory of religion but on the interaction between society and religion, while introducing concepts that are still widely used in the sociology of religion. These concepts include:

- Church sect typology: Weber distinguished between sects and churches by stating that membership of a sect is a personal choice and church membership is determined by birth. The typology later developed more extensively by his friend Ernst Troeltsch and others. According to the typology, churches, ecclesia, denomination, and sects form a continuum with decreasing influence on society. Sects are protest break away groups and tend to be in tension with society.
- Ideal type: a hypothetical "pure" or "clear" form, used in typologies
- Charismatic authority: Weber saw charisma as a volatile form or authority that depends on the acceptance of unique quality of a person by this person's followers. Charisma can be a revolutionary force and the authority can either be routinized (change into other forms of authority) or disappear upon the death of the charismatic person.

Somewhat differing from Marx, Weber dealt with status groups, not with class. In status groups the primary motivation is prestige and social cohesion. Status groups have differing levels of access to power and prestige and indirectly to economic resources. In his 1920 treatment of the religion in China he saw Confucianism as helping a certain status group, i.e. the educated elite to maintain access to prestige and power. He asserted that Confucianism opposition against both extravagance and thrift made it unlikely that capitalism could have originated in China.

He used the concept of Verstehen (German for "understanding") to describe his method of interpretation of the intention and context of human action.

=== Rational choice theory ===
The rational choice theory has been applied to religions, among others by the sociologists Rodney Stark (1934–2022) and William Sims Bainbridge (born 1940). They see religions as systems of "compensators", and view human beings as "rational actors, making choices that she or he thinks best, calculating costs and benefits". Compensators are a body of language and practices that compensate for some physical lack or frustrated goal. They can be divided into specific compensators (compensators for the failure to achieve specific goals), and general compensators (compensators for failure to achieve any goal). They define religion as a system of compensation that relies on the supernatural. The main reasoning behind this theory is that the compensation is what controls the choice, or in other words the choices which the "rational actors" make are "rational in the sense that they are centered on the satisfaction of wants".

It has been observed that social or political movements that fail to achieve their goals will often transform into religions. As it becomes clear that the goals of the movement will not be achieved by natural means (at least within their lifetimes), members of the movement will look to the supernatural to achieve what cannot be achieved naturally. The new religious beliefs are compensators for the failure to achieve the original goals. Examples of this include the counterculture movement in America: the early counterculture movement was intent on changing society and removing its injustice and boredom; but as members of the movement proved unable to achieve these goals they turned to Eastern and new religions as compensators.

Most religions start out their lives as cults or sects, i.e. groups in high tension with the surrounding society, containing different views and beliefs contrary to the societal norm. Over time, they tend to either die out, or become more established, mainstream and in less tension with society. Cults are new groups with a new novel theology, while sects are attempts to return mainstream religions to (what the sect views as) their original purity. Mainstream established groups are called denominations. The comments below about cult formation apply equally well to sect formation.

There are four models of cult formation: the Psychopathological Model, the Entrepreneurial Model, the Social Model and the Normal Revelations model.

- Psychopathological model: religions are founded during a period of severe stress in the life of the founder. The founder suffers from psychological problems, which they resolve through the founding of the religion. (The development of the religion is for them a form of self-therapy, or self-medication.)
- Entrepreneurial model: founders of religions act like entrepreneurs, developing new products (religions) to sell to consumers (to convert people to). According to this model, most founders of new religions already have experience in several religious groups before they begin their own. They take ideas from the pre-existing religions, and try to improve on them to make them more popular.
- Social model: religions are founded by means of social implosions. Members of the religious group spend less and less time with people outside the group, and more and more time with each other within it. The level of affection and emotional bonding between members of a group increases, and their emotional bonds to members outside the group diminish. According to the social model, when a social implosion occurs, the group will naturally develop a new theology and rituals to accompany it.
- Normal revelations: religions are founded when the founder interprets ordinary natural phenomena as supernatural; for instance, ascribing his or her own creativity in inventing the religion to that of the deity.

Some religions are better described by one model than another, though all apply to differing degrees to all religions.

Once a cult or sect has been founded, the next problem for the founder is to convert new members to it. Prime candidates for religious conversion are those with an openness to religion, but who do not belong or fit well in any existing religious group. Those with no religion or no interest in religion are difficult to convert, especially since the cult and sect beliefs are so extreme by the standards of the surrounding society. But those already happy members of a religious group are difficult to convert as well, since they have strong social links to their preexisting religion and are unlikely to want to sever them in order to join a new one. The best candidates for religious conversion are those who are members of or have been associated with religious groups (thereby showing an interest or openness to religion), yet exist on the fringe of these groups, without strong social ties to prevent them from joining a new group.

Potential converts vary in their level of social connection. New religions best spread through pre-existing friendship networks. Converts who are marginal with few friends are easy to convert, but having few friends to convert they cannot add much to the further growth of the organization. Converts with a large social network are harder to convert, since they tend to have more invested in mainstream society; but once converted they yield many new followers through their friendship network.

Cults initially can have quite high growth rates; but as the social networks that initially feed them are exhausted, their growth rate falls quickly. On the other hand, the rate of growth is exponential (ignoring the limited supply of potential converts): the more converts you have, the more missionaries you can have out looking for new converts. But nonetheless it can take a very long time for religions to grow to a large size by natural growth. This often leads to cult leaders giving up after several decades, and withdrawing the cult from the world.

It is difficult for cults and sects to maintain their initial enthusiasm for more than about a generation. As children are born into the cult or sect, members begin to demand a more stable life. When this happens, cults tend to lose or de-emphasise many of their more radical beliefs, and become more open to the surrounding society; they then become denominations.

The theory of religious economy sees different religious organizations competing for followers in a religious economy, much like the way businesses compete for consumers in a commercial economy. Theorists assert that a true religious economy is the result of religious pluralism, giving the population a wider variety of choices in religion. According to the theory, the more religions there are, the more likely the population is to be religious and hereby contradicting the secularization thesis.

== See also ==
- Anthropology of religion – Study of religion in relation to other social institutions
- Archaeology of religion and ritual
- Definition of religion
- Elite religion – Form of a religion the leaders deem official
- Emic and etic – Two kinds of anthropologic field research
- Evolutionary origins of religion – Emergence of religious behavior discussed in terms of natural evolution
- History of religion
- Jungian interpretation of religion
- Lived religion – Religion as practiced in everyday life
- Magic and religion
- Magical thinking – Belief in the connection of unrelated events
- Philosophy of religion – Branch of philosophy
- Psychology of religion – Analytic approach to religion
- Religious studies – Objective study of religion
- Sociology of religion
- Terror management theory – Social and evolutionary psychology theory
- The Elementary Forms of the Religious Life – 1912 book by Emile Durkheim
- The Idea of the Holy – 1917 book by Rudolf Otto
- The Varieties of Religious Experience – 1902 book by William James
