= C. Jouco Bleeker =

Dutch reformed priest and religion scholar

Claas Jouco Bleeker
- Born: 1898; Beneden Knijpe, Netherlands
- Died: 1983 (aged 84–85)
- Occupations: Scholar of religion, theologian
- Employer: University of Amsterdam

Academic background
- Education: University of Leiden, University of Berlin
- Doctoral advisor: William Brede Kristensen

Academic work
- Era: 20th-century philosophy / religious studies
- Discipline: History of religions, phenomenology of religion, Egyptology
- School or tradition: Non-reductive phenomenology (influenced by Gerard van der Leeuw)
- Main interests: Ancient Egyptian religion, phenomenology of religion, concept of entelechy
- Notable works: Historia Religionum (co-editor, 1969, 1971)

Claas Jouco Bleeker (1898–1983) was a Dutch scholar of religion. Born in Beneden Knijpe, Netherlands, Bleeker received his doctorate from the University of Leiden in 1929 and was Professor of the History of Religions and the Phenomenology of Religion at the University of Amsterdam from 1946 until his retirement in 1969.

Bleeker specialised in the history of Ancient Egyptian religion and was also a leading figure in phenomenology of religion. His approach to religious studies was non-reductive, comparative, and historical. Influenced by the approach of Gerard van der Leeuw, Bleeker introduced the concept of entelechy to the phenomenology of religion, arguing that the essence of religion is realised as it unfolds through history.

== Biography ==
Bleeker was born in Beneden Knijpe (now De Knipe), Netherlands, and went to school in Leeuwarden before attending the University of Leiden to study Theology. While at Leiden, Bleeker specialised in Egyptology and the history of religions and was influenced by his tutor, William Brede Kristensen. From Leiden, he went to study at the University of Berlin, before receiving his ThD from the University of Leiden in 1929, writing his doctoral thesis on the Egyptian goddess Maat. Bleeker was a minister in the Dutch Reformed Church from 1925 to 1946. In 1946, Bleeker was appointed Professor of the History of Religions and the Phenomenology of Religion at the University of Amsterdam, where he remained until retiring in 1969. Between 1950 and 1970, Bleeker was secretary-general of the International Association for the History of Religions. A festschrift was produced in his honour in 1969, entitled Liber Amicorum.

== Work ==
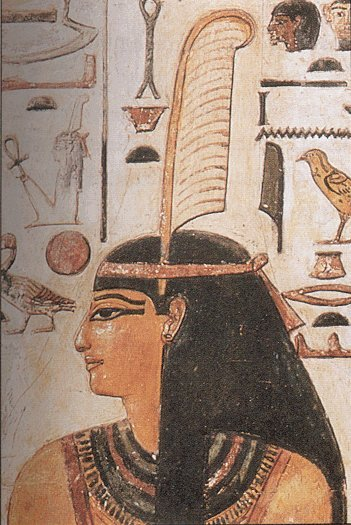
Depiction of the goddess Maat, the subject of Bleeker's doctoral thesis

Specialising in the religion of Ancient Egypt, Bleeker produced a number of studies of individual Egyptian deities—including the goddess Maat and the god Min—along with work on Egyptian religious life. His best known work in this field is the two volume Historia Religionum (1969, 1971), which he co-edited with Geo Windengren.

Bleeker was one of the foremost scholars of phenomenology of religion in the twentieth century. For Bleeker, phenomenology of religion is a decidedly non-theological task which does not by design promote religion or religious causes. Phenomenology of religion on Bleker's view, has a descriptive and interpretative task which aims to understand the experience of religion without reducing it to the methods of other disciplines such as psychology, sociology, or anthropology. The most important task of phenomenology for Bleeker is eidetic. That is, phenomenology of religion should not just be concerned with describing or categorising religious experiences but should, on the basis of the former, seek to discover the essence of human religion and its fundamental structures. Following the thought of Gerard van der Leeuw, Bleeker held that there are three key concepts for phenomenology of religion: the epoché, the eidetic vision, and intuitive insight—although he maintained that the epoché and the eidetic vision were related to the original Husserlian concepts only figuratively. The epoché is the scholar's suspension of judgement concerning the truth of religious claims, the eidetic vision is the search for the essence of religion, and intuition is the means by which the scholar recognises religion's essence in its empirical manifestations. Using these methods, Bleeker concluded that "the divine" is the key word of religion: the structure of all religion involves a relation of the human to God or the Holy, which produces specific religious rituals or practices.

For Bleeker, phenomenological inquiry comprises three main aspects: theoria, logos, and entelecheia. Theoria allows the phenomenologist to discover the essential structures within specific religious practices, while logos refers to the "strict inner laws" by which the essential structures of a religion are related to one another. While both theoria and logos built upon the ideas of previous phenomenologists (in particular, van der Leeuw), entelecheia was Bleeker's own contribution to the discipline. This incorporated the Aristotelian idea of entelechy, that a thing's essence can be realised by its manifestation. Aristotle's classic example of entelechy is an acorn, which manifests its essence through the process of becoming an oak tree. Thus, in order to determine the essence of religion, the scholar cannot just observe a religion at one moment in time but must observe how a religion has developed throughout history. Bleeker proposed that the lifecycles of individual religions could be analysed to assess their entelechy, and the entelechy of religion in general. Ancient religions—such as those of ancient Greece, Egypt, or Manichaeism—have observable lifecycles. They were born, matured, and died out, with new religions (such as Christianity or Islam) innovating while incorporating aspects of these older religions. Thus, entelecheia allows the scholar to observe the essence of religion unfolding in particular religious traditions throughout history. As the cycle unfolds through history, each iteration of religion becomes stronger and more mature; as a result, Bleeker believed that modern religion is the most complete and mature. In this way, entelecheia is not just present in specific religious traditions but in the phenomenon of human religion as a whole.
