= The Idea of the Holy =

1917 book by Rudolf Otto

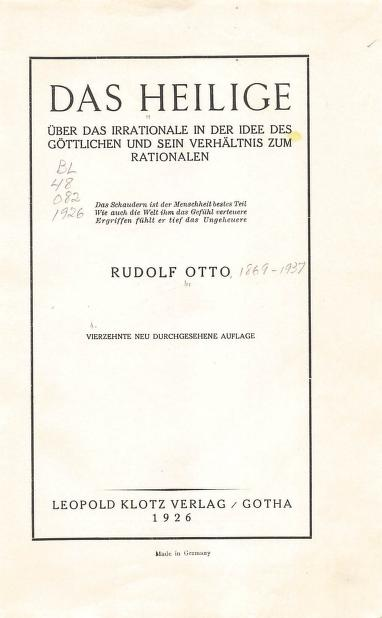
- Title page of the original German version
- Author: Rudolf Otto
- Original title: Das Heilige. Über das Irrationale in der Idee des Göttlichen und sein Verhältnis zum Rationalen
- Genre: Philosophy
- Publication date: 1917

The Idea of the Holy: An Inquiry into the Non-Rational Factor in the Idea of the Divine and its Relation to the Rational (German: Das Heilige. Über das Irrationale in der Idee des Göttlichen und sein Verhältnis zum Rationalen) is a book by the German theologian and philosopher Rudolf Otto, published in 1917. It argues that the defining element of the holy is the experience of a phenomenon which Otto calls the numinous. The book had a significant influence on religious studies in the 20th century.

== Background ==
Rudolf Otto wrote that the thought of Friedrich Schleiermacher was a major influence on his views presented in The Idea of the Holy. Other influences include Martin Luther, Albrecht Ritschl, Immanuel Kant and Jakob Friedrich Fries.

== Summary ==
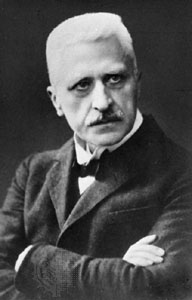
Rudolf Otto in 1925

In The Idea of the Holy, Otto writes that while the concept of "the holy" is often used to convey moral perfection, which it does entail, it contains another distinct element, beyond the ethical sphere, for which he coined the term numinous based on the Latin word numen ("divine power"). (The term is etymologically unrelated to Immanuel Kant's noumenon, a Greek term which Kant used to refer to an unknowable reality underlying sensations of the thing.) He explains the numinous as an experience or feeling which is not based on reason or sensory stimulation and represents the "wholly other" (German: ganz Andere). Otto argues that because the numinous is irreducible and sui generis it cannot be defined in terms of other concepts or experiences, and that the reader must therefore be "guided and led on by consideration and discussion of the matter through the ways of his own mind, until he reach the point at which 'the numinous' in him perforce begins to stir... In other words, our X cannot, strictly speaking, be taught, it can only be evoked, awakened in the mind." Chapters 4 to 6 are devoted to attempting to evoke the numinous and its various aspects. He writes:

The feeling of it may at times come sweeping like a gentle tide pervading the mind with a tranquil mood of deepest worship. It may pass over into a more set and lasting attitude of the soul, continuing, as it were, thrillingly vibrant and resonant, until at last it dies away and the soul resumes its “profane,” non-religious mood of everyday experience. [...] It has its crude, barbaric antecedents and early manifestations, and again it may be developed into something beautiful and pure and glorious. It may become the hushed, trembling, and speechless humility of the creature in the presence of—whom or what? In the presence of that which is a Mystery inexpressible and above all creatures.

He describes it as a mystery (Latin: mysterium) that is at once terrifying (tremendum) and fascinating (fascinans). Otto felt that the numinous was most strongly present in the Old and New Testaments, but that it was also present in all other religions.

== Reception ==
The Idea of the Holy was first published in German in 1917 and the first English translation was published in 1923. It is Otto's most famous and influential book and its conception of the holy had a significant impact on the history of religions and other disciplines of religious studies. According to the scholar Douglas Allen, the book's two major contributions were its emphasis on "an experimental approach, involving the description of the essential structures of religious experience" and an "antireductionist approach, involving the unique numinous quality of all religious experience". Prominent 20th-century scholars who have praised the book and acknowledged its influence on their work include Edmund Husserl, Karl Barth, Joachim Wach, Gerard van der Leeuw and Mircea Eliade.

== See also ==
- Phenomenology of religion
- Religious experience
- Theories about religions
