= Gustav Mensching =

German theologian (1901–1978)

- Born: 5 June 1901; Hanover, Germany
- Died: 30 September 1978 (aged 77); Düren, Germany

Academic background
- Education: University of Marburg
- Doctoral advisor: Rudolf Otto

Academic work
- Discipline: Religious studies
- Institutions: University of Riga; University of Bonn
- Main interests: Hans-Joachim Klimkeit; Karl Hoheisel; Udo Tworuschka

Gustav Mensching (6 May 1901 – 30 September 1978) was a German theologian who was Professor of Comparative Religious Studies at the University of Bonn from 1936 to 1972.

== Biography ==
Gustav Mensching was born in Hanover, Germany on 6 May 1901, the son of farmer and businessman Gustav Mensching (1869-1906) and Anna Vogler. Mensching studied philosophy, Protestant theology and religious studies at the universities of Göttingen, Marburg and Berlin. He gained his Dr. Theol. at Maburg under the supervision of Rudolf Otto.

Mensching completed his habilitation in religious history at the University of Braunschweig in 1927. The same year he married Erika Dombrowski, with whom he had two sons, the Germanist Gerhard Mensching and philosopher Günther Mensching. From 1927 to 1936, Mensching was Associate Professor of Religious Studies at the University of Riga. In 1936 he was appointed Professor of Comparative Religious Studies at the University of Bonn. Due to his membership in the National Socialist German Lecturers League, Mensching was from 1946 to 1948 prohibited from teaching. Hamid Reza Yousefi has since demonstrated was Mensching was not a supporter of Nazism. Mensching published a number of works on religion. Among his best known students were Hans-Joachim Klimkeit, Karl Hoheisel and Udo Tworuschka.

Mensching retired from the University of Bonn in 1972. He died in Düren, Germany on 30 September 1978.

== See also ==
- Otto Huth

== Selected works ==
- Das heilige Schweigen; 1926
- Die Idee der Sünde; 1931
- Zum Streit um die Deutung des buddhistischen Nirvana; 1933
- Zur Metaphysik des Ich; 1934
- Der Katholizismus – Sein Stirb und Werde; Herausgeber; 1937
- Das heilige Wort; 1937
- Volksreligion und Weltreligion;1938
- Vergleichende Religionswissenschaft; 1938
- Allgemeine Religionsgeschichte; 1940, 1949^{2}
- Der Schicksalsgedanke in der Religionsgeschichte. Bonn 1942. 15 S. (Antrittsvorlesungen als Kriegsvorträge der Rheinischen Friedrich-Wilhelms-Universität Bonn; Heft 12)
- Soziologie der Religion; 1947
- Geschichte der Religionswissenschaft; 1948
- Die Religionen und die Welt; 1947
- Gut und Böse im Glauben der Völker; 1950^{2}
- Buddhistische Geisteswelt; 1955
- Toleranz und Wahrheit in der Religion; 1955; Neuausgabe, hg. von Udo Tworuschka 1996
- Leben und Legende der Religionsstifter; 1955
- Religiöse Ursymbole der Menschheit; 1955
- Die Söhne Gottes; 1958
- Die Religion. Erscheinungsformen, Strukturtypen und Lebensgesetze; 1959
- Idee und Aufgabe der Weltuniversität; 1962
- Soziologie der großen Religionen; 1966
- Topos und Typos. Motive und Strukturen religiösen Lebens; hg. von Hans Joachim Klimkeit, 1971
- Die Weltreligionen; 1972
- Der offene Tempel. Die Weltreligionen im Gespräch miteinander; Stuttgart 1974
- Buddha und Christus; 1978; Neuausgabe als Herder TB 2004
- Aufsätze und Vorträge Gustav Menschings zur Toleranz- und Wahrheitskonzeption; Bausteine zur Mensching-Forschung 2; hrsg. v. Hamid Reza Yousefi; Würzburg 2002
- Der Irrtum in der Religion (Stuttgart 1969). Neu hrsg. mit dem neuen Untertitel: Eine Einführung in die Phänomenologie des Irrtums; hrsg. von Hamid Reza Yousefi und Klaus Fischer; Nordhausen 2003

== Sources ==
- Udo Tworuschka: Religionsbewertung als Problem und Aufgabe. Die Haltung Gustav Menschings zur Religionsmessung. In: Zeitschrift für Religions- und Geistesgeschichte. 27, 1975, ISSN 0044-3441, S. 122–140.
- Wolfgang Gantke, Peter Parusel (1994). "Mensching, Gustav". Neue Deutsche Biographie (in German). Vol. 17. Berlin: Duncker & Humblot. pp. 86–87. (full text online).
- Wolfgang Gantke, Karl Hoheisel, Wilhelm P. Schneemelcher (Hrsg.): Religionswissenschaft im historischen Kontext. diagonal, Marburg 2003, ISBN 978-3-927165-85-4 (= Religionswissenschaftliche Reihe. Band 21).
- Hamid Reza Yousefi, Ina Braun: Gustav Mensching – Leben und Werk. Ein Forschungsbericht zur Toleranzkonzeption, Gewidmet Gustav Mensching anlässlich seines 100. Geburtstages. Königshausen und Neumann, Würzburg 2002, ISBN 3-8260-2233-5 (= Bausteine zur Mensching-Forschung. Band 1).
- Hamid Reza Yousefi, Ina Braun (2003). "MENSCHING, Gustav Hermann Heinrich Friedrich". In Bautz, Traugott (ed.). Biographisch-Bibliographisches Kirchenlexikon (BBKL) (in German). Vol. 21. Nordhausen: Bautz. cols. 976–1007. ISBN 3-88309-110-3.
- Hamid Reza Yousefi: Der Toleranzbegriff im Denken Gustav Menschings. Eine interkulturelle philosophische Orientierung. Bautz, Nordhausen 2004, ISBN 978-3-88309-146-4 (= Bausteine zur Mensching-Forschung. Band 7).
- Hamid Reza Yousefi: Angewandte Toleranz. Gustav Mensching interkulturell gelesen. Bautz, Nordhausen 2008, ISBN 978-3-88309-447-2 (= Interkulturelle Bibliothek. Band 49).
- Nikandrs Gills: Gustav Mensching and University of Latvia. In: The European connection. Baltic intellectuals and the history of Western philosophy and theology, Riga 2006, S. 44–57
- Christian Grethlein: Gustav Mensching (1901–1978). In: Benedikt Kranemann/Klaus Raschzok (Hrsg.): Gottesdienst als Feld theologischer Wissenschaft im 20. Jahrhundert, Münster 2001, Bd. 2, S. 722–731
- Udo Tworuschka: Religionswissenschaft. Wegbereiter und Klassiker, Böhlau, Köln, Weimar, Wien 2011, S. 214–237.
- Udo Tworuschka: Einführung in die Geschichte der Religionswissenschaft, WBG, Darmstadt 2014
