= Robert Havard =

British doctor (1901–1985)

- Born: March 15, 1901
- Died: 27 July 1985 (aged 83–84)
- Scientific career
- Fields: Medicine

Robert Emlyn Havard (March 15, 1901 – July 27, 1985) was the physician of C. S. Lewis, his wife Joy Davidman, and J.R.R. Tolkien.

== Biography ==
Havard was born in South Kyme, Lincolnshire. He studied chemistry at Oxford, and medicine at Cambridge and Guy’s Hospital in London. He held a number of research posts and co-authored over twenty scientific publications before becoming a General Practitioner in Oxford, where he met Lewis in 1934. He converted to Roman Catholicism in 1931.

In 1943, Havard was called up for service and worked as a medical officer in the Royal Navy; he then continued his GP work until 1968, when he retired and moved to the Isle of Wight.

He was married to Grace Mary Middleton and they had five children. Their family home, of which the ground floor was also his doctors surgery and waiting room, was at 28 Sandfield Road, in Headington.

== Interactions with other writers ==
In addition to his medical research papers, Havard authored an appendix for C. S. Lewis's The Problem of Pain. He also authored a description of Lewis included in Remembering C. S. Lewis: Recollections of Those Who Knew Him and one of J. R. R. Tolkien included in Mythlore.

Havard was a member of the Oxford-based Inklings. Lewis invited him to join because of the literary interests he shared with that group. Havard was sometimes referred to by the Inklings as the "Useless Quack," mainly because Warren Lewis once called him so upon being irritated by his tardiness, and his brother, Jack, thought it quite amusing at the time and caused the nickname to continue. The abbreviation "U.Q." was thereafter a common reference to Havard.

Lewis dedicated his novel, Prince Caspian, to Havard’s daughter Mary.

Hugo Dyson once called him "Humphrey" when he could not remember his name. After that, Havard was quite frequently known as "Dr. Humphrey Havard," to the extent that when Douglas Gresham came to know him years later and became his patient, it was some time before he discovered Robert Havard's actual name was not really Humphrey.
