= Phenomenology of religion =

Study of experiential aspects of religion

The phenomenology of religion concerns the experiential aspect of religion, describing religious phenomena in terms consistent with the orientation of worshippers. It views religion as made up of different components, and studies these components across religious traditions in order to gain some understanding of them.

A different approach is that of typological or classifying phenomenology, which seeks to describe and explain religion in general by analyzing the many diverse 'phenomena' of religions, such as rituals, holy places, narratives, religious roles, and the many other modes of religious expression. In this respect, the phenomenology of religion takes the generalizing role that linguistics has over philologies or that anthropology has in relation the specific ethnographies: where the history of religions produces insights into specific religious traditions, the phenomenology of religion becomes the general scholarly (or scientific) enterprise that explains and interprets religious phenomena in general.

Although it has adopted some of the philosophical terminology of the phenomenological movement founded by Edmund Husserl, the tradition of the phenomenology of religion discussed in this article is only loosely related to the philosophical movement known as phenomenology.

== Chantepie de la Saussaye ==
The first explicit use of the phrase "phenomenology of religion" occurs in the Lehrbuch der Religionsgeschichte (Handbook of the History of Religions), written by Pierre Daniël Chantepie de la Saussaye in 1887, wherein he articulates the task of the science of religion and gives an "Outline of the phenomenology of religion". Employing the terminology of Georg Wilhelm Friedrich Hegel, Chantepie divides his science of religion into two areas of investigation, essence and manifestations, which are approached through investigations in philosophy and history, respectively. However, Chantepie's phenomenology "belongs neither to the history nor the philosophy of religion as Hegel envisioned them". For Chantepie, it is the task of phenomenology to prepare historical data for philosophical analysis through "a collection, a grouping, an arrangement, and a classifying of the principal groups of religious conceptions". This sense of phenomenology as a grouping of manifestations is similar to the conception of phenomenology articulated by Robison and the British; however, insofar as Chantepie conceives of phenomenology as a preparation for the philosophical elucidation of essences, his phenomenology is not completely opposed to that of Hegel.

== Kristensen ==
Chantepie's Lehrbuch was highly influential, and many researchers began similar efforts after its publication and its subsequent translation into English and French. One such researcher was William Brede Kristensen. In 1901, Kristensen was appointed the first professorship relating to the phenomenology of religion at the University of Leiden. Some of the material from Kristensen's lectures on the phenomenology of religion was edited posthumously, and the English translation was published in 1960 as The Meaning of Religion. James notes that Kristensen's phenomenology "adopts many of the features of Chantepie’s grouping of religious phenomena," and penetrates further into the intricacies of Chantepie's phenomenological approach.

For Chantepie, phenomenology is affected by the philosophy and history of religion, but for Kristensen, it is also the medium whereby the philosophy and history of religion interact with and affect one another. In this sense, Kristensen's account of the relationship between historical manifestations and philosophy is more similar to that of Hegel than it is to Chantepie. In defining the religious essence of which he explores historical manifestations, Kristensen appropriates Rudolf Otto’s conception of das Heilige ("the holy" or "the sacred"). Otto describes das Heilige with the expression mysterium tremendum et fascinans—a numinous power revealed in a moment of "awe" that admits of both the horrible shuddering of "religious dread" (tremendum) and fascinating wonder (fascinans) with the overpowering majesty (majestas) of the ineffable, "wholly other" mystery (mysterium).

Like Chantepie, Kristensen argues that phenomenology seeks the “meaning” of religious phenomena. Kristensen clarifies this supposition by defining the meaning that his phenomenology is seeking as “the meaning that the religious phenomena have for the believers themselves”. Furthermore, Kristensen argues that phenomenology is not complete in grouping or classifying the phenomena according to their meaning, but in the act of understanding. “Phenomenology has as its objects to come as far as possible into contact with and to understand the extremely varied and divergent religious data”.

Being a phenomenologist, Kristensen was less interested in philosophical presuppositions than in his concrete depth-research in the incidental religious phenomena. These subjects concerned mythological material (such as Creation, the Flood etc.) as well as human action (such as baptism, Olympic Games etc.), and objects of nature and handicrafts. In all of this he only made use of the authentic sources: writings and images by the believers themselves. This procedure compelled him to reduce the field of his research - he had to profoundly master all relating languages and writings in order to be able to understand his sources in a way as they would have wanted to be understood themselves. Consequently, he reduced his field of research to the phenomena in religions living around the origin of Christianity: during the millennia before and the centuries after Christ, in Iran (Avesta), Babylonia and Assyria, Israel, Egypt, Greece and Rome. The required knowledge of speeches, also, is one of the causes that only few (Van der Leeuw, Bleeker) of his pupils did carry on in his line, although many scholars showed interest in the results of his research. Apart from his synopsis The Meaning of Religion, and a just simple Introduction in History of Religion, his publications are mostly restricted to the results of his incidental partial researches, published in the shape of a Communication of the Royal Academy of the Netherlands.

== van der Leeuw ==
The phenomenological approach to religion developed in Gerardus van der Leeuw’s Phänomenologie der Religion (1933) follows Kristensen in many respects, while also appropriating the phenomenology of Martin Heidegger and the hermeneutics of Wilhelm Dilthey.

For van der Leeuw, understanding is the subjective aspect of phenomena, which is inherently intertwined with the objectivity of that which is manifest. Van der Leeuw articulates the relation of understanding to understood phenomena according to the schema outlined in Dilthey’s definition of the human sciences (Geisteswissenschaften) as sciences that are “based on the relations between experience, expression and understanding” (“Verhältnis von Erlebnis, Ausdruck, und Verstehen”). Van der Leeuw correlates subjective experience, expression, and understanding with three objective levels of appearing—relative concealment (Verborgenheit), relative transparency (Durchsichtigkeit), and gradually becoming manifest or revealed (Offenbarwerden), wherein the understanding of what is becoming revealed is the primordial level of appearing from which the experienced concealment and expressed transparency of appearing are derived.

Because van der Leeuw, like Kristensen, appropriates Otto's concept of das Heilige in defining the essential category of religion, the transcendence becoming revealed in all human understanding can be further described as sacred — an overpowering “wholly other,” which becomes revealed in astonishing moments of dreadful awe (Scheu) and wonderful fascination. Van der Leeuw argues that this concept of religious dread is also present in Kierkegaard's work on Angst and in Heidegger's statement that “what arouses dread is ‘being in the world’ itself”. Moreover, van der Leeuw recognizes that, although dreadful, Being-in-the-world is fundamentally characterized as care (Sorge), the existential structure whereby Dasein is concerned with meaningful relationships in the world alongside other beings.

Because all experiences disclose concealed (wholly other) transcendence to the understanding, all experiences of Being-in-the-world are ultimately religious experiences of the sacred, whether explicitly recognized as such or not. Human being as such is homo religiosus, the opposite of homo negligens.

It is the task of the phenomenology of religion to interpret the various ways in which the sacred appears to human beings in the world, the ways in which humans understand and care for that which is revealed to them, for that which is ultimately wholly other mystery. Among other great phenomenologists who worked and influenced phenomenology of religion are Henry Corbin, Ninian Smart, Mircea Eliade, and C. Jouco Bleeker.

== See also ==
- Postmodern Christianity
- Sacred-profane dichotomy

== Bibliography ==
- Mircea Eliade. 1987. The Sacred and the Profane: The Nature of Religion, translated by Willard R. Trask. San Diego: Harcourt Brace Jovanovich, Inc.
- George James. 1995. Interpreting Religion: The Phenomenological Approaches of Pierre Daniël Chantepie de la Saussaye, W. Brede Kristensen, and Gerardus van der Leeuw. Washington: Catholic University of America Press.
- G.W.F. Hegel. 1968. Lectures on the Philosophy of Religion: Together with a Work on the Proofs of the Existence of God, translated by Rev. E. B. Speirs, B. D. and J. Burdon Sanderson. 3 volumes. New York: Humanities Press, Inc.
- Martin Heidegger. 1962. Being and Time, translated by John MacQuarrie and Edward Robinson. New York: Harper and Row.
- Martin Heidegger. 2004. Phenomenology of the Religious Life, translated by Matthias Fritsch and Jennifer Anna Gosetti-Ferencei. Bloomington: Indiana University Press.
- Edmund Husserl. 1970. The Crisis of European Sciences and Transcendental Phenomenology: An Introduction to Phenomenological Philosophy, translated by David Carr. Evanston: Northwestern University Press.
- Immanuel Kant. 1960. Religion within the Limits of Reason Alone, translated by Theodore M. Greene and Hoyt H. Hudson. New York: Harper and Brothers.
- Søren Kierkegaard. 1980. The Concept of Anxiety, edited and translated by Reidar Thomte. Princeton: Princeton University Press.
- Mario Kopić. 2010. Sekstant. Belgrade: Službeni glasnik.
- W. Brede Kristensen. 1971. The Meaning of Religion: Lectures in the Phenomenology of Religion, translated by John B. Carman. The Haugue: Martinus Nijhoff.
- Rudolf Otto. Das Heilige. Über das Irrationale in der Idee des Göttlichen und sein Verhältnis zum Rationalen., Breslau, 1917. >> The Idea of the Holy, translated by John W. Harvey. London: Oxford University Press. 1958.
- Ninian Smart. 1973. The Phenomenon of Religion. New York: The Seabury Press.
- Gerardus Van der Leeuw. 1956. Phänomenologie der Religion. 2nd edition. Tübingen: J. C. B. Mohr.
- Gerardus Van der Leeuw. 1963. Religion in Essence and Manifestation: A Study in Phenomenology, translated by J. E. Turner. 2 volumes. New York: Harper & Row.
- Jacques Waardenburg. 1978. Reflections on the Study of Religion: Including an Essay on the Work of Gerardus van der Leeuw. The Hague: Mouton Publishers.
