= William Brede Kristensen =

Norwegian-born Dutch theologian, professor and historian of religion

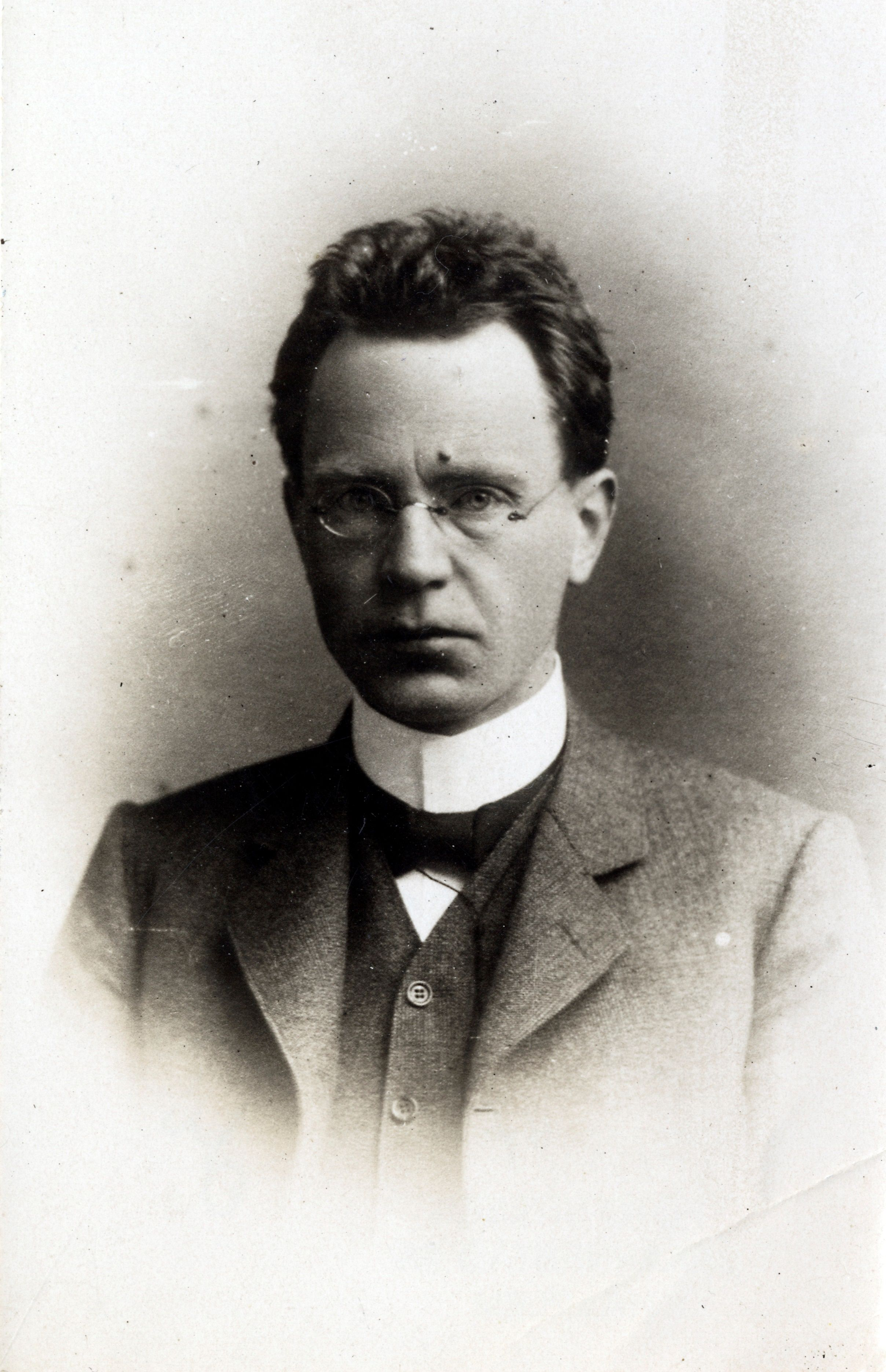
William Brede Kristensen (1914)

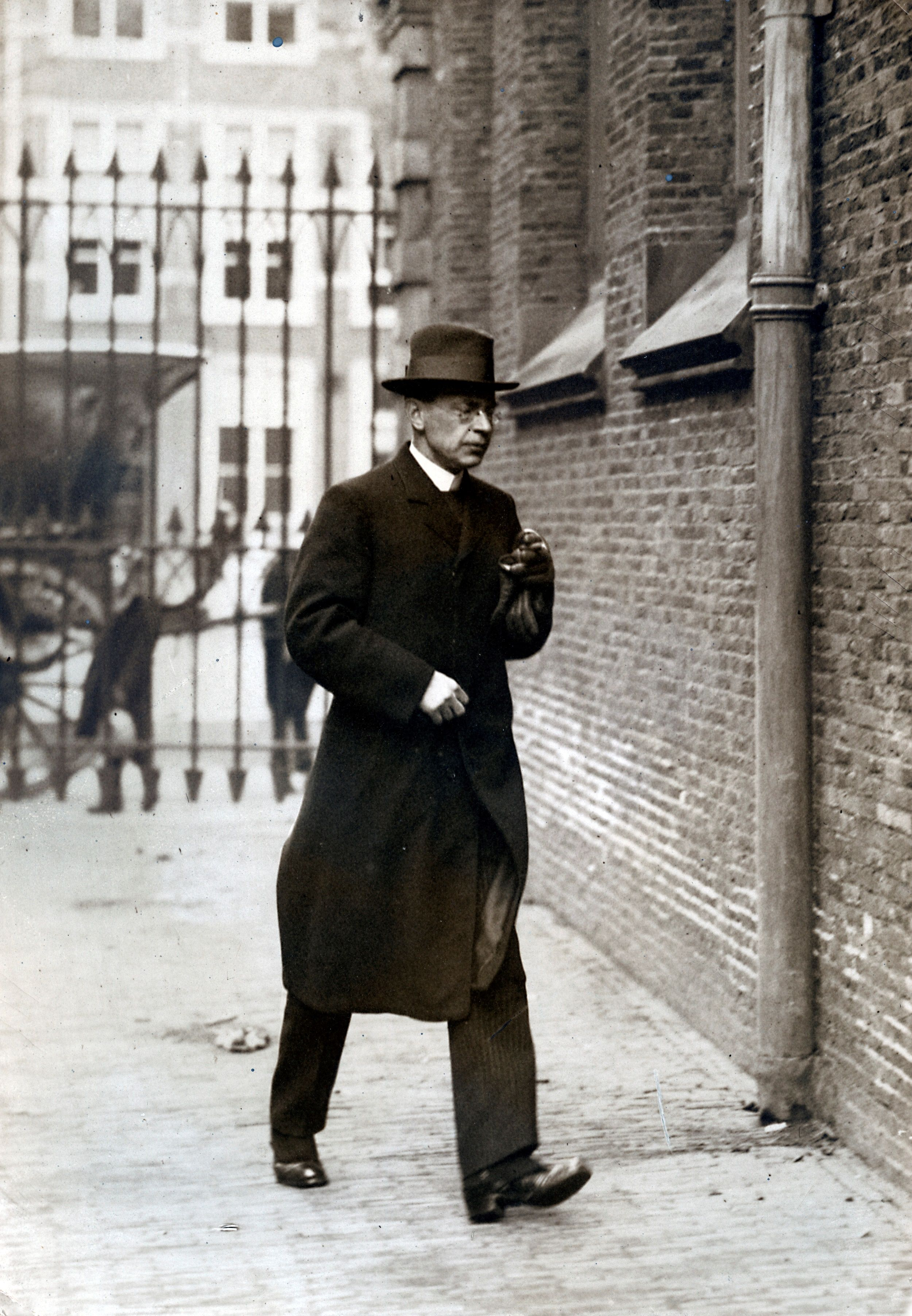
William Brede Kristensen (1917)

William Brede Kristensen (21 June 1867 – 25 September 1953) was a Norwegian born, Dutch theologian, professor and historian of religion.

== Biography ==
William Brede Kristensen was born at Kristiansand in Vest-Agder, Norway. He was the son of parish priest Kristian Nicolai Kristensen (1838–1916) and Caroline Emilie Bjørnson (1841–1929). His mother was a sister of Nobel Prize winning author Bjørnstjerne Bjørnson (1832–1910).

Kristensen completed secondary school (examen artium 1884). For a short while he studied theology, but from the fall of 1887 he concentrated on history of religion, first at the University of Kristiania, later (1890–92) at Leiden University under Professor Cornelis Petrus Tiele and 1892–93 in Paris under Gaston Maspero. In 1896 he received his Doctor Philosophiae from the University of Kristiania on a thesis titled The Egyptians' Conceptions of Life after Death in Relation to the Gods Ra and Osiris (Ægypternes Forestillinger om Liv efter Døden i Forbindelse med Guderne Ra og Osiris).

Kristensen was granted a scholarship, combined with the duty of giving lectures at University of Kristiania in 1898. In 1901 he became the successor of Professor Tiele in history of religion and Phenomenology of religion at Leiden University, a professorship he held until his retirement in 1937. He died during 1953 at Leiden, Nederland.

Kristensen can be seen as the anchorman of Dutch Phenomenology of religion. Kristensen argues that phenomenology seeks the “meaning” of religious phenomena. Kristensen clarifies this supposition by defining the meaning that his phenomenology is seeking as “the meaning that the religious phenomena have for the believers themselves”.

Kristensen was a member of the Science Society in Kristiania (now Norwegian Academy of Science and Letters) from 1898 and of the Royal Netherlands Academy of Arts and Sciences from 1911. He became an honorary doctor at the University of Groningen in 1914 and a knight of the Order of the Netherlands Lion in 1929.
