= Jacques Forget =

Belgian priest and scholar (1852–1933)

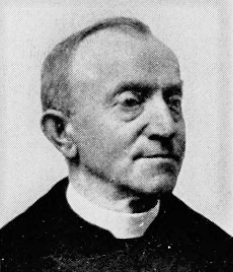
- Born: 6 January 1852; Chiny, Belgium
- Died: 1933 (aged 80–81); Louvain, Belgium
- Occupations: Clergyman, educator

The abbé Jacques Forget (6 January 1852 – 1933) was a Belgian priest, biblical scholar and professor of Arabic at the Catholic University of Louvain.

== Life ==
Jacques Forget was born 6 January 1852 in Chiny, Belgium. He was educated at the seminaries of Bastogne and Namur. He studied Semitic languages in Rome, Beirut, Syria, and the University of Berlin. Forget was ordained in 1876.

In 1885, Forget became a professor at the University of Leuven, teaching Arabic language and literature; the following year, he added dogmatic theology and Syriac. He founded the African Society, for missionaries to the Congo. He was an honorary canon of the cathedral of Namur; and wrote several articles for the Catholic Encyclopedia.

In 1895, he participated in the international Congress of Catholic Scholars in Brussels. In 1905, he attended the International Congress of Orientalists in Algiers. He also took part in the International Congress of Apologetics in 1910 in Vich, Switzerland.

== See also ==
- Catholic Church in Belgium
