= Psyche and Eros =

2023 novel by Luna McNamara

- Author: Luna McNamara
- Genre: Romance
- Publication date: 2023

Psyche and Eros is a 2023 fantasy romance novel by Luna McNamara. It is based upon Greek mythology, inspired by the myth of Cupid and Psyche and the events of the Trojan War.

== Plot ==
When Psyche, princess of Mycenae is born, the oracle prophesies that she will conquer a monster feared by the gods. Psyche's father asks the hero Atalanta to train Psyche as a warrior so that she will be prepared to fight the monster. She later decides to go into exile on a mountainside to prevent the monster from destroying her home.

After the goddess Aphrodite becomes offended by Psyche's beauty and disinterest in love, she sends her son Eros to curse Psyche with an enchanted arrow. Eros accidentally cuts himself on one of his arrows and is cursed to fall in love with Psyche. The curse also makes it so that they may never look at each other, or they will be separated forever.

== Deviations from myth ==
The novel deviates from the original myth of Cupid and Psyche in Greek mythology. In the original story, the prophesy says that Psyche will one day marry a monster and must be exiled to a mountainside. While there, she learns that she is married to Cupid, also known as Eros, who has been cursed by his own arrows. The novel is set during the same period as the Trojan War and features characters from it, while the original myth is unconnected to the Trojan War.

== Reception ==
In Locus, Alexandra Pierce wrote that "McNamara takes ancient mythology and, making judicious alterations, creates something that is recognisable yet new and, yes, more modern."

Katharine Riordan of the Historical Novel Society gave it a mixed review, writing that "the prose is nowhere near the literary quality of other retellings, nor does it really sit firmly into the romance model. It reads more YA than its suggested target market: a funny and frothy romp".

Angie Raney, in the Chicago Review of Books, wrote that "McNamara's prose is vivid and luscious, with narratives delicately woven like traditional myths. Immensely humorous, unyielding in its feminism, and at times relatably messy".

Natalie Xenos of Culturefly praised it as "an absorbing story with an endearing central duo and a sprawling cast of well-known side characters."
