= The Problem of Pain =

1940 book by C. S. Lewis

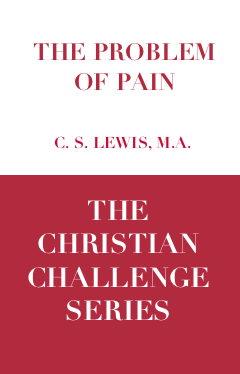
- First edition
- Author: C. S. Lewis
- Language: English
- Published: 1940
- Publisher: The Centenary Press
- Publication place: United Kingdom
- Media type: print
- Pages: 148
- ISBN: 9780060652968
- Current edition published by HarperCollins

The Problem of Pain is a 1940 book on the problem of evil by C. S. Lewis, in which Lewis argues that human pain, animal pain, and hell are not sufficient reasons to reject belief in a good and powerful God.

Lewis states that his writing is "not primarily arguing the truth of Christianity but describing its origin – a task ... necessary if we are to put the problem of pain in its right setting". He begins by addressing the flaws in common arguments against the belief in a just, loving, and all-powerful God such as: "If God were good, He would make His creatures perfectly happy, and if He were almighty He would be able to do what he wished. But the creatures are not happy. Therefore God lacks either goodness, or power, or both." Topics include human suffering and sinfulness, animal suffering, and the problem of hell, and seeks to reconcile these with an omnipotent force beyond ourselves.

== Summary ==
=== Introduction ===
Lewis starts with his former atheistic stance and paints in broad strokes the "problem of pain". He asks how, if the world is so bad, did humans ever attribute it to a benevolent deity? He then describes three attributes that all developed religions have and a fourth attribute peculiar to Christianity.

1. An experience with the Numinous (a sort of awe, dread, and a general sense of experiencing something otherworldly "uncanny").
2. An acknowledgement of morality.
3. The Numinous as guardian of the morality.
4. Actual historical events.

=== Divine Omnipotence ===
Lewis states the problem of pain again in a simpler way: "If God were good, He would wish to make His creatures perfectly happy, and if God were almighty, He would be able to do what he wished. But the creatures are not happy. Therefore, God lacks either goodness, or power, or both." Lewis says that if the popular meanings attached to the words are the best or only possible then the problem is unanswerable. The possibility of answering it depends on understanding the words 'good,' 'almighty,' and 'happy' in a bigger sense.

He discusses the nature of "impossible" with the conclusion that anything self-contradictory is not under the auspice of God’s omnipotence because it would be a non-entity; anything is possible with God.

Lewis then talks about the nature of nature/matter. Because there are things outside an individual and God, things cannot be configured to suit the individual perfectly. He also introduces the concept of Free Will and how that further inhibits everyone being pain-free all the time, although he does allow and say miracles do exist. Lewis postulates that maybe this world is not the 'best of all possible' universes but the only possible one. He acknowledges the objection that if God is good and he saw how much suffering it would produce why would he do it. Lewis doesn’t know how to answer that type of question and says that that is not his objective, but only to conceive how goodness (assured on other grounds) and suffering are without contradiction.

=== Divine Goodness ===
Lewis draws an analogy to compare our understanding of goodness to that of God’s. He says it differs like that of a child’s attempt at drawing a circle for the first time to that of a perfect circle. He goes on to say that people don’t want a good God or a Father but a "senile benevolence who likes to see the young people enjoying themselves." Love and kindness are not one and the same thing. Lewis then summarizes all the different kinds of loves and analogies in scripture that describe God’s relation to humans. Lewis says that the problem of pain is insoluble if we attach a "trivial meaning to the word ‘love’." God loves His goodness into us and our highest activity is response and not initiation; the love may cause us pain but only because the object needs alteration to become fully lovable.

=== Human Wickedness ===
Lewis starts off by asking why humans need so much alteration. Immediately he shares the Christian answer that humans have used free will to become very bad. He then talks about when Jesus and the apostles preached people understood a real consciousness deserving a divine anger, but in the 20th century people don’t believe they are "mortally ill". He blames misattributing kindness to ourselves and the effect of psychoanalysis on the public mind for driving out a healthy sense of shame from our collective minds.

Lewis acknowledges the critique of what specific, individual harm have we done to God for God to be always angry. Lewis says that when a person feels real guilt, this critique falls away. "When we merely say that we are bad, the ‘wrath’ of God seems a barbarous doctrine; as soon as we perceive our badness, it appears inevitable, a mere corollary from God’s goodness."

He then goes on to add a few considerations "to make the reality less incredible".

1. We are deceived by looking on the outside of things: we should not mistake our inevitably limited utterances for a full account of the worst that is inside.
2. While there is a social conscious and corporate guilt, don’t let the idea distract you from your own "old-fashioned guilts" that have nothing to do with the ‘system’. Often, it’s an excuse for evading the real issue. Once we’ve learned of our individual corruption, we can go on to think about corporate guilt.
3. "We have a strange illusion that mere time cancels sin."
4. We must guard against the feeling that there is "safety in number".
5. Different ages excelled in different virtues. Other times might have been more courageous or chaste but God was not content with them, so why should he be content with us.
6. All the virtues need to control one another, if not then the virtue which stands above others will tumble all into vice.
7. The Holiness of God is something more and other than moral perfection.
8. Don’t shift blame for human behavior to the Creator. While it is not possible to follow the moral law perfectly, "the ultimate problem must not be used as one more means of evasion". You could be as pious as the early Christians but many don’t intend it.

Lewis then says that he doesn’t believe in the doctrine of Total Depravity on logical and experiential grounds. Also, shame is of value, not as an emotion but for the insight that it provides. He shares how he notices that the holier a man is the more fully aware he is of his vileness.

=== The Fall of Man ===
Lewis explains how the Christian answer to human wickedness is the doctrine of the Fall: "Man is now a horror to God and to himself and a creature ill-adapted to the universe not because God made him so but because he has made himself so by the abuse of his free will."

He details two "sub-Christian" theories which the doctrine of the Fall guards against: Monism and Dualism. The first saying God, being above good and evil, produces impartially the effects to which we call good and evil. The second saying there’s an equal and independent power that produces evil.

Lewis says that he doesn’t think the doctrine of the Fall answers whether it was better for God to create or not to create. Or if it is ‘just’ to punish individuals for the faults of their remote ancestors.

He then reviews the story from Genesis 3 and follows it with an argument saying that we cannot call our early ancestors more ‘savage’ than we are today. He gives a defense of civilizations past and says they were probably just as civilized like us but in different ways.

He concludes that science has nothing to say against the doctrine of the Fall, but acknowledges a more philosophical problem. That the idea of sin presupposes a law to sin against and the first man could not commit the first sin. Lewis points out though that the doctrine doesn’t say the sin was a social sin but a sin against God, an act of disobedience. Lewis says, "We must look for the great sin on a deeper and more timeless level than that of social morality."

Lewis shares how Saint Augustine called this sin Pride and all humans face it when they become aware of God as God and itself as self. He gives a few illustrations of this choice then paints a picture of what he guesses actually happened when Man fell.

After his illustration, Lewis says, "the act of self-will on the part of the creature, which constitutes an utter falseness to its creaturely position, is the only sin that can be conceived as the Fall". God then began "ruling" Man not by the laws of the spirit but by the laws of nature. Therefore, the human spirit moved from being the master of human nature to become a mere lodger or prisoner in its own house. Lewis then says this condition was passed down biologically. He says that our present condition is because we are a part of a spoiled species, not that we’re suffering for the rebellion of remote ancestors.

Lewis says that his explanation is shallow for he has said nothing about the trees of life and knowledge of good and evil, and nothing about what the apostle Paul has said on the subject. He also uses an analogy to quantum physics in that when we try to draw illustrations we are moving further away from reality. He does use an example from the Old Testament to show how original sin might have been passed down if we take a more communal/societal view of things. He sums up the chapter by saying "man, as a species, spoiled himself, and that good, to us in our present state, must therefore mean primarily remedial or corrective good".

=== Human Pain ===
He says that pain is inherent in a world where souls meet and souls acting wickedly towards each other probably accounts for four-fifths of the World’s pain. And he says it’s a legitimate question to ask why humans are given permission to torture each other. He refines his previous statement that the people can only experience remedial good and says it’s an incomplete answer. He classifies pain into two senses: 1) a physical sensation and 2) any experience, physical or mental, that person dislikes.

He says that the proper aim of any creature is to self-surrender – to offer back the will which we claim as our own, and this necessity is a daily occurrence which is inherently painful. He says this process is made easier through pain itself because 1) people would not surrender if all was well, so pain is recognizable and unmasked evil; "every man knows something is wrong when he is being hurt". 2) Pain shatters the illusion that we have enough for ourselves. 3) We know we’re acting for God’s sake if the material action of our choice is painful or at least contrary to our inclinations.

For the first, Lewis says sadists and masochists are no different, they just isolate and exaggerate an aspect of normal pleasure. The sadists exaggerates the moment of union by saying "I am such a master that I even torment you" and the masochist exaggerates the complementary side by saying "I am so enthralled that I welcome even pain at your hands." If these people recognized pain for what it was, their habits would cease to provide a pleasurable stimulus.

To underline his point he says probably the most famous line from this book: "God whispers to us in our pleasures, speaks in our conscience, but shouts in our pain: it is His megaphone to rouse a deaf world."

He says that a recognition of this truth underlies the universal feeling that bad men ought to suffer – a sense of retribution. While some people want to do away with retribution, Lewis says that to do so would make all punishment unjust and any act to correct behavior would contradict itself. On another level, Lewis says that we experience a thirst for revenge. This passion though loses sight of the end in the means. He notes how biblical ancestors probably meant retribution when they spoke of God’s ‘vengeance’. Pain gives the only opportunity for bad men to amend.

=== Human Pain, Continued ===
In this chapter Lewis discusses six propositions that are not connected but need saying for a complete view of human pain:

1. "There is a paradox about tribulation in Christianity."
2. "If tribulation is a necessary element in redemption we must anticipate that it will never cease till God sees the world to be either redeemed or no further redeemable."
3. The Christian doctrine of self-surrender and obedience is purely theological and not political.
4. "We are never safe, but we have plenty of fun, and some ecstasy… Our Father refreshes us on the journey with some pleasant inns but will not encourage us to mistake them for home."
5. "We must never make the problem of pain worse than it is by vague talk about 'unimaginable sum of human misery'."
6. Of all evils, pain is only sterilized or disinfected evil. Is this about perspective? Lewis distinguishes between pain and evil.

=== Hell ===
Lewis restates that allowing free will means that some people will choose rebellion and not all will be saved. He says that there was no other doctrine that he wished he could remove more, that it has the support of scripture, Jesus Christ himself, and reason. While some overdo it and tragedies have come from espousing the doctrine, Christians preach it because it is a terrible possibility and its horrors are worse.

Lewis then states the real problem: "so much mercy, yet still there is Hell". He first says that the doctrine is not tolerable but it is moral. Then lays out the ordinary objections and his responses to them.

1) Many people, Lewis says, object to retributive punishment. He reminds readers of a previous chapter of how he showed a core of righteousness in punishment/pain and how it could lead to repentance. But what if the punishment didn’t lead there? He asks the reader if they could really allow a wicked person to go forever into eternity happy and thinking they had the last laugh? If a person wouldn’t allow that, then is that feeling their own wickedness or spite? Or does it reveal the conflict between Justice and Mercy? He quotes Aquinas and Aristotle who says that suffering and shame, respectively, are not good in and of themselves but as a means to an end. He finishes his response to this objection by saying "to condone an evil is simply to ignore it, to treat it as if it were good".

Before going to the next objection Lewis references Christ’s words about Hell. In addition to Hell being like a sentence given at a tribunal, Christ says that men prefer darkness to light and that men choose Hell as a final act of cutting themselves off from all things that are not themselves.

2) The second objection Lewis responds to is the disproportion between eternal damnation and transitory sin: if hell is for eternity then it as a punishment far outweighs anything we could do on earth. Lewis responds by first saying that the idea of eternity as a mere prolongation of time is uncertain and offers his metaphor for what eternity might really look like. He also says that a finality of judgment must come some time and omniscience would know when.

3) A third objection is the "fruitful intensity of the pains of hell" as depicted famously in medieval art and passages of scripture. Lewis says destruction implies the creation of something else, like ashes, gases, and heat after burning a log, so what if Hell is the ‘remains’ of souls? Then Lewis says, "What is cast (or casts itself) into hell is not a man: it is ‘remains’. To be a complete man means to have the passions obedient to the will and the will offered to God: to have been a man – to be an ex-man or ‘damned ghost’ – would presumably mean to consist of a will utterly centered in its self and passions utterly uncontrolled by the will." He then finishes off suggesting "hell is hell, not from its own point of view, but from the heavenly point of view".

4) The fourth objection he states is that no "charitable man" blessed in heaven could stay there while even one human soul was in hell, and if so would he be more merciful than God? Lewis says that this objection assumes that heaven and hell "co-exist in unilinear time" like the histories of two countries. Lewis points to Christ who emphasizes not the point of duration but that of finality. He says that we know more about heaven than we do of hell "for heaven is the home of humanity… It is in no sense parallel to heaven: it is ‘the darkness outside’, the outer rim where being fades away into nonentity".

5) The final objection says that the ultimate loss of a single soul means the defeat of omnipotence. Lewis agrees that it does. He says that by creating beings with free will God submits to the possibility of such a defeat. Lewis calls this defeat a miracle, "for to make things which are not Itself and thus to become, in a sense, capable of being resisted by its own handiwork, is the most astonishing and unimaginable of all feats we attribute to a deity".

Lewis concludes the chapter by saying that all answers to objections of hell are themselves a question: "What are you asking God to do?" Whatever it is you would like God has already done. To forgive them? It is already done. To leave them alone? That is what He does. Also, Lewis reminds the reader that in discussing Hell we should not keep our friends and enemies before our eyes since both obscure reason, but to think of ourselves.

=== Animal Pain ===
Lewis turns his attention to another facet of the problem of pain, that of animal pain. He says the Christian explanation for human pain doesn’t work because so far as we can see animals are incapable of sin or virtue so they neither deserve pain nor are improved by it. It is not an unimportant question, though, since all "plausible grounds for questioning the goodness of God is very important indeed".

Lewis admits that whatever we say about animal pain is purely speculative. He says that we can deduce from the doctrine that God is good that the appearance of cruelty in the animal kingdom is an illusion. But everything after that is guesswork he says.

He continues though by ruling out another speculation. He says that the ruthless biological competition has no moral importance: good and evil only appear with sentience. Lewis raises three questions: 1) why do animals suffer? 2) how did disease and pain enter the animal world? 3) how can animal suffering be reconciled with the justice of God? Although admitting that we don’t know the answer to the first question he still offers his guesses. He begins by distinguishing between types of animals then distinguishing between sentience and consciousness. He says that sentience is experiencing a "succession of perceptions" where consciousness sees the experiences a part of a larger whole. For example, a sentient being would have the experience of thing A then thing B then thing C where consciousness sees it as having the experience of ABC. He says humans are sentient but unconscious when they are sleepwalking.

Lewis allows that some higher form animals (like apes and elephants) might have a rudimentary individual self but says that their suffering might not be suffering in any real sense and humans might be projecting themselves onto the beasts.

Answering the second question, Lewis says that the Fall of Man could have brought about animal suffering. Animal nature could have also been corrupted prior to Adam by Satan because the "intrinsic evil of the animal world lies in the fact that some animals live by destroying each other". Lewis pontificates that Man might have been brought into the World to perform a redemptive function.

Lastly, Lewis responds to the question of justice and animal suffering by making somewhat of a joke. He says that if one wants to make room for animal immortality, although the scriptures are silent, then "a heaven for mosquitoes and a hell for men could very conveniently be combined". He goes on though to say that the objection of scripture’s silence would be fatal only if Christian revelation intended to be a system to answer all questions. Lewis says that "the curtain has been rent at one point, and at one point only, to reveal our immediate practical necessities and not to satisfy our intellectual curiosity".

He says though, assuming that their selfhood is not an illusion, animals cannot be considered in and of themselves. "Man is to be understood only in his relation to God. The beasts are to be understood only in their relation to man and, through man, to God." Lewis then tries to correct the notion that many people have that the ‘real’ or ‘natural’ animal is the wild one while the tame animal is unnatural. Lewis says that Christians must believe that since they were given dominion over beasts that everything they do concerning them is either a lawful exercise or a sacrilegious abuse. So the tame animal is the only natural one and any real self it has is owed entirely to its master, and if the animal does have immortality it is through their master. Lewis admits that he’s only talking about a privileged case and not about wild animals or those ill-treated domestic ones.

Lewis says that Christians hesitate to suppose animal immorality for two reasons: 1) it would obscure the spiritual difference between beast and man and 2) it would be a clumsy assertion of Divine goodness.

He continues with further speculations before concluding the chapter saying, "I think the lion, when he has ceased to be dangerous, will still be awful: indeed, what we shall then first see that of which the present fangs and claws are a clumsy, and satanically perverted, imitation. There will still be something like the shaking of a golden mane: and often the good Duke will say, ‘Let him roar again.’"

=== Heaven ===
Lewis starts off the last chapter of the book by stating that not mentioning heaven is "leaving out almost the whole of one side of the account" and would not be a Christian one. He says that we don’t need to be afraid that heaven is a bribe because heaven offers us nothing that "a mercenary soul can desire", that the pure in heart will see God because they are the only ones who want to. "Love, by definition, seeks to enjoy its object" like a man wanting to marry the woman he loves.

Lewis paints the picture that there’s a signature on each soul that we’re aware of but don’t have all the details about and that we can never really possess. He says heredity and environment might produce this signature but those are only the instruments by which God creates a soul. "The mold in which a key is made would be a strange thing, if you had never seen a key: and the key itself a strange thing if you had never seen a lock."

He continues to paint a beautiful illustration of heaven and how it would fit every real, human desire we ever had. How you, listener, will behold Him and not another. "God will look to every soul like its first love because He is its first love." He goes on "The world is like a picture with a golden background, and we the figures in that picture. Until you step off the plane of the picture into the large dimensions of death you cannot see the gold."

If this opinion is false, he says, then something better than his opinion is waiting. That heaven is "doubtless the continually successful, yet never complete, attempt by each soul to communicate its unique vision to all others (and that by means whereof earthly art and philosophy are but clumsy imitations) is also among the ends for which the individual was created. For union exists only between distincts." Lewis shows how this is even demonstrated in the Trinity: "The Father eternally begets the Son and the Holy Ghost proceeds: deity introduces distinction within itself so that the union of reciprocal loves may transcend mere arithmetical unity or self-identity."

Lewis furthers the illustration saying that the soul is a hollow that God continually fills in eternity followed by a constant emptying, self-dying, self-giving by the soul so as to become more truly itself. This self-sacrifice, Lewis says, is not something we can escape by remaining earthly or being saved. "What is outside this self-giving is simply and solely Hell". This "holy game" is a party led by God himself where he gives Himself eternally and receives Himself back in sacrifice.

He finishes by saying that "all pains and pleasures we have known on earth are early initiations in the movements of that dance… it does not exist for us, but we for it".

=== Appendix ===
Lewis takes this opportunity to color in some lines using some clinical experiences from a fellow Inkling – Dr. R. Havard. He talks about the effects of physical and mental pain, the latter of which Lewis says is the hardest to bear and less visible. He points out the phenomenon that many recognize and answer the challenge of pain and preserve their serenity and selflessness and sometimes produce brilliant work and sharpen their characters into tempered steel. He concludes the book by saying "Pain provides an opportunity for heroism; the opportunity is seized with surprising frequency."

== Relation to other works ==
Lewis' philosophical approach in Problem of Pain bears some similarity to his later, more personal, approach to the problem of evil in A Grief Observed, a reflection on his own experiences of grief and anguish after the death of his wife.

== See also ==
- Problem of evil
