= Joachim Wach =

German-American religious scholar

- Born: January 25, 1898; Chemnitz, Kingdom of Saxony
- Died: August 27, 1955 (aged 57); Switzerland
- Citizenship: American
- Known for: Theory of religion

Academic work
- Discipline: History of religions
- Institutions: University of Chicago Divinity School; Brown University; Leipzig University

Joachim Ernst Adolphe Felix Wach (German: [vax]; January 25, 1898 – August 27, 1955) was a German religious scholar from Chemnitz, who emphasized a distinction between the Religious Studies (Religionswissenschaft) and the philosophy of religion.

Wach was descended on both sides from the famous Mendelssohn family, both the philosopher Moses Mendelssohn and the composer Felix Mendelssohn Bartholdy. He shared the latter's love of music and was said to have inherited some important papers and relics of his ancestor. After schooling in Dresden, he enlisted in the German army in 1916, where he served as a cavalry officer. After World War I, he studied at the Ludwig-Maximilians-Universität München, the Friedrich Wilhelm University of Berlin, the University of Freiburg, and Leipzig University, where he received his PhD in 1922. He taught at Leipzig University. His Habilitationsschrift, entitled Religionswissenschaft, is widely considered a landmark document in the field of the history of religions.

Though Wach's family had long since converted from Judaism to Christianity, he was nonetheless driven out of his teaching post by the Nazis in the early 1930s. He was able to immigrate to the United States, where he took up a post at Brown University, first as visiting professor of Biblical Literature (1935–1939) and then as associate professor (1939–1946). Raised as a Lutheran, he became an Episcopalian shortly after coming to the United States. He was granted United States citizenship in 1946.

Wach taught at the University of Chicago Divinity School from 1945 to 1955, becoming the chair of the History of Religions area, which had just been moved to the Divinity School from its earlier home in the Division of the Humanities. In his lectures and his writings, he emphasized a comprehensive study of religion, focusing on religious experience, religious praxis, and religious communities.

According to the University of Chicago Archives, Wach used the methods of the social sciences to better understand religious thought. Developing the field known as the Sociology of Religion, he maintained that the founder of a new religion experienced a revelation illuminating the way the world worked. He then began to acquire disciples who became a closely knit circle directed towards the founder with whom they each had intimate contact. The solidarity of this relationship bound the disciples together and differentiated them from other forms of social organization. Membership in the group required a break with past life and its everyday pursuits in order to focus on the new knowledge to the extent that ties of family and kinship would be relaxed or severed.

Wach died unexpectedly of a heart attack (though he had had a history of heart trouble) on August 27, 1955, in Locarno, Switzerland.

== Writings ==
- Der Erlösungsgedanke und seine Deutung (1922)
- Das Verstehen: Grundzüge einer Geschichte der hermeneutischen Theorie im 19. Jahrhundert (3 vols, 1926–1933)
- Religionswissenschaft: Prolegomena zu ihrer wissenschaftstheoretischen Grundlegung (1924)
- Meister und Jünger : zwei religionssoziologische Betrachtungen (1924)
- Sociology of Religion (1947)
- Types of Religious Experience: Christian and Non-Christian (1951)
- The Comparative Study of Religions (posthumous, 1958)
- Understanding and Believing: Essays (1968)
- Introduction to the History of Religions (1988: English translation of Religionswissenschaft)
