= Gerard van der Leeuw =

Dutch religion scholar and politician

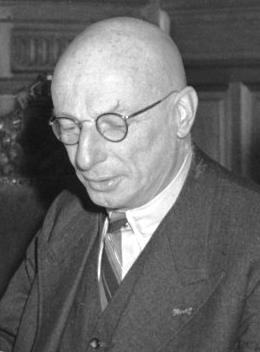
- Van der Leeuw in 1945
- Born: 18 March 1890; The Hague, Netherlands
- Died: 18 November 1950 (aged 60); Utrecht, Netherlands

Philosophical work
- Institutions: University of Groningen
- Main interests: Phenomenology of religion Comparative religion Philosophy of religion
- Notable works: Religion in Essence and Manifestation: A Study in Phenomenology

Minister of Education
- In office 25 June 1945 – 3 July 1946
- Prime Minister: Willem Schermerhorn
- Preceded by: Gerrit Bolkestein
- Succeeded by: Jos Gielen

Personal details
- Party: Labour Party

Gerardus (Gerard) van der Leeuw (18 March 1890 – 18 November 1950) was a Dutch historian and philosopher of religion, ordained minister and politician.

Gerard van der Leeuw studied theology and egyptology at Leiden University, in Göttingen and Berlin. He was promoted there to doctor of theology in Leiden in 1916. After graduation he was called as ordained minister in the Dutch Reformed Church (Nederlandse Hervormde Kerk): in The Hague as candidate and subsequently in 's-Heerenberg with a full appointment. In 1918 he was appointed as professor in history of religion at the University of Groningen.

He applied the concept of phenomenology to religion. He is best known for his work Religion in Essence and Manifestation: A Study in Phenomenology, an application of philosophical phenomenology to religion. It was first published in 1933 under the German title Phänomenologie der Religion, translated into English in 1938 and into French in a revised and updated edition in 1948.

From 1945–1946 Van der Leeuw was Minister of Education of the Netherlands for the Labour Party (appointed immediately after the end of the war).

Before the war he had been a member of the conservative Christian Historical Union.
