= Numinous =

Arousing spiritual or religious emotion; mysterious or awe-inspiring

Numinous (/ˈnjuːmɪnəs/) means "arousing spiritual or religious emotion; mysterious or awe-inspiring"; also "supernatural" or "appealing to the aesthetic sensibility." The term was given its present sense by the German theologian and philosopher Rudolf Otto in his influential 1917 German book The Idea of the Holy. He also used the phrase mysterium tremendum as another description for the phenomenon. Otto's concept of the numinous influenced thinkers including Carl Jung, Mircea Eliade, and C. S. Lewis. It has been applied to theology, psychology, religious studies, literary analysis, and descriptions of psychedelic experiences.

== Etymology ==
Numinous was derived in the 17th century from the Latin numen, meaning "nod" and thus, in a transferred (figurative, metaphorical) sense, "divine will, divine command, divinity or majesty." Numinous is etymologically unrelated to Immanuel Kant's noumenon, a Greek term referring to an unknowable reality underlying all things.

== Rudolf Otto ==
The word was given its present sense by the German theologian and philosopher Rudolf Otto in his influential 1917 book Das Heilige, which appeared in English as The Idea of the Holy in 1923.

Otto writes that while the concept of "the holy" is often used to convey moral perfection—and does entail this—it contains another distinct element, beyond the ethical sphere, for which he uses the term numinous. He explains "numinous" as a "non-rational, non-sensory experience or feeling whose primary and immediate object is outside the self." This mental state "presents itself as ganz Andere, wholly other, a condition absolutely sui generis and incomparable whereby the human being finds himself utterly abashed."

Otto argues that because the numinous is irreducible and sui generis it cannot be defined in terms of other concepts or experiences, and that the reader must therefore be "guided and led on by consideration and discussion of the matter through the ways of his own mind, until he reaches the point at which 'the numinous' in him perforce begins to stir... In other words, our X cannot, strictly speaking, be taught, it can only be evoked, awakened in the mind." Chapters 4 to 6 are devoted to attempting to evoke the numinous and its various aspects.

Using Latin, he describes it as a mystery (Latin: mysterium) that is at once terrifying (tremendum) and fascinating (fascinans). He writes:

The feeling of it may at times come sweeping like a gentle tide pervading the mind with a tranquil mood of deepest worship. It may pass over into a more set and lasting attitude of the soul, continuing, as it were, thrillingly vibrant and resonant, until at last it dies away and the soul resumes its "profane," non-religious mood of everyday experience. [...] It has its crude, barbaric antecedents and early manifestations, and again it may be developed into something beautiful and pure and glorious. It may become the hushed, trembling, and speechless humility of the creature in the presence of—whom or what? In the presence of that which is a Mystery inexpressible and above all creatures.

== Later use of the concept ==
Otto's use of the term as referring to a characteristic of religious experience was influential among certain intellectuals of the subsequent generation. For example, "numinous" as understood by Otto was a frequently quoted concept in the writings of Carl Jung, and C. S. Lewis. Lewis described the numinous experience in The Problem of Pain as follows:

Suppose you were told there was a tiger in the next room: you would know that you were in danger and would probably feel fear. But if you were told "There is a ghost in the next room," and believed it, you would feel, indeed, what is often called fear, but of a different kind. It would not be based on the knowledge of danger, for no one is primarily afraid of what a ghost may do to him, but of the mere fact that it is a ghost. It is "uncanny" rather than dangerous, and the special kind of fear it excites may be called Dread. With the Uncanny one has reached the fringes of the Numinous. Now suppose that you were told simply "There is a mighty spirit in the room," and believed it. Your feelings would then be even less like the mere fear of danger: but the disturbance would be profound. You would feel wonder and a certain shrinking—a sense of inadequacy to cope with such a visitant and of prostration before it—an emotion which might be expressed in Shakespeare's words "Under it my genius is rebuked." This feeling may be described as awe, and the object which excites it as the Numinous.

Jung applied the concept of the numinous to psychology and psychotherapy, arguing it was therapeutic and brought greater self-understanding, and stating that to him religion was about a "careful and scrupulous observation... of the numinosum". The notion of the numinous and the wholly Other were also central to the religious studies of ethnologist Mircea Eliade. Mysterium tremendum, another phrase coined by Otto to describe the numinous, is presented by Aldous Huxley in The Doors of Perception in this way:

The literature of religious experience abounds in references to the pains and terrors overwhelming those who have come, too suddenly, face to face with some manifestation of the mysterium tremendum. In theological language, this fear is due to the in-compatibility between man's egotism and the divine purity, between man's self-aggravated separateness and the infinity of God.

In a book-length scholarly treatment of the subject in fantasy literature, Chris Brawley devotes chapters to the concept in "The Rime of the Ancient Mariner" by Samuel Taylor Coleridge, in Phantastes by George Macdonald, in the Chronicles of Narnia by C. S. Lewis, and The Lord of the Rings by J. R. R. Tolkien; and in work by Algernon Blackwood and Ursula Le Guin (e.g., The Centaur and Buffalo Gals, Won't You Come Out Tonight, respectively).

Neuroscientist Christof Koch has described awe from experiences such as entering a cathedral, saying he gets "a feeling of luminosity out of the numinous," though he does not hold the Catholic religious beliefs with which he was raised.

In a 2010 article titled "James Cameron's Cathedral: Avatar Revives the Religious Spectacle" published in the Journal of Religion and Film, academic Craig Detweiler describes how the global blockbuster movie Avatar "traffics in Rudolph Otto’s notion of the numinous, the wholly other that operates beyond reason. [...] As spectacle, Avatar remains virtually critic proof, a trip to Otto’s mysterium tremendum et fascinans." Cameron himself mentioned this in a 2022 interview with BBC Radio 1 when trying to explain the first movie's success, saying "There was that element that I call—borrowing from Carl Sagan—the numinous." Sagan specifically explored the numinous concept in his 1985 novel Contact.

Psychologist Susan Blackmore describes both mystical experiences and psychedelic experiences as numinous. In 2009, Czech psychiatrist Stanislav Grof re-released his 1975 book Realms of the Human Unconscious under the title LSD: Doorway to the Numinous: The Groundbreaking Psychedelic Research into Realms of the Human Unconscious. In his 2018 book How to Change Your Mind, journalist Michael Pollan describes his experience trying the powerful psychedelic substance 5-MeO-DMT, including the following reflection on his experience of ego dissolution:

Here words fail. In truth, there were no flames, no blast, no thermonuclear storm; I'm grasping at metaphor in the hope of forming some stable and shareable concept of what was unfolding in my mind. In the event, there was no coherent thought, just pure and terrible sensation. Only afterward did I wonder if this is what the mystics call the mysterium tremendum—the blinding unendurable mystery (whether of God or some other Ultimate or Absolute) before which humans tremble in awe.

== See also ==
- Analytical psychology
- Argument from religious experience
- Fear of God
- Religious ecstasy
- Religious experience
- Sacred
- Sacred–profane dichotomy
- Sense of wonder
- Soul flight
