= Beebe =

Beebe may refer to:

== People ==
=== Given name ===
- Beebe Steven Lynk (1872–1948), American chemist

=== Surname ===
- Agnes Leist Beebe (1874–1941), American singer, voice teacher
- Beatrice Beebe (born 1946), American psychologist
- Carey Beebe (born 1960), Australian harpsichord maker
- Carolyn Beebe (1873–1950), American pianist
- Chad Beebe (born 1994), American football player
- Chase Beebe (born 1985), American mixed martial artist
- Clara W. Beebe (1868–1927), American leader of The Church of Jesus Christ of Latter-day Saints
- Dion Beebe (born 1968), Australian-born South African cinematographer
- Dan Beebe (born 1957), American football commissioner
- Don Beebe (born 1964), American football player
- Dora Beebe (died 1994), American murder victim
- Fred Beebe (1879–1957), American baseball player
- Ford Beebe (1888–1978), American screenwriter and director
- Frank Beebe (1914–2008), Canadian falconer, writer and wildlife illustrator
- Fritz Beebe (1914–1973), American newspaper publisher
- George M. Beebe (1836–1927), American politician
- Gilbert Wheeler Beebe (1912–2003), American epidemiologist and statistician
- Hank Beebe (1926–2023), American composer
- Herman K. Beebe, American fraudster
- James D. M. Beebe (1827–1917), Sandy Hook Pilot
- John Beebe (born 1939), American psychiatrist
- Keith Beebe (1921–1998), American football player
- Lewis C. Beebe (1891–1951), United States Army general
- Lottie Beebe (born 1953), American school superintendent
- Lucius Beebe (1902-1966), American author, journalist, and gourmand
- Matthew Beebe (1833–1901), American businessman and politician
- Marjorie Beebe (1908–1983), American actress
- Mike Beebe (born 1946), governor of Arkansas
- Minnie Mason Beebe (1865–1955), American professor of history and French
- Milton Earl Beebe (1840–1923), American architect
- Richard Beebe (1929–1998), American radio personality
- Reta Beebe (born 1936), American astronomer
- Roswell Beebe (1795–1856), American politician
- S. P. Beebe (1876–1930), American cancer researcher
- Steven A. Beebe (born 1950), American academic
- Troy Beebe (born 1962), American racing driver
- William Beebe (1877–1962), American naturalist, explorer, and author
- William Sully Beebe (1841–1898), American Union army officer

== Places ==
- Beebe, Arkansas
- Beebe, Ohio, an unincorporated community
- Beebe, South Dakota, an unincorporated community
- Beebe, Washington, an unincorporated community
- Beebe, Wisconsin, an unincorporated community
- Beebe Mountain, in Washington state
- Beebe River, in New Hampshire, United States
- Beebe Windmill, in Sag Harbor, New York

== Other uses ==
- Beebe Healthcare, serving Sussex County, Delaware, United States

== See also ==
- BB (disambiguation)
- Bebe (disambiguation)
- Bebee (disambiguation)
- Beeb (disambiguation)
- Beebe House (disambiguation)
- Beebe Lake (disambiguation)
- Beebe Plain (disambiguation)
- Beebee (disambiguation)
- Bibi (disambiguation)
