= Bibi =

Bibi is a given name, nickname and surname.

== People with the nickname or stage name ==
- Bibi Andersson (1935–2019), Swedish actress
- Bibi (artist) (born 1964), French visual artist Fabrice Cahoreau
- Bibi Baskin (born 1952), Irish former TV and radio presenter
- Bibi Besch (1940–1996), Austrian-American actress
- Bibi Bourelly (born 1994), German singer and songwriter
- Bibi (futsal player), Emanuel Luís Marques Walter de Magalhães (born 1980), Portuguese
- Bibi Lindström (1904–1984), Swedish art director
- Bibi McGill (born 1964), American guitarist
- Bibi Osterwald (1918–2002), American actress
- Bibi (singer) (born 1998), South Korean singer
- Bibi Torriani (1911–1988), Swiss hockey player and luger
- Bibi Zhou (born 1985), Chinese singer
- Benjamin Netanyahu (born 1949), Israeli Prime Minister 1996–1999, 2009–2021, since 2022
- Bianca Andreescu (born 2000), Canadian tennis player
- Stefano Battistelli (born 1970), Italian former swimmer

== People with the given name ==
- Bibi Aisha, Afghan civilian woman
- Bibi Amtus Salam (died 1985), Indian social worker and disciple of Mahatma Gandhi
- Bibi Ayesha, Afghan military leader
- Bibi Chemnitz (born 1983), Greenlandic fashion designer
- Bibi Lee (died 1984), American formerly missing person
- Bibi Medoua (born 1993), Cameroonian football defender
- Bibi Russell (born 1950), Bangladeshi fashion designer, businessperson and former model
- Bibiana Fernández (born 1954), Spanish actress, singer and model

== People with the surname ==
- Aisha Bibi, 12th-century noble woman, after whom a memorial and village are named in modern Kazakhstan
- Aryeh Bibi (born 1943), Israeli politician
- Asia Bibi (born 1971), Pakistani Christian woman Aasiya Noreen who was acquitted of blasphemy
- Bushra Bibi, wife of Imran Khan and First Lady of Pakistan
- Chand Bibi (1550–1599 CE), also known as Chand Khatun or Chand Sultana, Indian Muslim woman warrior.
- Jonathan Bibi (born 1984), Seychellois football player
- Michael Bibi (born 1989 or 1990), London-based disc jockey and music producer
- Mordechai Bibi (1922–2023), Israeli politician
- Mukhtaran Bibi (born c. 1972, now known as Mukhtār Mā'ī), survivor of a gang rape in Pakistan
- Noorjahan Kakon Bibi, female freedom fighter in Bangladesh
- Pari Bibi, 17th-century noble woman buried in Lalbagh Fort, Dhaka, Bangladesh
- Taramon Bibi, female freedom fighter in Bangladesh
- Taj Bibi, consort of Mughal Emperor Jahangir and mother of Shah Jahan
- Yigal Bibi (born 1942), Israeli former politician

== Fictional characters ==
- Bibi Z99944X, in Canadian TV series Bibi et Geneviève
- Bibi Blocksberg, a German children's radio series
- Bibi Dahl, in the James Bond film For Your Eyes Only
- Bibi, in Brawl Stars, a video game
- Bibi, from the film The President's Cake

== Other uses of the name ==
- Bibi (pronoun), a pseudo pronoun, an affectionate way to say "me" in French
- A Coahuiltecan tribe, also called the Bibit
- Bibi, a lioness and member of the Marsh Pride featured for many years on the BBC series Big Cat Diary

== See also ==
- Ibn Bibi, 13th century Iranian historian
- BB (disambiguation)
