= Bebee =

Bebee or variants may refer to:

- beBee, a social network for business collaboration
- Bebee, West Virginia, a place in the U.S.
- Tibicos grains, or bébées, a brewing ingredient of bacteria and yeast
- "Bébée", an 1874 short story by Ouida, that became the basis of the film Two Little Wooden Shoes
- "La Bébée", a 19th-century dance in Guernsey
- Bebee, a character in Turkish children's TV show Pepee

== See also ==
- Beebee (disambiguation)
- Beebe (disambiguation)
- Bebe (disambiguation)
- BB (disambiguation)
- Bibi (disambiguation)
