= Beebe House =

Beebe House and variations may refer to:

- Beebe Homestead, Wakefield, Massachusetts, also known as Lucius Beebe House, listed on the National Register of Historic Places (NRHP) in Middlesex County
- Beebe Estate, Melrose, Massachusetts, listed on the NRHP in Middlesex County
- Dr. Ward Beebe House, Saint Paul, Minnesota, listed on the NRHP in Ramsey County
- Horace Y. Beebe House, Ravenna, Ohio, listed on the NRHP in Portage County
- Marcus Beebe House, Ipswich, South Dakota, listed on the NRHP in Edmunds County
- George Angus and Martha Ansil Beebe House, Provo, Utah, listed on the NRHP in Utah County
- Beebe Ranch, Chincoteague, Virginia, a noted horse ranch and museum in Accomack County
- Beebe House (Platteville, Wisconsin), listed on the NRHP in Grant County

== See also ==
- Piper-Beebe House, Virginia City, Nevada, listed on the NRHP
