= BB =

BB, Bb, or similar, may refer to:

== Arts and entertainment ==
- BB numbers, in the catalogue of works by Béla Bartók
- "BB", a chant supporting Big Brother in Nineteen Eighty-Four
- BB, a 2017 album by Mod Sun
- BB, a character in Beast Wars II: Super Life-Form Transformers
- BB, a character in Fate/Extra CCC and Fate/Grand Order
- Beyond Birthday, a character from the novel Death Note Another Note: The Los Angeles BB Murder Cases
- Big Brother (franchise), a TV reality competition
- 1966 Doctor Who serial The War Machines (production code "BB")
- BB, the protagonist of the Anthology of the Killer series

== Businesses and organizations ==
- BB Bloggingsbooks, an imprint of OmniScriptum
- BB Microlight, a Hungarian aircraft manufacturer
- Banco do Brasil, a Brazilian financial services company
- Bavarian Peasants' League (Bayerischer Bauernbund), a former German political party
- BlackBerry Limited (stock ticker BB), Canadian technology company
- Borderland Beat, a news blog covering the Mexican drug war
- Boys' Brigade, a Christian youth organization

== People ==
- BB, pseudonym of author and artist Denys Watkins-Pitchford
- BB, monogram of artist Bessie Bamber
- BB, American rapper and member of CUZZOS
- B. B. King (1925–2015), American musician and songwriter
- BB Trickz (Belize Nicolau Kazi, born 2000), Spanish rapper
- Brigitte Bardot (1934–2025), French actress often referred to by her initials BB
- Bernard Berenson (1865–1959) art historian, nickname BB
- Benazir Bhutto (1953–2007), former Pakistani prime minister, nickname BB
- Bipasha Basu (born 1979), Indian actress, nickname BB

== Places ==
- BB postcode area, Blackburn, England
- Barbados (ISO 3166 code BB)
  - .bb, top-level domain for Barbados
- Bukit Batok, Singapore

== Science ==
- Bell Beaker culture, an archaeological culture in Europe
- Branch and bound, a method for solving optimization problems
- Busy beaver class in computing theory, a type of Turing Machine
- Beta blocker, medication used to manage arrhythmias

== Transportation ==
=== Air ===
- BB Airways, a former Nepalese airline
- Balair, a defunct Swiss airline, IATA airline code BB
- Seaborne Airlines, IATA airline code BB

=== Rail ===
- Buckingham Branch Railroad, reporting mark BB, in Virginia, U.S.
- Bürgenstock Funicular (Bürgenstock-Bahn), a Swiss funicular railway
- NZR B^{B} class, a New Zealand locomotive class
- B-B, a classification of AAR wheel arrangement of railway locomotives
- B (New York City Subway service), known as BB before 1967

=== Other uses in transportation ===
- Ferrari Berlinetta Boxer, an Italian sports car
- Toyota bB, a car sold in Japan
- BB, classification of battleships of the United States Navy
- North Sumatra (vehicle registration prefix BB)

== Other uses ==
- BB (ammunition), used in a BB gun
- Base on balls in baseball, commonly known as a walk
- BB cream, a type of cosmetic

== See also ==
- B-flat (disambiguation) (B♭)
- B&B (disambiguation)
- Bebe (disambiguation)
- Beebe (disambiguation)
- Beebee (disambiguation)
- Bibi (disambiguation)
- BBCode, a lightweight markup language
- Bed and breakfast or B&B, a small lodging establishment
- Dobol B TV ('Double B TV'), a Philippines news program
- Les B.B., a Canadian band
