= RCOA =

RCOA may refer to:

- Canadian Journal of Speech-Language Pathology and Audiology / Revue canadienne d'orthophonie et d'audiologie
- Royal College of Anaesthetists, professional body for anaesthetists in the UK
- Refugee Council of Australia, advocacy body for refugees
