= Beebee =

Beebee may refer to:

== People ==
- Helen Beebee, British professor of philosophy
- Steve Beebee, British journalist

== Other uses ==
- BB Airways (callsign BEEBEE AIRWAYS), a former Nepalese airline
- BeeBee Fenstermaker, in the play The Days and Nights of BeeBee Fenstermaker

== See also ==
- BB (disambiguation)
- Bee (disambiguation)
- Beebe (disambiguation)
- Bebee (disambiguation)
- Bebe (disambiguation)
- Bibi (disambiguation)
- Bee Bee Bee, American racehorse
