= Bebe =

Bebe, Bèbè, Bebé, Bébé or BeBe may refer to:

== People and fictional characters ==
- Bebe (given name), a list of people and fictional characters with the given name or nickname
- Bebé (Tiago Manuel Dias Correia, born 1990), footballer
- Bebé (futsal player, born 1983) (Euclides Gomes Vaz, born 1983), Portuguese futsal player
- Bebe (futsal player, born 1990) (Rafael García Aguilera), Spanish futsal player
- Bebe (singer), stage name of Spanish singer and actress María Nieves Rebolledo Vila (born 1978)
- Carlos Bebé (Carlos Jorge Fernandes Batalha, born 1992), Cape Verdean footballer
- Tilly Bébé, stage name of Austrian circus performer Mathilde Rupp (1879–1932)

== Arts and entertainment ==
- Bebe (album), by Bebe Rexha, 2023
- "Bebe" (Era Istrefi song), 2022
- "Bebe" (6ix9ine song), 2018
- "Bebe" (Inna and Vinka song), 2019
- "Bebe", a 2008 song from The Love Chronicles by Divine Brown
- "Bébé" (song), by Cynthia Brown
- "Bebé", a 2023 song by Ana Mena from Bellodrama
- Bébé (play), by Émile de Najac and Alfred Hennequin, 1877
- "BeBe", a 2023 episode of The Proud Family: Louder and Prouder

== Other uses ==
- Bebe, Texas, a place in the United States
- Bebe language, in Cameroon
- Bebe Stores, American clothing retailer
- Bebe TV, original name of Duck TV, a children's TV channel
- Cyclone Bebe, a 1972 Pacific Ocean storm
- Peugeot Bébé, an early car by Peugeot

== See also ==
- Bebee (disambiguation)
- Beebe (disambiguation)
- Beeb (disambiguation)
- Beebee (disambiguation)
- Bibi (disambiguation)
- BB (disambiguation)
