= WPH =

WPH may refer to:

- Wiltshire Police Helicopter, superseded by Wiltshire Air Ambulance
- Wat Phnom Airlines, with ICAO code WPH
- Western Pennsylvania Hospital, Pennsylvania, United States
- Women's Pioneer Housing, British housing association
- Whey Protein Hydrolysates, whey proteins predigested and partially hydrolyzed for easier metabolizing
