= Bebe (given name) =

Bebe, Bébé, or BeBe is a given name and a nickname. People with the name include:

== Given name ==
- Bebe Bryans (born 1957), United States national rowing champion and former coach
- Bebe Moore Campbell (1950–2006), American author, journalist and teacher
- Bèbè Kambou (born 1982), Burkinabé footballer
- Bebe Nanaki (c. 1464–1518), elder sister and first follower of Guru Nanak, the founder and first Guru of Sikhism
- Bebe Patten (1913–2004), American Christian evangelist
- Bebe Sweetbriar (born 1962), American drag singer, actor, community activist, and host

== Nickname ==
- Bebé (Tiago Manuel Dias Correia, born 1990), footballer
- Bebé (futsal player, born 1983) (Euclides Gomes Vaz, born 1983), Portuguese futsal player
- Bebe (futsal player, born 1990) (Rafael García Aguilera), Spanish futsal player
- Bebe (singer), stage name of Spanish singer and actress María Nieves Rebolledo Vila (born 1978)
- Mary Anderson (actress, born 1918) (1918–2014), American film and television actress
- Bebe Barron (1925–2008), American electronic music pioneer
- Christian Bérard (1902–1949), known as Bebè, French artist, fashion illustrator and designer
- Bebe Brătianu (1887–1955/56), liberal Romanian politician
- Bebe Buell (born 1953), American model and singer
- Bebe Cave (born 1997), English actress
- Bebe Cool (Moses Ssali, born 1977), African musician
- Bebe Daniels (1901–1971), American actress, singer, dancer, and producer
- Nicolas Ferry (1741–1764), known as "Bébé", court dwarf of Polish King Stanisław Leszczyński
- Bébé Manga (Elizabeth Manga, 1948–2011), Cameroonian makossa singer
- Bebe Neuwirth (born 1958), American actress
- Lucas Nogueira (born 1992), basketball player, known by the name "Bebê
- Roberto Pannunzi (born 1948 or 1946), Italian drug trafficker
- Bebe Pham (Phạm Thị Thúy, born 1983), Vietnamese model and actress
- Bebe Rebozo (1912–1998), American banker and businessman
- Bebe Rexha (born 1989) American singer and songwriter
- BeBe Shopp (born 1930), Miss America in 1948
- Beatrice Vio (born 1997), Italian wheelchair fencer
- BeBe Winans (born 1962), American gospel and R&B singer
- Bebe Wood (born 2001), American actress
- Irina Yusupova (1915–1983), known as Bébé, Russian-born aristocrat
- BeBe Zahara Benet, stage name of American drag performer and singer Nea Marshall Kudi Ngwa (born 1980)
- Bebe Zeva, pseudonym of Rebeccah Hershkovitz (born 1993), Jewish-American fashion model and writer

== Fictional characters ==
- Bebe Benzenheimer, from the 1975 musical A Chorus Line
- Bebe Glazer, in American sitcom Frasier
- Bebe Stevens, in animated TV series South Park
- Bebe, in Japanese anime TV series Puella Magi Madoka Magica
