= House at 20 Hancock Road =

Historic house in Massachusetts, United States

- U.S. National Register of Historic Places
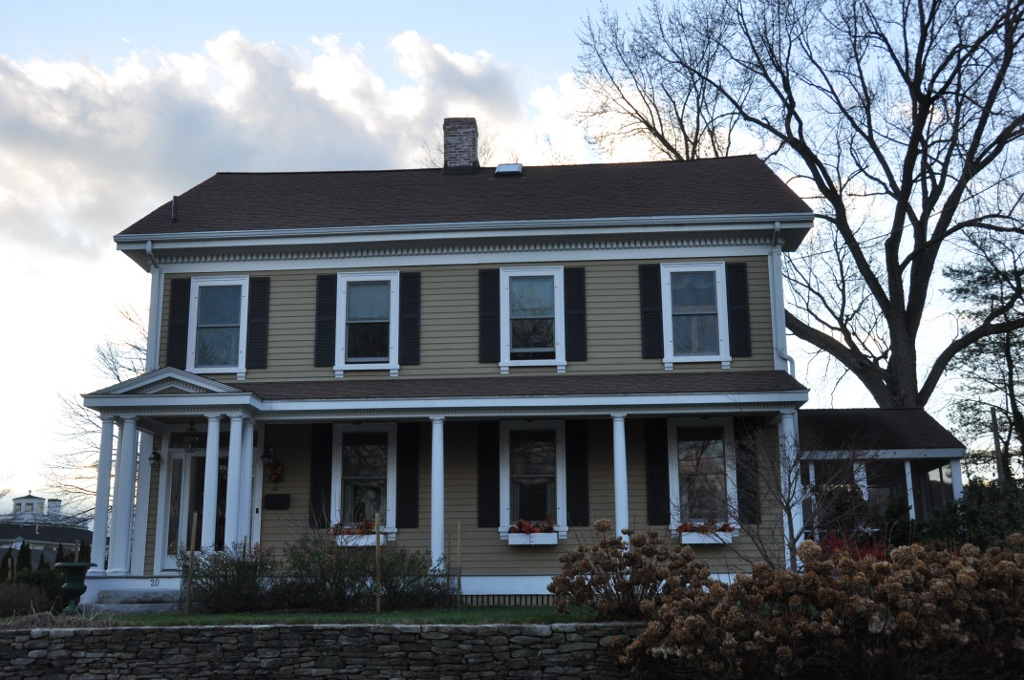

- Location within Massachusetts Location within the United States
- Location: 20 Hancock Rd., Wakefield, Massachusetts
- Coordinates: 42°31′5″N 71°4′25″W
- Architectural style: Italianate
- MPS: Wakefield MRA
- NRHP reference No.: 89000671
- Added to NRHP: July 06, 1989

The House at 20 Hancock Road in Wakefield, Massachusetts is an unusual Italianate house. Built in the 1860s or early 1870s, the two-story wood-frame house is only four bays wide, with the entry door in the leftmost bay. The house has some Italianate details, including dentil molding in the cornice, but is predominantly Greek Revival in character. It is possible this house was built as an outbuilding of the Beebe estate on Main Street, and moved to its present location when Hancock Street was laid out.

The house was listed on the National Register of Historic Places in 1989.

== See also ==
- National Register of Historic Places listings in Wakefield, Massachusetts
- National Register of Historic Places listings in Middlesex County, Massachusetts
