= Catriona M. Steele =

Canadian clinician-scientist

- Known for: former president of Speech-Language and Audiology Canada

Academic background
- Education: M.H.Sc., Speech-Language pathology, 1991, PhD, Speech-Language pathology, 2003, University of Toronto
- Thesis: Kinematics and coordinative dynamics in normal human swallowing. (2003)

Academic work
- Institutions: University of Toronto
- Main interests: Dysphagia
- Website: steeleswallowinglab.ca

Catriona Margaret Steele is a Canadian clinician-scientist. She is a senior scientist at the KITE Research Institute of the University Health Network, full professor in the Department of Speech-Language Pathology, Rehabilitation Sciences Institute at the University of Toronto and Tier 1 Canada Research Chair in Swallowing and Food Oral Processing.

== Education and early career ==
Steele earned her master's degree and PhD from the University of Toronto. After earning her master's, Steele practiced as a medical speech-language pathologist before returning for her doctorate.

From 1998 until 2000, Steele served as president of the Canadian Association of Speech-Language Pathologists and Audiologists (CASLPA). In her role as president, she called for universities to increase their training programs for speech and hearing specialists. She also began to measure pathological signals in swallowing and use surface electromyography as a way to treat Dysphagia.

== Career ==
Upon earning her PhD, Steele accepted a position at the Toronto Rehabilitation Institute. While there, she launched an online learning education course titled An Evidence Based Approach to Dysphasia Intervention in 2004. She also conducted therapy meant to retrain swallowing muscles using biofeedback.

In 2010, Steele and Tom Chau began designing a new technique to detect whether someone with Dysphagia had inhaled food or liquids based on sound wave vibrations. In some cases, her research team used Fluoroscopy, a diagnostic imaging tool, to determine how much food or liquid went down her throat. Using this technique on a stroke victim, Steele worked with Dorothy four times a week for six weeks to strengthen her swallowing muscles, eventually allowing her to return to solid foods. As a result of her research, she was elected a fellow of the American Speech–Language–Hearing Association and received the Eve Kassirer Award for Outstanding Achievement. By 2013, Steele was promoted to Full professor by the University of Toronto, received the Queen Elizabeth II Diamond Jubilee Medal, and earned the CASLPA 2013 Mentorship Award.

As a member of the International Dysphagia Diet Standardisation Initiative (IDDSI) Board, Steele helped set universal guidelines for texture-modified foods and instructions for simple methods to test food and drink consistency. She also worked alongside colleagues at the University of Waterloo to published a study titled Making the Most of Mealtimes, a project focused on the nutritional value of food for seniors at 32 long-term care facilities across Canada. In 2016, Steele received the Speech-Language and Audiology Canada Lifetime Achievement Award for "her pivotal role in the advancement of speech-language pathology, particularly as it relates to the assessment and management of dysphagia."
