= Bibi (disambiguation) =

Bibi is a given name, nickname and surname.

Bibi may also refer to:

- Bibi (title), a South Asian title for women
- Bibi (EP), by Bibi Zho, 2006
- Beneš-Mráz Bibi, a 1930s Czechoslovak aircraft
- Bibi Station, a railway station in Chitose, Hokkaidō, Japan
- Bibi, a kind of Yongno, a Korean legendary creature
- Bibi (Romani cult), a Romani religious holiday
- Bilingual–bicultural education (BiBi), deaf education programs
- BiBi, a sub-unit in the media-mix project Love Live!

== See also ==
- BB (disambiguation)
- Bebe (disambiguation)
- Beebe (disambiguation)
- Beebee (disambiguation)
