= BC Association of Speech Language Pathologists and Audiologists =

The British Columbia Association of Speech-Language Pathologists and Audiologists (BCASLPA) is a Canadian non-profit society that supports over 1200 speech-language pathologists, audiologists, and supportive personnel in British Columbia. BCASLPA also provides information to the public about speech and hearing disorders and treatments, and connects people who have speech, language, swallowing, and hearing disorders with highly trained speech and hearing health professionals across BC.

Members of BCASLPA have joint membership with the federal body, the Canadian Association of Speech-Language Pathologists and Audiologists (). BCASLPA is also a member of the Pan-Canadian Alliance of Speech-Language Pathology and Audiology Associations, which enables provincial associations and CASLPA to work together on common priorities.

BCASLPA is a professional association that represents and supports its members. For the regulating body, which protects the interests of the public see the College of Speech and Hearing Health Professionals of BC.

== Structure ==
BCASLPA's head office is in Vancouver, British Columbia. BCASLPA is governed by an elected board of 14 members called the Provincial Council. The Provincial Council consists of an Executive Committee (President, Vice President, Past President, Treasurer, Secretary, and Registrar), Professional Councillors (an Audiologist from private practice and public practice, and a Speech Language Pathologist from private practice and public practice), an Area Representative, an Advocacy Representative, a Member Services Representative and a CASLPA Councilor.
