= Wow (Bibi Zhou album) =

Studio album by Bibi Zhou
- Released: December 18, 2007
- Genre: Mandopop
- Label: Yuelin

Bibi Zhou chronology
Now (2007)	Wow (2007)	Time (2009)

Wow is the third studio album of Chinese singer Bibi Zhou, released on December 18, 2007.

== Track listing ==
1. "Wow" – 3:42
2. "No Rest for the Whole Year" (全年无休) – 2:41
3. "Repeat" (反复) – 3:45
4. "Just to Meet You" (为了认识你) – 3:50
5. "The Desert Can Also Find Paris" (沙漠也找到巴黎) – 4:02
6. "Silly Genius" (傻瓜的天才) – 2:54
7. "Cat's Adventure" (猫的冒险) – 4:11
8. "How" (怎样) – 3:49
9. "Oh Yes!!" – 3:13
10. "Sweat" (汗) – 4:40
