= Now (Bibi Zhou album) =

Studio album by Bibi Zhou
- Released: December 18, 2007
- Genre: Mandopop
- Label: Yuelin

Bibi Zhou chronology
Who Touched My Violin String (2006)	Now (2007)	Wow (2007)

Now is the second studio album of Chinese singer Bibi Zhou, released on December 18, 2007.

== Track listing ==
1. "Liuyang River 2008" (浏阳河2008) feat. Li Guyi – 4:05
2. "Anniversary" (一周年) – 3:59
3. "Ah Feng" (阿凤) – 3:56
4. "Believe in Love" (相信爱情) – 3:39
5. "City of Angels" (天使之城) – 4:07
6. "That Me Told Myself" (那个我对我说) – 3:42
7. "Each Other" (彼此) – 3:46
8. "How Are You" (你好吗) feat. Nicky Lee – 3:39
9. "Love Is Hard" (爱好难) – 3:47
10. "The Future Is Now" (未来就是现在) – 3:53
