= Who Touched My Violin String =

Studio album by Bibi Zhou
- Released: August 12, 2006
- Genre: Mandopop
- Label: Yuelin

Bibi Zhou chronology
Bibi (2006)	Who Touched My Violin String (2006)	Now (2007)

Who Touched My Violin String (simplified Chinese: 谁动了我的琴弦; traditional Chinese: 誰動了我的琴弦) is the first studio album of Chinese singer Bibi Zhou, released on August 12, 2006.

The album won a 9+2 Music Pioneer Award for Best Album in 2006.

== Track listing ==
1. "Phone Number" (号码) – 4:04
2. "Don’t Love Me, Like Loving a Friend" (别爱我，像爱个朋友) – 4:11
3. "Hey! Hey!" (喂！喂！) – 3:14
4. "Who Touched My Violin String" (谁动了我的琴弦) – 3:29
5. "That One That One" (那个那个) – 3:43
6. "Poisonous Mushroom" (毒蘑菇) – 3:37
7. "Silence" – 4:41
8. "Kite" (风筝) – 3:58
9. "Deserted Island" (无人岛) – 3:02
10. "The Girl with Glasses" (戴眼镜的女孩) – 4:03
