= Beebe Lake =

Beebe Lake may refer to:

- Beebe Lake (Otter Tail County, Minnesota)
- Beebe Lake (Wright County, Minnesota)
- Beebe Lake (Ithaca, New York)
