= Beeb =

Beeb or BEEB may refer to:

- BBC, the British Broadcasting Corporation, sometimes called "the Beeb" or "Auntie Beeb"
  - BEEB, a BBC children's magazine published in 1985
  - BBC Micro, a home computer built for the BBC by Acorn Computers Ltd., nicknamed "The Beeb"
  - BBC Online, the BBC's Internet operations, containing many properties titled with variations on "Beeb"
- Beeb Birtles (born 1948), Dutch-Australian musician

== See also ==
- BBC (disambiguation)
- Bebe (disambiguation)
- Beebe (disambiguation)
- Canadian singer Justin Bieber, sometimes referred to by the nickname "The Bieb"
