= Time (Bibi Zhou album) =

Studio album by Bibi Zhou
- Released: July 8, 2009
- Genre: Mandopop
- Label: Gold Typhoon

Bibi Zhou chronology
Wow (2007)	Time (2009)	I, Fish, Light, Mirror (2010)

Time is the fourth studio album of Chinese singer Bibi Zhou, released on July 8, 2009.

== Track listing ==
1. "Season" – 4:42
2. "These Words" (这句话) – 3:51
3. "Your Love" (你们的爱) – 4:34
4. "Reversed Time" (倒叙的时光) – 4:11
5. "Favor" (青睐) – 4:23
6. "An Apple Bitten by God" (上帝咬过的苹果) – 4:07
7. "Sing Half a Song" (唱一半的歌) – 3:58
8. "Learning to Feel" (学会感觉) – 3:58
9. "Sleepwalking While Awake" (醒着梦游) – 4:50
10. "Sing Out Happiness" (唱响幸福) – 3:22
