= Steven A. Beebe =

American professor of communication (born 1950)

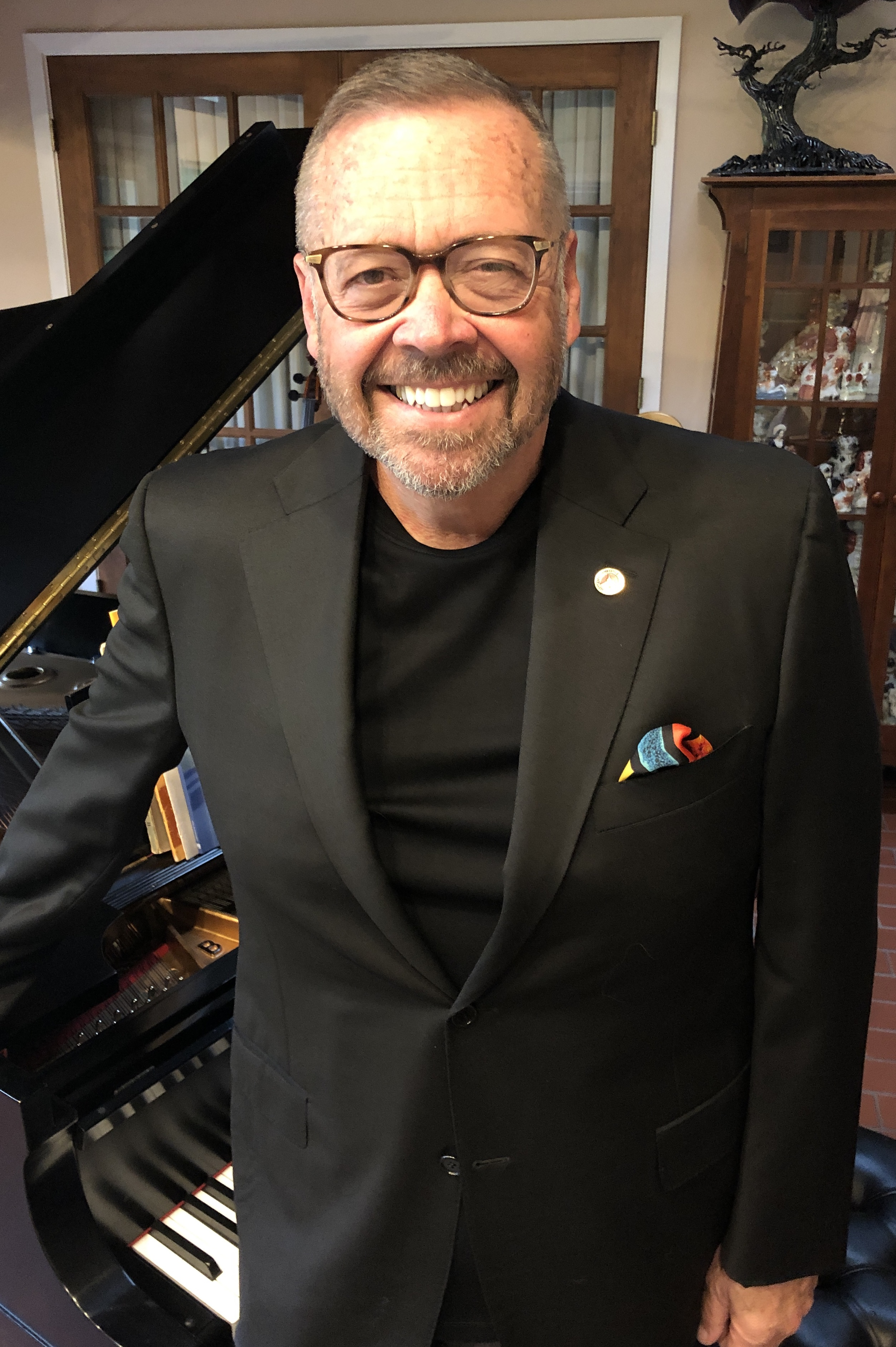
- Beebe in 2019
- Born: September 19, 1950 (age 76)
- Occupation: Communication scholar
- Spouse: Susan J. Beebe

Academic background
- Education: University of Central Missouri (BS, MA); University of Missouri (PhD)

Steven A. Beebe (born September 19, 1950) is an American professor of communication. He is a communication and C. S. Lewis scholar who discovered a fragment of an unpublished manuscript started by C.S. Lewis that was to be co-authored by J. R. R. Tolkien about communication (Language and Human Nature). Beebe is Regents' and University Distinguished Professor Emeritus of Communication Studies at Texas State University, San Marcos. Beebe has more than 75 published articles and book chapters. He is also the author or co-author of 15 books that have been used at hundreds of colleges and universities by millions of students around the world (including Canadian, Russian and Chinese editions). He is past president of the National Communication Association and played a leadership role in developing the Russian Communication Association.

== Education ==
Beebe received his undergraduate degree, B. S. in Education (1972) in Public Address with a minor in Music, and an M.A. degree (1973) in Speech Communication, from the University of Central Missouri. His Ph.D. is from the University of Missouri-Columbia (1976) in Speech Communication. In 2003, he and his wife, Susan J. Beebe, established a scholarship at their alma mater, the University of Central Missouri, for students who are also involved in the forensics program.

== Academic positions ==
Beebe retired from Texas State University in 2019 where he had been on the faculty for 33 years. Prior to joining the faculty at Texas State he was a tenured member on the Communication faculty at the University of Miami for 10 years. He was the chair of the Department of Communication Studies at Texas State University for 28 years, and served concurrently as the associate dean of the College of Fine Arts and Communication for 25 years. He is a past president of the National Communication Association (NCA) - 2013. He has been chair of NCA’s Instructional Communication Division and the Applied Communication Division. He has also served as president of the Florida Communication Association. Beebe is also a founding member of the Russian Communication Association and co-director of the first Russian Communication Association conference. Beebe has given lectures and conference presentations throughout Europe, Asia, and Central America and has made fifteen visits to Russia where he has helped to establish the first communication studies programs there.

== Honors and awards ==
Beebe was recognized as an Outstanding Communication Professor by the National Speaker's Association. Beebe has also received two highly distinguished awards from Texas State. Beebe was awarded the university's highest research award, The President’s Award for Excellence in Research, and has twice received the President’s Award for Excellence in Service. He was recognized as the Texas State University Honors Professor of the year in 2011 and received the Texas State Faculty Senate Teaching Award in 2017 and 2018. In 2018 Dr. Beebe was named Piper Professor by the Minnie Stevens Piper Foundation recognizing him as one of the top ten professors in Texas among all academic disciplines. In 2020, Steve and his wife and frequent co-author Sue, who met on their college debate team in 1970, received the “Order of Attainment” from the national debate/forensics honorary Pi Kappa Delta in 2020; previous inductees include President Lyndon B. Johnson and Governor Ann Richards. In 2024, Dr. Beebe received the Wallace A. Bacon Lifetime Teaching Excellence Award from the National Communication Association.

Additional recognition includes: Outstanding Young Men in America, Recognition by United States Jaycees, 1982 Directory of American Scholars, 1982 Professor of the Year Award, Honorable Mention, University of Miami, 1981 Recognized for Excellence in Teaching by Panhellenic Council, University of Miami, 1979. Also He was Recognized for Scholastic Achievement, University of Missouri-Columbia, 1976. Outstanding Teaching Award, University of Missouri-Columbia, 1975.

== Media appearances ==
Beebe has made various appearances, both national and international. His extensive list of appearances include Oxford University, Cambridge University, and others in Europe, Asia, Central American, and Russia. Beebe presented the inaugural lecture at the new lecture hall at the San Marcos Academy in San Marcos, Texas on October 9, 2012. His lecture focused on the C.S Lewis manuscript that he had discovered. During the lecture, Beebe emphasizes how C.S. Lewis was a master of communication through his literary works. He had several TV and radio interviews while he was in Pyatigorsk, Russia in the Northern Caucus region of Russia. Beebe was a speaker at the International Peace Conference sponsored by Pyatigorsk State Linguistic University in Pyatigorsk, Russia and presented a lecture entitled "Peace through Communication." He has also been interviewed by the BBC in Oxford, for the BBC Ireland, and has recorded several podcasts and webinars in the United States related to C. S. Lewis, including appearances at the Marion E. Wade Center at Wheaton College, "Pints with Jack," "All About Jack," the Christianity and Communication Studies Network, and several presentations to Jagannath University, Dhaka, Bangladesh and the National University of Modern Languages, Pakistan.

== C. S. Lewis ==
C. S. Lewis and J.R.R. Tolkien were planning on writing a book on language together in the 1940s, but the book was never published. Beebe discovered the opening pages of the manuscript in the Oxford University Bodleian Library written by Lewis However, there is no evidence that Tolkien worked on the project. Originally, the identification of the manuscript to what is now known as Language and Human Nature was not immediately evident to Beebe. It was some time later that he realized that the manuscript was the beginnings of the planned project between Lewis and Tolkien. Beebe relied on the help of other prominent C. S. Lewis scholars, who are familiar with Lewis' handwriting, to carefully transcribe the manuscript. Beebe taught a reoccurring summer course at Oxford titled "C.S. Lewis: Chronicles of a Master Communicator" about C. S. Lewis and communication sponsored by the Communication Studies Department at Texas State. He also taught the course as an Honors course at Texas State. In 2016 and 2019 Beebe discovered unknown and unpublished poems by C.S. Lewis in the Oxford University Bodleian library. Beebe’s book C. S. Lewis and the Craft of Communication, that also includes one of Lewis’s unpublished poems, is the culmination of his C. S. Lewis research. It was published in 2020 (Peter Lang).

== Research and publications ==
Beebe has authored or co-authored 15 books and published more than 75 articles and book chapters. In 1996, he was honored by the title of Outstanding Communication Professor in the U.S. by the National Speaker's Association. It can be noted that Beebe's research of choice is in instructional communication and his works have appeared in such journals as Communication Education, Human Communication, Communication Research Reports, and several Russian language academic journals.

One of his articles, co-authored with John Darling, titled "Effective Entrepreneurial Communication Organization Development: Achieving Excellence Based on Leadership Strategies and Values," suggests that excellence in entrepreneurial organizations focus on positive customer service, persistent innovation, leadership skills, and reliability of workers. Leadership should be communication-based.

He and his wife, Susan J. Beebe, wrote Public Speaking: An Audience-Centered Approach that has been used for Public Speaking courses at numerous colleges and universities throughout the world.

Beebe is the senior co-author of textbooks spanning many different areas of communication including business and professional communication, communication training and development, interpersonal communication, small group communication, communication fundamentals, public speaking, and family communication.

In 2002, he co-authored Interpersonal Communication: Relating to Others, which identifies the skills and principles necessary to become an effective communicator. It also includes a discussion of listening, intercultural communication, and nonverbal communication and is widely cited Beebe has co-authored 34 books and articles with Timothy P. Mottet on the topic of instructional communication.

== National Communication Association ==
The National Communication Association is a nonprofit organization with the goal of promoting the study, criticism, research, teaching, in addition to the application of the artistic, humanistic and scientific principles of communication, and is located in Washington, D.C.

Beebe was president of the National Communication Association for 2013. During Beebe's presidency in 2013, he focused on strengthening the basic course - calling the introductory communication course "the front porch" of the discipline. In addition, he spent time promoting the NCA to different countries, along with sharing the organization's current philosophy and goals. He added additional resources to NCA website about internationalizing the communication discipline. Russia became a strategic location for promoting the values of the NCA, and during multiple trips there, Beebe became a leader in establishing communication studies programs. His efforts in stressing the importance of communication education helped, in collaboration with prominent Russian educators, to establish the creation of the Russian Communication Association. Beebe received the Lifetime Achievement Award from the Training and Development Division of NCA in 2016.

== Ordained minister ==
Beebe has been an ordained lay minister in the Community of Christ since 1978. He served as pastor of the Miami, Florida congregation in the 1980s and as district president in Texas in the 1990s. He continues to provide personal ministry and serve as a wedding officiant.

== Personal life ==
Dr. Beebe has been married to his wife, co-author and partner Susan Beebe since 1974. Together they have two sons, software and technology marketing executive Mark Beebe, and middle-school Texas history teacher Matt Beebe. Steve and Sue continue to reside in San Marcos, Texas.
