= Language and Human Nature =

Unfinished work by C S Lewis and J R R Tolkien

Language and Human Nature is a joint literary project that was begun, but never completed, by C. S. Lewis and J. R. R. Tolkien.

In the 1940s a press release from Tolkien's publisher George Allen & Unwin announced that the book was to be published in 1950. However, the book was not published, and until 2009 scholars believed that the book had never been started. In 2009 Steven A. Beebe, Regents’ Professor and Chair of the Texas State University Department of Communication Studies, discovered the opening pages of the manuscript in the Bodleian Library in Oxford. Professor Beebe stated: "What is exciting is that the manuscript includes some of Lewis’s best and most precise statements about the nature of language and meaning. Both Lewis and Tolkien wrote separately about language, communication, and meaning, but they published nothing collaboratively."
