= TonleSap Airlines =

Airline of Cambodia (2011–2013)

Tonlesap Airlines Corp.
IATA	ICAO	Call sign
K9	TSP	TONLESAP AIR
- Founded: 21 January 2011
- Ceased operations: August 2013
- Hubs: Siem Reap International Airport
- Fleet size: 0
- Destinations: 12
- Headquarters: Phnom Penh, Cambodia
- Website: web.archive.org/web/20101228220929/http://www.tonlesapairlines.com/%20Official%20website

Tonlesap Airlines was an airline with its head office in Phnom Penh, Cambodia. It was a regional carrier operating a scheduled domestic network and regional flights to neighbouring countries. Its main base was Phnom Penh International Airport.

The airline made its first flight on January 21, 2011.

In August 2013, the airline appeared to be defunct.

== Destinations ==
In October 2012, TonleSap Airlines operated scheduled passenger flights to the following destinations:

- China
  - Beijing – Beijing Capital International Airport
  - Hong Kong – Hong Kong International Airport
  - Ningbo – Ningbo Lishe International Airport
  - Shanghai – Shanghai Pudong International Airport
- Cambodia
  - Siem Reap – Siem Reap International Airport - hub
- Taiwan
  - Kaohsiung - Kaohsiung International Airport
  - Taipei - Taoyuan International Airport
- Thailand
  - Pattaya – U-Tapao International Airport
- South Korea
  - Seoul – Incheon International Airport

== Fleet ==
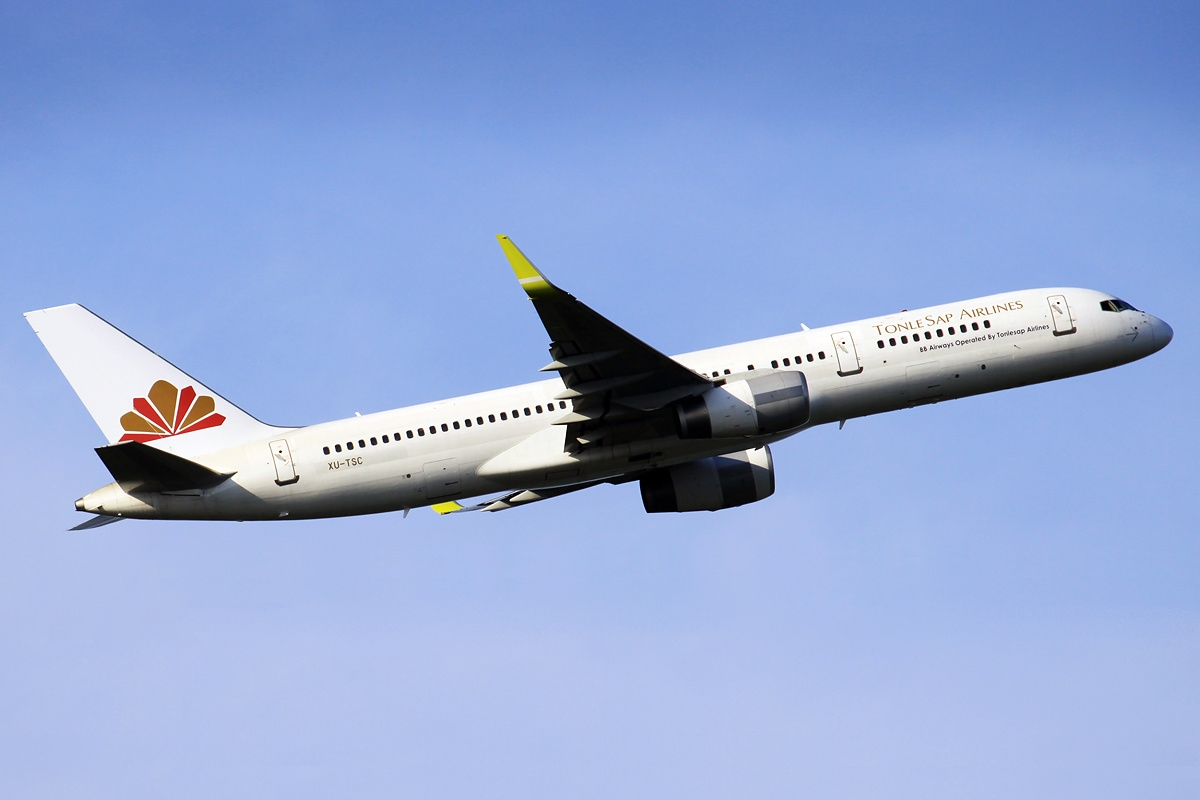
TonleSap Airlines Boeing 757

In October 2012, TonleSap Airlines had the following aircraft:

Tonlesap Airlines fleet
Aircraft	Total	Passengers (all Economy)	Notes
Boeing 757-200	2	222	Were leased from BB Airways

== Rebrand ==
After closing its doors in August of 2013, in July of 2013, the airline rebranded as Wat Phnom Airlines. The next year, the rebranded airline closed, with its final Boeing 737-400 sold to Swiftair.
