= Speech-Language and Audiology Canada =

Canadian professional organization

Speech-Language & Audiology Canada (SAC), formerly known as the Canadian Association of Speech-Language Pathologists and Audiologists (CASLPA), is a national organization supporting and representing speech-language pathologists, audiologists, and communication health assistants. The association adopted its new name and logo on February 5, 2014.

Speech-Language & Audiology Canada is a member-driven organization that supports, promotes, and elevates the professions of its more than 6,000 members and associates. Through this support, SAC champions the needs of people with communication disorders.

== Structure ==
SAC's office is in Ottawa, Ontario. The SAC Board of Directors has between 10-16 Directors who are elected by SAC's membership. The Board includes a Chair, 1st Vice-Chair, 2nd Vice-Chair, Director-University, Director-Communication Health Assistant and Director-Student.

== Publications ==
SAC publishes the Canadian Journal of Speech-Language Pathology and Audiology, an online, peer-reviewed academic journal on speech-language pathology and audiology, and SAC in Action, an advocacy newsletter, both of which are accessible by the public. SAC also has a blog, Communiqué, and three other publications (Student Speak, This Week in the News and a PD Bulletin), which are available exclusively to the association's members and associates.

== Awareness campaigns ==
=== Speech and Hearing Month ===
Each May, SAC runs Speech and Hearing Month, a nationwide public awareness campaign that raises awareness about communication disorders and the professionals who can help. In recent years, SAC's Speech and Hearing Month has highlighted the importance of the early detection and intervention of communication disorders by creating resources and partnering with children's hospitals across Canada.

=== Noisy Toys Campaign ===
SAC has worked to raise awareness of the dangerous effects of noisy toys. It has encouraged the government to conduct further studies on noise related to toy safety and revise current legislation. SAC supports legislation that advocates the reduction of allowable noise decibel levels in toys from the current 100 dB to 75 dB.

=== Auditory Processing Disorder ===
On December 13, 2012, the Canadian Interorganizational Steering Group for Audiology and Speech-Language Pathology (CISG), a consortium of professional associations, provincial regulatory bodies, and university programs released Canadian Guidelines on Auditory Processing Disorder in Children and Adults: Assessment and Intervention. The guidelines provide a framework for working with individuals with this disorder.

As a member of CISG, SAC is confident that these guidelines will shed light on APD and help ensure that this disorder is managed in a consistent way across Canada.

=== Early Hearing Detection and Intervention Campaign ===
On March 25, 2014, SAC held a press conference to draw attention to the lack of comprehensive early hearing detection and intervention (EHDI) programs across the country. In collaboration with the Canadian Academy of Audiology, Elks and Royal Purple of Canada, the Canadian Paediatric Society, and VOICE for Hearing Impaired Children, SAC released a report card rating the state of EHDI programs throughout Canada. Out of all 13 provinces and territories, only five—British Columbia, Ontario, Nova Scotia, PEI, and New Brunswick—received a passing score and British Columbia was the only province to earn an "excellent" rating.

== Provincial Associations ==
- Alberta College of Speech-Language Pathologists and Audiologists (ACSLPA)
- British Columbia Association of Speech Language Pathologists and Audiologists (BCASLPA)
- Saskatchewan Association of Speech-Language Pathologists and Audiologists (SASLPA)
- Ontario Association of Speech-Language Pathologists and Audiologists (OSLA)
- L'Association québécoise des orthophonistes et des audiologistes (AQOA)
- New Brunswick Association of Speech-Language Pathologists and Audiologists (NBASLPA)
- The Speech and Hearing Association of Nova Scotia (SHANS)
- Prince Edward Island Speech and Hearing Association (PEISHA)
- Newfoundland and Labrador Association of Speech-Language Pathologists and Audiologists (NLASLPA)
- Yukon Speech-Language Pathology and Audiology Association (YSLPAA)
- Association of Northwest Territorial Speech-Language Pathologists and Audiologists (ANTSLPA)
