= Mega Maldives =

Maldivian airline (2010–2017)

MEGA Maldives Airlines
IATA	ICAO	Call sign
LV	MEG	SANDBAR
- Founded: 23 October 2010; 15 years ago
- Commenced operations: 23 December 2010; 15 years ago
- Ceased operations: 2 May 2017; 8 years ago
- Hubs: Velana International Airport
- Fleet size: 6
- Destinations: 30
- Parent company: Mega Global Air Services (Maldives) Private Limited
- Headquarters: Malé, Maldives
- Key people: George Weinmann (CEO)
- Employees: 400 (2016)
- Website: megamaldivesair.com

MEGA Maldives Airlines was a Maldivian airline based at Ibrahim Nasir International Airport. It suspended all operations on 2 May 2017.

== History ==
Mega Maldives was awarded an AOC on 22 December 2010, and its first domestic flight was from Malé to Gan on 28 December 2010. The airline began its international operations on 21 January 2011 between Hong Kong and Gan. The airline initially operated flights between Hong Kong and Gan once every 5 days. Later, the route was changed to Hong Kong and Malé, but continued the unique every 5 day pattern. The airline also began scheduled service from Malé to Shanghai on 16 July and to Beijing 22 July 2011.

Frequencies increased since 2011 and the airline operated 4 to 5 flights a week to each of Beijing, Shanghai, and Hong Kong depending on the season. The airline also served Chongqing, Chengdu, and Hangzhou, China, as well as Incheon (Seoul), Korea, with seasonal services. The route from Hong Kong to Koror, Palau started in mid-December 2013 with twice-weekly frequencies.

The airline also provided technical services to other airlines at Malé Ibrahim Nasser International Airport including AOG support. The airline could also provide ground handling supervision and permit management services to other foreign airlines as well. The corporate headquarters of MEGA Maldives Airlines was located in Malé.

In September 2016, MEGA Maldives announced it would cut 65 of its 400 staff as well as postponing planned new routes until further notice due to the severely decreased Chinese leisure market. In the same month, the airline introduced its first Boeing 737-800 on wet-lease from Travel Service. The aircraft is part of its fleet modernization program and will be used for increased connectivity between short and medium ranged destinations, notably opening up new destinations in India and Sri Lanka.

Mega Maldives suspended all remaining operations on 12 May 2017 stating restructuring measures. Beforehand, it already significantly reduced its network down to only two Chinese destinations.

== Destinations ==
Prior to the suspension of all operations, MEGA Maldives operated scheduled and charter flights to the following destinations:

Bangladesh

- Chittagong - Shah Amanat International Airport
- Dhaka - Hazrat Shahjalal International Airport
- Sylhet - Osmani Airport

Mauritius

- Port Louis - Sir Seewoosagur Ramgoolam International Airport

Sri Lanka

- Colombo - Bandaranaike International Airport

Hong Kong SAR

- Hong Kong - Hong Kong International Airport

India

- Delhi - Indira Gandhi International Airport
- Mumbai - Chhatrapati Shivaji Maharaj International Airport

Japan

- Tokyo - Narita International Airport

South Korea

- Incheon - Seoul-Incheon International Airport

Saudi Arabia

- Dammam - King Fahd International Airport
- Jeddah - King Abdulaziz International Airport
- Medina - Prince Mohammad bin Abdulaziz International Airport
- Riyadh - King Khalid International Airport

Maldives

- Malé – Velana International Airport base
- Addu Atoll - Gan International Airport secondary base, charter

Macau

- Macau-Taipa - Macau International Airport

Malaysia

- Kuala Lumpur-Sepang - Kuala Lumpur International Airport

Oman

- Muscat - Muscat International Airport

Palau

- Koror-Airai - Roman Tmetuchl International Airport

United Arab Emirates

- Abu Dhabi - Abu Dhabi International Airport
- Dubai - Dubai International Airport

People's Republic of China

- Beijing – Beijing Capital International Airport
- Chengdu - Chengdu Shuangliu International Airport
- Chongqing - Chongqing Jiangbei International Airport
- Hangzhou – Hangzhou Xiaoshan International Airport
- Shanghai – Shanghai Pudong International Airport
- Zhengzhou – Zhengzhou Xinzheng International Airport
- Changsha – Changsha Huanghua International Airport
- Xi’an – Xi'an Xianyang International Airport

== Fleet ==
Prior to operational suspension. MEGA Maldives' fleet consisted of the following aircraft:

Aircraft	fleet
Boeing 767-300ER	4
Boeing 757-200	1
Boeing 737-800 (Leased from Travel Service)	1
