= Bebe Zeva =

American fashion blogger and model

Bebe Zeva (born May 7, 1993) is the pseudonym of Rebeccah Hershkovitz, an American fashion blogger, model, and writer.

As a child, her family moved around and lived in Miami Beach, Springfield and St. Louis before settling in Las Vegas.

Her rise to prominence came about when she modeled for the brand I Am Carles associated with the now defunct Hipster Runoff blog. She would later go on to be featured in The New York Times, Seventeen Magazine, and Teen Vogue respectively. Zeva previously contributed to the online journal Thought Catalog as well as StyleCaster and Technorazzi.

A feature-length mumblecore documentary about Zeva was released by MDMAfilms and premiered at Soho House on March 20, 2011. In the documentary, she was portrayed as a "17-year-old home-schooled fashion blogger" who "binge eats and provides insight about life, death, God, and the internet."

She runs a style blog called Fated To Be Hated, she is now based in Tel Aviv and currently works as a DJ.
