= B-flat =

B-flat or B♭ may refer to:

- B♭ (musical note)
- B♭ major
- B♭ minor
- b-flat Acoustic Music & Jazzclub, Berlin, Germany

== See also ==
- B♭ instrument
