= Bessie Bamber =

British artist

Bessie Bamber (c. 1870 – after 1910) was a British artist who specialised in paintings of domestic pets, particularly kittens and cats.

Little is reported of her life, and it is not known if Bamber was her maiden or married name. She worked in Liverpool between the 1880s and about 1910; she was reportedly born in Birkenhead.

A prolific artist who was most active between 1900 and 1910, Bessie Bamber worked in oils and specialised in painting cats, kittens and occasionally puppies. She preferred to work using stuffed animals rather than live ones. She usually painted on porcelain or opaline glass, and sometimes on a polished mahogany panel though most of her works are small in size (often about 9 inches by 6). Her works are mostly signed with a monogram "BB". There is no record of her exhibiting her paintings. There are works annotated as "in the manner of Bessie Bamber, English school", such as A Little Accident.

Bamber's works remain popular as sale items over a century after they were made, often reaching thousands of pounds at auction. A picture of three kittens with a pile of books was sold for £2,468 by Bonhams in 2004.

== Works ==
- A Little Accident
- The Mischief Makers
- Mischievous Kittens
- Three Kittens
- c. 1910 Pekingese on Pillow
