= BB Airways =

Nepalese airline

IATA	ICAO	Call sign
BO	BBW	BEEBEE AIRWAYS
- Founded: January 2012
- Commenced operations: 13 September 2012
- Hubs: Tribhuvan International Airport
- Fleet size: 1
- Destinations: 3
- Headquarters: Sinamangal, Kathmandu, Nepal
- Key people: Bhaban Bhatta; Shisheer Bhatta (Managing Director)
- Website: www.bbairways.com

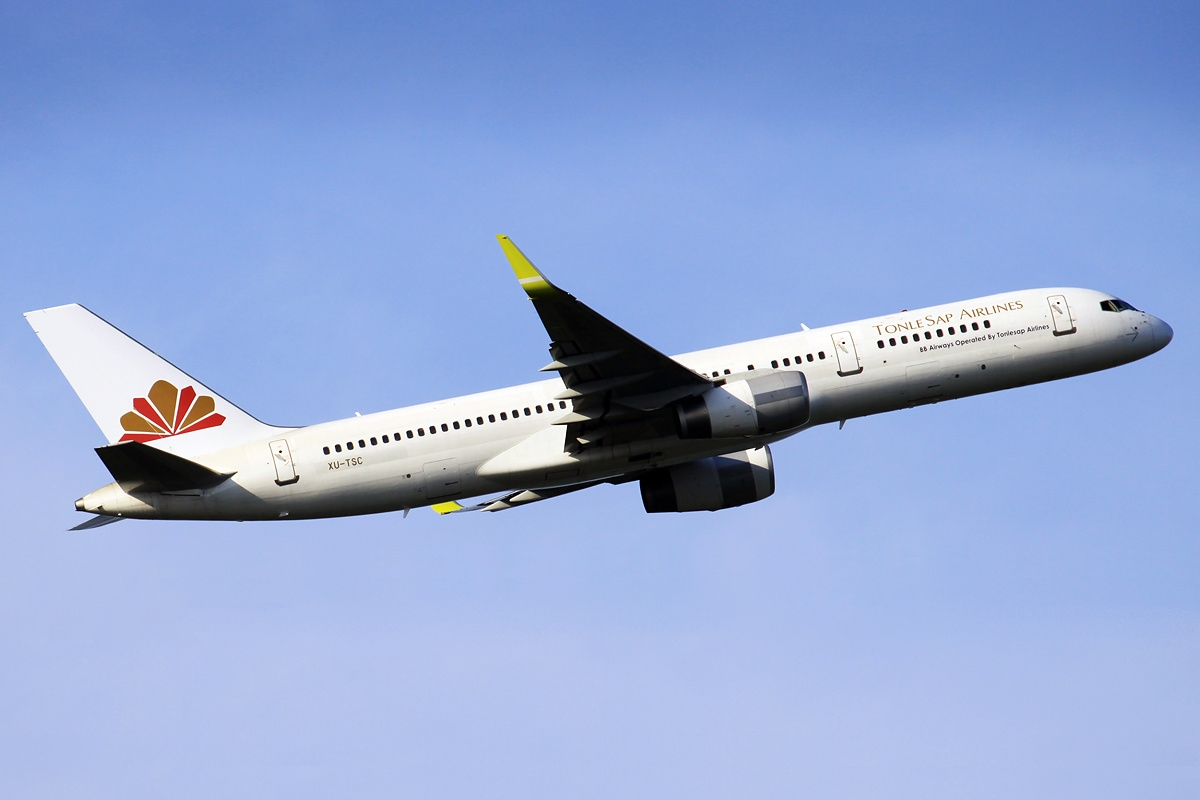
BB Airways' leased Boeing 757. Note the Tag at the front of the aircraft: "BB Airways operated by Tonlesap Airlines"

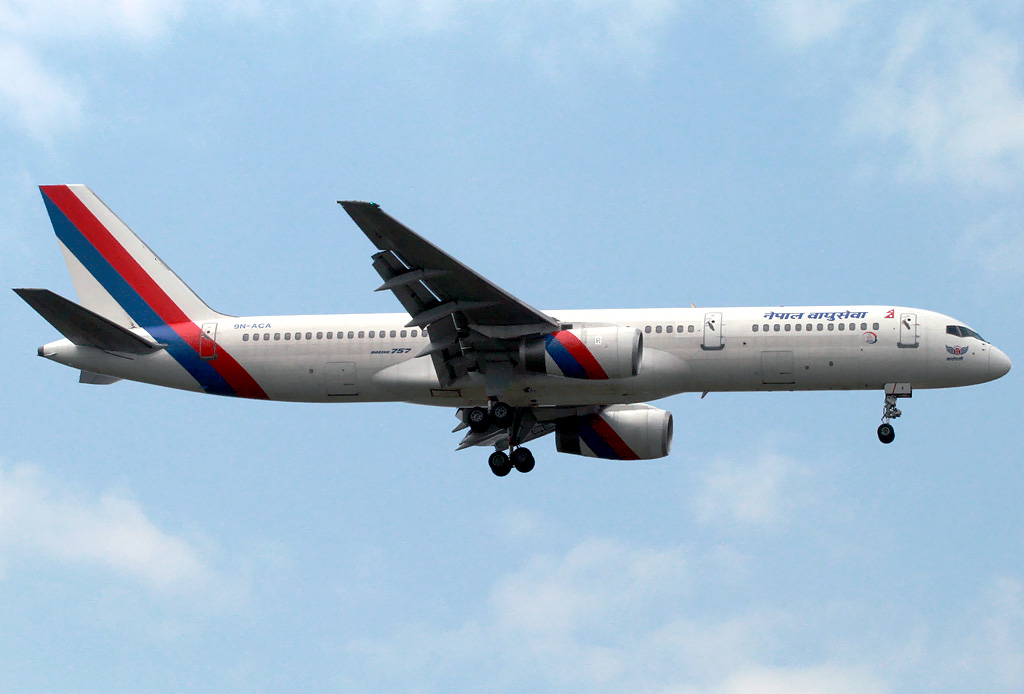
BB Airways acquired this Boeing 757 from Nepal Airlines in 2017 but never operated it until its sale in 2019.

BB Airways was a Nepalese airline based in Kathmandu, Nepal. It was established and started operations in September 2012. The airline's hub was Tribhuvan International Airport, from where it flew to three international destinations. The airline made its first flight on 13 October 2012 to Kuala Lumpur. The Japanese investment company TBI Group supported the airline, which was managed and promoted by the Non Resident Nepali Association.

== History ==
BB Airways received its Air Operator Certificate on 12 April 2012 allowing operations to seven international destinations from Nepal: Kuala Lumpur, Bangkok, Hong Kong, Singapore, Doha, Delhi and Tokyo. It started scheduled services from October 2012, but had to cease operations again several months later, as the leasing contract ran out.

In April 2013, the airline tried to restart its scheduled services by leasing two Airbus A320s. On 30 March 2014, while still operating no active aircraft, BB Airways signed a Memorandum of Understanding with MEGA Maldives Airlines in which the two carriers agreed to "collaborate on developing flights and sharing of resources".

In 2017, BB Airways purchased a three decades old Boeing 757 from Nepal Airlines, with which it was planning to use to restart operations on the route Kathmandu-New Delhi. However, the Civil Aviation Authority of Nepal abstained from issuing an Air operator's certificate arguing that it would take at least one and half year to get a permit to restart its flight operation.

In July 2019, the airline sold their sole Boeing 757.

In 2024, news surfaced that the airline was trying to restart operations.

== Destinations ==
BB Airways operated from Tribhuvan International Airport to two destinations in Asia:

Country	City	IATA	ICAO	Airport	Notes	Refs.
Hong Kong	Hong Kong	HKG	VHHH	Hong Kong International Airport		
Malaysia	Kuala Lumpur	KUL	WMKK	Kuala Lumpur International Airport		
Nepal	Kathmandu	KTM	VNKT	Tribhuvan International Airport	Hub	

== Fleet ==
=== Current fleet ===
As of October 2020, BB Airways does not possess or operate any planes.

=== Former fleet ===
BB Airways Fleet
Aircraft	Total	Notes
Boeing 757-200	2	1 leased from TonleSap Airlines in 2012/13; 1 acquired from Nepal Airlines in October 2017, sold in 2019
