= Beebe Estate =

Historic house in Massachusetts, United States

- U.S. National Register of Historic Places
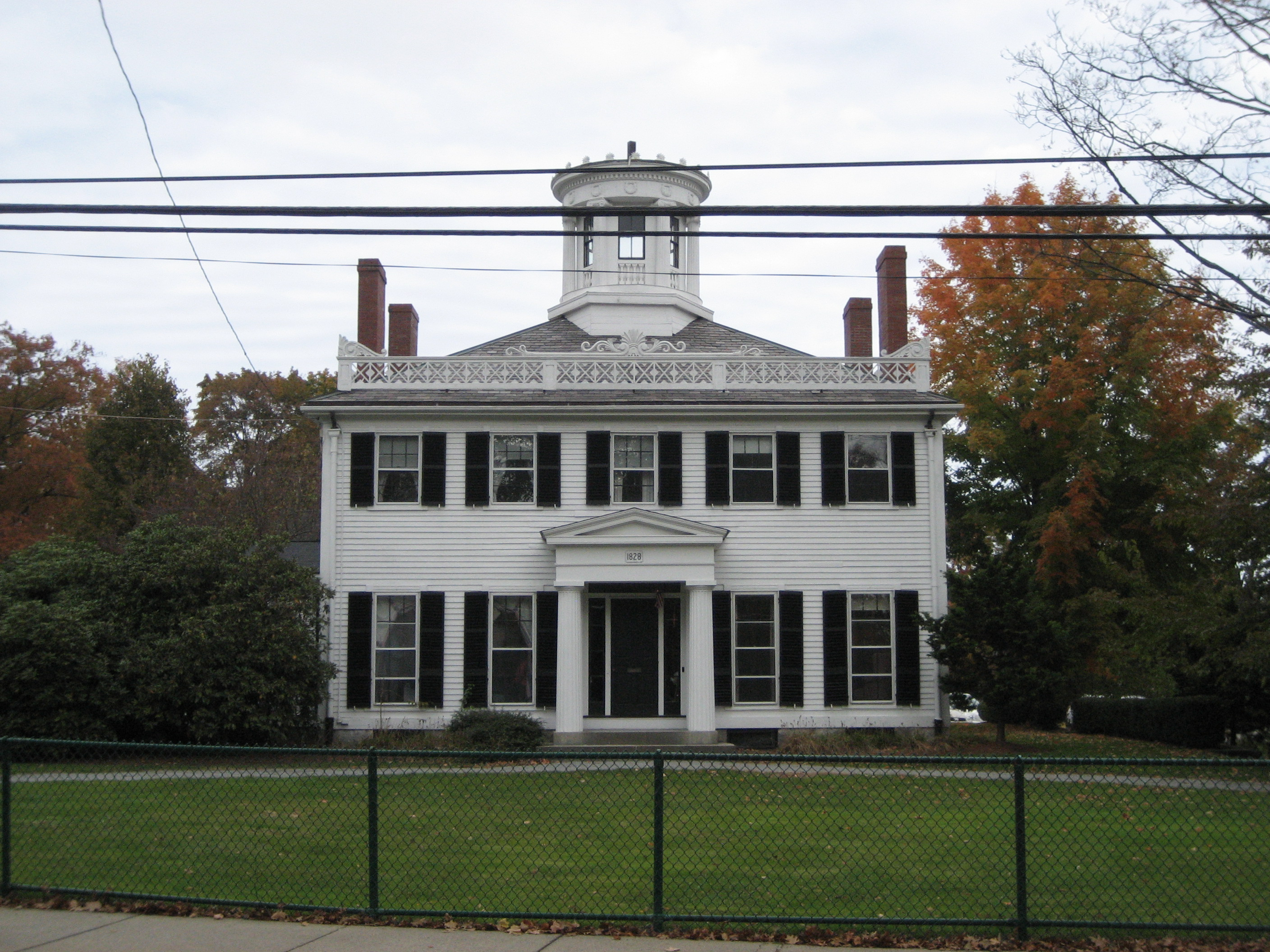

- Location within Massachusetts Location within the United States
- Location: 235 W. Foster St., Melrose, Massachusetts
- Coordinates: 42°27′20″N 71°4′13″W
- Area: 1.75 acres (0.71 ha)
- Built: 1828
- Architectural style: Greek Revival
- NRHP reference No.: 81000116
- Added to NRHP: May 20, 1981

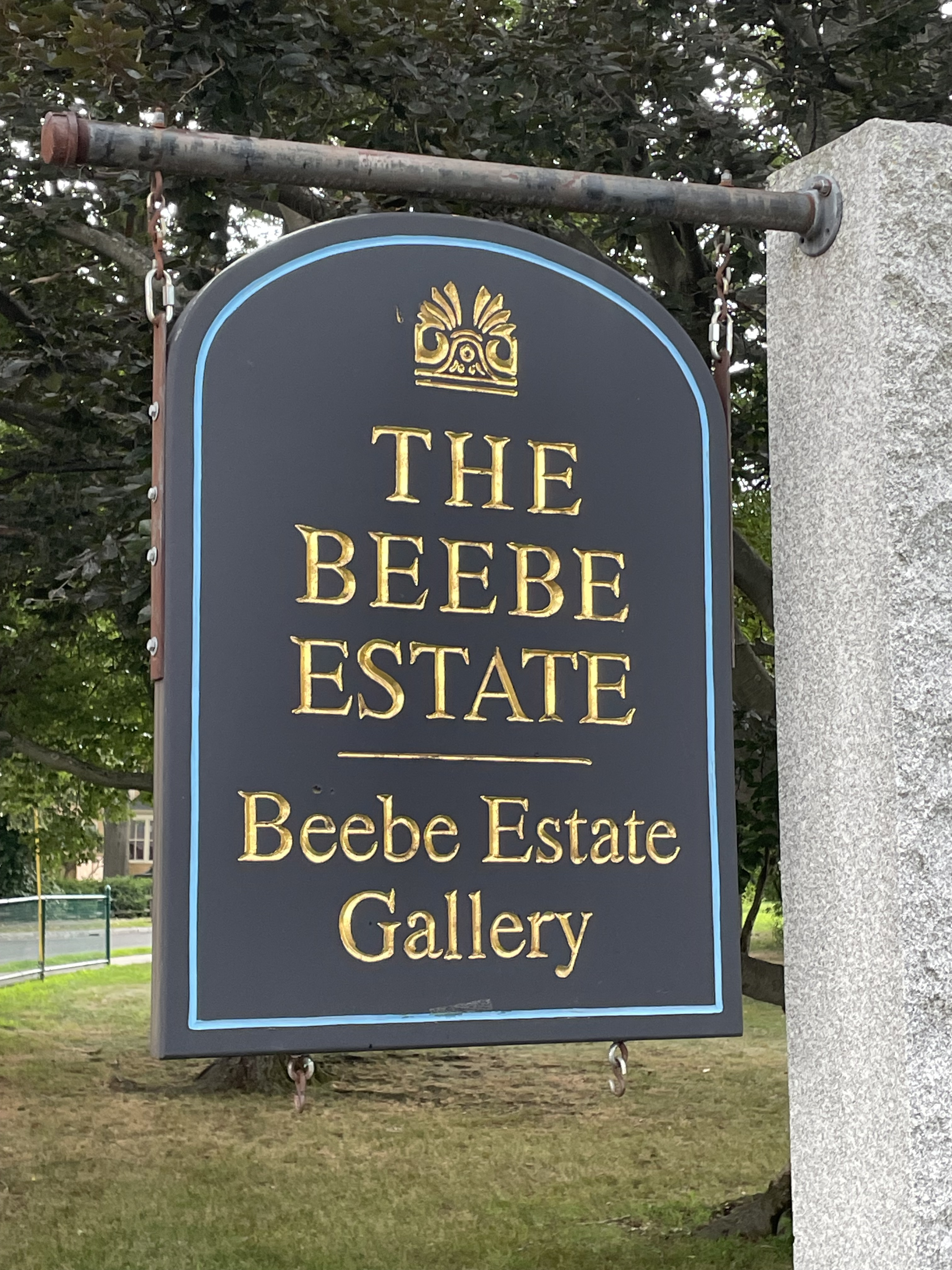
Beebe Estate & Gallery Sign

The Beebe Estate is a historic property in Melrose, Massachusetts. Developed in 1828, the main house is a prominent example of Greek Revival architecture, with an ownership history of prominent local and Boston businessmen. Now owned by the city, it is used as an art gallery and cultural event center. The estate was listed on the National Register of Historic Places in 1981.

== Description and history ==
The Beebe Estate is located a short way west of downtown Melrose, on the north side of West Foster Street, just west of the railroad tracks and east of the Beebe School. The two story building is a sophisticated expression of Greek Revival architecture, with corner pilasters, and a front entry portico with fluted Doric columns and a gabled pediment. A railing surrounds the hip roof, which has a cupola at its center. The design of the cupola is based on the Choragic Monument of Lysicrates at the Acropolis of Athens.

The house was built in 1828 by William Foster, a Boston merchant, as a summer house, and was owned from 1854 to 1963 by members of the Bigelow and Beebe families. Both of these families included prominent businessmen, active in railroads and banking. The last owners, the Beebes, gave the property to the city in 1963. After serving for a time as school administrative offices, it now operates the house as a cultural center for the display of local art on Saturdays, which are sponsored by the Beebe Estate Association. The renovated front rooms are available for rental and are used for special events.

== See also ==
- National Register of Historic Places listings in Middlesex County, Massachusetts
