= William Sully Beebe =

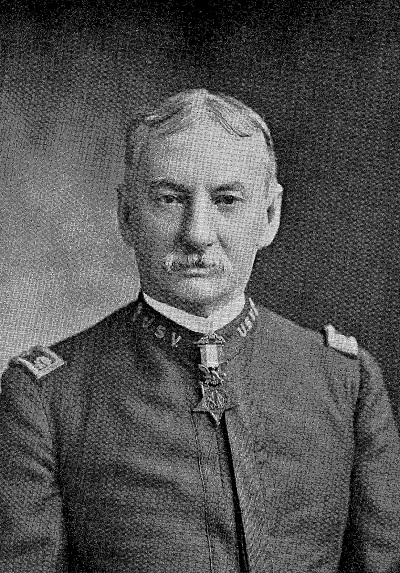
- William Sullivan Beebe
- Born: February 14, 1841; Ithaca, New York
- Died: October 12, 1898 (aged 57); Havana, Cuba
- Burial place: West Point Cemetery
- Military career
- Allegiance: United States
- Branch: United States Army
- Service years: 1863–1874, 1898
- Rank: Major
- Conflicts: American Civil War; Spanish–American War
- Awards: Medal of Honor

William Sullivan "Sully" Beebe (February 14, 1841 – October 12, 1898) was a Union officer who received the Medal of Honor on June 30, 1897 for his action at Cane River Crossing, Louisiana on April 23, 1864. Born in Ithaca, New York, Beebe graduated from West Point in 1863, receiving his commission in the ordnance branch. He served in the Army until resigning in January 1874.

Beebe rejoined the Army at the start of the Spanish–American War in June 1898, and served as chief ordnance officer, with the rank of major, on the staff of general James F. Wade. He contracted yellow fever while in Cuba and died later that year.

Beebe was a companion of the New York Commandery of the Military Order of the Loyal Legion of the United States.

Beebe was the nephew of John Charles Casey (1809–1856), West Point Class of 1829.

== Medal of Honor citation ==
Voluntarily led a successful assault on a fortified position.

== See also ==
- List of Medal of Honor recipients
