= Minnie Mason Beebe =

American academic

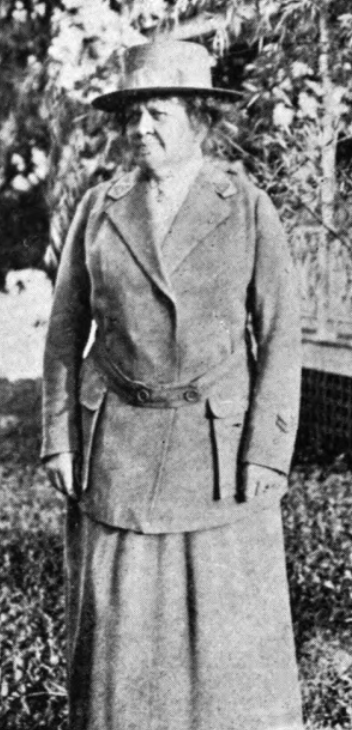
- Minnie Mason Beebe, from a 1921 publication
- Born: Minnie Adell Mason; 1865; Pavilion, New York, U.S.
- Died: August 15, 1955 (aged 89–90)
- Occupation: College professor

Minnie A. Mason Beebe (August 30, 1865 – August 15, 1955) was an American college professor and writer. She taught history and French at Syracuse University from 1900 to 1937.

== Early life and education ==
Mason was born in Pavilion, New York, the daughter of Wallace W. Mason and Mary Elizabeth Ward Mason. She graduated from Geneseo Normal School. She earned a bachelor's degree from Syracuse University in 1890, and a master's degree in 1893. She was a member of the Gamma Phi Beta sorority and the Phi Beta Kappa honor society. She earned a Ph.D. in history the University of Zurich in 1900, with a dissertation in German, and became a fluent French speaker during her time in Europe.

== Career ==
Beebe taught English literature at Wyoming Seminary in Pennsylvania from 1891 to 1898. From 1900 to 1937, she taught history and French at Syracuse University. At Syracuse she organized an interdenominational and co-educational Sunday school class, called Kolledj Klan, which lasted from 1907 to 1946. During World War I, she took a leave of absence and spent 14 months in France, using her language skills to work for the YMCA in Aix-les-Bains.

== Publications ==
- A French Grammar for Schools and Colleges (1911)
- The American Soldiers’ Souvenir of Aix les Bains (1919)
- "William Howard Taft and Phi Kappa Phi" (1930)

== Personal life ==
Minnie Mason married pastor Theodore Orville Beebe in August 1890; he died about six months later, in February 1891. She died in 1955, at the age of 89, in Syracuse. A local newspaper paid tribute to her as "one of the nation's great teachers" and "a woman brimming with spirit and devotion to the cause of education." Her journals are in the Syracuse University Archives.
