= Bibi Zhou =

Chinese singer-songwriter (born 1985)

- 周笔畅
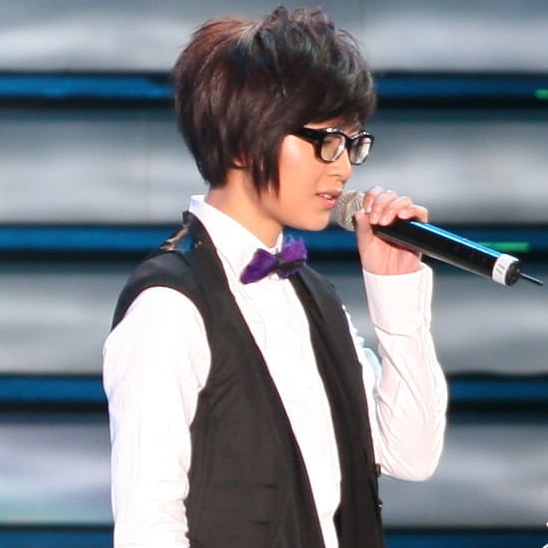
- Zhou in 2008
- Born: 26 July 1985 (age 41); Changsha, Hunan, China
- Education: Xinghai Conservatory of Music
- Occupations: Singer-songwriter; musician
- Years active: 2006–present

Chinese name
- Traditional Chinese: 周筆暢
- Simplified Chinese: 周笔畅
Transcriptions
Standard Mandarin
- Hanyu Pinyin: Zhōu Bǐchàng
Yue: Cantonese
- Jyutping: Chau1 Bat1 Cheung3
- Musical career
- Genres: Pop; R&B
- Labels: EE Media; Yuelin; Gold Typhoon; Yuehua

Zhou Bichang (simplified Chinese: 周笔畅; traditional Chinese: 周筆暢; pinyin: Zhōu Bǐchàng; born 26 July 1985), also known as Bibi Zhou, is a Chinese singer, songwriter, and musician. She debuted her singing career by winning the second place at the Chinese singing contest Super Girl in 2005. The next year she released her debut album Who Touched My Violin String. She debuted her acting career by featuring in the 2006 Chinese films McDull, the Alumni and The 601st Phone Call. In 2014, she won an MTV Europe Music Award for Best Worldwide Act. In 2015, she won a Nickelodeon Kids' Choice Award for Favorite Chinese Act.

== Life and career ==
=== 1985–2005: Early years and career beginnings ===
Zhou was born to her parents Zhou Zhongzhan and Lu Yuanyuan in Changsha, Hunan on 26 July 1985. Her father was a government agent, while her mother was a Chinese folk music teacher. At the age of six, she and her family moved to Shenzhen, Guangdong, China. She attended Yuanling Elementary School, Gangxia Elementary School, Fuhua Elementary School, and Futian High School. In 2002, she majored in non-classical music at the Xinghai Conservatory of Music in Guangzhou, Guangdong, China. In the same year, she released a song titled "How I Miss You" on the internet. In 2005, she took part in the Chinese singing contest Super Girl, and eventually won second place at the contest.

=== 2006–2007: Who Touched My Violin String ===
In March 2006, Zhou signed a recording deal with Chinese record label Yuelin Music. At the same time, she released her first studio single titled "Swan", which was included in her first extended play titled Bibi released in June 2006. The extended play was followed by her debut studio album titled Who Touched My Violin String released in August 2006. In the same year, she featured in two Chinese films, McDull, the Alumni and The 601st Phone Call. In March 2007, she attended the Encore Program at the Musicians Institute in Los Angeles, California, United States to take singing classes.

=== 2007–2008: Now and Wow ===
After she finished her courses at Musicians Institute, Zhou returned to China and prepared for her next studio album. In the same year, she also graduated from Xinghai Conservatory of Music with a bachelor's degree. In December 2007, she released two studio albums Now and Wow at the same time. In April 2008, she featured in the theme song "Beijing Welcomes You" for the 100-day countdown of the 2008 Summer Olympics. In the same month, she joined the public benefit campaign 56 Ethnic Groups, One Dream as a young ambassador along with Hong Kong singer and professional swimmer Alex Fong.

=== 2009–2012: Time, I, Fish, Light, Mirror, and Black Apple ===
In January 2009, Zhou signed a recording deal with Gold Typhoon. In July 2009, she released her fourth studio album Time. The album was released in mainland China as well as Taiwan. In June 2010, she released her fifth studio album I, Fish, Light, Mirror. The album topped the album sales chart for one week in Taiwan. In May 2011, she launched a fashion brand Begins with Lin Zijun and Cheng Yang. In November 2011, she released her sixth studio album Black Apple.

=== 2013: Unlock ===
In October 2012, Zhou signed a recording deal with Yuehua Entertainment, and opened her own studio at the same time. In May 2013, she released her seventh studio album Unlock. She also embarked a concert tour titled Unlock Tour. In early 2014, she appeared on the Chinese singing competition I Am a Singer (season 2). In November 2014, she won an MTV Europe Music Award for Best Worldwide Act. That same year, she was internally selected by CCTV to represent China in the ABU TV Song Festival 2014, with the song "I miss you missing me". In January 2015, she held a public benefit concert Begins to Love Concert. In March 2015, she won a Nickelodeon Kids' Choice Award for Favorite Chinese Act. That year, she released the album "Rolling my eyes", which was published initially in two EPs and later released as a whole.

=== 2015–present: Rolling My Eyes, Not Typical, Renamed, Lunar ===
2018: Vocal judge on The Next Top Bang with other celebrities like Victoria Song and Kris Wu. 2021: Zhou participates on Sisters Who Make Waves season 2.

== Discography ==
=== Studio albums ===
- Bibi (EP) (2006)
- Who Touched My Violin String (2006)
- Now (2007)
- Wow (2007)
- Time (2009)
- I, Fish, Light, Mirror (2010)
- Black • Choose • White (2011)
- Unlock (2013)
- Rolling My Eyes (2015) – album released as 3-part EP
- Not Typical (2017)
- Lunar (2019)
- Slime (EP) (2020)
- Dating Oneself (EP) (一个人的约会) (2023)
- HAVE A NICE DAY (2024)
- HAVE A GOOD NIGHT (2024)

=== Compilation albums ===
- The Best Of Bibi Chou 2009–2013 (2013)

=== Remix albums ===
- Renamed (Remix Album) (2018)

== Filmography ==
- McDull, the Alumni (2006)
- The 601st Phone Call (2006)
- V Love (2014)
- Cold War 2 (2016)
