= B&B =

B&B may refer to:

== Common uses ==
- Bed and breakfast, a type of accommodation for travellers

== Arts, entertainment, and media ==
=== Television ===
- B&B (TV series), an English children's television show
- B-And-B, a 1968 British sitcom
- Beavis and Butt-head, an animated television series
- The B&B, an EastEnders spin-off
- The Bold and the Beautiful, an American soap opera
- Bujji and Bhairava, a 2024 Indian sci-fi TV series, part of The Kalki Cinematic Universe

=== Other uses in arts, entertainment, and media ===
- B&B Enterprises, the real estate development company founded by Stringer Bell for the Barksdale Organization, on The Wire
- Beerbongs & Bentleys, an album by Post Malone
- Bunnies & Burrows, a role-playing game

== Brands and enterprises ==
- B&B Hotels, a French hotel chain
- B&B Theatres, a midwest cinema chain
- Bradford & Bingley, a former British bank, now in public ownership

== Other uses ==
- B and B, a liqueur composed of Bénédictine blended with brandy
- Branch and bound, a search algorithm
