= Bibi (EP) =

EP by Bibi Zhou
- Released: June 1, 2006
- Genre: Mandopop
- Label: Yuelin

Bibi Zhou chronology
Bibi (2006)	Who Touched My Violin String (2006)

Bibi is the first EP of Chinese singer Bibi Zhou, released on June 1, 2006.

The song "Only Me left" won a TVB8 Mandarin Music on Demand Award for Top 10 Songs of the Year in 2006.

== Track listing ==
1. "Only Me Left" (只剩我一个) – 3:10
2. "Uh…" (呃...) – 3:53
3. "Doesn't Hurt" (不痛) – 4:13
4. "Swan" (天鹅) – 3:23
