= Bibi (artist) =

French artist

Bibi (born 23 February 1964 in Tours, France) is a French artist. His civil name is Fabrice Cahoreau. He is living and working in the South of France. He is known for his art installations in urban spaces using everyday plastic objects.

== Artistic style ==
Since 1992, by using daily life objects made of plastic, Bibi searches for the hidden forms – animal or anthropomorphous – which the designers of these objects had in the back of their minds. Light has proved particularly helpful in revealing those forms to him. As such, in order to give plastic the place it deserves - namely the 6th element – he has fought against two universally distributed icons : the polyethylene container and the traffic cone. His universe is inspired by Jacques Yves Bruel, Niki de Saint Phalle, Malcolm McLaren, Norman McLaren, Dieric Bouts, the Ancient Egypt and Les Wampas.

Bibi has performed hundreds of art installations and performances in public spaces (Moscow, Sydney, Singapore, Wirksworth (UK), Paris, Lyon, Bordeaux, Nîmes, Avignon) : the squat facade 59 rue de Rivoli in Paris with an evolutive installation from 2001 to 2004, The Fish Ball exhibited in Docks 76 in Rouen since 2009 and The Fish Fountain (Festival of Lights of Lyon, Place des Jacobins, Lyon 2008).

In 2001, he creates the MEEA (Movement for the Extermination of Endangered Animals) and tackles hunting with derision. In 2010, he designs The Bibigloo (contraction of Bibi and igloo). The Bibigloo is both a work of land art, design, light source and a plastic art installation.

== Installations ==
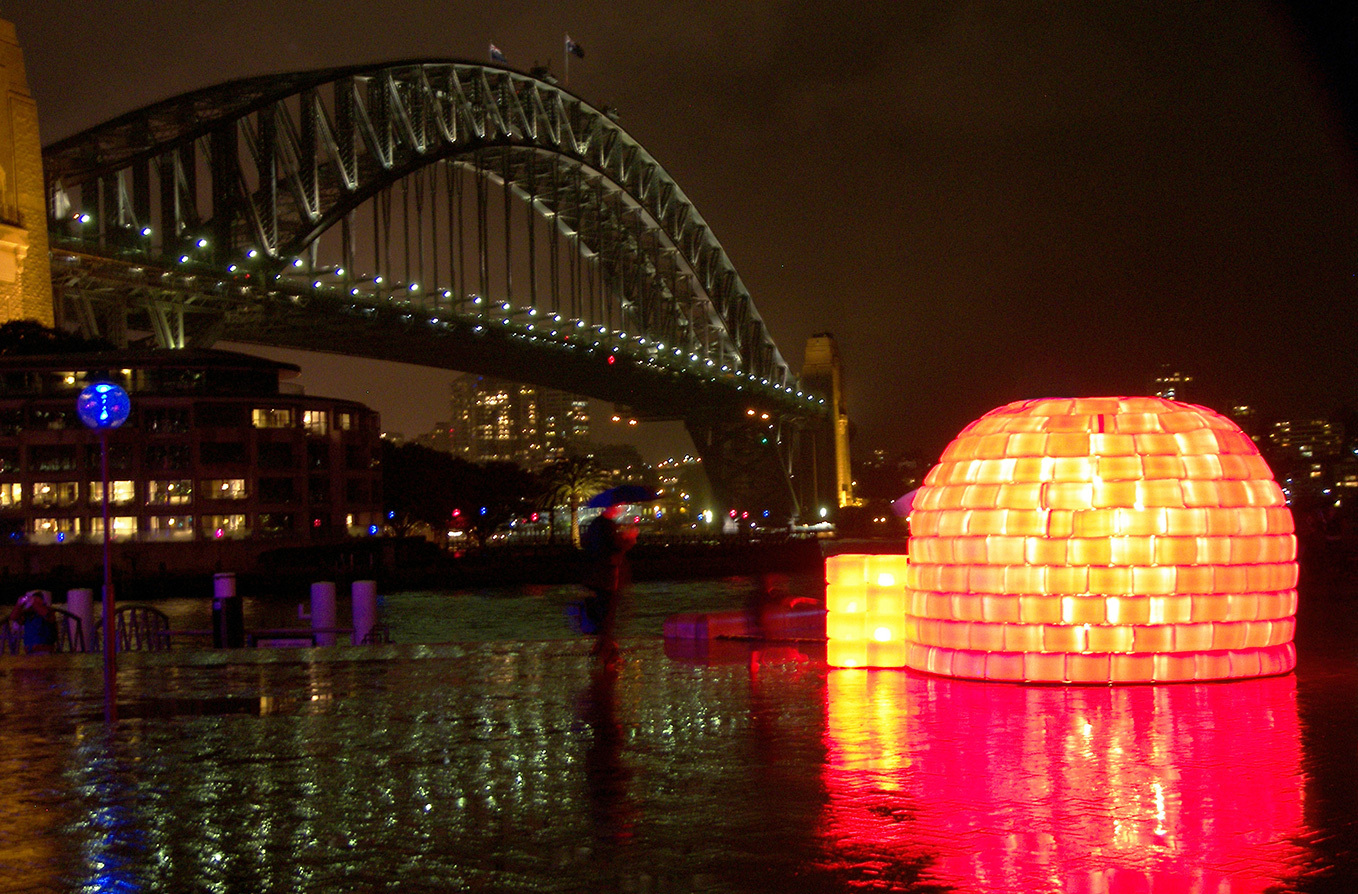
The BIBIGLOO in Sydney for the Vivid Sydney Festival in 2012.

- « Red Elephant », Festival of Lights, Lyon, France, December 2016
- « GREENPIGS », Amsterdam Light Festival, Amsterdam, Netherlands, December 2016
- « Kill them all ! », Mostra de Mende, Mende, France, April 2016
- « Georges, the Fountain Dragon », Parcours contemporain, Fontenay-le-Comte, France, September 2015
- « The Bibigloo » and « Fish Forest », Light in Jerusalem, Jerusalem, June 2015
- « The Bibigloo », Circle of Light, Moscow, Russia, October 2013
- « Happy Croco », Ilight Marina Bay Festival, Singapore, March 2014
- « The Dragon King », Dubai Light Festival, Dubai, United Arab Emirates, March 2014 et
- « The Bibigloo », Lumina Festival, Cascais, Portugal, September 2013
- « BIBI's Hell, it's here ! », Arbre en Lumière, Geneva, Switzerland, December 2012
- « The Dragon King », Fêtes des Lumières, Lyon, December 2012
- « The Bibigloo », Vivid Sydney Festival, Australia, May 2012
- « Kill the all ! », Galerie Socles et Cimaises, Nancy, France, February 2012
- « The Bibigloo », Ilight Marina Bay Festival, Singapore, March 2012
- « The Cry of Mosquitoes », Tour de la Poudrière, remparts d'Aigues-Mortes, France, from July to October 2011. During the Festival « Monuments et Animaux » organised by Monuments Nationaux.
- « The Fish Tree », facade of Scholl of the Arts (SOTA), Night Lights Festival, Singapore Art Museum, Singapore, August 2011
- « La Fontaine aux Poissons », place des Jacobins, Fête des Lumières, Lyon, December 2008
- « BIBI's Hell, it's here ! », Villeneuve-lès-Maguelone, September 2004
