= Wat Phnom Airlines =

Wat Phnom Airlines ក្រុមហ៊ុនអាកាសចរណ៍វត្តភ្នំ 金邊國際航空
IATA	ICAO	Call sign
WD	WPH	N/A
- Founded: 2013 (as TonleSap Airlines)
- Commenced operations: 10 July 2013
- Ceased operations: 2014
- Hubs: Siem Reap International Airport
- Fleet size: 1
- Destinations: 3
- Headquarters: Phnom Penh, Cambodia
- Website: www.watphnomairlines.com

Wat Phnom Airlines (Khmer: ក្រុមហ៊ុនអាកាសចរណ៍វត្តភ្នំ) was a charter airline based in Siem Reap, Cambodia.

== History ==
Wat Phnom Airlines was founded in 2013 as a result of a rebranding of failed airline TonleSap Airlines. The airline took its maiden flight on 10 July 2013 between Siem Reap in Cambodia and Taoyuan in Taiwan.

The airline ceased operations in 2014.

== Destinations ==
Wat Phnom Airlines served the following destinations:

^{[Base]}	Base

City	Country	IATA	ICAO	Airport
Kaohsiung	Taiwan	KHH	RCKH	Kaohsiung International Airport
Siem Reap	Cambodia	REP	VDSR	Siem Reap-Angkor International Airport ^{[Base]}
Taipei	Taiwan	TPE	RCTP	Taiwan Taoyuan International Airport

== Fleet ==
Wat Phnom Airline operated the following aircraft during operations:

Wat Phnom Airlines fleet
Aircraft	In fleet	Passengers	Notes
Boeing 737-400	1	165	All economy configuration

The aircraft was later sold to Swiftair, a Spanish airline and converted into a freighter which crashed in 2024.
