= Marcus Beebe House =

Historic house in South Dakota, United States

- U.S. National Register of Historic Places
- Location within South Dakota Location within the United States
- Location: 4th St. and 5th Ave., Ipswich, South Dakota
- Coordinates: 45°26′56″N 99°01′45″W
- Area: 1 acre (0.40 ha)
- Built: 1910
- Architect: Henry, J.W.
- Architectural style: Classical Revival, Queen Anne
- NRHP reference No.: 76001733
- Added to NRHP: December 12, 1976

The Marcus Beebe House, in Ipswich, South Dakota, is a historic house built in 1910. It was listed on the National Register of Historic Places in 1976.

It was designed by architect J.W. Henry. It is a two-and-a-half-story house built in a combination of Queen Anne and Classical Revival styles. Its two-story entrance portico originally included four Ionic columns, but had one column replaced by a square brick pillar and lost the capital off another.
