= Bibi Amtus Salam =

Social worker and disciple of Mohandas Gandhi

- Died: 29 September 1985
- Occupation: Social worker
- Known for: Disciple of Mahatma Gandhi

Bibi Amtus Salam (died 29 September 1985) was a social worker and disciple of Mohandas Gandhi who played an active role in combating communal violence in the wake of the Partition of India and in the rehabilitation of refugees who came to India following partition.

== Early life ==
Bibi Amtus Salam was born the daughter of Abdul Majid Khan and belonged to a conservative but aristocratic Muslim family of Patiala. She was denied an education owing to the family's observance of purdah which she shunned in 1925.

== Gandhi's associate ==
Bibi Amtus Salam was a close associate of Gandhi's and he saw and addressed her as his daughter. Writing to Sardar Patel in 1934, Gandhi noted that the frail Salam's "heart is gold, but her body is brass". Salam was an advocate of Hindu-Muslim amity and channeled her efforts to attaining that goal.

In 1947, as riots occurred throughout India, Gandhi toured Bengal to try to calm tempers. Amtus Salam accompanied him on that trip and fasted with him for 21 days at Noakhali to bring peace there. Gandhi left her there to continue with the efforts of re-establishing communal harmony in Noakhali and later observed that "you are the moving spirit behind whatever peace has been achieved in Noakhali. It was and still is your most significant work. Only you can sustain it. Wherever you stand, you stand in the capacity of my daughter, do you not?"

Amtus Salam had wanted to stay in Patiala during the Partition and its accompanying violence, as a young and single Muslim woman, to further the cause of communal harmony. She opted to stay on India even as her brothers and most of her extended family chose to move to Pakistan and their action both dismayed and angered her. Gandhi arranged for their safe passage to West Pakistan.

In his India Wins Freedom, Maulana Azad notes that Mohammed Ali Jinnah's title of Quaid-e-Azam (Great Leader) was first popularised by Gandhi who had followed Amtus Salam's suggestion that he address Jinnah thus since the Urdu press referred to him by that title. Azad writes that in following Salam's advice without considering the consequences of his letter, which was published in the newspapers, Gandhi ended up legitimizing Jinnah's image as the Quaid before Indian Muslims.

== Life in independent India ==
During 1947-48, she worked on the evacuation and rehabilitation of thousands of women kidnapped during the melee that followed Partition. Here she was assisted by Lajjawati Hooja, a member of the Congress and the All-India Women's Congress and Salam made several trips to Pakistan to help with the evacuation of refugees.

She established the Kasturba Seva Mandir and settled down in Rajpura where she worked on the resettlement of Hindu migrants from Bahawalpur. When the Government of India began constructing a township at Rajpura for the rehabilitation of refugees, she was involved in the work there along with the Hindustani Talimi Sangh who worked on the education of the children in the refugee camps.

In the 1980s, Amtus Salam served as a permanent invitee on the All India Committee on Jail Reforms. She died in September 1985.
