= Bebe Bryans =

American rowing coach

Current position
- Title: Head coach
- Team: University of Wisconsin–Madison

Coaching career (HC unless noted)
- 1988-1992: Mills College
- 1992-1997: Georgetown University
- 1997-2004: Michigan State University
- 2004–2023: University of Wisconsin–Madison

Bebe Bryans (born 1957) is a United States national champion in rowing and former coach of the United States Women's National Rowing crew. She is best known as the head coach of the women's rowing team at University of Wisconsin–Madison. She is the head coach of the women's rowing program including lightweight although she doesn't directly coach that squad. The Wisconsin lightweight crew has won four national championships in five years.

A California native, Bryans attended San Francisco State University where she was a ten-time Division II All-American in swimming, and received a master's degree in Physical Education in 1989. In 1992 and 1993, Bryans was the head coach of the USA Junior Women's National Rowing Team. Her 1992 women's eight crew earned a bronze medal - the first medal won for the United States team at a World Rowing Junior Championships. Bryan was also a member of the United States Women's Olympic Rowing committee (1992–94), acting as chairman from 1993 to 1994. In 2000, she coached the U.S. women's four and the lightweight single rowing crews at the World Rowing Championships. She founded the women's varsity rowing team at Michigan State University in 1997 and coached them to six consecutive appearances at the NCAA championships.

Bryans stepped down as the head of the Wisconsin women's rowing team on May 20, 2023.
