= Lucius Beebe Memorial Library =

Library in Wakefield, Massachusetts, U.S.

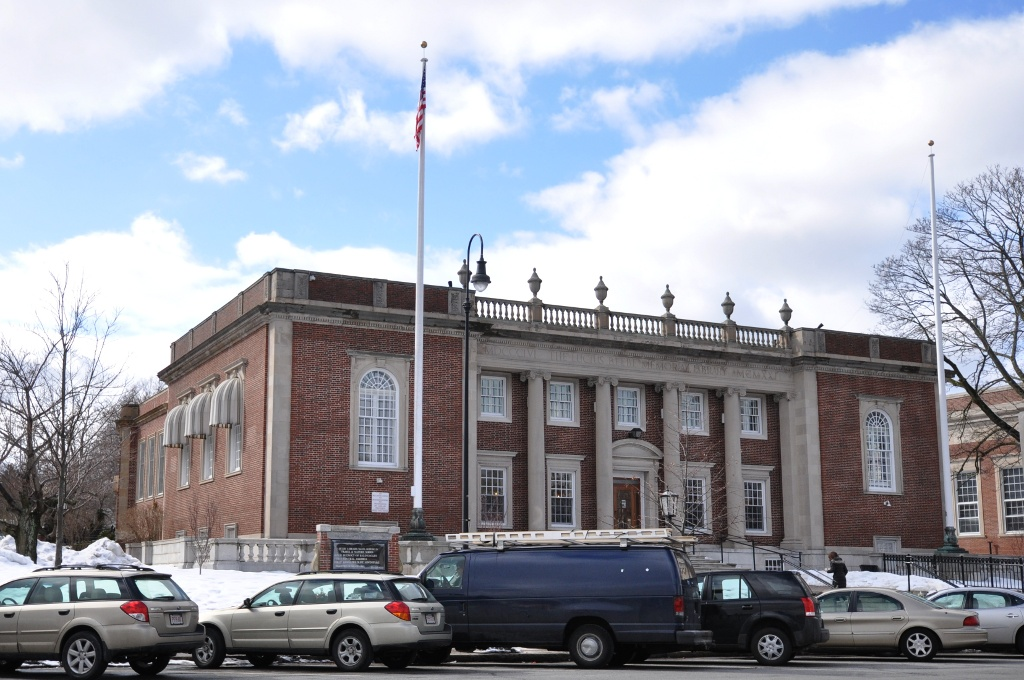
The library in 2013

The Lucius Beebe Memorial Library is the library for the town of Wakefield, Massachusetts. The building that currently holds the town's main library was opened in 1923 and is named after the first library commissioner.

== History ==
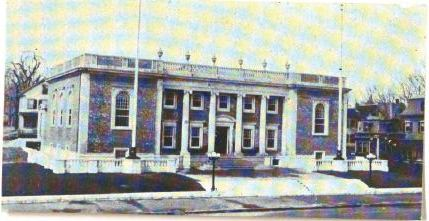
Lucius Beebe Memorial Library when it was completed.

Originally, the town of Wakefield, Massachusetts, was named South Reading. Its first library was called the Social Library, which was organized in the early part of the nineteenth century as a subscription library. The library's collection consisted mostly of theological works. This library was not very successful and many subscribers soon withdrew their support. In 1831, the South Reading Franklin Library opened and this subscription library consisted mostly of books on art, science, history, and medicine. In 1834, these two libraries merged and retained the name of Franklin Library.

In March 1856, the town approved the creation of a public library to be supported by local taxation. A committee was appointed and by the summer of 1856, the public library opened on the first floor of the old Town House. The library circulated 4,135 books the first six months it was opened. In 1857, the town sought to expand the library and appointed Lucius Beebe as chair of the library committee. This committee received an appropriation of $300 to purchase books and pay the salary of the librarian. By 1859, the library had grown to 1,678 volumes. The first librarian was noted as a Miss E.M. Newhall who was replaced in 1859 by Mrs. Emily C. Poland who served until 1866.

In 1868, Cyrus Wakefield, the namesake of the future town, donated a house to be used by the city. One-half of the first floor of this building was dedicated as the new library space. Lucius Beebe donated $500 to the library and, as a result, the town renamed the library as the "Beebe Public Library."

In 1871, a new town hall was built and the town was renamed Wakefield. Several months later the library was moved to the new Wakefield town hall. The library continued to rapidly grow and by 1900 the library board sought funding for a new building. After many failed attempts, a committee met in 1916 to buy land for a new library building in the downtown district. The committee agreed to buy land on the corner of Main and Avon Streets. The residents raised $12,000 for the land in a civic campaign. In December 1916, Junius Beebe, the son of the late Lucius Beebe, donated $60,000 for the construction of the library building. Construction was delayed, however, by the entry of the country into World War I. Construction did begin eventually in 1922 after the cornerstone was laid and was completed and opened on April 15, 1923.

== The Building ==
The building is constructed in the neo-classical style. It was originally described as New England colonial with Georgian influence built in the Greek style. There is also a large reading room adorned with medallions that pay homage to literary giants such as Homer, Cicero, Shakespeare, and Ralph Waldo Emerson. The medallions were constructed by Bennidetto Chippolini.

== Programs and Opportunities ==
The Beebe Library offers both virtual and in-person programs for both adults and children, including book clubs, story times, and craft activities.
