= Beebe Homestead =

Historic house in Massachusetts, United States

- Beebe Homestead, circa 1810
- U.S. National Register of Historic Places
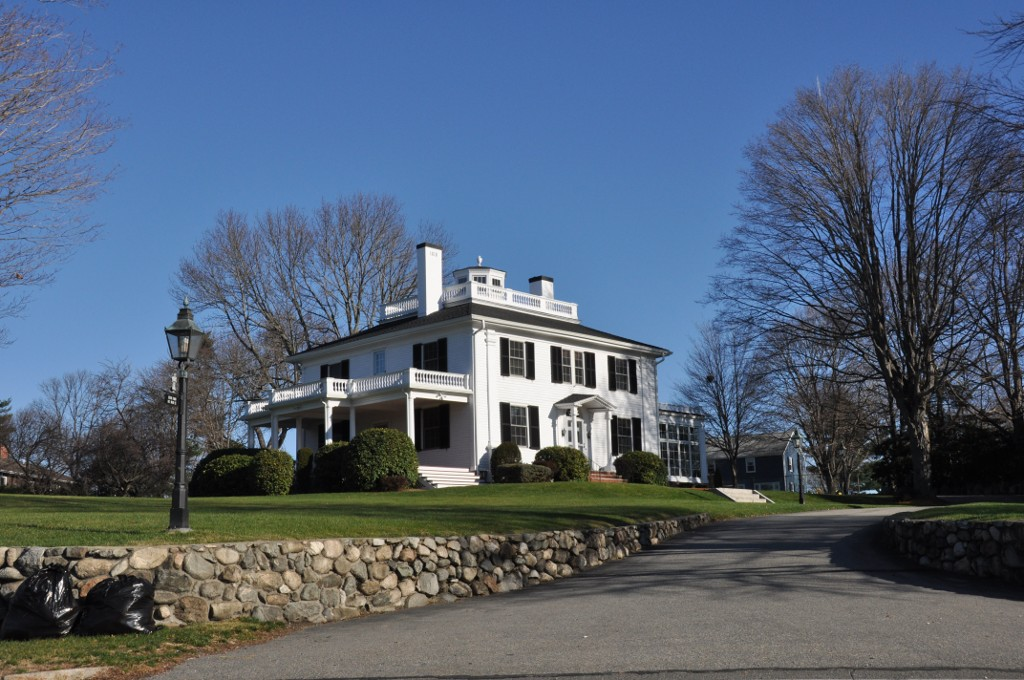

- Location within Massachusetts Location within the United States
- Location: 142 Main St., Wakefield, Massachusetts
- Coordinates: 42°31′1″N 71°4′28″W
- Architect: Clement/McIntire
- Architectural style: Federal
- MPS: Wakefield MRA
- NRHP reference No.: 89000667
- Added to NRHP: July 6, 1989

Beebe Homestead, also known as the Lucius Beebe House and Beebe Farm, is a historic Federal period home at 142 Main Street in Wakefield, Massachusetts, which was built during the federal era that extended from the late 18th-century into the 1820s. It is suspected to have been remodeled into the federal style from an earlier home built in circa 1727. It overlooks Lake Quannapowitt, and according to a 1989 study of historic sites in Wakefield, the house is "one of Wakefield's most imposing landmarks." The property was added to the National Register of Historic Places in 1989.

Lilley Eaton's, Genealological History Of The Town Of Reading, Mass., claims the property first settled in 1644 by Nicholas Brown, one of Redding's (old spelling) first settlers. Records of the Town of Redding, 1639-1812, indicate 90 acres acquired by Nicholas Brown from Edward Taylor in 1639. Nicholas Brown was one of a handful of settlers receiving land patents and migrating westward from Lynn, MA.

The property remained in the Brown family until it was sold by General Benjamin Brown in 1798 for $3,000. While a Colonel in the Continental Army, Benjamin Brown served under General Horatio Gates at Fort Ticonderoga in 1776, a seat of war during the American Revolution. Acquiring the home from Brown, was Capt. Thomas Clement, Sr., architect and housewright of Boston and previous naval commander. Eaton's genealogy described Clement as having “improved the establishment, erecting new buildings and raising the culture of the land.” Prior to this, Capt. Clement was listed as a Boston, Milk St. resident with a notable affiliation. Clement was a founder and trustee of the Massachusetts Charitable Mechanic Association along with Paul Revere, its first president in 1795. This organization of master mechanics of different trades was set up to regulate apprenticeship requirements and provide death benefits to its membership. He remained a trustee until 1798 when he removed to South Reading, now Wakefield. The property was then conveyed by deed to Thomas Clement Jr., merchant of Boston, in 1810.

Research conducted by Historic New England, previously SPNEA (Society for the Preservation of New England Antiquities), date the structure in the late 18th to early 19th centuries; this partly based on hand-hewn framing and brick nogging (18th-century insulation) within the walls. These and other facts likely attribute the home's construction within Thomas Clement Sr.’s era (1798-1810).

In 1814 the property was then acquired by John Derby, Esq. of Salem, for $6,000. A member of the prominent Derby family of Salem and believed to be among the first millionaires in America, John Derby purchased the home for his daughter. In 1815, as part of the Elias Hasket Derby mansion demolition, Derby moved this McIntire summerhouse to the Main St. location where it remained until it was donated back to the Peabody Essex Museum by Dr. Frederick Marmo in 1978. Samuel McIntire, a prominent architect, woodcarver, and furniture maker during the federal period, was commissioned by the Derby family for many projects and his possible involvement in the property prior to the Derby purchase has been the source of much speculation, furthered by an Oct., 1939 article in House & Garden, entitled “Lucius Beebe’s Family Home.”

After a brief period, Derby sold the property to Thomas Haley Forrester of Salem in 1819 for $6,500. Colonel Forrester was a feisty war veteran and rum imbiber who had a reputation for cutting up the drawing room furniture with his rapier when retelling accounts of past military campaigns.

Thereafter, the property changed hands several times until it was purchased by Lucius Beebe in 1852 for $10,000. A titan in the business world, Beebe's interests extended into cotton, leather, lumber, real estate, and banking. By 1870 Lucius Beebe had acquired over 230 properties in Middlesex County alone by way of direct conveyance and through the Wakefield Real Estate & Building Association to which he was president. He also founded what is now the Santander Bank in Wakefield known previously as the Wakefield Trust Company and National Bank of South Reading. His family is believed to have had involvement in this and other area banks well into the 20th century. As a result of his generosity and that of his son, Junius Beebe, the Wakefield town library still bears the name: Lucius Beebe Memorial Library. Author, journalist, and syndicated columnist, Lucius Morris Beebe, was the son of Junius, and also grew up on the farm.

Architecturally, the home contains many classical elements characteristic of the federal period. Frontal Pilasters adorn the exterior, along with a broken pediment portico with well defined entablature. Interior embellishments, leading one to think McIntire, include triple-carved balusters, and an elliptical archway supported by fluted pilasters and topped with an “S” scroll keystone. However, further analysis by the SPNEA, coupled with Chelsea tile facings (1878–1907) and other Victorian elements on several of the upstairs chimney pieces, reveals a major renovation of the late 19th century presumably inspired by Junius Beebe and a knowledgeable architect.

== See also ==
- National Register of Historic Places listings in Wakefield, Massachusetts
- National Register of Historic Places listings in Middlesex County, Massachusetts
