= Herman K. Beebe =

American banker

Herman K. Beebe was a Louisiana financier who was convicted of fraud in 1988 during the savings and loan crisis.
