= Beebe House (Platteville, Wisconsin) =

Historic house in Wisconsin, United States

- U.S. National Register of Historic Places
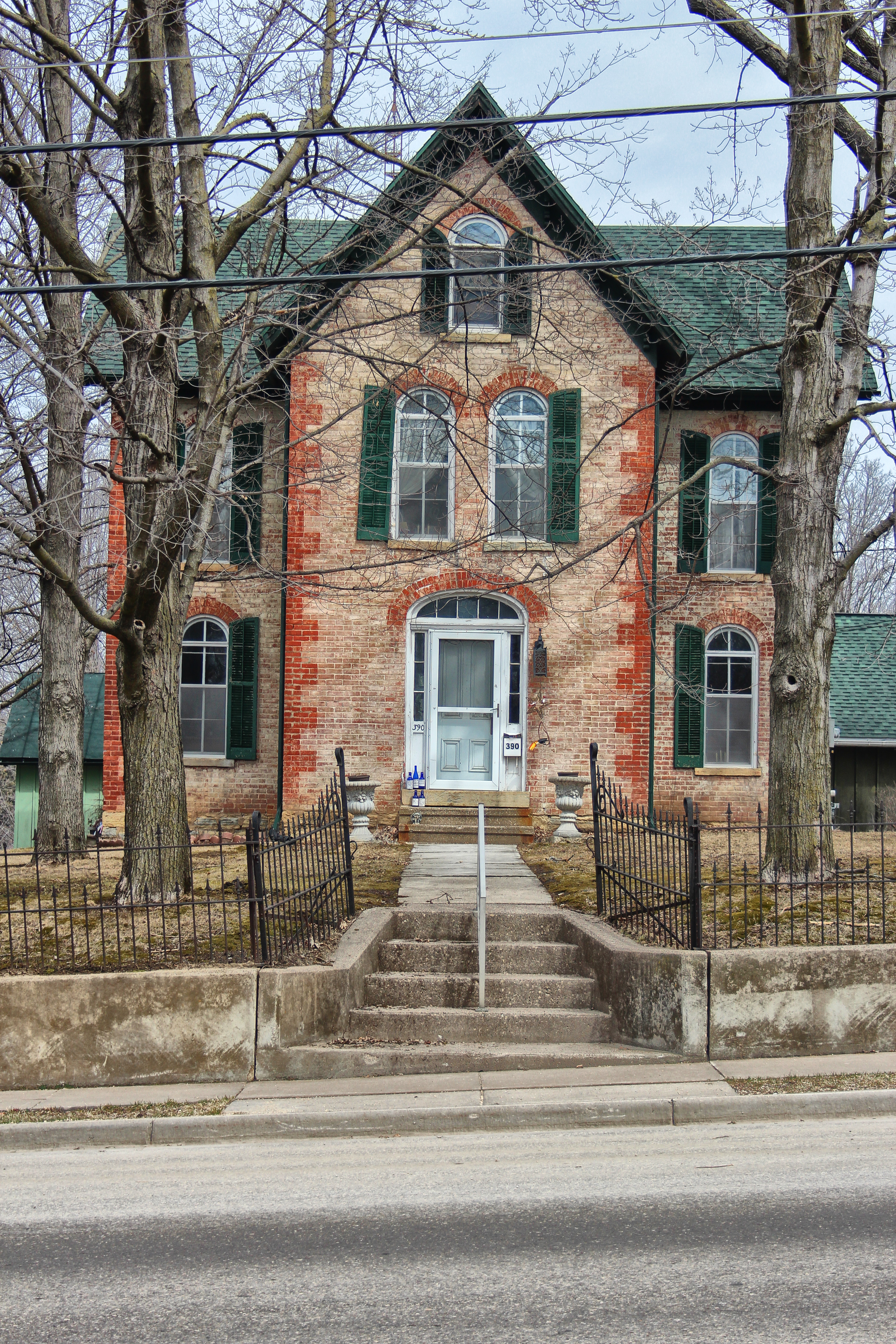
- Beebe House

- Location within Wisconsin
- Location: 390 W. Adams St., Platteville, Wisconsin
- Coordinates: 42°44′19″N 90°28′49″W
- Area: 0.3 acres (0.12 ha)
- Built: 1870
- Architectural style: Gothic Revival
- NRHP reference No.: 79000078
- Added to NRHP: August 7, 1979

The Beebe House is a historic house at 390 W. Adams Street in Platteville, Wisconsin.

== History ==
The house's first owner, William Beebe, served in the Union Army during the American Civil War, reaching the rank of captain. Beebe became a lawyer after the war, and he built his house in Platteville in 1870. He would later become mayor of Platteville and the district attorney and justice of the peace for Grant County. Beebe's house has a Victorian Gothic design, a style not commonly used in southwest Wisconsin. The two-story brick house features a cross-gabled layout and roof, red brick quoins, tall arched windows, and bracketed boards in the eaves of the gable ends.

The house was added to the National Register of Historic Places on August 7, 1979.
