= Beebe Lake (Wright County, Minnesota) =

Lake in the state of Minnesota, United States

- Location within Minnesota
- Location: Wright County, Minnesota
- Coordinates: 45°10′25″N 93°44′37″W
- Type: Lake
- Surface elevation: 965 feet (294 m)

Beebe Lake is a lake located in Wright County, in the U.S. state of Minnesota.

Named after an early settler, Beebe Lake covers an area of 323 acres and reaches a depth of approximately 27 feet at its deepest point.

== See also ==
- List of lakes in Minnesota
