= BeBee =

Social network

beBee
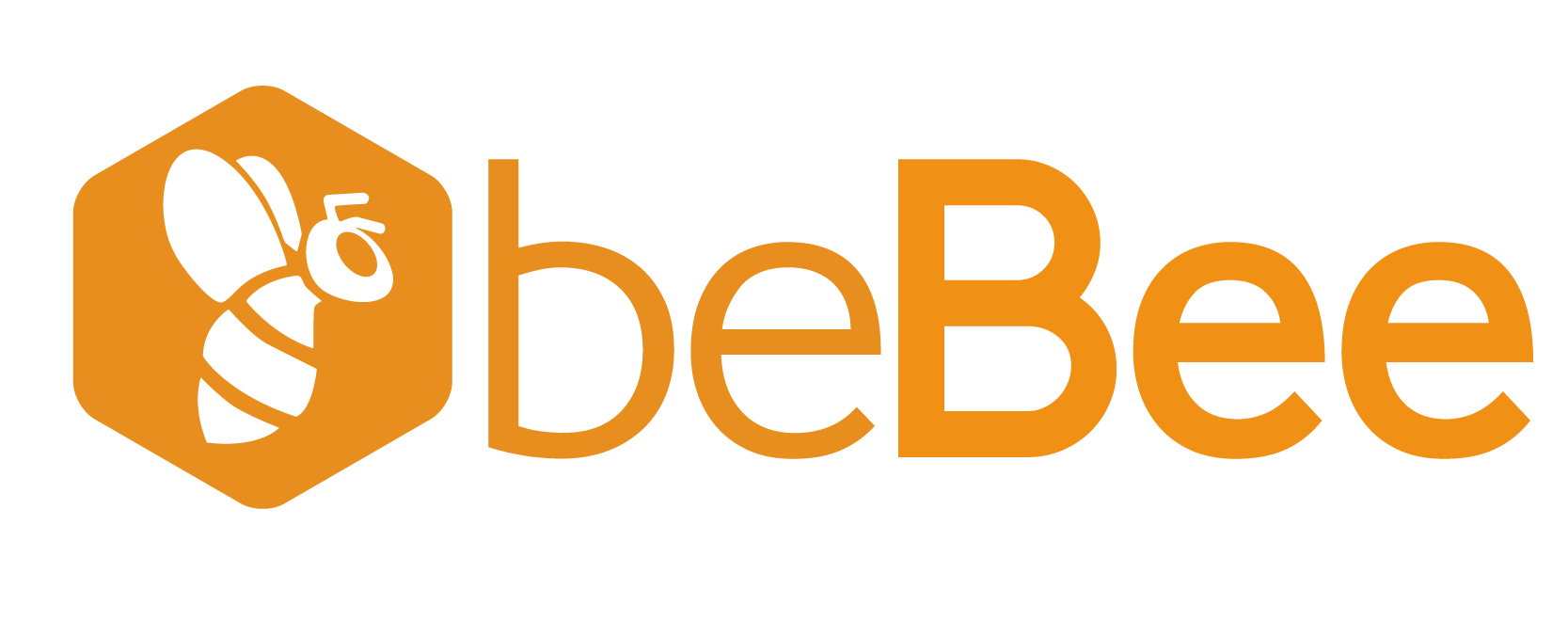
- Type: Privately held company
- Industry: Internet
- Founded: March 3, 2020; 6 years ago
- Founders: Javier Cámara-Rica, Rafael García-Romano and Juan Imaz
- Website: www.bebee.com

beBee is a self-described business and employment-oriented online service that operates via a website. The platform allows businesses to post jobs and users to post their CVs and interests. The website also incorporates microblogging and social aspects. However, numerous people reported problems with the functionality of the page, hidden charges and other financial issues, as well as a lack of reachability, leading to an overwhelmingly negative aggregate score at trustpilot.

The startup was established in February 2015, and originally launched in English, Spanish and Portuguese.
