= Canadian Journal of Speech-Language Pathology and Audiology =

Academic journal

- Discipline: Speech-language pathology, audiology
- Language: English, French
- Edited by: David H. McFarland, PhD

Publication details
- Former names: Human Communication, Journal of Speech-Language Pathology and Audiology
- History: 1973-present
- Publisher: Speech-Language & Audiology Canada (Canada)
- Open access: Yes

Standard abbreviations
- ISO 4: Can. J. Speech-Lang. Pathol. Audiol.

Indexing
- ISSN: 1913-200X
- OCLC no.: 315069928

Links
- Journal homepage; Online access; Online archive

The Canadian Journal of Speech-Language Pathology and Audiology (CJSLPA) / Revue canadienne d'orthophonie et d'audiologie (RCOA) is a peer-reviewed, online journal of clinical practice for audiologists, speech-language pathologists and researchers. It is published by Speech-Language & Audiology Canada.

CJSLPA is an open access journal, with all articles available on the internet immediately upon publication. The journal does not charge publication or processing fees.

The purpose of CJSLPA is to disseminate current knowledge pertaining to hearing, balance and vestibular function, feeding/swallowing, speech, language and social communication across the lifespan. It is not restricted to a particular age or diagnostic group.

The journal was established in 1973 as Human Communication. It was renamed to Human Communication Canada in 1983 and then to the Journal of Speech-Language Pathology and Audiology in 1990 before obtaining its current title in 2007.

== See also ==
- Open access in Canada
