= C. S. Lewis bibliography =

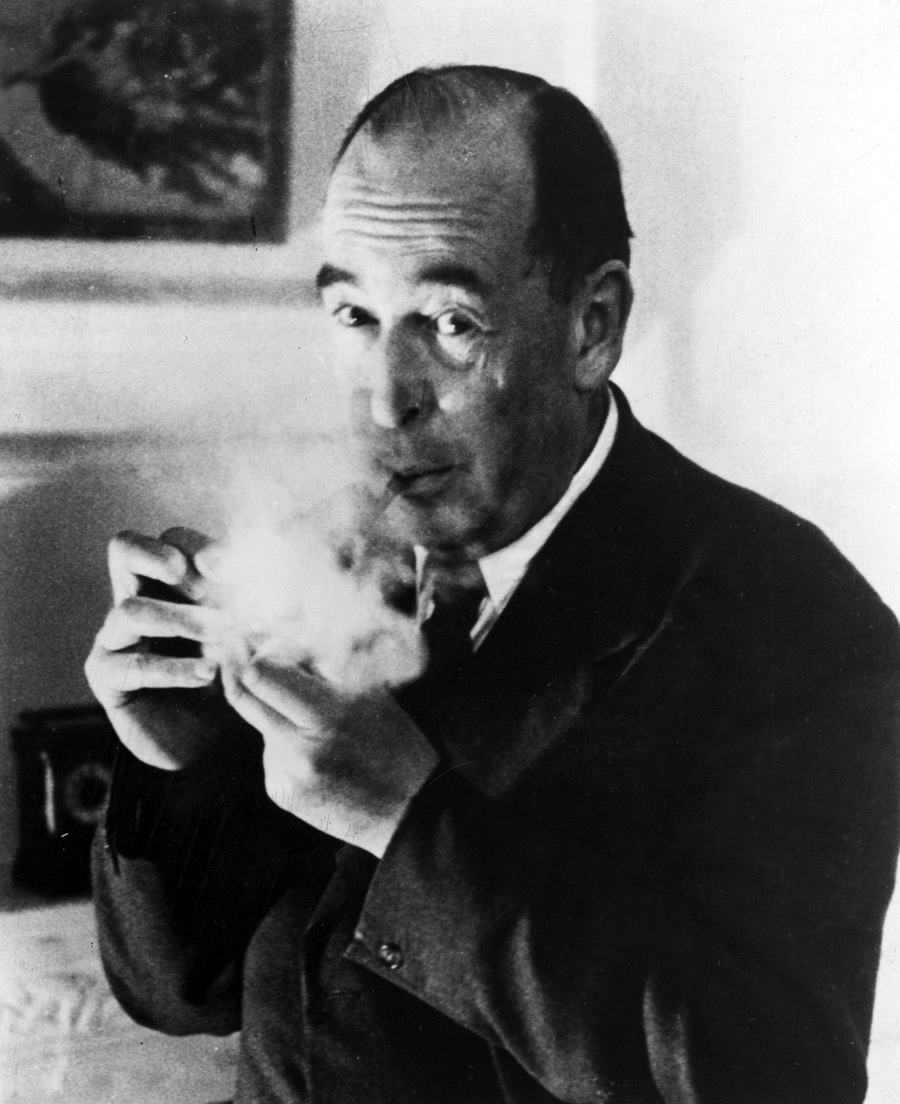
C. S. Lewis, c. 1957

This is a list of writings by C. S. Lewis.

== Non-fiction ==
- The Allegory of Love: A Study in Medieval Tradition (1936)
- "Chanson d'Aventure" in The Oxford Magazine, Feb 10, 1938.
- Rehabilitations and Other Essays (1939; two essays not included in Essay Collection [2000])
- The Personal Heresy: A Controversy (with E. M. W. Tillyard, 1939)
- The Problem of Pain (1940)
- The Case for Christianity (1942)
- A Preface to Paradise Lost (1942)
- Broadcast Talks (1942)
- The Abolition of Man (1943)
- Christian Behaviour (1943)
- Beyond Personality (1944)
- "The Inner Ring" (1944)
- Miracles: A Preliminary Study (1947, revised 1960)
- Arthurian Torso (1948; on Charles Williams's poetry)
- Transposition, and Other Addresses (1949)
- Mere Christianity: A Revised and Amplified Edition, with a New Introduction, of the Three Books, Broadcast Talks, Christian Behaviour, and Beyond Personality (1952; based on radio talks of 1941–1944)
- English Literature in the Sixteenth Century (Excluding Drama). Oxford University Press. 1954; 1975. ISBN 0-19-881298-1
- Major British Writers, Vol I (1954; contribution on Edmund Spenser)
- Surprised by Joy: The Shape of My Early Life (1955; autobiography)
- Reflections on the Psalms (1958)
- The Four Loves (1960)
- Studies in Words (1960)
- The World's Last Night and Other Essays (1960)
- An Experiment in Criticism (1961)
- A Grief Observed (1961; first published under the pseudonym N. W. Clerk)
- They Asked for a Paper: Papers and Addresses (1962; all essays found in Essay Collection [2000])
- Introduction to Selections from Layamon's Brut (ed. G. L. Brook, Oxford University Press, 1963)

Posthumous publications:

- Letters to Malcolm: Chiefly on Prayer (1964)
- Beyond the Bright Blur (1963) (a limited-run 30-page excerpt taken from Letters to Malcolm and "published as a New Year's greeting to friends of the author", according to the opening page)
- The Discarded Image: An Introduction to Medieval and Renaissance Literature (1964)
- Screwtape Proposes a Toast and Other Pieces (1965)
- Studies in Medieval and Renaissance Literature (1966; not included in Essay Collection [2000])
- On Stories: and Other Essays on Literature (ed. Walter Hooper, 1966)
- Spenser's Images of Life (ed. Alastair Fowler, 1967)
- Letters to an American Lady (1967)
- Christian Reflections (1967; essays and papers; all essays found in Essay Collection [2000])
- Selected Literary Essays (1969; not included in Essay Collection [2000])
- God in the Dock: Essays on Theology and Ethics (1970)
- Undeceptions (1971; essays; one essay not included in Essay Collection [2000])
- The Weight of Glory and Other Addresses (1980)
- Of Other Worlds (1982; essays; one essay not included in Essay Collection [2000])
- The Business Of Heaven: Daily Readings from C. S. Lewis (Walter Hooper, ed.; 1984)
- Present Concerns (1986; essays; all essays found in Essay Collection [2000])
- All My Road Before Me: The Diary of C. S. Lewis 1922–27 (1993)
- Compelling Reason: Essays on Ethics and Theology (1998)
- The Latin Letters of C.S. Lewis (1999)
- Essay Collection: Literature, Philosophy and Short Stories (2000)
- Essay Collection: Faith, Christianity and the Church (2000)
- Collected Letters, Vol. I: Family Letters 1905–1931 (2000)
- From Narnia to a Space Odyssey: The War of Ideas Between Arthur C. Clarke and C. S. Lewis (2003)
- Collected Letters, Vol. II: Books, Broadcasts and War 1931–1949 (2004)
- Collected Letters, Vol. III: Narnia, Cambridge and Joy 1950–1963 (2007)
- Language and Human Nature with J.R.R. Tolkien (draft discovered in 2009)
- Image and Imagination: Essays and Reviews (2013)

== Fiction ==
- The Pilgrim's Regress (1933)
- The Space Trilogy
1. Out of the Silent Planet (1938)
2. Perelandra (aka Voyage to Venus) (1943)
3. That Hideous Strength (1945)
4. The Dark Tower (1977) - posthumously published abandoned sequel to the first novel
- The Screwtape Letters (1942)
  - "Screwtape Proposes a Toast" (1961) (an addition to The Screwtape Letters)
- The Great Divorce (1945)
- The Chronicles of Narnia
1. The Lion, the Witch and the Wardrobe. Geoffrey Bles. 1950.
2. Prince Caspian. Geoffrey Bles. 1951.
3. The Voyage of the Dawn Treader. Geoffrey Bles. 1952.
4. The Silver Chair. Geoffrey Bles. 1953.
5. The Horse and His Boy. Geoffrey Bles. 1954.
6. The Magician's Nephew. The Bodley Head. 1955.
7. The Last Battle. The Bodley Head. 1956.
- Till We Have Faces (1956)
- "The Shoddy Lands" (short story, Fantasy and Science Fiction, February 1956)
- "Ministering Angels" (short story, Fantasy and Science Fiction, January 1958)
- After Ten Years (1959) - fragment of a novel, included in Of Other Worlds: Essays and Stories
- Boxen: The Imaginary World of the Young C. S. Lewis (ed. Walter Hooper, 1985)
- "Forms of Things Unknown" (n.d.) - included in Of Other Worlds: Essays and Stories

== Poetry ==
- Spirits in Bondage (1919; published under pseudonym Clive Hamilton)
- Dymer (1926; published under pseudonym Clive Hamilton)
- The Future of Forestry (1938)
- "The End of the Wine" (published in Punch, 3 Dec 1947; reprinted in The Magazine of Fantasy and Science Fiction July 1964)
- Poems (ed. Walter Hooper, 1964, a collection of Lewis poems not included in Dymer or Spirits in Bondage)
- Narrative Poems (ed. Walter Hooper, 1969; includes Dymer, Launcelot, The Nameless Isle, and The Queen of Drum.
- The Collected Poems of C. S. Lewis (ed. Walter Hooper, 1994; expanded edition of the 1964 Poems book; includes Spirits in Bondage)
- C.S. Lewis's Lost Aeneid: Arms and Exile (ed. A.T. Reyes, 2011; includes the surviving fragments of Lewis's translation of Virgil's Aeneid, presented in parallel with the Latin text, and accompanied by synopses of missing sections)
- The Collected Poems of C. S. Lewis: A Critical Edition (edited by Don W. King, 2015; Kent State University Press; ISBN 978-1606352021)

== As editor ==
- George MacDonald: An Anthology. 1947.
- Essays Presented to Charles Williams. 1947.
