= Jill Freud =

British actress and theatre director (1927–2025)

- Freud in 2005
- Born: June Beatrice Flewett; 22 April 1927; London, England
- Died: 24 November 2025 (aged 98)
- Occupations: Actress; theatre director
- Years active: 1947–2016
- Spouse: Sir Clement Freud (m. 1950; died 2009)
- Children: 5, including Emma and Matthew

June Beatrice, Lady Freud (née Flewett; 22 April 1927 – 24 November 2025) was a British actress and theatre director. She was also known by her stage-name Jill Raymond, and was usually known as Jill Freud after her marriage to Clement Freud. As a wartime teenager, she was evacuated to C. S. Lewis's house in Oxford and she is said to have been the inspiration for Lucy Pevensie in the Chronicles of Narnia.

== Stay with Lewis ==
June and her two sisters were evacuated from London to escape The Blitz. In the summer of 1943, at the age of 16, she took a housekeeper's job at The Kilns, in Risinghurst, a suburb of Oxford. The house was the property and home of Maureen Dunbar, her late son's friend C. S. Lewis, and his brother Warren Lewis. Her favourite writer was C. S. Lewis, known to his friends as Jack, and initially she had no idea she was living in a house with the same man. She developed what she later called a "tremendous crush" on him. She was highly regarded in the household; C. S. Lewis wrote to her mother praising her in January 1945: "I have never really met anything like her unselfishness and patience and kindness and shall feel deeply in her debt as long as I live."

== Career ==
Freud was an aspiring actress. After two years, she left The Kilns to take up a place at the Royal Academy of Dramatic Art (RADA), her fees being paid by Lewis. Following her graduation, she embarked upon a successful career in the West End under the stage name Jill Raymond. She married Clement Freud in 1950 and performed in occasional radio plays. In the 1970s, when her husband became a Liberal MP for the Isle of Ely, she helped him canvass.

In 1980, she formed her own theatre company, "Jill Freud and Company", in Suffolk. Her last role was Hugh Grant's Downing Street housekeeper in Love Actually.

In 2001, she received an Honorary Doctorate in Civil Law from the University of East Anglia for services to the theatre.

== Personal life and death ==
Freud was Vice President of TACT, the Actors' Children's Trust.

Freud had five children (one adopted), Nicola, Ashley, Dominic, Emma and Matthew. At the time of her death, she had 18 grandchildren and eight great-grandchildren.

Freud died on 24 November 2025, at the age of 98.

== See also ==
- Freud family
