= Lara, A Tale =

1814 rhymed tragic narrative poem by Lord Byron

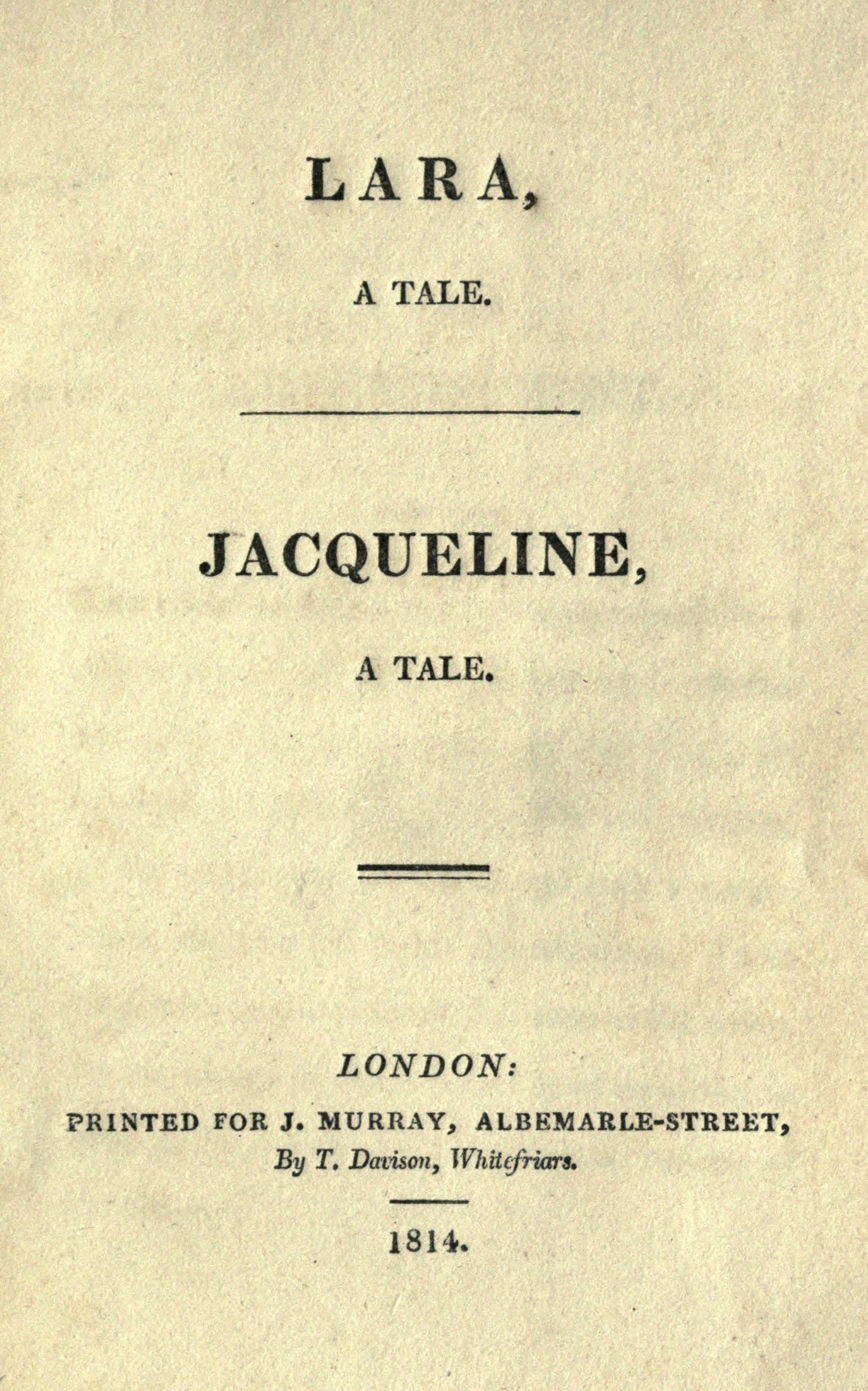
First edition title page

Lara, A Tale, a rhymed tragic narrative poem by Lord Byron, was first published in 1814 in London by John Murray.

Regarded as a continuation of The Corsair, it is a Gothic narrative poem in two cantos about the mysterious, haughty Count Lara, who returns from a long absence in the East to his ancestral Spanish estate. Like Conrad, Count Lara leads a piratical existence. The poem focuses on the themes of isolation, forbidden love, and betrayal.

== Background ==
The first work composed after Byron abandoned the idea of giving up writing and buying back his copyrights, it is regarded by critics as a continuation of the autobiographical work begun in The Corsair. Unlike The Corsair, it was published anonymously, in conjunction with Samuel Rogers' Jacqueline.

Lara, A Tale was first published anonymously by Lord Byron in 1814 alongside another poem that was not written by Byron. In this version, there is nothing to distinguish between Lara and Jacqueline (written by Samuel Rogers), as they were published anonymously and without any indication that there are two separate authors within the text. This tragic narrative poem is seen as a continuation of another poem of Byron's, The Corsair. It details Count Lara's return home after spending a few years travelling abroad. With a page as his only company, Lara's story continues as he encounters problems with his fellow men. First, this leads to a duel that Count Lara ends up winning and as the story progresses, he must also fight both friends and foes. Count Lara is successful in his battle against all odds, until one night he encounters a large group and attempts to fight them. Unfortunately, he is mortally wounded in the process and dies at the end of the poem.

The first drafts of the poem are from 1814. The copy text that Byron wrote for the first edition was made between June 14 and June 23, 1814. There were subsequent corrections made but none of the materials have been found. Sometime after August 5, 1814, Lara was published with Jacqueline for the first time. The first three editions were published together and anonymously, selling almost 7,000 copies. When the fourth edition was released, the tale was published by itself and under Byron's name.

== Summary ==
The narrative poem recounts the story of the fateful return of Count Lara to his home after spending years abroad traveling the orient. One of Byron's footnotes explains that, even though the name "Lara" is of Spanish origin, "no circumstance of local or national description fix[es] the scene or hero of the poem to any country or age".

The poem is composed of two cantos. In the first, the mysterious count Lara, of ancient lineage, returns to his native country after a long absence in foreign countries. He is accompanied solely by an oriental page, Kaled, who is silently devoted to him. Orphaned in youth (“With none to check, with few to point in time/ The thousand paths that slope the way to crime”), Lara had led a dissolute life at home until leaving abroad while quite young. He returns altered, —reserved, haughty, and apparently palled with pleasure and fame (“That brow in furrowed lines had fixed at last/ And spake of passions, but of passions past”).

On a beautiful moonlit night, Lara's servants are awakened by an unearthly shriek from his hall, and they run in to find the count prostrate unconscious on the floor. Lara is revived by Kaled, who speaks to him in a foreign tongue. Though nothing further occurs, Lara's servants are convinced that he had seen an apparition, and that the shriek was emitted by something inhuman.

Lara attends an evening reception given by count Otho, a local dignitary. While looking on the revelers, he is recognized by Sir Ezzelin, a relative of Otho, who angrily challenges him for unnamed crimes abroad. Otho intervenes, and arranges for the two to meet tomorrow before the local nobles to judge the accusations. Lara agrees, and soon leaves the hall, together with Kaled. Sir Ezzelin leaves not long after.

In the second canto, the nobles are assembled on the morrow in Otho's hall to hear the charges and defense. However, although Lara shows up, Ezzelin does not appear. After an angry exchange, Otho offers to fight Lara in his cousin's stead, and is quickly overpowered by Lara, who spares him at the intercession of the nobles.

Meanwhile, Ezzelin has totally disappeared, never having returned from the evening assembly at Otho's hall; suspicion quickly points at Lara, and the unforgiving Otho incites the rest of the nobility to put Lara on trial. Having foreseen the threat, Lara has cultivated the sympathies of the oppressed peasantry of the country, who are ground underfoot by the haughty and detached nobility. When Otho makes his move, Lara rises in rebellion at the head of the serfs.

After some initial success, Lara's undisciplined rabble get the worst of it; when defeat, desertion, and ambush have reduced Lara's army into a small though faithful band, he resolves to lead them over the border into another country. On the very border, however, they are intercepted, and after a stubborn fight in which Lara almost prevails, he is struck by an arrow, and falls mortally wounded from his horse. As Otho and his allies approach to gloat over Lara's fallen state, the count ignores them and dies while speaking with Kaled in a foreign tongue. When Lara expires, Kaled faints, and is discovered to be a woman in disguise. She refuses to leave Lara's body, and remains living by the tree at which he fell and was buried, until her death.

A postscript relates how a local woodcutter saw Sir Ezzelin's body being thrown in the lake by a masked horseman the night of his disappearance.
