= Narrative poetry =

Form of poetry that tells a story

Narrative poetry is a form of poetry that tells a story, often using the voices of both a narrator and characters; the entire story is usually written in metered verse. Narrative poems do not need to rhyme. The poems that make up this genre may be short or long, and the story it relates to may be complex. It is normally dramatic, with various characters. Narrative poems include all epic poetry, and the various types of "lay", most ballads, and some idylls, as well as many poems not falling into a distinct type.

Some narrative poetry takes the form of a novel in verse. An example of this is The Ring and the Book by Robert Browning. In terms of narrative poetry, romance is a narrative poem that tells a story of chivalry. Examples include the Romance of the Rose or Tennyson's Idylls of the King. Although those examples use medieval and Arthurian materials, romances may also tell stories from classical mythology. Sometimes, these short narratives are collected into interrelated groups, as with Chaucer's The Canterbury Tales. So sagas include both incidental poetry and the biographies of poets.

== Oral traditions ==
The oral tradition is the predecessor of essentially all other modern forms of communication. For thousands of years, cultures passed on their history through oral tradition from generation to generation. Historically, much of poetry has its source in an oral tradition: in more recent times the Scots and English ballads, the tales of Robin Hood poems all were originally intended for recitation, rather than reading. In many cultures, there remains a lively tradition of the recitation of traditional tales in verse format. It has been suggested that some of the distinctive features that distinguish poetry from prose, such as metre, alliteration, and kennings, at one time served as memory aids that allowed the bards who recited traditional tales to reconstruct them from memory.

A narrative poem usually tells a story using a poetic theme. Epics are very vital to narrative poems, although it is thought those narrative poems were created to explain oral traditions. The focus of narrative poetry is often the pros and cons of life.

== List of narrative poems ==
All epic poems, verse romances and verse novels can also be thought of as extended narrative poems. Other notable examples of narrative poems include:

- The anonymous Homeric Hymns to Demeter, Apollo, Aphrodite, Hermes, Dionysus, and Pan
- Metamorphoses by Ovid
- The anonymous Poetic Edda
- Piers Plowman by William Langland
- The Book of the Duchess and The Canterbury Tales by Geoffrey Chaucer
- The Assembly of Gods (anonymous)
- The Morall Fabillis of Esope the Phrygian by Robert Henryson
- Tam Lin (anonymous)
- Hero and Leander by Christopher Marlowe
- The Rape of Lucrece, Venus and Adonis, The Lover's Complaint, The Phoenix and the Turtle by William Shakespeare
- Hudibras by Samuel Butler
- The Dunciad and The Rape of the Lock by Alexander Pope
- "Halloween" by Robert Burns
- The Rime of the Ancient Mariner by Samuel Taylor Coleridge
- Mattie the Goose-boy by Mihály Fazekas
- Childe Harold's Pilgrimage and Lara, A Tale by Lord Byron
- The Eve of St. Agnes and Lamia by John Keats
- The Prisoner of the Caucasus by Alexander Pushkin
- Lays of Ancient Rome by Thomas Babington Macaulay
- Paul Revere's Ride, The Courtship of Miles Standish and The Wreck of the Hesperus by Henry Wadsworth Longfellow
- The Battle of Marathon: A Poem by Elizabeth Barrett Browning
- János Vitéz by Sándor Petőfi
- The Raven by Edgar Allan Poe
- Snow-Bound by John Greenleaf Whittier
- Idylls of the King, and many other works by Alfred, Lord Tennyson
- The Fakeer of Jungheera by Henry Louis Vivian Derozio
- Childe Roland to the Dark Tower Came and Red Cotton Night-Cap Country by Robert Browning
- Sohrab and Rustum by Matthew Arnold
- Terje Vigen by Henrik Ibsen
- The Hunting of the Snark and The Walrus and the Carpenter by Lewis Carroll
- Martín Fierro by José Hernández
- Eros and Psyche by Robert Bridges
- Luceafărul by Mihai Eminescu
- The Highwayman by Alfred Noyes
- The Legend of Sigurd and Gudrun by J. R. R. Tolkien
- The Road Not Taken by Robert Frost
- The Wild Party and The Set-Up by Joseph Moncure March
- Dymer and The Queen of Drum by C. S. Lewis
- The Ship's Cat by Richard Adams
- Lost in Translation by James Merrill
