= Emma Freud =

English broadcaster (born 1962)

Emma Freud OBE
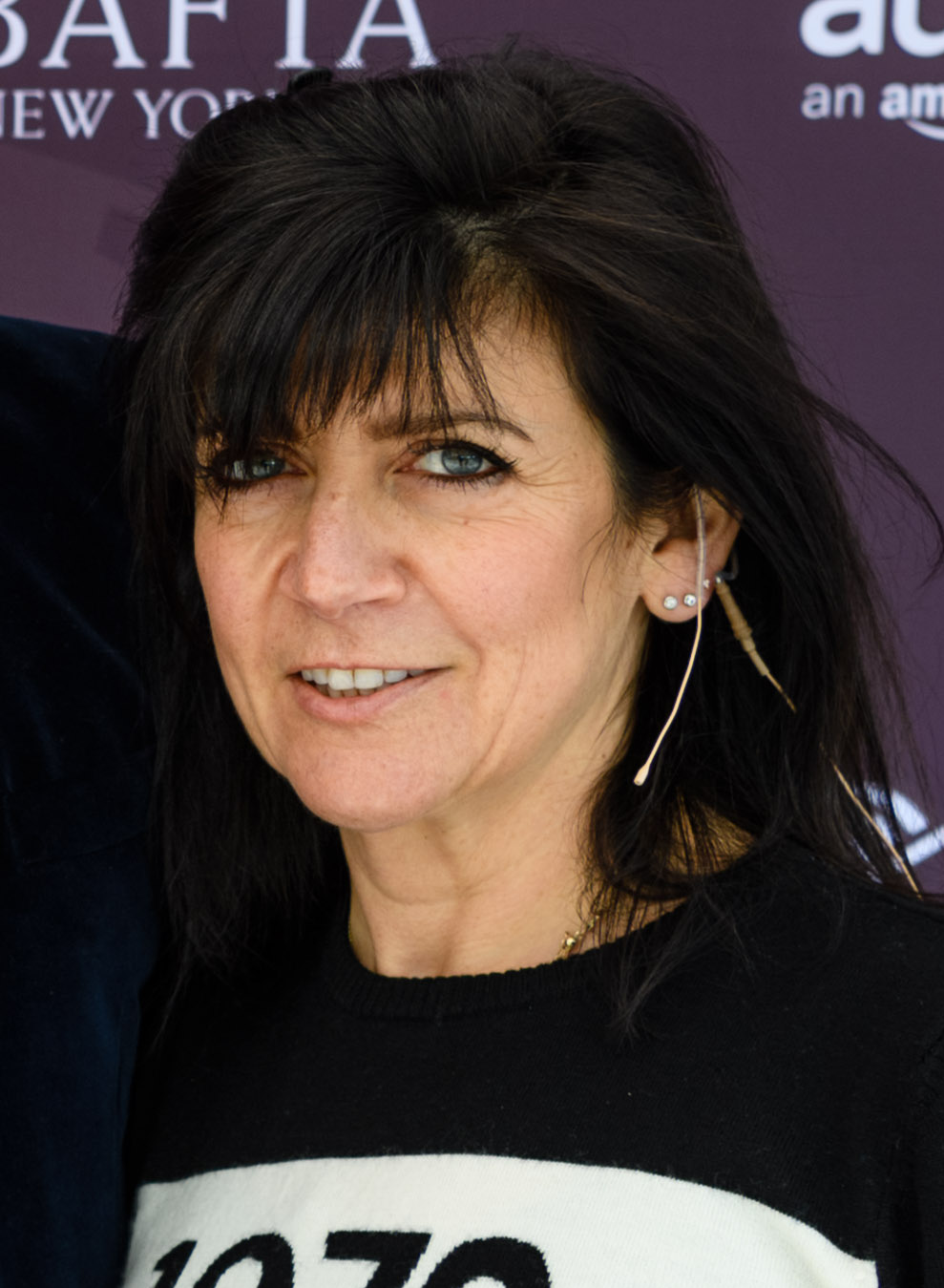
- At the Montclair Film Festival, 2016
- Born: Emma Vallencey Freud; 25 January 1962 (age 64); London, England
- Education: Queen's College school
- Alma mater: Royal Holloway College
- Occupations: Television presenter, cultural commentator
- Years active: 1984–present
- Spouse: Richard Curtis (m. 2023)
- Children: 4, including Scarlett Curtis
- Parent(s): Sir Clement Freud; Jill Freud
- Emma Freud's voice recorded November 2013

Emma Vallencey Freud (born 25 January 1962) is an English broadcaster and cultural commentator.

== Early life ==
Freud was born in London on 25 January 1962 and is the daughter of politician and broadcaster Sir Clement Freud (1924–2009) and June Flewett (1927–2025), known as the actress Jill Freud. She is the great-granddaughter of psychoanalyst Sigmund Freud. Her younger brother is Matthew Freud, and her uncle was the painter Lucian Freud. Her father's family were Jewish refugees.

Freud was educated in London at the all-female Queen's College school, attended Bristol University and Royal Holloway College.

At 13, she performed at the Queen's Theatre (now called Sondheim Theatre) in the West End as the daughter of Vincent Price in Jean Anouilh's Ardèle, and at 17 she toured Europe with Mike Oldfield as a backing singer on his Tubular Bells tour.

At 24, she co directed at the Regent's Park Open Air Theatre, featuring Ralph Fiennes in his first role out of drama school.

== Media career ==
=== Television ===
From 1986, Freud co-presented LWT's The Six O'Clock Show. In 1987, she presented a chat show, Pillow Talk, in which she interviewed guests as part of LWT's late-night strand Night Network.

In 1990 and 1991, Freud presented two series of Plunder, a BBC2 chat show in which she interviewed guests including Spike Milligan, Harriet Harman and Joanna Lumley, and co-hosted the BAFTA Craft Awards with Kenneth Branagh. Freud also presented three seasons of the BBC2 Edinburgh Nights. On Channel 4 Freud hosted two series of The Pulse, three series of The Media Show and presented the Turner Prize in 1992.

For three seasons she fronted the arts show Theatreland. In 2014, she appeared on a celebrity edition of The Great British Bake Off for Comic Relief, and was declared a star baker.

=== Radio ===
In 1988, she was one of the launch presenters of BBC Greater London Radio 94.9fm, where she presented the weekday 10am–12pm programme, produced by Chris Evans.

In 1993, Freud was invited by BBC Radio 1's new controller Matthew Bannister to reinvent the lunchtime programme. From January 1994, she appeared on a permanent basis every weekday between 12pm–2pm, presenting a mix of music, interviews and interactive news features.

Since 1986, she has worked for BBC Radio 4 – as a regular co-host on the Saturday miscellany show Loose Ends, as well as hosting Midweek and One to One. In 2019, Freud interviewed author David Sedaris for BBC Radio 4 in a 3-hour feature looking back at his life's work.

=== Film ===
Since 1992, Freud has worked with her husband, Richard Curtis, as either script editor or co-producer on his various films and programmes. These include Four Weddings and a Funeral, Notting Hill, Bridget Jones's Diary, Love Actually, The Boat That Rocked, The Girl in the Café, About Time, The Vicar of Dibley, and Yesterday.

=== Journalism ===
Freud has written for The Telegraph, The Guardian and Radio Times. She currently has a column in Luxx Magazine for The Times.

Since 2015, she has been a monthly columnist for BBC Good Food, writing about international food culture and interviewing chefs while she cooks one of their signature dishes. These include Yotam Ottolenghi, Rick Stein, Mary Berry, Stanley Tucci, Nigel Slater, Asma Khan, Michel Roux and Nigella Lawson.

== Other work ==
=== Cultural work ===
For six years, Freud hosted the national and international broadcasts for National Theatre Live. Since 2009, she has chaired many Platform performances at the National Theatre – interviewing actors, writers and directors including Sir John Mortimer, Sir Nicholas Hytner and Bryan Cranston.

She has chaired at festivals and live events – including interviews with Al Pacino, Graham Norton, Mary Berry, Nadiya Hussain and Claudia Winkleman.

She has presented the Emma Freud Talks To... strand at the Cheltenham Literary Festival – speaking to guests including Sir David Attenborough, Bill Nighy, Helena Bonham Carter, Sir Lenny Henry, and Bono.

=== Charity and campaigning work ===
Freud has worked for Comic Relief since 1992 – starting with stuffing envelopes, rising to Executive Producer of Red Nose Day. Together with Richard Curtis, she has helped raise money for projects tackling poverty across the UK and internationally.

From 2004 to 2005, she was a co-creator of Make Poverty History and the Live 8 concerts.

She was awarded an OBE for services to the charitable sector in 2011.

She is a patron of Suffolk Libraries.

In October 2026, Emma was awarded an honorary doctorate by the University of Suffolk in recognition of her contributions to film, broadcasting and charitable work.

== See also ==
- Freud family
