= The Queen of Drum =

Narrative poem by C. S. Lewis

"The Queen of Drum" is a narrative poem by C. S. Lewis published by J.M. Dent in 1969, posthumously by Lewis' trustee and literary adviser Walter Hooper. It is noted for its varying meter, but has been criticised for having a weak plot. It is included in the publication Dymer.

== Synopsis ==
In this poignant poem, the Kingdom of Drum is subject to a palace revolution: the top-ranked army general cleanly disposes of the aged king and proclaims himself the replacement monarch. The spirited, young queen - ordered to promptly remarry the general - pretends acquiescence: escaping en route to her place of incarceration.

With the hue-and-cry being raised in pursuit behind her, the fugitive queen employs her woodland skills to lose herself quickly in the depths of the forest. On the move - and free for the moment - she faces a choice of how best she might remove herself beyond the risk of recapture.
