= Denis Saurat =

French author (1890–1958)

- Born: 21 March 1890; Toulouse, France
- Died: 7 June 1958 (aged 68); Nice, France

Denis Saurat (21 March 1890 – 7 June 1958) was an Anglo-French scholar, writer, and broadcaster on a wide range of topics, including explaining French society and culture to the English and what he called "philosophical poetry."

== Biography ==
He was born in Toulouse and died in Nice, France, but his most active years were spent in London, England. His views on the connection in the early modern period between the poetry of Edmund Spenser and John Milton and the occult, represented in particular by the Kabbalah, were ahead of their time: without surviving close scholarly analyses, they anticipated later studies such as those of Frances Yates. He also interpreted in light of Philosophical Poetry the Prophetic Books of William Blake and discussed Blake's relationship to Milton and Celtic antiquarians.

At the outbreak of World War I, he was a reader in French at Glasgow University in Scotland. After receiving a doctorate of the University of Bordeaux, and a lauréat des concours d'agrégation in 1919, he became associated with the Department of French at King's College London from 1920, where he was a professor from 1926. He was also director for many years of the French Institute of London (Institut Français) in South Kensington. During World War II his position there and his wish to maintain the autonomy of the Institut led him into a serious clash with Charles de Gaulle. This concerned not only the politics of the Free French, but also Saurat's resistance to the General's technocratic ambitions for the Institut. Under official pressure to move to Bristol, Saurat came through with support from Vere Ponsonby, 9th Earl of Bessborough. Instead, he resigned from the Institut, retired from the university, and settled in Nice. In his last years he took an active interest in PEN International, composed poems in Occitan, his mother tongue, and wrote best-selling books of speculative non-fiction on Atlantis and the early history of Earth.

The term "Scottish Renaissance" was brought into critical prominence by Saurat in his article "Le Groupe de la Renaissance Écossaise", which was published in the Revue Anglo-Américaine in April 1924.

== Works ==
- La pensée de Milton (1920) as Milton: Man and Thinker (1925)
- Blake and Milton (1922)
- Milton et le matérialisme chrétien en Angleterre (1928) as Milton and Materialism
- The Three Conventions: Metaphysical Dialogues, Principia Metaphysica, and Commentary (1926)
- Tendances, essays de critique (1928)
- Blake and Modern Thought (1929)
- La religion de Victor Hugo (1929)
- La littérature et l'occultisme. Études sur la poésie philosophique moderne (1929) as Literature and Occult Tradition (1930) translated by Dorothy Bolton
- Histoire des Religions (1933) as A History of Religions (1934)
- Selected Essays and Critical Writings of A. R. Orage (1935) editor with Herbert Read
- Modernes (1935)
- La fin de la peur (1937) as The End of Fear
- Perspectives (1938)
- French War Aims (1940)
- The Christ at Chartres (1940)
- The Spirit of France (1940)
- Regeneration, with a Letter from General de Gaulle (1941)
- Watch Over Africa (1941)
- Death and the Dreamer (1946) as La mort et le rêveur (1947)
- Modern French Literature, 1870-1940 (1946)
- William Blake Selected Poems (1947) editor
- Gods of the People (1947)
- Angels and Beasts (1947) French short stories, editor
- La religion esotérique de Victor Hugo (1948)
- Victor Hugo et les dieux du people (1948) La Littérature et l'occultisme II
- L'expérience de l'au-delà (1951)
- William Blake (1954) in French
- L'Atlantide et le règne des géants (1954) as Atlantis and the Giants (1957)
- La religion des géants et la civilisation des insectes (1955)
- Commentary on Beelzebub's Tales (1969)
- The Denis Saurat Reader (2004)
- Early Earth (2006)
- John Robert Colombo (2003), editor, O Rare Denis Saurat
- John Robert Colombo (2004), editor, The Denis Saurat Reader
- John Robert Colombo (2006), editor, Early Earth
- Jean-François Courouau (2010), author, translator, Encaminament Catar

== Notes ==
Non-profit organization positions
Preceded by Jules Romains	Wartime International Presidential Committee 1941-47 PEN International; 1941–1947	Succeeded by François Mauriac
