= They Asked for a Paper =

1962 collection of essays by C. S. Lewis

- Author: C.S. Lewis
- Genre: Poetry
- Publisher: Geoffrey Bles Ltd
- Publication date: 1962
- Pages: 244

They Asked for a Paper: Papers and Addresses is a collection of essays by C. S. Lewis. This collection of twelve essays by C. S. Lewis was published by Geoffrey Bles in 1962.

The collection includes some of Lewis's thoughts on literary topics and people along with some of his thinking about the social sciences. One of the most important essays that appears in They Asked for a Paper is Lewis's inaugural address at the University of Cambridge, entitled "De Descriptione Temporum," Latin for "On a Description of the Times." In the lecture he argued that the most important historical date was not the division between medieval times and the Renaissance but 1830 which was what he termed the beginning of the Age of Enlightenment.

It was Lewis's last book to be published in his lifetime, as he died on 22 November the following year.

== Contents ==
- "De Descriptione Temporum"
- "Hamlet: The Prince or the Poem?"
- "The Inner Ring"
- "Is Theology Poetry?"
- "Kipling's World"
- "Lilies that Fester"
- "The Literary Impact of the Authorized Version"
- "On Obstinacy in Belief"
- "Psychoanalysis and Literary Criticism"
- "Sir Walter Scott"
- "Transposition"
- "The Weight of Glory"
