= Studies in Words =

Non-fiction work by C. S. Lewis

First edition

Studies in Words is a work of linguistic scholarship written by C. S. Lewis and published by the Cambridge University Press in 1960. In this book, Lewis examines the history of various words used in the English language which have changed their meanings often quite widely throughout the centuries. The meanings in the predecessor languages are also part of the discussion.

Lewis's motivation for writing the book was in explaining to students of the work of previous centuries that the definition of a word that they already think they know (his dangerous sense, which he abbreviates D.S.) may yield a total misunderstanding of what the author meant to say. Those who have a large vocabulary are actually more likely to pick a wrong meaning because they can rationalize its enjambment. Some of the earlier meanings are only partially recalled in stock phrases, such as "world without end," which employs the earlier use of the word "world" to mean 'age'.

The words studied are nature, in all its phrases, especially "human nature"; sad, which originally meant "heavy"; wit; free, with all its differences from slavery and villainy; sense, with its two meanings of perception and judgement; simple; conscience and conscious; world; and life; with also the phrase "I dare say!" examined. The details of the history of these seemingly straightforward words encompasses 300 pages.

== Reception ==
Jackson J. Campbell, writing for the Journal of English and Germanic Philology, gave a negative review, criticizing the text for its errors and calling the text "disappointing", but writing that the text was otherwise enjoyable. Eric John Dobson praised the text as "an excellent book, which deserves to be widely known and red"; Dobson praised Lewis' writing on the word conscience and criticized several errors made by Lewis. William G. Moulton praised the book as "readable, informative...and witty" but also criticized it as "amateurish", and stated that it had little to offer professional linguists beyond "a delightful style and many well-chosen examples".
