= Reflections on the Psalms =

1956 theological book by C. S. Lewis

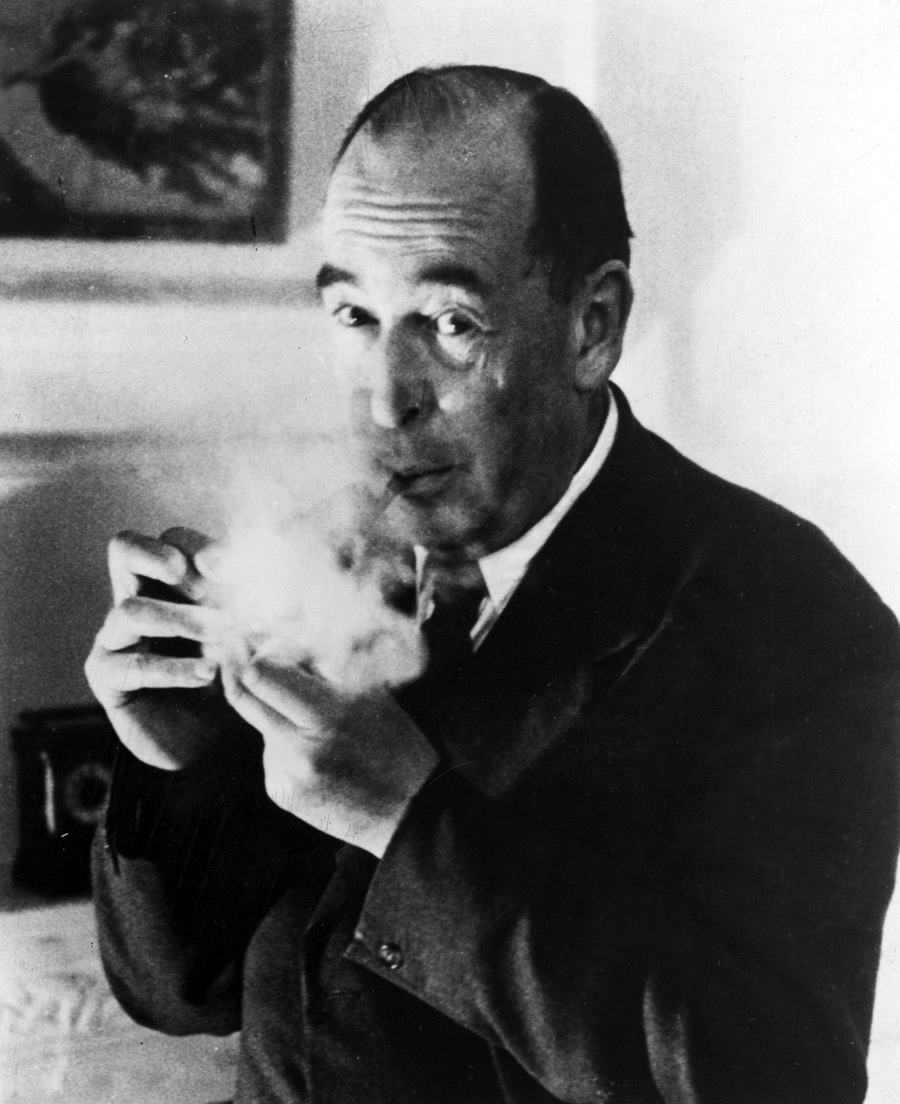
C. S. Lewis, the author of the book

Reflections on the Psalms is a work of popular, devotional theology written by British apologist, scholar, and lay theologian C. S. Lewis and published in London by Geoffrey Bles and in New York by Harcourt, Brace and Company in 1958.

In the volume, Lewis explores the Old Testament sacred text Psalms and applies the poems it contains to modern life. He emphasises the Psalms as literature to be enjoyed, a theme of much of his literary criticism.

The book is one of Lewis's later popular books and, alongside Till We Have Faces (1958) and The Four Loves (1960), reveals the influence of his wife, Joy Davidman (1915–1960).

Although Lewis denied that the book could be classified as "what is called" apologetics, several critics have disagreed with this assessment and noted its relevance for that field. Others have highlighted that the book is "difficult" to "categorize".

== Background ==
As Harry Lee Poe notes, the idea for Reflections on the Psalms came out of a turbulent time in Lewis's life, with the illness of his wife, Joy. He commenced writing in early June 1957, and his manuscript was with the typist by 22 October.

The book "consists of a series of brief essays dealing with various aspects of the Psalms".

Lewis explores themes of judgement (Chapter 2), "The Cursings" (Chapter 3), and death (Chapter 4) in the Psalms, followed by a chapter on "The Fair Beauty of the Lord" (Chapter 5). Chapter 6 is entitled "Sweeter Than Honey" and considers the concept of the Law as presented in the Psalms. Respective sections on "Connivance" (Chapter 7) and Nature (Chapter 8) follow. The fact that Lewis dedicated a chapter to the subject of the natural world reflects his lifelong appreciation for the environment and animal life.

In Chapter 9, Lewis comments on the notion of religious "praise", after which he moves to three chapters considering hermeneutics: Second Meanings (Chapter 10); Scripture (Chapter 11), and Second Meanings in the Psalms (Chapter 12).

In his introduction to the work, Lewis emphasises that it is not intended as an academic study: "I am no Hebraist, no higher critic, no ancient historian, no archaeologist." Instead, it is written "as one amateur to another, talking about difficulties I have met, or lights I have gained, when reading the Psalms, with the hope that this might at any rate interest, and sometimes even help, other inexpert readers". He characterises his approach as "'comparing notes', not presuming to instruct".

Notably, Lewis did not utilise the King James Version in Reflections on the Psalms, drawing instead on Coverdale's translation of the Psalms, which is used in the Psalter of the Book of Common Prayer. As Poe notes, this would have been the translation Lewis consulted daily when saying his prayers.

== Critical reception ==
In a review published in Jewish Social Studies, Robert Gordis of The Jewish Theological Seminary commended Lewis for the "highly unconventional" work, while noting "several handicaps" under which Lewis was working, including erroneous English translations of Hebrew texts and his "easy assumption of the superiority of Christianity over Judaism".

Nevertheless, he appreciated Lewis's sensitivity towards the Jewish character of the Psalms:

In view of his theological bias, it is all the more remarkable that he is able to appreciate several aspects of the Psalms which are particularly Jewish, such as the love of the Torah, the praise of the Lord and the glorification of the Temple in Jerusalem. [...] It is also worth noting that he frankly recognizes that the Psalms are Jewish, and does not attempt to disguise their character by referring to them as "Hebrew" or "Israelite."

Gordis also praised the literary contribution of the volume, noting that it provides "striking insight into the literary quality of the Psalms and their poetic character". He concluded that the book "calls upon all the critical faculties of the reader, in order to separate the gold from the dross and extract the grain from the chaff."

Within less than two hundred pages, there is a succession of brilliant insights on life and literature, striking epigrams, downright errors and unabashed prejudices together with a dash of the crochets that many Englishmen seem to regard as charming.

In a 2022 review published via Patheos, William Hemsworth commends Lewis's "mastery to define terms, and ability to paint vivid descriptions" in the book, emphasising the expositional nature of the work.

In contrast, Christopher Assenza highlights the apologetic relevance of Reflections on the Psalms, despite Lewis's denial of that classification. He notes the often troubling "invective language" in the Old Testament book as well as "the occasional self-righteousness of the Psalmists". In light of these concerns, Assenza argues that Lewis offers "a way of reading Scripture that accepts the human aspects of its authorship without diluting its inherently divine nature and purpose". He characterises Reflections on the Psalms as "characteristically honest, intelligent, accessible, and, in many ways, comforting".

In the third volume of his extensive study of Lewis's life, Poe also disagrees with Lewis's denial that Reflections on the Psalms can be seen as a work of apologetics, citing Lewis's own admission that the book was for "those who are ready, while reading, to 'suspend their disbelief'". "It is real apologetics after all," Poe argues, "It is to help people resolve questions they have about biblical faith."

Similarly, Brett Vanderzee argues in Christianity Today that Lewis offers "a wise and humane framework for understanding Scripture’s more scandalous parts", helping Christians to "see the enduring beauty of the Psalms—even and especially the gruesome ones."

In their study of the "environmental vision of C. S. Lewis", Matthew T. Dickerson and David O'Hara quote extensively from Reflections on the Psalms, highlighting its value for an understanding of Lewis's relationship with the natural world and animals.

Asbury Theological Seminary's Michael L. Peterson has noted the book's relevance for establishing Lewis's view on the doctrine of Biblical inerrancy and inspiration.
