= The World's Last Night and Other Essays =

Book by C.S. Lewis

- First edition
- Author: C. S. Lewis
- Language: English
- Genre: Essay collection
- Publisher: Harcourt Brace
- Publication date: 1960
- Publication place: United States

The World's Last Night and Other Essays is a collection of essays by C. S. Lewis published in the United States in 1960. The title essay is about the Second Coming of Jesus Christ. The volume also contains a follow-up to Lewis' 1942 novel The Screwtape Letters in the form of "Screwtape Proposes a Toast." The second, fourth and fifth pieces were published in the U.K. in a volume called Screwtape Proposes a Toast and other pieces (1965); the first, sixth and seventh were published in the U.K. in Fern-seed and Elephants and other essays on Christianity (1975). All the pieces were later collected in the comprehensive Essay Collection and Other Short Pieces (2000).

== Contents ==
=== "Religion and Rocketry" / "Will We Lose God in Outer Space" ===
What did Lewis think of the possibility of discovering life on other planets? What implications might such a discovery have for Christian theology? Originally published in the Christian Herald and entitled “Will We Lose God in Outer Space,” Lewis's essay on the subject was first published in 1958 and later became titled “Religion and Rocketry.” The essay was written in partial response to the writings of Professor Fred Hoyle, the Cambridge astronomer and founder of the Institute of Astronomy at Cambridge.

In 1958, Hoyle was Plumian professor of astronomy at Cambridge and engaged in the study of the structure and evolution of the stars. Even though he coined the phrase “Big Bang,” Hoyle rejected the ‘big bang’ theory of the origin of the universe in favor of the steady state theory, which claimed that the universe has always looked as it does now. Martin Ryle, however, held to the Big Bang theory for the creation of the universe in a moment, the theory that eventually held sway. Some of Hoyle's writings, including science fiction and plays, popularized astronomy. Christopher H. Derrick of Geoffrey Bles publishers, presumably in 1963 and before Lewis's death, wrote a proposal for a book that was to include “Religion and Rocketry”, stating that “This essay seems to have been written in rebuttal of an argument which is only likely to be brought forward by a rather silly minority (though an academically distinguished one)…” Hoyle would have been part of that minority.

Lewis also mentioned Professor Hoyle (1915–2001) in his essay “The Seeing Eye” (1963). In “The Seeing Eye”, Lewis challenged the conclusion of the Russian cosmonauts, who concluded that there was no God, since they did not find Him in outer space. In that same essay, Lewis claimed that Hoyle and many others were saying that life must have originated in many times and places, given the vast size of the universe. He was referring to a series of broadcast talks that Hoyle had given in 1950, later published as The Nature of the Universe, a series of talks that argued against a Christian view of origins and the uniqueness of the Christian faith. Later, in 1977, Hoyle championed the ancient theory of panspermia, supported these days by Richard Dawkins, that life on Earth originated with the importation of living cells from space.

The philosopher C.E.M. Joad agreed with Lewis and concluded that the size of the universe and the span of time in which it formed did not have “any necessary bearing upon our views as to the nature of the universe as a whole, more particularly as regards its origin, purpose, destiny and end.” The enlargement of the scale of the universe did not reduce the importance of mankind. Disagreeing with Hoyle, Lewis thought it unlikely that life existed anywhere else in the Solar System, but that it was at least possible elsewhere in the galaxy. He argued that “those who do not find Him on earth are unlikely to find Him in space.” People with dogmatic preconceptions, and scientists are not immune to such positions, will find themselves looking for evidence to support their preconceived opinions. Science is not equipped to do theology and evaluate the arguments for the existence of God, and, furthermore, the discovery of life in other parts of the universe would have no effect upon Christianity.

The essay itself starts with Lewis proclaiming two equal and opposite scientific proposals: one, that life only began on earth with the rarest of accidents, and another, proposed by Hoyle, that life probably began in many places. Both positions, Lewis wrote, claim to show the absurdity of the Christian belief in divine origins and the Incarnation of Christ. There is nothing odd about arguments from two very different positions both being able to attack Christianity. Since the world is full of many mutually inconsistent theories, the combination of disagreements between them is multidimensional.

The cogency of Hoyle's argument, wrote Lewis, was dependent upon five other questions, which must be answered before we can give any credence to Hoyle.

1. Are there animals anywhere else besides earth?
2. If yes, do any of these animals have what we call ‘rational souls’? That is, are they spiritual beings?
3. If there are such spiritual beings, are any or all of them, like us, fallen?
4. If any of them have fallen, have they been denied Redemption by the Incarnation and Passion of Christ? Christ could have come to those worlds also.
5. Finally, if all of the first four questions could be answered yes, is it certain that this is the only possible mode of Redemption?

In Paul's letter to the Romans (8:19–23), Lewis argued, God hints that the longing for redemption is cosmic, and therefore not limited to this world. Perhaps redemption has happened for all those who need it, has happened through Christ's redemption, and has somehow been extended to other creatures. But we really don't know. And to speculate about other creatures in other worlds takes us into the imaginative narrative that comprises Lewis's Ransom Trilogy, especially Out of the Silent Planet and Perelandra. One paragraph of the essay in particular, beginning with the words “It is interesting to wonder…,” imagines the scenario that Lewis spells out in Out of the Silent Planet. We find Lewis speculating that the vast distances in the universe are “God’s quarantine precautions,” designed to prevent the rest of the universe from being contaminated by the corruption of our world. The rest of the essay continues that speculation, and I will leave it to the reader of this article to pursue the original article by Lewis and enjoy his speculation for itself.

=== "The World's Last Night" / "Christian Hope - Its Meaning for Today" ===
The last essay was written by Lewis about the Second Coming, using for its title (and part of the original essay) a phrase from the first line and title of a poem by seventeenth-century poet John Donne (1572–1631). That poem, "Holy Sonnet XIII: What If This Present Were The World's Last Night?" raises the question of how we should live if the world were ending today. Originally entitled "Christian Hope--Its Meaning for Today," this essay was first printed in the periodical Religion in Life (Winter 1952–53). Its purpose is stated in the first paragraph of the essay: "I shall endeavor to deal with some of the thoughts that may deter modern men from a firm belief in, or a due attention to, the return or Second Coming of the Saviour." Dr. Albert Schweitzer had overemphasized this doctrine, but we should not compensate by underemphasizing it. The essay especially focuses on the nature of Christ, who was the God-Man, and it challenges the modern thought that history always produces progress. He concludes by suggesting that we live our lives, our vocations, with the understanding that there is a judgment coming.
