= Dymer (poem) =

Narrative poem by C. S. Lewis

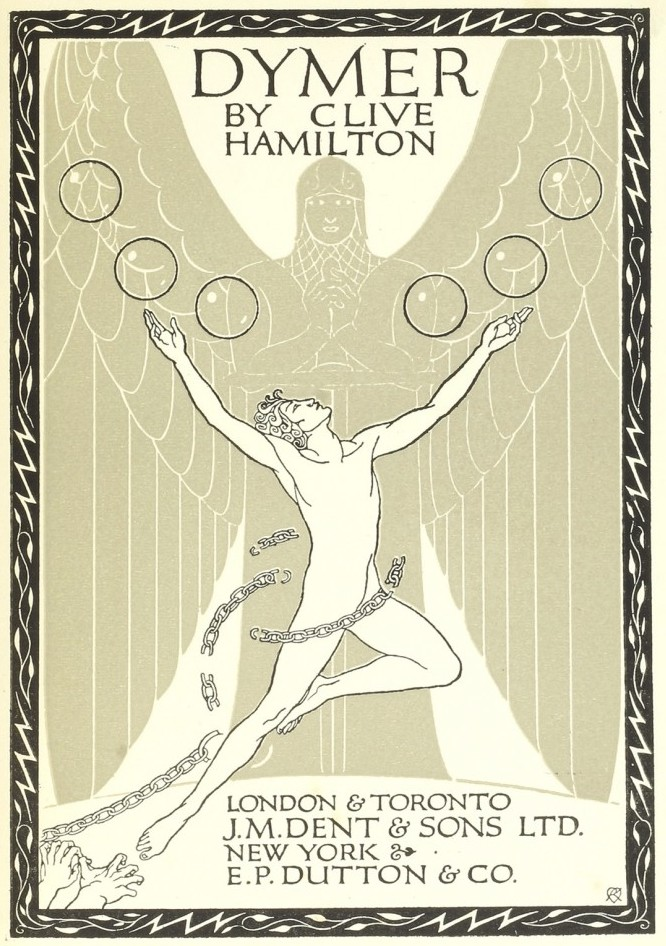
Frontispiece of the first edition of poem

Dymer is a narrative poem by C. S. Lewis. He worked on this, his most important poem, as early as 1916—when still only 17 years old—and completed it in 1925. Dymer was his second published work; it was published by J. M. Dent in 1926, under the pseudonym Clive Hamilton (the writer's actual first name followed by his mother's maiden name).

Lewis thought of himself as writing in the tradition of Homer, Spenser, Milton, Wordsworth and others. George Sayer's analysis suggests that the book is about the temptation of "the fantasies of love, lust, and power".

== Plot overview ==
Dymer, an epic poem consisting of 2,065 lines, follows the adventures of its titular protagonist from his birth in a totalitarian state, mockingly referred to as 'The Perfect City', to the events leading to his death at the hands of a monster he begat.

From the opening, Dymer grows to the age of nineteen under the control of the state, until, under the influence of spring and the sight of a songbird, he rises in his lecture-hall and murders the aged lecturer before his class, then leaves the stunned civilians behind as he wanders outside The City.

Dymer casts off his clothing along with civilization, wandering in the forests until he comes upon an empty mansion with food prepared. After dressing himself again with finer clothing, and feasting alone at a banquet table, Dymer sleeps with an unseen female figure who comes to him in the darkness of the mansion. Upon awakening, Dymer steps outside of the palace and wanders blissfully in the woods. Returning to the palace in search of his lover, he finds every entry barred by a hideous old she-monster. After pleading with her to 'yield but one inch; once only from your law', Dymer approaches the woman with intent to fight his way past her. What happens at this point is uncertain, except that Dymer emerges wounded from the palace and limps into the woodlands.

It begins to rain that night in the woods, and Dymer encounters yet another person he cannot see in the dark, this time a wounded man. This man also hails from The Perfect City, and tells Dymer of what happened in his absence, specifically that a revolutionary named Bran used Dymer's actions and name to instill violent protest in the citizens, who then went on to sack and raze the city. Dymer is dumbfounded at this information, and stays silent in the night until the man's wounds prove fatal, then sets out again for the wilderness.

Dymer encounters another individual in the wilderness, a man who uses a liquid to put himself into an extended dreaming state. The man convinces Dymer that the answer to his anguish is in the dreaming world, and Dymer swallows a cup of the liquid. In his hallucination, Dymer encounters his former lover from the mansion, but realizes she is monstrous. Instead of accepting this as the truth, he flees the scene as demons rise to assault him. Upon awakening, Dymer is threatened by the dreaming man, and sets off into the wilderness again. Dymer later arrives at a cemetery where he encounters an angelic guardian who tells Dymer of a horrible monster lurking about. The monster was conceived by a union between a divine being and a mortal. Realizing that the beast is his own offspring, Dymer states he must face his own son in battle. Donning the guardian's armor, he prepares to fight the monster, which ends in his own death and the beast becoming a god.

== Bibliography ==
- Hodgens, Richard. "Notes on Narrative Poems." CSL: The Bulletin of the New York C. S. Lewis Society. 7 no. 78 (April 1976): 1–14.
- King, Don W. Dymer. The C. S. Lewis Readers' Encyclopedia. Pages 144–146.
- Lewis, C. S. Preface to the 1950 edition of Narrative Poems. New York: Harcourt Brace Jovanovich, 1950.
- Murphy, Patrick. "C. S. Lewis's Dymer: One More with Hesitation." CSL: The Bulletin of the New York C. S. Lewis Society. 17 no. 200 (June 1986): 1–8.
- Sayer, George. "C. S. Lewis's Dymer." VII: An Anglo-American Literary Review. 1980.
- Slack, Michael. "Sehnsucht and the Platonic Eros in Dymer." CSL: The Bulletin of the New York C. S. Lewis Society. 11 no. 130 (August 1980): 3–7.
- Walsh, Chad. The Literary Legacy of C. S. Lewis. New York: Harcourt Brace Jovanovich, 1979.
