= An Experiment in Criticism =

1961 book by C. S. Lewis

- First edition
- Author: C. S. Lewis
- Language: English
- Subject: Criticism
- Publisher: Cambridge University Press
- Publication date: 1961
- Publication place: England
- Media type: Print
- Pages: 142
- ISBN: 0-521-42281-7
- OCLC: 1018690
- Dewey Decimal: 801.9
- LC Class: LCC PN85.L48

An Experiment in Criticism is a 1961 book by C. S. Lewis in which he proposes that the quality of books should be measured not by how they are written, but by how often they are re-read. To do this, the author describes two kinds of readers. The "unliterary" reader tends not to reread the same book, while the "literary" reader does. He suggests the categorization of books as either "highbrow" or "lowbrow" is deficient in that it fails to appreciate those qualities which have merited re-reading.

== Outline ==
In the book, Lewis outlines some of the differences between his two types of readers. For example, one characteristic of a unliterary reader is the argument "I've read it before", which is a conclusive reason not to read a book. In contrast, literary readers reread books many times, savouring certain passages, and attempting to glean more from subsequent readings.

Lewis also argues that judging books by whether they are "lowbrow" or "highbrow" is not necessarily fruitful; many "lowbrow" books prove to be valuable to a literary reader willing to approach without prejudgment. He posits that books classified as "lowbrow", such as science fiction, are also capable of inducing a passion to re-read and imparting experience which changes a reader's worldview. Lewis suggests that books which are capable of doing this may prove to have enduring merit regardless of their genre. He encourages readers to avoid judging the literary merit of books based on traditional criteria.
