= Joseph Runzo =

American professor publishing

Joseph Runzo is an American professor publishing mainly in the area of a global philosophy of religion. He is a Life Fellow at Clare Hall, Cambridge University.

== Bibliography ==
Bibliography

- Global Philosophy of Religion: A Short Introduction. (Chinese translation) Tsinghua University Distinguished Translation Series in Philosophy, Forthcoming 2007.
- Human Rights and Responsibilities: The Contribution of the World Religions. Co-editor with Nancy M. Martin. Oxford: Oneworld Publications, The Library of Global Ethics and Religion, Fall 2003. 364 pp.
- Ethics in the World Religions. Co-editor with Nancy M. Martin. Oxford: Oneworld Publications, The Library of Global Ethics and Religion, 2001. 381 pp.
- Global Philosophy of Religion: A Short Introduction. Oxford: Oneworld Publications, 2001. 320 pp.
- Love, Sex and Gender in the World Religions. Co-editor with Nancy M. Martin. Oxford: Oneworld Publications, The Library of Global Ethics and Religion, 2000. 298 pp.
- The Meaning of Life in the World Religions. Co-editor with Nancy M. Martin. Oxford: Oneworld Publications, The Library of Global Ethics and Religion, 1999. 330 pp.
- World Views and Perceiving God. London: Macmillan Press, "Library of Philosophy and Religion," 1993; New York: St. Martin's Press, 1994. 240 pp.
- Is God Real? Editor. London: Macmillan Press, "The Library of Philosophy of Religion," 1993; New York: St. Martin's Press, 1993. 216 pp.
- Ethics, Religion and the Good Society: New Directions in a Pluralistic World. Editor. Louisville, Kentucky: Westminster Press, 1992. 200 pp.
- Reason, Relativism, and God. London: Macmillan Press, "The Library of Philosophy and Religion," 1986; New York: St. Martin's Press, 1986. 308 pp.
- Religious Experience and Religious Belief: Essays in the Epistemology of Religion. Co-editor with Craig K. Ihara. New York and London: University Press of America, 1986. 160 pp.
