= Epistemic theory of miracles =

The epistemic theory of miracles is the name given by the philosopher William Vallicella to the theory of miraculous events given by Augustine of Hippo and Baruch Spinoza. According to the theory, there are no events contrary to nature — that is no "transgressions", in Hume's sense, of the laws of nature. An event is a miracle only in the sense that it does not agree with our understanding of nature, or fit our picture of nature, or that it thwarts our expectations as to how the world should behave. According to a perfect scientific understanding there would be no miracles at all.

The name of the theory is derived from the Ancient Greek word ἐπιστήμη, episteme, meaning "well-founded knowledge".

== Augustine's account ==
In The City of God, Book XXI, Chapter 8, Augustine quotes Marcus Varro, Of the Race of the Roman People:

There occurred a remarkable celestial portent; for Castor records that, in the brilliant star Venus, called Vesperugo by Plautus, and the lovely Hesperus by Homer, there occurred so strange a prodigy, that it changed its colour, size, form, course, which never appeared before nor since. Adrastus of Cyzicus, and Dion of Naples, famous mathematicians, said that this occurred in the reign of Ogyges.

So great an author as Varro would certainly not have called this a portent had it not seemed to be contrary to nature. For we say that all portents are contrary to nature; but they are not so. For how is that contrary to nature which happens by the will of God, since the will of so mighty a Creator is certainly the nature of each created thing? A portent, therefore, happens not contrary to nature, but contrary to what we know as nature.

Augustine argues that there can be no true transgression of the laws of nature, because everything that happens according to God's will happens by nature, and a transgression of the laws of nature would therefore happen contrary to God's will. A miracle therefore is not contrary to nature as it really is, but only contrary to nature as our current understanding supposes it to be (Portentum ergo fit non contra naturam, sed contra quam est nota natura).

== Spinoza's account ==
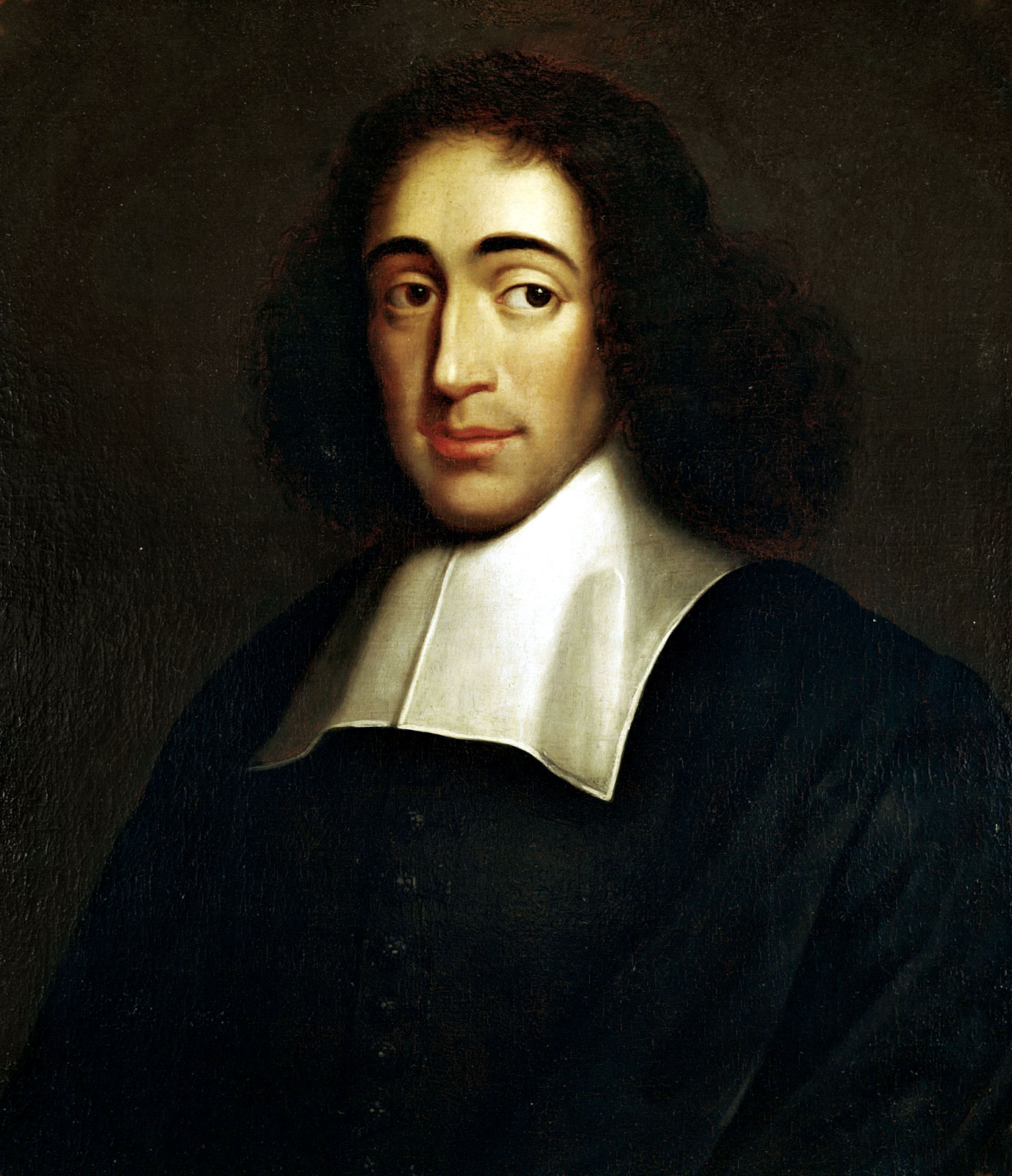
Baruch Spinoza

In Chapter Six of Spinoza's Theologico-Political Treatise ("Of Miracles"), Spinoza claims that the universal laws of nature are decrees of God. Hence, any event happening in nature which contravened nature's universal laws, would necessarily also contravene the Divine decree, nature, and understanding; or if anyone asserted that God acted in contravention to the laws of nature, he, ipso facto, would be compelled to assert that God acted against His own nature—an evident absurdity.

Further, as nothing happens in nature which does not follow from her laws, and as her laws embrace everything conceived by the Divine intellect, and lastly, as nature preserves a fixed and immutable order; it most clearly follows that miracles are only intelligible as in relation to human opinions, and merely mean events of which the natural cause cannot be explained by a reference to any ordinary occurrence, either by us, or at any rate, by the writer and narrator of the miracle.

In other words, according to Spinoza, miracles are not a transgression of natural or scientific laws, but only of natural laws as we currently understand them. A "miracle" is simply an event we cannot explain, and is parasitic upon our ignorance. It is, in reality, a natural event that surpasses our limited human comprehension. To a perfect understanding nothing would appear miraculous. This is the first main point that Spinoza makes in his chapter "Of Miracles."

His second point is that neither God's nature, nor his existence can be known from miracles; they can be known only from the fixed and immutable order of nature. If we understand miracles as actual interruptions or contraventions of the order of nature, and so of the will of God, then not only are they impossible, but they can provide no basis for knowledge of God. However, if understanding miracles epistemically, i.e. as events the causes of which we do not understand, then we have no basis for knowledge of God in this case either. We cannot base knowledge of God on ignorance, and events are miraculous only due to our ignorance of their natural causes.

If, therefore, anything should come to pass in nature which does not follow from her laws, it would also be in contravention to the order which God has established in nature for ever through universal natural laws; it would, therefore, be in contravention to God's nature and laws, and, consequently, belief in it would throw doubt upon everything, and lead to Atheism.

== John Polkinghorne ==
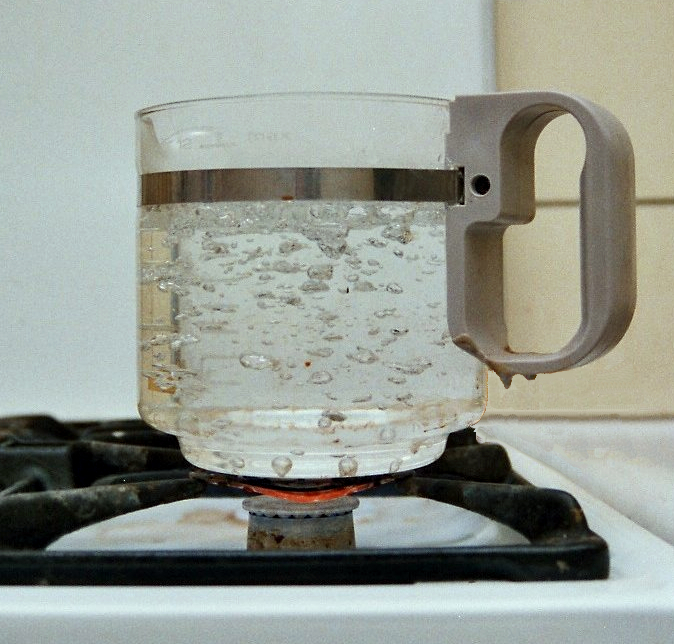
The miracle of boiling

The view of particle physicist and theologian John Polkinghorne is somewhat similar. Polkinghorne argues that an apparently simple event like boiling water, where a small quantity of liquid changes into a large quantity of steam (a phase transition) would seem miraculous to someone who had not seen it every day.

I try to understand God's action that we call miraculous in the same sort of way. There is an underlying consistency of God's relationship to the world but the existence of a new regime may mean that consistency expresses itself in totally unprecedented, totally unexpected consequences.

Polkinghorne argues that God cannot control things on the macroscopic scale by acting microscopically on each elementary particle in the universe, but that He can act within the framework of chaos theory as "pure spirit". As the complex nonlinear systems of life oscillate back and forth trying to decide which strange attractor to move towards, God intervenes gently in the direction that moves the system where he wishes it to go. See Quantum mysticism.

== McLean v. Arkansas ==
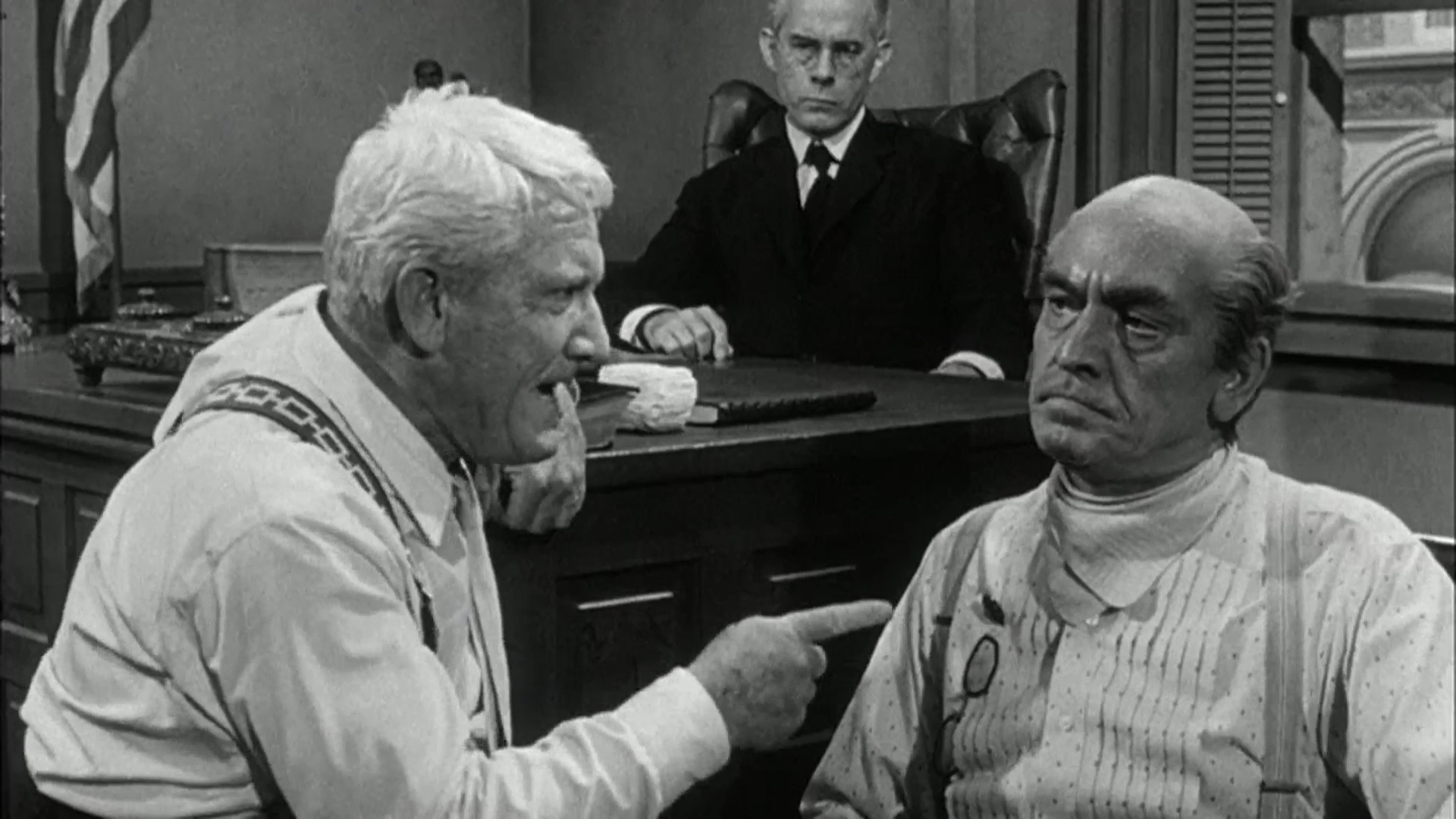
Evolution on trial

The epistemic conception of the miraculous does not agree with the definition given in the famous McLean v. Arkansas case. In this case (McLean v. Arkansas Board of Education, 529 F. Supp. 1255, 1258–1264) (ED Ark. 1982), brought in Arkansas, the judge, William Overton, gave a clear, specific definition of science as a basis for ruling that 'creation science' is religion and not science. His judgment defined the essential characteristics of science as being

1. guided by natural law;
2. explanatory by reference to natural law;
3. empirically testable;
4. tentative in conclusion, i.e. not necessarily the final word;
5. falsifiable.

However, an epistemic explanation of miraculous events would satisfy at least the first two definitions.

== Islamic view of miracles ==
The epistemic conception of the miraculous does not agree with the definition given in the work of the Muslim scholar al-Īd̲j̲ī Mawāḳif, historian A.J. Wensinck, who says that the main purpose of miracle is to prove the sincerity of the apostle and has to satisfy the following conditions:

1. It must be performed by God
2. "It must be contrary to the usual course of things"
3. It should be impossible to contradict it
4. "It must happen at the hands of him who claims to be an apostle"
5. "It must be in conformity with his announcement of it, and the miracle itself must not be a disavowal of his claim"
6. "It must follow on his claim"

This contrasts with the epistemic theory, where a miracle is not contrary to the usual course of things (although it may be contrary to our current understanding).
