= Religion in The Chronicles of Narnia =

The Chronicles of Narnia is a series of seven fantasy novels for children written by C. S. Lewis. It is considered a classic of children's literature and is the author's best-known work, having sold over 100 million copies in 47 languages. The series borrows characters and ideas from Classical, Norse, Irish, Arthurian, Islamic, Jewish and Christian mythology. Of all the mythologies taken into consideration, the Christian one is the most fundamental for the Narnia series, due to the themes covered.

== Christian parallels ==
Specific Christian parallels may be found in the entries for individual books and characters.

C.S. Lewis was an adult convert to Christianity and had previously authored some works on Christian apologetics and fiction with Christian themes. However, he did not originally set out to incorporate Christian theological concepts into his Narnia stories; it is something that occurred as he wrote them. As he wrote in his essay Sometimes Fairy Stories May Say Best What's To Be Said (1956):

Some people seem to think that I began by asking myself how I could say something about Christianity to children; then fixed on the fairy tale as an instrument, then collected information about child psychology and decided what age group I’d write for; then drew up a list of basic Christian truths and hammered out 'allegories' to embody them. This is all pure moonshine. I couldn’t write in that way. It all began with images; a faun carrying an umbrella, a queen on a sledge, a magnificent lion. At first there wasn't anything Christian about them; that element pushed itself in of its own accord.

Lewis, an expert on the subject of allegory and the author of The Allegory of Love, maintained that the Chronicles were not allegory on the basis that there is no one-to-one correspondence between characters and events in the books, and figures and events in Christian doctrine. He preferred to call the Christian aspects of them "suppositional". This indicates Lewis' view of Narnia as a fictional parallel universe. As Lewis wrote in a letter to a Mrs Hook in December 1958:

If Aslan represented the immaterial Deity in the same way in which Giant Despair [a character in The Pilgrim's Progress] represents despair, he would be an allegorical figure. In reality, however, he is an invention giving an imaginary answer to the question, 'What might Christ become like if there really were a world like Narnia, and He chose to be incarnate and die and rise again in that world as He actually has done in ours?' This is not allegory at all.

Although Lewis did not consider them allegorical, and did not set out to incorporate Christian themes in Wardrobe, he was not hesitant to point them out after the fact. In one of his last letters, written in March 1961, Lewis writes:

Since Narnia is a world of Talking Beasts, I thought He [Christ] would become a Talking Beast there, as He became a man here. I pictured Him becoming a lion there because (a) the lion is supposed to be the king of beasts; (b) Christ is called "The Lion of Judah" in the Bible; (c) I'd been having strange dreams about lions when I began writing the work. The whole series works out like this.

The Magician's Nephew tells the Creation and how evil entered Narnia.
The Lion, the Witch and the Wardrobe the Crucifixion and Resurrection.
Prince Caspian restoration of the true religion after corruption.
The Horse and His Boy the calling and conversion of a heathen.
The Voyage of the Dawn Treader the spiritual life (specially in Reepicheep).
The Silver Chair the continuing war with the powers of darkness.
The Last Battle the coming of the Antichrist (the Ape), the end of the world and the Last Judgement.

With the release of the 2005 film there was renewed interest in the Christian parallels found in the books. Some find them distasteful, while noting that they are easy to miss if one is not familiar with Christianity. Alan Jacobs, author of The Narnian: The Life and Imagination of C. S. Lewis, implies that through these Christian aspects, Lewis becomes "a pawn in America's culture wars". Some Christians see the Chronicles as excellent tools for Christian evangelism. The subject of Christianity in the novels has become the focal point of many books.

Rev. Abraham Tucker pointed out that "While there are in the Narnia tales many clear parallels with Biblical events, they are far from precise, one-on-one parallels. (...) Aslan sacrifices himself in order to redeem Edmund, the Traitor, who is completely reformed and forgiven. That is as if the New Testament were to tell us that Jesus Christ redeemed Judas Iscariot and that Judas later became one of the Apostles. (...) There had been times in Christian history when Lewis might have been branded a heretic for far smaller creative innovations in theology."

Alan Jacobs, professor of English at Wheaton College, describes The Lion, the Witch, and the Wardrobe as "a twofold story: the rightful king of Narnia returns to re-establish his kingdom and bring peace; and that same king sacrifices himself to save a traitor . . . kingdom and salvation are what the story is all about." The similarity between the death and resurrection of Aslan and the death and resurrection of Jesus in the Bible has been noted; one author has noted that like Jesus, Aslan was ridiculed before his death, mourned, and then discovered to be absent from the place where his body had been laid. Other authors have likened the character of Edmund to the Judas of the four Gospels. In this interpretation, the girls Susan and Lucy who witness Aslan's death, mourn him and witness his resurrection would stand for The Three Marys of Christian tradition. Stanley Mattson, president of the Redlands, Calif.-based C.S. Lewis Foundation, states that the “Deeper Magic” referred to in the book “is all about redemption, it's all about reconciliation, it's all about healing, and it's all about . . . death being swallowed up in victory."

== Paganism ==
Lewis has also received criticism from some Christians and Christian organizations who feel that The Chronicles of Narnia promotes "soft-sell paganism and occultism", because of the recurring pagan themes and the supposedly heretical depictions of Christ as an anthropomorphic lion. The Greek god Dionysus and the Maenads are depicted in a positive light (with the caveat that meeting them without Aslan around would not be safe), although they are generally considered distinctly pagan motifs. Even an animistic "River god" is portrayed in a positive light. According to Josh Hurst of Christianity Today, "not only was Lewis hesitant to call his books Christian allegory, but the stories borrow just as much from pagan mythology as they do the Bible". His books have also been criticized by non religious critics who feel it is religious propaganda.

Lewis himself believed that pagan mythology could act as a preparation for Christianity, both in history and in the imaginative life of an individual, and even suggested that modern man was in such a lamentable state that perhaps it was necessary "first to make people good pagans, and after that to make them Christians". He also argued that imaginative enjoyment of (as opposed to belief in) classical mythology has been a feature of Christian culture through much of its history, and that European literature has always had three themes: the natural, the supernatural believed to be true (practiced religion), and the supernatural believed to be imaginary (mythology). Colin Duriez, author of three books on Lewis, suggests that Lewis believed that to reach a post-Christian culture one needed to employ pre-Christian ideas. Lewis disliked modernity, which he regarded as mechanized and sterile and cut off from natural ties to the world. By comparison, he had hardly any reservations about pre-Christian pagan culture. As Christian critics have pointed out, Lewis disdained the non-religious agnostic character of modernity, but not the polytheistic character of pagan religion.

Calormen is the only clearly pagan society within the fictional Narnian world. Calormene practices centre around Tash, a god reputed to be an ancestor of the Calormene royal family, and include lesser gods like Azaroth and Zardeenah. Journalist Sameer Rahim described Tash as "a bizarre mix of a Babylonian devil and a Hindu god" to The Telegraph, speculating that Lewis may have drawn inspiration from Hinduism and the ancient Babylonian religion. Pauline Baynes illustrated Tash as a vulture-headed deity with four arms, features that are more inspired by Hindu imagery and make him resemble the Indian god Garuda.

== Religious and secular reception ==
The initial critical reception was generally positive, and the series quickly became popular with children. In the time since then, it has become clear that reaction to the stories, both positive and negative, cuts across religious viewpoints. Although some saw in the books potential proselytising material, others insisted that non-believing audiences could enjoy the books on their own merits.

The Narnia books have a large Christian following, and are widely used to promote Christian ideas. Narnia 'tie-in' material is marketed directly to Christian, even to Sunday school, audiences. As noted above, however, a number of Christians have criticized the series for including pagan imagery, or even for misrepresenting the Christian story. Christian authors who have criticised the books include fantasy author J.K. Rowling on ethical grounds and literary critic John Goldthwaite in The Natural History of Make-Believe on the grounds that in creating the Narnia world, Lewis is "flirting with bad faith" and "playing at polytheism".

J. R. R. Tolkien was a close friend of Lewis, a fellow author and was instrumental in Lewis' own conversion to Christianity. As members of the Inklings literary group the two often read and critiqued drafts of their work. Nonetheless, Tolkien was not enthusiastic about the Narnia stories, in part due to the eclectic elements of the mythology and their haphazard incorporation, in part because he disapproved of stories involving travel between real and imaginary worlds. Though a Catholic himself, Tolkien felt that fantasy should incorporate Christian values without resorting to the obvious allegory Lewis employed.

Reaction from non-Christians has been mixed as well. Philip Pullman, an atheist supporter of secularism and humanism, has serious objections to the Narnia series. On the other hand, the books have appeared in Neo-pagan reading lists (by the Wiccan author Starhawk, among others). Positive reviews of the books by authors who share few of Lewis' religious views can be found in Revisiting Narnia, edited by Shanna Caughey.

The producers of the 2005 film hoped to tap into the large religious audience revealed by the success of Mel Gibson's film The Passion of the Christ, and at the same time hoped to produce an adventure film that would appeal to secular audiences; but they (and the reviewers as well) worried about aspects of the story that could variously alienate both groups.

Two full-length books examining Narnia from a non-religious point of view take diametrically opposite views of its literary merits. David Holbrook has written many psychoanalytic treatments of famous novelists, including Dickens, Lawrence, Lewis Carroll, and Ian Fleming. His 1991 book The Skeleton in the Wardrobe treats Narnia psychoanalytically, speculating that Lewis never recovered from the death of his mother and was frightened of adult female sexuality. He characterises the books as Lewis' failed attempt to work out many of his inner conflicts. Holbrook does give higher praise to The Magician's Nephew and Till We Have Faces (Lewis' reworking of the myth of Cupid and Psyche), as reflecting greater personal and moral maturity. Holbrook also plainly states his non-belief in Christianity.

In contrast to Holbrook, Laura Miller's The Magician's Book: A Skeptic's Guide to Narnia (2008) finds in the Narnia books a deep spiritual and moral meaning from a non-religious perspective. Blending autobiography and literary criticism, Miller (a co-founder of Salon.com) discusses how she resisted her Catholic upbringing as a child; she loved the Narnia books but felt betrayed when she discovered their Christian subtext. As an adult she found deep delight in the books, and decided that these works transcend their Christian elements. Ironically, a section in His Dark Materials by Philip Pullman, one of Narnia's severest critics, about how children acquire grace from innocence but adults from experience, had a profound influence on Miller's later appreciation of the Narnia books.

== See also ==
- Emeth
- Peter Pevensie
- Shift (Narnia)
- Tash (Narnia)
