= Stone Table =

Fictional location in The Chronicles of Narnia

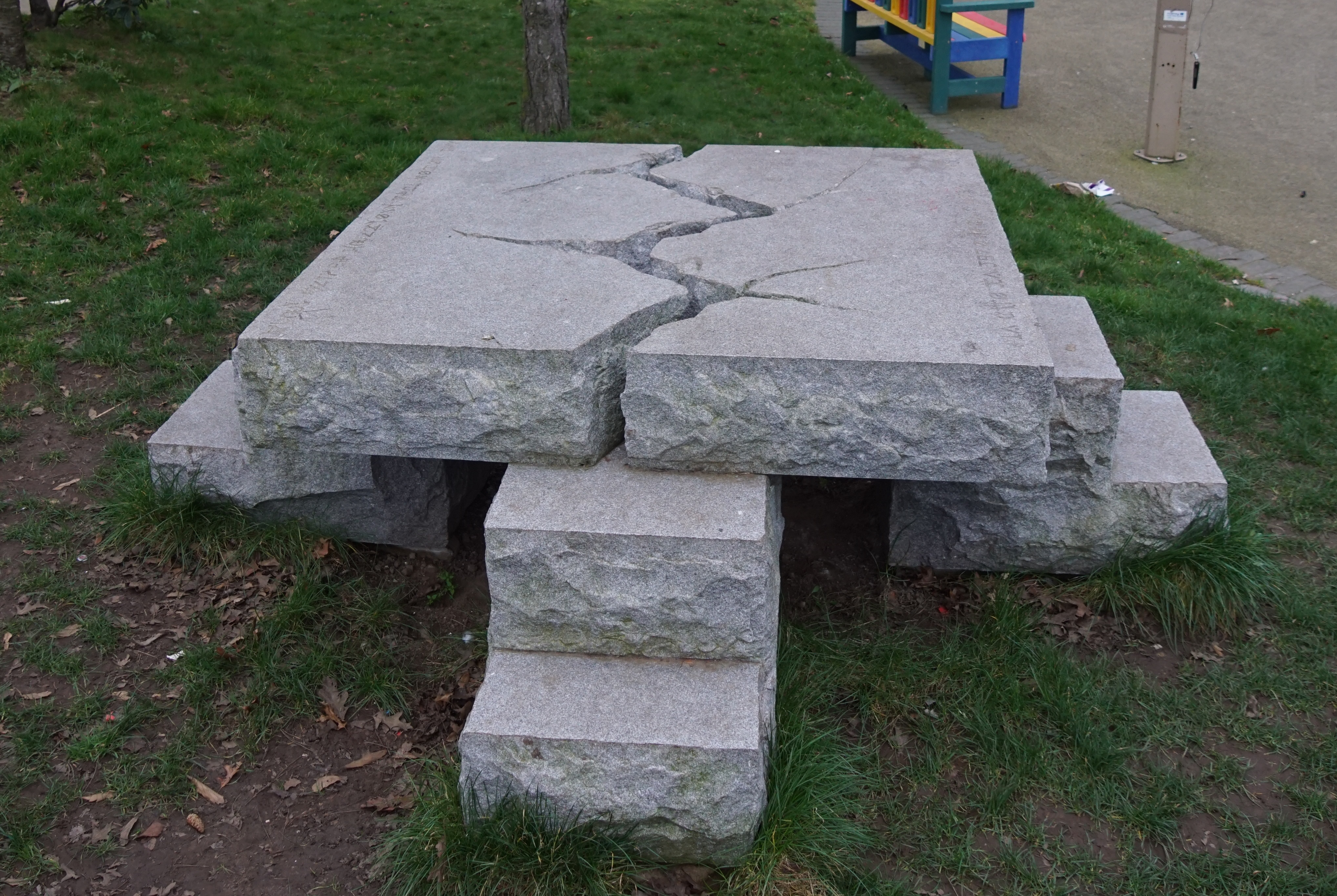
The Stone Table (by Maurice Harron (2016), CS Lewis Square, Belfast).

In C. S. Lewis's fantasy novel series the Chronicles of Narnia, the hill of the Stone Table, or Aslan's How, is a high mound or cairn, located south of the Great River in Narnia next to the Great Woods. The How was built over the hill of the Stone Table. The word how derives from the Old Norse haugr, meaning hill or mound. In parts of England, it is a synonym for barrow.

At some point during the absence of the Pevensie children, a barrow was raised over the remains of the broken Stone Table. Who built the mound, or why, is not explained by Lewis.

In Prince Caspian (1951), the runaway Prince Caspian flees into the forest from his evil uncle, King Miraz, and finds a host of good creatures and animals. When word gets out that the King's army is out to capture the Prince, he and his friends take cover inside Aslan's How. The How proves to be a reliable fortress. Miraz's army surrounds the mound and is fought off when the four Pevensies and Aslan return to Narnia.

== The Horse and His Boy ==
Aslan's How is only mentioned once more in The Horse and His Boy.

== As shown in the films ==
In the Chronicles of Narnia film series, the place is shown in various ways:

=== The Lion, the Witch and the Wardrobe ===
In The Lion, the Witch, and the Wardrobe, the Stone Table is the sacred place where Aslan is killed by the White Witch. Around the edges of the table is writing, possibly Narnian, and extremely old. In the movie, Edmund Pevensie had committed a sin against his siblings by telling Jadis about them on the premise that he would be king of Narnia. However, Jadis throws him in prison and he is later rescued by Aslan's army. The White Witch then travels to Aslan's camp where she states that the "blood of any traitor is" hers. She and Aslan have a private parley and it is later revealed that Aslan has saved Edmund by offering himself to Jadis.

That night, Aslan, along with Susan and Lucy, travel to the Stone Table. Aslan tells the girls to turn and go back, not telling them what is about to happen. However the girls disobey and watch as Aslan is tied, his mane cut off, and he is bound to the Stone Table. Jadis then gives a speech and stabs Aslan, killing him with Susan and Lucy looking on from the woods.

After Jadis and her army leave, the girls walk over to look at the dead Aslan. As they sit there, mice begin gnawing on the ropes that bound the lion. The girls fall asleep. The next morning, Lucy and Susan decide to return to their camp and prepare to face the White Witch. As they are leaving, there is a small earthquake and a loud crumbling sound. When they turn, the see the Stone Table broken in half and Aslan gone. Confused, the girls begin to wonder what happened to Aslan, until they see him walking up behind the table, backlit by the rising sun. Susan and Lucy run over and hug Aslan, who explains that the White Witch had misinterpreted the meaning of the Deep Magic. According to it, a person (or creature) who had committed no sin and sacrificed him or herself could reverse death.

=== Prince Caspian ===
For Prince Caspian, set 1300 years after The Lion, the Witch, and the Wardrobe, the Stone Table is enshrined in a massive stone structure built sometime after the Pevensies left Narnia. The structure, known as Aslan's How, is entered via a ramp. There seems to be a main chamber in the front where Caspian's army congregates. There is a tunnel leading off of this chamber, lined with carvings and paintings of the Pevensies as kings and queens, one of Mr. Tumnus, and one of Lucy and Susan riding on Aslan, as seen in the first movie. The tunnel ends in the antechamber where the Stone Table resides. A trough containing a flammable substance is used for lighting. On the back wall of the chamber is a relief carving of Aslan.

The Table chamber is the location for Caspian and the Pevensies to meet to discuss the plan for battle. At one point, a hag and a werewolf somehow manage to enter the chamber to persuade Caspian that Jadis, the White Witch killed by Aslan in the first movie, is the only one to provide the means to win the battle. Caspian agrees, and the hag uses Jadis's wand to create a wall of ice. When Jadis appears, she asks Caspian for a drop of blood to bring her back; however, Peter appears and pushes him away. Yet Peter himself is enchanted by Jadis and shows himself willing to give her some of his blood. At the last second, Edmund stabs the block of ice from behind, "killing" Jadis.

== Symbolism and theological significance ==
C.S. Lewis often incorporates Christian themes and symbols into the Narnian stories. The Stone Table itself (and not the hill) is one of these symbols: it is symbolic of the cross of Jesus, and the killing of Aslan on it for the sin (treachery) of Edmund Pevensie, alludes to the crucifixion of Christ.

== See also ==
- The Lion, the Witch and the Wardrobe
- The Chronicles of Narnia: The Lion, the Witch and the Wardrobe (film)
- Prince Caspian
- The Chronicles of Narnia: Prince Caspian (film)
- Religion in The Chronicles of Narnia
- Aslan
- Lucy Pevensie
- Susan Pevensie
- White Witch
