= Rabadash =

Character in The Chronicles of Narnia

- Narnia character

In-universe information
- Race: Human
- Title: Prince (later Tisroc)
- Nationality: Calormen

Prince Rabadash is a human character and the main antagonist in C. S. Lewis's fantasy novel The Horse and His Boy. Rabadash is the heir to the throne of Calormen, being the eldest son of the Tisroc. In The Horse and His Boy, he attempts to conquer Archenland, the neighbouring country of Narnia, but is thwarted by King Edmund and Queen Lucy of Narnia, with help from a boy named Shasta. His name seems to be derived from Rab adaşı, Turkish for the somewhat blasphemous title, "namesake of the Lord" or "namesake of God".

== Character history ==
Rabadash goes to war because he is unsuccessful in courting Queen Susan of Narnia. It is revealed that he and his retinue visited Susan at Cair Paravel, where he impressed the Queen. On Susan's return visit to Tashbaan, the capital of Calormen, accompanied by her brother King Edmund, she learns that Rabadash is a proud and cruel man, and fears (correctly) that he intends to take her by force if necessary. Susan, Edmund, and their followers escape from Tashbaan. Rabadash, spoiled, angry, and with an injured masculine pride to nurse, seeks permission from his father to lead a small force of cavalry to Narnia, to abduct Susan when she returns to Cair Paravel. This is to be preceded by surprising and capturing Anvard, the capital of Archenland, which, if successful, will also give Calormen a forward base from which to later invade Narnia. The Tisroc does not publicly support Rabadash's move, reasoning that it would be diplomatically inconvenient to be seen to order an unprovoked attack on a neighbouring country, particularly a country patronized by a being as powerful as Aslan; should Rabadash fail, the Tisroc could simply deny any knowledge or approval of his eldest son's actions, avoiding conflict. He also sees that Rabadash's hotheadedness and ambition are dangerous to himself. The Tisroc would rather see Rabadash expend his energies and ambitions, and even be killed abroad than stay at home and plot to seize the throne from him before his time, as has happened to previous Tisrocs. Before Rabadash left, his father made it clear that he would neither avenge his son nor rescue him should he be killed or captured, and if the prince spilled any more Narnian blood than necessary and open war arises from it, then regardless of the campaign's success or failure, Rabadash would be stripped of his status as the heir to the throne.

In the scene where the Tisroc, the Vizier, and Prince Rabadash secretly discuss his proposal for attacking, the Vizier and his father the Tisroc use several proverbs that Lewis created (Unseth 2011). Rabadash, impatient, hot-headed and intellectually clumsy, cannot hold his own in such a conversation and complains, "I have had maxims and verses flung at me all day."

Rabadash proceeds to take his force of cavalry into Archenland. But King Lune and the knights of his house are warned of the invasion by Shasta, and escape into Anvard. Rabadash, rather than recognising that his plan has failed, lays siege to the castle. Shasta meanwhile crosses the mountains into Narnia, where, on hearing his news, Edmund and Lucy lead an expeditionary force to Anvard. Rabadash's army, outnumbered and taken by surprise, is badly defeated, and Rabadash is taken prisoner and brought before Lune's judgment.

At the end of The Horse and His Boy, Aslan gives the captured Rabadash a chance to repent and accept the mercy of Lune, who has decided to release him on certain conditions. When Rabadash refuses, Aslan transforms him into a donkey. Aslan then decrees that Rabadash must return to the temple of Tash in Tashbaan and stand before the altar at the time of the autumn feast, when thousands of his subjects will be watching. If this is done, he will regain his human shape. However, he must live within ten miles of the temple. If he were to risk leaving that area, he would risk being transformed into a donkey a second time, with no hope of ever changing back. Because he cannot leave Tashbaan, unable to declare war while fearing that any who gain glory might overthrow him, Rabadash's reign upon assuming the throne is described as incredibly peaceful as he was labeled "Rabadash the Peacemaker" to his subjects. But as his people never forgot his humiliating transformation, they called him "Rabadash the Ridiculous" behind his back and after his death while calling any fool a "second Rabadash".

== Reception ==
In an article for Houston Christian University, Rabadash is described as "a supreme bully", "cruel" and "spoiled", and although his comeuppance may not seem "more than a simple revenge fantasy" it actually illustrates a passage from Romans 12 about overcoming evil with good. This ties to Rabadash not being killed but chastened, which ensured Narnia's stability.
