= Aravis =

Character from The Horse and His Boy

- Narnia character

In-universe information
- Race: Human
- Title: Aravis Tarkheena / Queen of Archenland
- Family: Kidrash Tarkaan (father); Two brothers, unnamed Rishti Tarkaan (grandfather); Kidrash Tarkan (great-grandfather); Illsombreh Tisroc (great-great-grandfather); Ardeeb Tisroc (great-great-great-grandfather); Tash (claimed ancestor); King Lune (father-in-law); Corin (brother-in-law)
- Spouse: Prince Cor
- Children: Ram the Great
- Nationality: Calormene (later Archenlandish)

Aravis is a fictional character in the 1954 novel The Horse and His Boy by C. S. Lewis.

Aravis is a young Tarkheena, a female member of the ruling nobility of Calormen. With her horse, Hwin, who is eventually revealed to be a talking beast from the land of Narnia, she flees her home, to escape an arranged marriage with Ahoshta Tarkaan. Aravis is a strong character whose confidence, bravery, and loyalty are offset by arrogance and self-centeredness. She is also said to be an amazing storyteller, which is partly the result of her upbringing: the art of telling stories forms part of the education of the nobility. On their journey north to freedom in Narnia, they fall into company with the talking stallion, Bree, and the boy Shasta. Aravis overhears a plot by the Calormenes to invade Archenland and Narnia, and with this intelligence, the four companions can warn the Archenlanders in time to thwart the invasion. In the process of their adventures, through a series of "lessons" and encounters, Aravis's character is transformed, and she acquires humility and sensitivity. Her companion, Shasta, is discovered to be the lost heir to the kingdom of Archenland, and, upon reaching adulthood, he and Aravis marry, and rule as king and queen. They are the parents of Ram the Great, the "most famous of all the kings of Archenland".

== Fictional character biography ==
In The Horse and His Boy, C. S. Lewis describes Aravis as "the only daughter of Kidrash Tarkaan, the son of Rishti Tarkaan, the son of Kidrash Tarkaan, the son of Illsombreh Tisroc, the son of Ardeeb Tisroc, who was descended in a right line from the god Tash."

Aravis has spent her youth in the heart of Calormen, presumably in Calavar, the province over which her father is lord. Her mother died of unknown causes, and her older brother, to whom she was devoted, was killed fighting rebels in "the western wars". Her father has recently married an unkind woman, who makes no attempt to disguise her dislike for her stepdaughter. Aravis also has a younger brother who is "but a child". Her already difficult home life is rendered impossible when her father announces her engagement to Ahoshta Tarkaan, a wealthy and powerful but loathsome courtier whom she despises. In response, she decides to commit suicide. However, her mare, Hwin, reveals herself as a talking horse from Narnia and persuades her to flee to Narnia instead.

As the two ride through Calormen, they meet Bree and Shasta, the eponymous horse and boy, who are also escaping to Narnia. The four try to traverse Calormen's capital of Tashbaan undetected, but they are separated. Aravis meets her friend Lasaraleen, who is also a Tarkheena. Aravis and Lasaraleen explore the Tisroc's palace, and accidentally overhear a plan by the Tisroc and his son Crown Prince Rabadash to invade Archenland. When Aravis meets Shasta and the horses again at the tombs of the ancient rulers of Calormen, they agree they must urgently warn Narnia and Archenland.

As they near the border of Archenland, they are chased by a lion who slashes Aravis's back. Her wounds force her to remain with the Hermit of the Southern March while Shasta goes alone to complete the mission. She watches the battle through the Hermit's magic pool, appalled at the danger that Shasta faces. While in the hermit's home, Aravis encounters Aslan, an event that changes her, as Aravis also learns that Aslan was the lion who slashed her in the back in retribution for the punishment administered to her slave-maid (whom Aravis dosed with a sleeping draught in order to escape).

Shasta is recognized as Cor, the eldest son of King Lune of Archenland, and Aravis comes to live at the castle of Anvard with the royal family. Many years later, Cor and Aravis marry, and she becomes queen of Archenland and mother of Ram the Great.

The character Aravis last appears in the book The Last Battle, attending the Great Reunion in Aslan's Country along with her husband, father-in-law, brother-in-law, and son.

== Race issues ==
Several writers, including Philip Pullman, Kyrie O'Connor, and Gregg Easterbrook, consider the use of Calormene characters as villains to be evidence of racism. Aravis is often presented as a counterexample to this (along with Emeth, who is accepted in Aslan's country for good deeds worthy of Aslan), since she is sympathetically portrayed as a largely virtuous Calormene heroine.
