= Pevensie =

Pevensie is the surname of some of the primary characters in some of C. S. Lewis' The Chronicles of Narnia books:

- Edmund Pevensie
- Lucy Pevensie
- Peter Pevensie
- Susan Pevensie

== See also ==
- Pevensey, village
