= Tirian =

Fictional character in The Chronicles of Narnia

- Narnia character

In-universe information
- Race: Human
- Title: King of Narnia
- Family: Erlian (father); See descendants of Caspian
- Nationality: Narnian

King Tirian (born between 2530 and 2535, Narnian time) is a fictional character from C. S. Lewis's fantasy series The Chronicles of Narnia. He is the protagonist of The Last Battle, in which he is the last King of Narnia, who has to defend his kingdom against subversion and invasion. He is well respected by the Narnians and a skilled swordsman. He is descended from Prince Caspian, and is the son of King Erlian. His closest friend is Jewel the Unicorn.

Troubles in Narnia cause King Tirian to doubt the purported return of Aslan. Enraged at Calormene treatment of a talking beast, he and Jewel slay the men but are then filled with guilt at this act and surrender to the Calormene enclave and are imprisoned by an evil and ambitious ape called Shift. There Tirian witnesses the fraudulent exhibition of a fake 'Aslan', and then is sentenced to death by Shift. But he prays for Aslan or the friends of Narnia to come to save Narnia, and Eustace and Jill come to his rescue.

He leads an assault upon the Calormenes at the stable and, on the verge of defeat, wrestles their leader Rishda Tarkaan into the stable to meet Tash. There he finds himself in Aslan's Country, meets High King Peter, King Edmund, Lord Digory, Lady Polly and Queen Lucy, and bears witness to the end of Narnia.

Regnal titles
Preceded by Erlian	King of Narnia ?-2555	Succeeded by End of Narnia
