= Calormen =

Fictional country in The Chronicles of Narnia by C.S. Lewis

- The Chronicles of Narnia location
- Created by: C. S. Lewis
- Genre: Children's fantasy

In-universe information
- Other name: Calormene Empire
- Type: Empire
- Ruled by: Tisroc
- Ethnic group: Calormenes
- Location: Narnia
- Locations: Tashbaan (capital)
- Characters: Rabadash, Aravis, Emeth
- Currency: Crescent

In C. S. Lewis's Chronicles of Narnia series of novels, Calormen (/kəˈlɔːrmən/) is a large country to the southeast of Narnia. Lewis probably derived its name from the Latin calor, meaning "heat". When using the name as an adjective or an ethnonym, Lewis spelled the name with an 'e' at the end: a Calormene (/kəˈlɔːrmən/) soldier; "The Calormenes have dark faces and long beards."

Narnia and Calormen are separated by the country of Archenland and a large desert. In The Horse and His Boy, Calormen is described as being many times the size of its northern neighbours, and it is implied that its army is always either conquering more land or keeping down rebellions, in wars with which neither Narnia nor Archenland are involved. The border of the Calormene Empire extends from the Western Mountains to the Great Eastern Ocean. The Calormene capital is Tashbaan, a large walled city located on an island hill at the mouth of a river and close to the northern desert.

== History ==
The country of Calormen was first mentioned by Lewis in a passing reference in chapter 2 of Prince Caspian, though in the first edition it was spelt Kalormen. He first wrote about Calormene characters in the subsequent Voyage of the Dawn Treader, though neither of these is their first chronological appearance in the series. They are presented with the following words: "The Calormenes have dark faces and long beards. They wear flowing robes and orange-coloured turbans, and they are a wise, wealthy, courteous, cruel and ancient people". As narrated in that book, after the Telmarine kings cut Narnia off from the sea, the Lone Islands—though in theory remaining a Narnian possession—fell into the Calormene sphere of influence, becoming a major source of slaves for Calormen and adopting the Calormene Crescent as the islands' currency. After Caspian the Seafarer restored Narnian rule and abolished slavery in the islands, there was some apprehension of Calormen resorting to war to regain its influence there. The book's plot then moves away and it remains unknown whether such a war took place. However, Lewis later placed Calormen at the focus of The Horse and His Boy, set a thousand years earlier, at the time of High King Peter.

The origins of Calormen and the Calormenes are not made clear during the Chronicles. According to the Narnian timeline published by Walter Hooper, Calormen was founded by Archen outlaws, who traveled over the Great Desert to the south some 24 years after Archenland's founding. In an alternative theory, Calormen was founded by people accidentally crossing into Calormen from our world through a Middle Eastern portal (similar to the English wardrobe in The Lion, The Witch and the Wardrobe), which was subsequently lost or destroyed, preventing their return. The Calormenes speak a flowery version of the standard English favoured by both human and animal Narnians, which might support this argument; however, Jadis also speaks English. The reason for the ancient Arabian, Persian, Moorish, Mughal, and Ottoman Turkish aspects of Calormene culture, or the origin of their religion, was not satisfactorily explained, but stand in strong counterpoint to the largely European, Anglo and Greco-Roman (and Christian) aspects of Narnia and Archenland.

Throughout the times covered by the Chronicles of Narnia, Calormen and Narnia maintain an uneasy, albeit generally peaceable, coexistence. The Horse and His Boy and The Last Battle contain plot lines that focus on Calormen, while some of the other books have peripheral references. In The Horse and His Boy the main characters (one a young member of the Calormene nobility) escape from Calormen to Archenland and Narnia whilst the Calormene cavalry under Prince Rabadash attempts to invade Narnia and capture the Narnian Queen Susan for his bride. The rather small (200 horse) Calormene invasion force is rebuffed at the gates of the Kingdom of Archenland. In The Last Battle is a reference to King Erlian having fought a war with the Calormenes. King Tirian is—until the events narrated in the book—at peace with them, and some level of trade and travel exist between Narnia and Calormen. The Narnian King maintains a supply of Calormene armour and weapons for the purpose of conducting undercover operations in their country, suggesting a kind of cold war.

Calormenes are described as dark-skinned, with the men mostly bearded. Flowing robes, turbans and wooden shoes with an upturned point at the toe are common items of clothing, and the preferred weapon is the scimitar. Lavish palaces are present in the Calormene capital Tashbaan. The overall leitmotif of Calormene culture is portrayed as ornate to the point of ostentation. The people of Calormen are concerned with maintaining honour and precedent, often speaking in maxims and quoting their ancient poets. Veneration of elders and absolute deference to power are marks of Calormene society. Power and wealth determine class and social standing, and slavery is commonplace. The unit of currency is the Crescent. Narnians hold Calormenes in disdain for their treatment of animals and slaves. Conversely, Calormenes refer to the human inhabitants of Narnia as "barbarians". All of this appears quite consistent with the Osmanli Turkish Ottoman Empire (1299-1923), its known and purported splendor, rigid class structure, and the always-volatile relationship with many of its European neighbors.

The ruler of Calormen is called the Tisroc and is believed by the Calormene people to have descended in a direct line from the god Tash, whom the people worship in addition to other gods and goddesses. The illustrations of Tash, a vulture headed god, by Pauline Baynes appear to be inspired by Hindu as opposed to Islamic imagery, with multiple arms and a distinct resemblance to the ancient Indian deity Garuda. Calormenes always follow a mention of the Tisroc with the phrase "may he live forever". Ranking below the Tisroc are his sons (princes), a Grand Vizier, and the noble classes, who are addressed as Tarkaan (male) and Tarkheena (female). The nobility have a band of gold on their arm and their marriages are usually arranged at a young age. Beneath them are soldiers of the empire's vast army, merchants, and the peasantry, with slaves being the lowest rung on the social ladder. The Calormene leaders are portrayed as quite war-like, and the Tisrocs generally seem to have a wish to conquer the "barbarian" lands to their north, to some degree deterred, however, by the magical reputation of the countries, their various rulers and their being known to be under the protection of Aslan. Significantly, the final, successful invasion of Narnia by the Calormene military, which precipitates the end of the Narnian universe, was conducted in close cooperation with the appearance of the false Aslan and the proclamation that Aslan and Tash are one and the same.

Calormene social and political institutions are depicted as essentially unchanged between the time of The Horse and His Boy and The Last Battle—more than a thousand years, in which Narnia has profoundly changed several times. This is clearly an artifact of the order in which C. S. Lewis wrote and published the stories, with the two stories above and The Magician's Nephew which also references ancient Mesopotamian civilisation in its depiction of Queen Jadis and Charn, appearing last three of the seven.

When at the end of The Last Battle the characters cross into the Real Narnia and find there the counterparts of all the places they had known in the destroyed Narnia, there is a reference to a counterpart of Calormen being also there to its south, complete with the capital Tashbaan—presumably without the nastier aspects of Calormene culture, but this is not discussed in detail.

== Tashbaan ==
The capital of Calormen is the walled city of Tashbaan, situated on a river mouth located on the southern verge of the great desert dividing the empire from the northern states of Narnia and Archenland.

Tashbaan is described as one of the wonders of the world. The city is a hot and crowded place, though with fine streets, magnificent palaces, and gardens. It is built on a natural slope, rising to the palace of the Tisroc and the great Temple of Tash at the pinnacle of the hill. The palace of the Tisroc is referred to as being magnificent beyond description and opens onto gardens that run right down to the river wall. Tashbaan is surrounded by a strong wall that rises out of the water and is reached by long bridges from both banks, providing the only place where crossing the great river of Calormen is possible for many miles. The banks of the river are lined with gardens and country houses. The Tombs of the Ancient Kings, believed by the Carlomenes to be haunted, lie directly across the river from Tashbaan, on the edge of the desert.

== Calormene Poetry ==
The poetry of Calormen is prolix, sententious, and moralizing. Quotations from Calormen poets are often quoted as proverbs. These include such as the following:

Application to business
is the root of prosperity
but those who ask questions
that do not concern them
are steering the ship of folly
towards the rock of indigence.

Natural affection is stronger than soup
and offspring more precious than carbuncles.

He who attempts to deceive the judicious
is already baring his back for the scourge.

Swords can be kept off with shields
but the Eye of Wisdom pierces through every defence.

Deep draughts from the fountain of reason are desirable
in order to extinguish the fire of youthful love.

Calormenes disparage Narnian poetry, contending that it is all about things like love and war and not about useful maxims, but when the Calormen-raised Cor and Aravis first hear Narnian (or Cor's native Archenlandish) poetry they find it much more exciting. Calormen also prizes the art of story-telling, which, according to Lewis, forms part of the education of the nobility. The talking horse Bree, though not fond of most things Calormene, thoroughly enjoys a story told in Calormene style by Aravis. He also has the habit of rolling like inarticulate Calormene horses.

== Concepts of freedom and slavery ==
In The Horse and His Boy, Lewis uses the cultural settings of Narnia, Archenland, and Calormen to develop a theme of freedom in contrast to slavery. Lewis depicts the Calormene culture as one in which a primary guiding principle is that the weak must make way for the strong:

For in Tashbaan there is only one traffic regulation, which is that everyone who is less important has to get out of the way for everyone who is more important; unless you want a cut from a whip or a punch from the butt end of a spear.

He also reveals the motivation for Calormene attempts to invade Archenland and, ultimately, Narnia, as a refusal to abide the thought of free countries so close to the border of the Calormene empire, as illustrated by this speech given by the Tisroc:

"These little barbarian countries that call themselves free (which is as much to say, idle, disordered, and unprofitable) are hateful to the gods and to all persons of discernment."

In contrast, the kings and queens of Narnia and Archenland, as rulers of free people, hold themselves responsible for the well-being of their subjects. As King Lune tells Shasta/Cor:

"For this is what it means to be a king: to be first in every desperate attack and last in every desperate retreat, and when there's hunger in the land (as must be now and then in bad years) to wear finer clothes and laugh louder over a scantier meal than any man in your land."

== Accusations of racism ==
C. S. Lewis has been accused of racism, particularly in his depiction of the Calormenes. In the Companion to Narnia, the Catholic theologian Paul F. Ford wrote "C. S. Lewis was a man of his time and socioeconomic class. Like many English men of this era, Lewis was unconsciously but regrettably unsympathetic to things and people Middle Eastern. Thus he sometimes engages in exaggerated stereotyping in contrasting things Narnian and things Calormene. He intends this in a broadly comic way, almost vaudevillian. But in our post-September 11, 2001, world, he would, I am sure, want to reconsider this insensitivity." Outspoken atheist critic and novelist Philip Pullman has called the Chronicles of Narnia "blatantly racist" and in an interview with The Observer, criticised the film adaptation of The Lion, the Witch and the Wardrobe by saying the books contained "a peevish blend of racist, misogynistic, and reactionary prejudice".

Calormenes live south of a desert, wear turbans and pointed shoes, their noblemen are called Tarkaans (similar to the medieval Central Asian title tarkhan), they are armed with scimitars, and their money is called "crescents".

Of Lewis, Kyrie O'Connor writes: "In his time, people thought it was amusing to make fun of other cultures. We don't. Read the stories, ask questions, and remember that the person who wrote this story was altogether too human." Claims of racism can be seen as countered by Lewis's positive portrayal of two Calormenes and the lack of racism shown to them by Narnian nobility. Lewis writes in The Last Battle that those who worship Tash and who are virtuous are in fact worshipping Aslan, and those who are immoral and who worship Aslan are in fact worshipping Tash:

I and [Tash] are of such different kinds that no service which is vile can be done to me, and none which is not vile can be done to him.

== In foreign languages ==
In the Russian translation of the Narnia books, Calormen is known as "Tarkhistan" (Тархистан), as a reference to the Tarkaan nobles and its Turkish and Persian cultural influences.

== See also ==
- Haradrim - A similar Persian-influenced civilisation that appears in the books of fellow Inkling J. R. R. Tolkien.
- Saracens
