= Tash (Narnia) =

Fictional deity in The Chronicles of Narnia

- Narnia character
- Tash the inexorable, the irresistible, as illustrated by Pauline Baynes in The Last Battle

In-universe information
- Race: Deity
- Family: the Tisrocs and Tarkaans and Tarkheenas (claim descendants)
- Children: The first Tisroc (Claimed)
- Nationality: Calormen

Tash is a fictional deity and demonic god, found in C. S. Lewis's Chronicles of Narnia series. He is an antagonist in the novels The Horse and His Boy and The Last Battle.

Tash is the patron god of the ruling class of Calormen. The Calormene capital is named Tashbaan, and the Tisrocs and Tarkaans and Tarkheenas all claim descent from Tash. The worship of Tash is the only formal religion depicted in the world of Narnia, except that the people of Narnia honour the memory of Aslan, a great lion who was killed and returned from the dead many generations before. There are temples to Tash, Calormenes regularly use ritual phrases such as "Tash the inexorable, the irresistible" and "Tash preserve us", and he is the only being referred to by any character in the books as a god. At the end of the series, Tash is revealed as the antithesis of Aslan (who represents Jesus), and appears as a terrible demon, with a skeletal, humanoid body, a vulture-like head, and four arms with talons.

== Appearances ==
=== The Horse and His Boy ===
In The Horse and His Boy, which explores Calormene society in some depth, the name of Tash is frequently used in oaths and exclamations. (Two other Calormene gods are mentioned, Azaroth and Zardeenah, Lady of the Night and Maidens, but only briefly.) However, Tash is not described at all, and his worship plays little part in the story. Near the end of the novel, the principal antagonist Rabadash, frustrated and maddened by defeat, tries to call on Tash to inflict vengeance on the Narnians and Aslan, such as "lightning in the shape of scorpions". But this results in nothing but mockery and pity from his captors, because Aslan, after repeatedly warning Rabadash to repent of his anger, turns Rabadash into a donkey. Aslan tells Rabadash that his transformation will be lifted when he visits the temple of Tash in Tashbaan during the middle of a festival (meaning he'll be seen changing back by thousands of people), and that afterwards he must never stray more than ten miles from the temple or he will be transformed again, this time with no ability to return to his human self.

=== The Last Battle ===
The worship of Tash persists in The Last Battle, the final book of the series, in which he is depicted as a very real and malevolent being who is the antithesis of Aslan. Narnians distastefully describe him as a god or a demon. Tash appears much larger than a man, with four arms and the head of a vulture; his presence brings cold and the stench of death. While the Calormenes offer human sacrifice to Tash, a majority did not actually believe in him. Illustrations by Pauline Baynes enhance his macabre appearance.

"It was roughly the shape of a man but it had the head of a bird; some bird of prey with a cruel, curved beak. It had four arms which it held high above its head, stretching them out Northward as if it wanted to snatch all Narnia in its grip; and its fingers — all twenty of them — were curved like its beak and had long, pointed bird-like claws instead of nails."

— The first description of Tash The Last Battle

In the course of the story, the Calormene warlord Rishda schemes with Shift the manipulative ape and Ginger the duplicitous cat to concoct a story that Aslan and Tash are the same being, called "Tashlan". Many Narnians see that this is ridiculous, given the antithetical nature of Aslan and Tash. King Tirian of Narnia, with two of Narnia's English friends, Eustace Scrubb and Jill Pole, attempt to defend Aslan and Narnia, but they are overpowered by the Calormene soldiers. The conspirators send dissenters "to meet Tashlan" in the stable of Puzzle the donkey, where Calormene soldiers can secretly murder them.

Through these evil actions, the conspirators have unwittingly summoned Tash himself into Narnia. Ginger encounters Tash and barely escapes, but loses the power of speech. A devout Calormene soldier named Emeth enters the stable voluntarily, determined to meet his god. He vanishes into Aslan's Country, where he meets Aslan and realizes where his true devotion lies. Aslan tells him that "all the service thou hast done to Tash, I accept as service done to me", and further explains that "no service which is vile can be done to me, and none which is not vile can be done to him". He explains that Emeth's pious devotion, because it was rooted in a love of justice and truth, was really to Aslan rather than to Tash.

Tirian manages to throw Shift into the stable, and Tash devours the ape. Rishda takes fright at this, and hastily attempts to placate Tash by offering the remaining Narnians as sacrifices, but Tirian drags Rishda into the stable, where Tash seizes him. In the name of Aslan and the Emperor-Beyond-the-Sea, High King Peter banishes Tash back to his own realm. Tash vanishes, carrying Rishda in his clutches.

== Character analysis ==
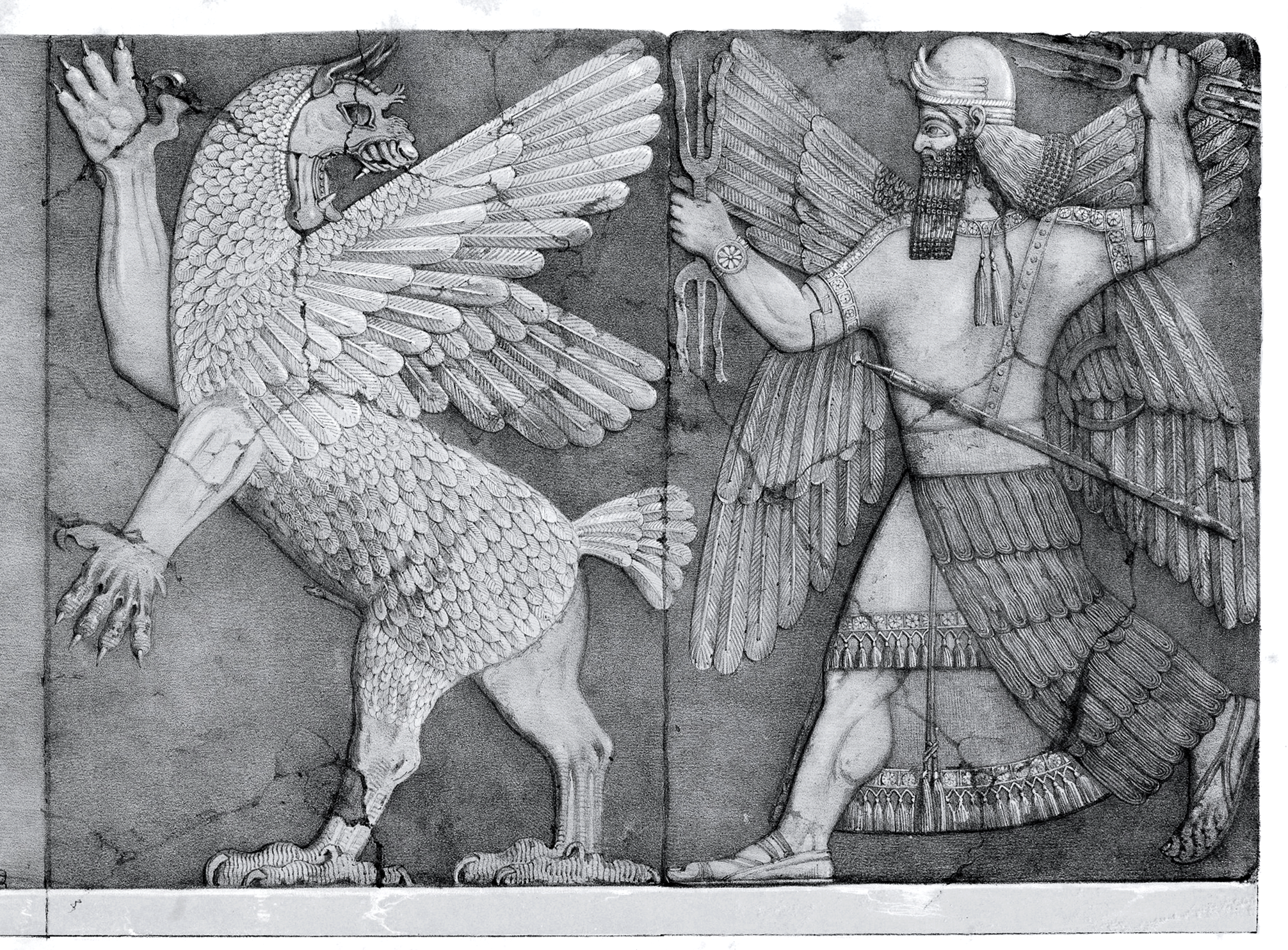
Assyrian stone relief from Nineveh depicting an evil-looking deity (left; actually the sun god Shamash), with some similarities to Tash.

Tash is an incidental character during The Horse and His Boy, but becomes an important character during the narrative of The Last Battle when he "follows his worshippers into Narnia." Michael Ward notes that Tash's arrival in Narnia is part of the "deadly atmosphere" pervading The Last Battle. "At the appearance of Tash, Puzzle complains, 'It's so cold." However other commentators view the introduction of Tash in The Last Battle as a type of deus ex machina, "swooping in from left-field" to threaten Narnia.

=== Religious analysis ===
Imran Ahmad writing in the Huffington Post describes how the presentation of Tash in The Last Battle intersects with how some Evangelical Christians view Islam. "Shift puts out the (obviously untrue) assertion that 'Aslan and Tash are the same'. In this, I hear echoes of the old argument: Muslims propose that God and Allah are the same; evangelical Christians vehemently oppose this." Paul Simpson in his guide to Lewis's writings notes that "the discussion whether Tash and Aslan are the same is one of the underlying themes of the book." But some other commentators view Tash as derivative from other religious sources. For example, Sameer Rahim writing for The Telegraph describes Tash as "a bizarre concoction of Babylonian devil and Hindu god" (often portrayed as four-armed).
