= Shasta (Narnia) =

Fictional character in Narnia

Cor/Shasta
- Narnia character
- First appearance: The Horse and His Boy (1954)

In-universe information
- Race: Human
- Title: King of Archenland
- Family: King Lune (father); Unnamed mother; Corin (twin brother)
- Spouse: Aravis Tarkheena
- Children: Ram the Great
- Nationality: Archenland

Shasta, later known as Cor of Archenland, is a fictional character in C. S. Lewis' Chronicles of Narnia. He is the principal character in the fifth book published in the series, The Horse and His Boy. The book's events, however, are chronologically third in the series. He also appears briefly at the end of The Last Battle, the seventh and final book in the series.

Born as the eldest son and heir of King Lune of Archenland, and elder identical twin of Prince Corin, Shasta/Cor was kidnapped as an infant and raised as a fisherman's son in the country of Calormen. In The Horse and his Boy (the events of which all occur during the reign of the four Pevensie children in Narnia, an era which begins and ends in the last chapter of The Lion, the Witch and the Wardrobe), Shasta/Cor escapes to freedom, saves Archenland and Narnia from invasion, learns his true identity, and is restored to his heritage. Shasta's companions on his journey are the talking horses, Bree, and Hwin, and the Calormene Tarkheena, Aravis. Shasta/Cor grows up to become King of Archenland, marries Aravis, and fathers the next (and "most famous") king of Archenland, Ram the Great.

== Biographical summary ==
Cor is raised under the name Shasta by a poor fisherman named Arsheesh, who lives on the coast of Calormen, a great and powerful land to the south of Narnia, beyond Archenland and the Great Desert. Harshly treated, Shasta believes that Arsheesh is his father until he overhears the fisherman negotiating to sell him as a slave to a Tarkaan (a Calormene nobleman). He discovers that Arsheesh found him as a baby in a rowboat washed up on the beach. Shasta goes to the stable and starts talking to the Tarkaan's horse there. To his surprise, the horse answers, warning Shasta that his new master is cruel and suggesting that both horse and boy escape together to Narnia, a land of freedom where nearly all the animals talk.

Shasta agrees, and he and the horse, nicknamed Bree, start off that night. They encounter another pair of fugitives, a Tarkheena named Aravis and her talking horse Hwin. They make their way to Tashbaan, Calormen's capital city, where Shasta is mistaken by a visiting Narnian party for Prince Corin of Archenland, whom he strongly resembles.

Learning that Prince Rabadash of Calormen is planning to invade Archenland as a step to conquering Narnia, Shasta and his companions set off to warn Archenland. After a grueling journey across the desert, a tired and barefoot Shasta successfully warns the Archenlanders. Riding with the Archenlanders, he becomes lost in dense fog, but is then guided by the great lion Aslan through a mountain pass into Narnia, where his warning musters a force of Narnians to come to the aid of their allies. At Corin's urging, Shasta participates in the battle to defeat Rabadash and his Calormen horsemen.

Shasta then discovers who he really is: Prince Cor of Archenland, elder son of King Lune, Corin's twin brother, and heir apparent to the throne. When he was a baby, a prophecy predicted that he would save Archenland from a great danger, leading domestic enemies of King Lune to kidnap him. When his father pursued their ship, the kidnappers put the baby prince on a rowboat with a knight. This was the boat in which Arsheesh found him. The knight had died, but Aslan guided the boat to shore so that Cor could survive.

The prophecy was fulfilled when he alerted both the Archenlanders and their Narnian friends of the Calormen invasion. Cor is reunited with his father and brother (his mother having died sometime before), and Aravis comes to live with them at the castle of Anvard. Cor and Aravis eventually marry, and their son Ram the Great becomes (we are told) the greatest king of Archenland.

King Cor, King Lune, Queen Aravis, and Prince Corin Thunder-Fist are all mentioned as present in the second Narnia at the end of The Last Battle.

Cor is a direct descendant (via Col, the second son of Frank V of Narnia) of King Frank I of Narnia, who was born on Earth in England.
