= George Claydon =

British actor (1933–2001)

- Born: 4 September 1933; Bristol, England
- Died: 4 October 2001 (aged 68); London, England
- Occupation: Actor
- Years active: 1963–1989

George Claydon (4 September 1933 – 4 October 2001) was a British actor notable for his dwarfism. His television roles included that of Photographer George in The Beatles' Magical Mystery Tour, a television film that initially aired on BBC1 on Boxing Day 1967, Ginaarbrik in the 1967 ITV adaptation of The Lion, the Witch and the Wardrobe (1967) (which he followed by playing Nikabrik many years later in the 1989 BBC adaptation of Prince Caspian), and the miniseries The Last Days of Pompeii (1984). His film appearances included the Joan Crawford horror film Berserk! (1967), as one of the Oompa Loompas in Willy Wonka & the Chocolate Factory (1971), and as Hercules in I Don't Want to Be Born (1975). He was "World Cup Willie", the official mascot of the England Football Team in 1966.

== Death ==
Claydon died on 4 October 2001 at the age of 68, at Charing Cross Hospital.

== Filmography ==
| Year | Title | Role | Notes |
|---|---|---|---|
| 1967 | Casino Royale | Harrod's Security Man | Uncredited |
| 1967 | Magical Mystery Tour (film) | The photographer | |
| 1967 | Berserk! | Bruno Fontana | |
| 1971 | Willy Wonka & the Chocolate Factory | Oompa Loompa | Uncredited |
| 1971 | Twins of Evil | Midget | Uncredited |
| 1972 | Born to Boogie | The Dwarf, Eater of Cars | |
| 1975 | I Don't Want to Be Born | Hercules | |
| 1984 | The Last Days of Pompeii | Philos | Miniseries |
| 1989 | Prince Caspian | Nikabrik | TV movie |
