= The Lion, the Witch and the Wardrobe (1967 TV serial) =

British adaptation of children's fantasy novel

- Written by: C. S. Lewis; Trevor Preston
- Directed by: Helen Standage
- Starring: Zuleika Robson; Liz Crowther; Jack Woolgar
- Country of origin: United Kingdom
- No. of series: 1
- No. of episodes: 10 (8 missing)

Production
- Producer: Pamela Lonsdale
- Running time: 20 minutes (inc. adverts)
- Production company: ABC Weekend TV

Original release
- Network: ITV
- Release: 9 July – 10 September 1967

The Lion The Witch & The Wardrobe is a ten-part serial adaptation of C. S. Lewis's 1950 fantasy novel The Lion, the Witch and the Wardrobe, which aired on ITV in 1967.

== Background ==
The series was produced by Pamela Lonsdale and adapted for television by Trevor Preston. Original music was provided by Paul Lewis and the programme, and the costumes, were designed by Neville Green. The programme was made for the ITV network by ABC Weekend TV. The animals were all portrayed by actors in costume, not unlike the later BBC adaptation.

Only two episodes, the first and eighth, are known to still survive today. An audio recording of episode 7 also survives.

== Main cast ==
- Zuleika Robson - Susan
- Liz Crowther - Lucy
- Jack Woolgar - Professor
- Paul Waller - Peter
- Edward McMurray - Edmund
- Elizabeth Wallace - The White Witch
- George Claydon - Ginarrbrik
- Susan Field - Mrs. Beaver
- Jimmy Gardner - Mr. Beaver
- Bernard Kay - Aslan
- Robert Booth - Maugrim
- Angus Lennie - Mr. Tumnus
