= Elizabeth Wallace (actress) =

British actress

- Died: January 2011
- Occupation: Actress
- Known for: The Lion, the Witch and the Wardrobe (1967)

Elizabeth Wallace (died January 2011) was a British actress.

In 1967 she played the White Witch in The Lion, the Witch and the Wardrobe, a TV series adaptation of the 1950 children's novel.

Wallace started acting in the early 1950s. Her last piece of acting was in 1983 in an episode of Number 10, in which she played Lady Jersey.

Elizabeth Wallace was godmother to Wendy Craig's son. She died in January 2011.

== Filmography ==
- Douglas Fairbanks Jr., Presents as Yelitsa (1 episode, 1953)
- BBC Sunday Night Theatre as Annie Worgan (1 episode, 1959)
- The Vise' as Alice (1 episode, 1960)
- The Four Just Men as Maria (1 episode, 1960)
- International Detective as Donna Alicia (1 episode, 1960)
- Studio 4 (1 episode, 1962)
- Compact (1962) TV series as Diana Fielding
- Detective as Ann Walsing (1 episode, 1964)
- The Plane Makers as Harriet Evans (7 episodes, 1964–1965)
- The Man in Room 17 as Laura Bedford (1 episode, 1965)
- Theatre 625 as Jill Lincoln (2 episodes, 1964–1966)
- Dr. Finlay's Casebook as Lizzy Fairbanks (3 episodes, 1964–1966)
- The Troubleshooters as Myra Johnson (1 episode, 1966)
- The Man Who Never Was (1 episode, 1966)
- The Lion, the Witch and the Wardrobe as the White Witch (7 episodes, 1967)
- Villette (5 episodes, 1970)
- Tom Brown's Schooldays as Mrs. Flashman (1 episode, 1971)
- Number 10 as Lady Jersey (1 episode, 1983)
