= Shift (Narnia) =

- Narnia character

In-universe information
- Race: Talking Ape
- Nationality: Narnia

Shift is a fictional character in the children's fantasy series The Chronicles of Narnia by C. S. Lewis. He is the main antagonist of The Last Battle, which is the last book of the series. Shift is an ape who, like many animals in Lewis' work, can talk; Lewis does not specify what kind of ape, but Pauline Baynes' illustrations depict him as a chimpanzee. At the beginning of the book, he lives near his friend/servant Puzzle the donkey at the base of the Great Waterfall, next to the Caldron Pool where the Great River starts its course to the sea. Lewis describes Shift as "the cleverest, ugliest, most wrinkled Ape you can imagine."

== Name ==
The name Shift can be viewed as a description of the character in the same manner as other characters in The Last Battle such as Jewel and Puzzle. In the case of Shift, his name picks up on the two themes of deception (shiftiness) and development (change/shift).

== Biographical summary ==
=== Prior story ===
Nothing is known of Shift's history before he appears in chapter 1 of The Last Battle. There Lewis says that he is so old that no one remembers when he came to live at the base of the great waterfall. After his demise it is suggested that he may have been a spy of the Tisroc for years before the lion skin arrives in chapter one and he had only been waiting for an opportunity to betray Narnia.

=== Character development ===
Throughout the book, Shift's greed and lust for power serve as his primary motivations. Shift's actions to satisfy his greed increase in vileness as the story progresses. From lying to his "friend" Puzzle, he moves to manipulating the other talking animals of Narnia by ways of outlandish lies and unruly decrees that largely benefit himself and the Calormene population. In the end he has no problem murdering them and selling them into slavery to increase his own wealth and power. As Shift's actions become increasingly evil, he also becomes increasingly human in his appearance and in the way he presents himself. He dons human clothing and claims that he is not an ape, and that if he appears as one, it is only because he is "so very old: hundreds and hundreds of years old." However, at this stage he takes to drink and becomes increasingly the spokesman of the Calormene captain Rishda Tarkaan, and the cunning cat Ginger.

Shift gains the power to pursue these actions by tricking Puzzle into impersonating Aslan, the true leader of Narnia. Later, to secure the assistance of the neighboring country Calormen, he insists that their god Tash and Aslan are one and the same. But Shift's plans unravel when his actions unwittingly summon the real Tash into Narnia. Shift meets his end when he is thrown by King Tirian into the stable where Tash dwells to prove that Tash is in fact there, and is eaten by the monstrous god.

== Allegorical interpretations and literary references ==
Lewis, himself an expert on allegory, did not consider The Chronicles of Narnia allegory. He saw them as "suppositional" answering the question, "What might Christ become like, if there really were a world like Narnia and He chose to be incarnate and die and rise again in that world as He actually has done in ours?' This is not allegory at all." As such, Narnia presents significant parallels with elements from Christianity.

Shift is most often compared to the Antichrist from the biblical book of Book of Revelation.

Revelation 13:15 can be seen as a passable description of Shift's hold over the Narnians: "And he had power to give life unto the image of the beast, that the image of the beast should both speak, and cause that as many as would not worship the image of the beast should be killed." Shift's ability to present his false Aslan is what compels the Narnians to obey him, and the Calormenes kill those who resist.

A. N. Wilson and John Goldthwaite both suggest that Shift is intended as a type of the Catholic Church, in keeping with the traditional Protestant identification of the Pope with Antichrist. This identification is based on Shift's claim that Aslan cannot be bothered with speaking to a lot of animals and that he, Shift, is hereafter Aslan's sole mouthpiece. Similarly John J. Miller, writing for National Review, says: "I find it hard to see the ape Shift in The Last Battle, for example, as anything other than a satire of Roman Catholicism in general and the papacy in particular."

However, in Lewis' other writings it is made clear that he had no special animus against Roman Catholicism but detested theocracy in whatever form it might take. In his Oxford History of English Literature in the Sixteenth Century he endorses Milton's view that Elizabethan Presbyterianism was just as guilty as Roman Catholicism of interposing a priestly mediator between man and God: for example, in their belief that the Bible should never be read out in churches but only "opened through preaching". The ape's claim that Aslan (God) is not bound by human standards of good and evil is also a Puritan rather than a Catholic trait.
