= Prince Caspian =

1951 children's novel by C. S. Lewis

- First edition dustjacket
- Author: C. S. Lewis
- Illustrator: Pauline Baynes
- Cover artist: Pauline Baynes
- Language: English
- Series: The Chronicles of Narnia
- Release number: 2
- Genre: Children's fantasy novel, Christian literature
- Publisher: Geoffrey Bles
- Publication date: 15 October 1951
- Publication place: United Kingdom
- Media type: Print (hardcover)
- Pages: 195 pp (first edition); 44,740 words (US)
- ISBN: 978-0-00-671679-2 (Collins, 1998; full colour)
- OCLC: 2812448
- LC Class: PZ8.L48 Pr
- Preceded by: The Lion, the Witch and the Wardrobe
- Followed by: The Voyage of the Dawn Treader
- Text: Prince Caspian online

Prince Caspian (originally published as Prince Caspian: The Return to Narnia) is a high fantasy novel written by British author C. S. Lewis and published by Geoffrey Bles in 1951. It was the second published of seven novels in The Chronicles of Narnia (1950–1956), and Lewis had finished writing it in 1949, before the first book was out. It is volume four in recent editions of the series, sequenced according to the internal chronology of the books. Like the others, it was illustrated by Pauline Baynes and her work has been retained in many later editions.

Prince Caspian features a "return to Narnia" by the four Pevensie children of the first novel, about a year later in England but 1300 years later in Narnia. (Note: A manuscript by Lewis, the "Outline of Narnian History", dates major events in the Narnia world and simultaneous events in England. Since his death, it has been published in books about Narnia and is generally considered valid.) It is the only book of The Chronicles with men dominating Narnia. The talking animals and mythical beings are oppressed, and some may be endangered. The English siblings, legendary Kings and Queens of Narnia, are magically recalled, once again children, by the refugee Prince Caspian.

Macmillan US published an American edition within the calendar year.

Prince Caspian has been adapted and filmed as two episodes of BBC television series in 1989 and as a feature film in 2008.

== Plot summary ==
Peter, Susan, Edmund and Lucy Pevensie are magically whisked away from a British railway station to a beach near an old and ruined castle. They determine the ruin is Cair Paravel, where they once ruled as the kings and queens of Narnia. They discover the treasure vault where Peter's sword and shield, Susan's bow and arrows, and Lucy's dagger and bottle of magical cordial are stored. Susan's horn for summoning help is missing, as she left it in the woods the day they returned to England after their prior visit to Narnia. Although only a year has passed in England, 1300 years have passed in Narnia.

The children rescue Trumpkin the dwarf from soldiers who are about to drown him. Trumpkin tells the children Narnia's history since their disappearance: Telmarines conquered Narnia, which is now ruled by King Miraz and his wife, Queen Prunaprismia. Miraz usurped the throne by killing his brother, King Caspian IX, the father of Prince Caspian. Miraz tolerated the rightful heir, Prince Caspian, until his own son was born. Caspian escaped from Miraz's castle with the aid of his tutor Doctor Cornelius, who schooled him in the lore of Old Narnia, and gave him Queen Susan's horn. Caspian fled into the forest but was knocked unconscious when his horse bolted. He awoke in the den of a talking badger, Trufflehunter, and two dwarfs, Nikabrik and Trumpkin, who accepted Caspian as their king.

The badger and dwarves took Caspian to meet many creatures of Old Narnia. During a midnight council, Doctor Cornelius arrived to warn them of the approach of King Miraz and his army; he urged them to flee to Aslan's How in the great woods near Cair Paravel. The Telmarines followed the Narnians to the How, and after several skirmishes the Narnians appeared close to defeat. At a second war council, they decided to wind Queen Susan's horn in the hopes that it would bring help.

Trumpkin and the Pevensies make their way to Caspian. The trek proves difficult, but Aslan appears to Lucy and instructs her to guide the others behind him. Aslan sends Peter, Edmund, and Trumpkin ahead to deal with treachery brewing there, and follows with Susan and Lucy.

Peter, Edmund, and Trumpkin arrive and drive out or kill the creatures threatening Caspian. Peter challenges Miraz to single combat: the army of the victor in this duel would be considered the victor in the war. Miraz accepts the challenge, goaded by lords Glozelle and Sopespian. Miraz loses the combat, but Glozelle and Sopespian declare that the Narnians have cheated. The lords command the Telmarine army to attack, and in the commotion that follows, Glozelle stabs Miraz in the back. Aslan, accompanied by Susan and Lucy, summons the gods Bacchus and Silenus, and with their help brings the woods to life. The gods and awakened trees turn the tide of battle and send the Telmarines fleeing. Discovering themselves trapped at the Great River, where their bridge has been destroyed by Bacchus, the Telmarines surrender.

Aslan gives the Telmarines a choice of staying in Narnia under Caspian or returning to Earth, their original home. After one volunteer disappears through the magic door created by Aslan, the Pevensies go through to reassure the other Telmarines, though Peter and Susan reveal to Edmund and Lucy that they are too old to return to Narnia. The Pevensies find themselves back at the railway station.

== Characters ==
- Lucy Pevensie, the youngest Pevensie child and the first to see Aslan again.
- Edmund Pevensie, the third Pevensie child. Unlike his older siblings, he trusts Lucy's sighting of Aslan, pointing out that in their first adventure she turned out to be right and he ended up looking silly.
- Peter Pevensie, the oldest of the Pevensie siblings and High King of Narnia.
- Susan Pevensie, the second oldest of the Pevensie children. She uses a bow and arrow.
- Prince Caspian, the rightful Telmarine King, who becomes King of Narnia. He reappears in the next two books in the series: The Voyage of the Dawn Treader and The Silver Chair, and makes a brief appearance in the end of The Last Battle.
- Aslan, the Great Lion, who created Narnia.
- Miraz, Caspian's uncle, who usurped the throne of the Telmarines. So long as Miraz has no son, he tolerates Caspian as heir, but when a son is born he moves to eliminate Caspian. He fights the Old Narnians, who support Caspian, and accepts a challenge to single combat with Peter to settle the matter; but he is killed treacherously by Lord Glozelle after the duel.
- Trumpkin, a Red Dwarf who helps Caspian defeat Miraz. When he is captured by Miraz's soldiers and taken to Cair Paravel to be drowned, he is freed by the Pevensie children and leads them to Caspian. At the beginning of the novel he is entirely sceptical about the existence of Aslan and the ancient Kings and Queens, but learns better in the course of the story.
- Doctor Cornelius, half-dwarf and half-human, is tutor to Caspian and aids in the Narnians' defeat of the Telmarines.
- Reepicheep, a Talking Mouse (descended from the non-talking mice who freed Aslan from his bonds in the previous book, and were thus given the gift of speech), is a fearless swordsman and a staunch supporter of Aslan and Caspian.
- Nikabrik, a Black Dwarf in Caspian's army, who fights alongside Caspian. Together with a Hag and a Wer-Wolf, he plots to resurrect the White Witch against the Telmarines through black magic, but all three are killed by Caspian and his allies.
- Trufflehunter, a Talking Badger, who holds faith with Aslan and Old Narnia, and aids Prince Caspian in his struggle against Miraz.
- Wimbleweather, a giant who is allied with Prince Caspian
- Bacchus and Silenus, Narnian forest gods (borrowed from Ancient Greece).
- Lord Sopespian and Lord Glozelle, lords of Telmar. After being insulted by Miraz they manipulate him into accepting Peter's challenge. They cry treachery when Miraz falls, and Glozelle secretly stabs him in the back. Sopespian is beheaded by Peter as the all-out battle begins, but Lewis does not mention the fate of Glozelle.

== Themes ==
The two major themes of the story are courage and chivalry and, as Lewis himself said in a letter to an American girl, "the restoration of the true religion after a corruption".

The Telmarine conquest of Narnia, as depicted in the book, is in many ways similar to the historical Norman Conquest of England. Though there is no precise parallel in actual English history to the specific events of this book, the end result – "Old Narnians" and Telmarines becoming a single people and living together in harmony – is similar to the historical process of Saxons and Normans eventually fusing into a single English people.

== Adaptations ==
The BBC adapted Prince Caspian in two episodes of the 1989 series of The Chronicles of Narnia.

The second in the series of films from Walt Disney Pictures and Walden Media, titled The Chronicles of Narnia: Prince Caspian, was released in the US on 16 May 2008. The UK release date was 26 June 2008.

The book was the inspiration for a song of the same name on the Phish album Billy Breathes.

The script for a stage adaptation was written by Erina Caradus and first performed in 2007.

== Sources ==
- Downing, David C. (2005). Into the Wardrobe: C. S. Lewis and the Narnia Chronicles. San Francisco: Jossey-Bass. ISBN 978-0-7879-7890-7.
