= Edmund Pevensie =

Fictional character in the Narnia universe

- Narnia character
- Skandar Keynes as Edmund Pevensie in the 2008 film, The Chronicles of Narnia: Prince Caspian.
- First appearance: The Lion, the Witch and the Wardrobe (1950)
- Last appearance: The Last Battle (1956)
- Created by: C. S. Lewis

In-universe information
- Race: Human
- Titles: King Edmund the Just; Duke of Lantern Waste; Count of the Western March; Knight of the Noble Order of the Table
- Family: Mr & Mrs Pevensie (parents); Peter, Susan and Lucy Pevensie (siblings)
- Relatives: Eustace Scrubb (cousin)
- Nationality: English

Edmund Pevensie is a fictional character in C. S. Lewis's The Chronicles of Narnia series. He is a principal character in three of the seven books (The Lion, the Witch and the Wardrobe, Prince Caspian and The Voyage of the Dawn Treader), and a lesser character in two others (The Horse and His Boy and The Last Battle).

In The Lion, the Witch and the Wardrobe, Edmund betrays his siblings to the White Witch while under her influence, but as the story goes on, he accepts the error of his ways. He is redeemed with the intervention of Aslan and joins the fight against the witch. Fulfilling an ancient prophecy, he becomes King Edmund the Just, King of Narnia, and with sisters Susan and Lucy, co-ruler under High King Peter.

== Biography ==
=== Characteristics ===
Edmund is a selfish, spiteful and mean-spirited boy at the beginning of The Lion, the Witch and the Wardrobe. By the end of the book, and throughout the rest of the series, Edmund is seen to be loyal, courageous, logical, and mature. In his adult life, as a king of Narnia, it is revealed that he handles many of Narnia's negotiations and transactions, as seen in The Horse and His Boy when Shasta runs into Edmund in Tashbaan the capital city of Calormen, where he has accompanied Susan to discuss a marriage proposal from Prince Rabadash. Edmund becomes protective particularly of Lucy, and acts as a voice of reason to Peter, who is more apt to become carried away.

On his return to Narnia in Prince Caspian, he makes friendships with both Prince Caspian and Reepicheep, which develop further in the Voyage of the Dawn Treader.

Edmund acts as confidante and confessor to his cousin Eustace in the novel The Voyage of the Dawn Treader.

Aslan proclaims him King Edmund the Just, but in the letter sent to Miraz in the novel Prince Caspian he styles himself "Duke of Lantern Waste and Count of the Western March, Knight of the Noble Order of the Table".

=== The Lion, the Witch and the Wardrobe ===
In The Lion, the Witch and the Wardrobe, Edmund is one of the main characters, and the character who develops the most over the course of story.

It is implied in the book that Edmund started life as a likeable person, but then changed for the worse and became spiteful after starting at a new school.

Edmund makes unjust and hurtful comments to Lucy when she first finds the entrance to Narnia through the wardrobe, and is the second of the Pevensie children to go to Narnia, after following Lucy to mock her during a game of hide and seek.

He walks some distance into the forest, convinced that he will find Lucy, but instead he meets the White Witch (who introduces herself as the Queen of Narnia) and eats some enchanted Turkish delight, and receives promises from the "Queen" that she will make him a prince and that he will eventually reign Narnia as king. As a result, he promises the Witch that he will bring his siblings to her castle, not knowing that she intends to kill them all to prevent the fulfillment of a Narnian prophecy. He then realises from Lucy’s description during conversation that he has in fact made friends with a dangerous witch, but keeps his meeting with the Witch secret and remains determined to taste more Turkish Delight, as well as remembering the Witch's "pledges" to make him a prince.

Upon returning, he denies having been in Narnia, not wishing to admit that Lucy's story is true. When they all enter Narnia, the children are taken under protection of Mr and Mrs Beaver, but while the others are having an in-depth conversation about the arrival of Aslan, Edmund sneaks away to the White Witch's castle, where he expects to be made a prince and later a king.

However, his opinion of the Witch changes when she reveals her true character in her castle. She harshly berates him for coming alone, only offers him hard bread and cold water for his efforts, and does not shelter him from the cold on her sledge. Hearing from him that Aslan has arrived in Narnia, she heads straight towards Aslan's camp at the Stone Table, having first ordered Maugrim to find and kill his siblings and the Beavers. Edmund realises the full extent of her evil and powers on their journey when she turns a group of creatures enjoying a feast provided by Father Christmas to stone.

The Witch prepares to put Edmund to death as a traitor, but a rescue party sent by Aslan arrives, frees him, and brings him to his siblings and the rest of Aslan's army. Edmund becomes fully reformed after a long conversation with Aslan.

The next day, the Witch arrives and reiterates her claim to Edmund's life. She and Aslan work out an agreement that Aslan will die in Edmund's place (though the other Narnians do not know this); but unknown to her, the magical nature of this contract allows Aslan to be brought back to life.

While Aslan and Edmund's sisters race to free the cursed prisoners in the Witch's castle, Edmund fights in Peter's army in battle, where he neutralises the White Witch's most dangerous advantage, her wand, and is gravely wounded. He is saved from death by the timely arrival of reinforcements led by Aslan, who kills the witch, and by Lucy, who gives Edmund a dose of a magic cordial which can quickly heal any injury.

In the final chapter, Edmund is crowned by Aslan as co-ruler of Narnia with his siblings. After fifteen years in Narnia, he and his siblings return to England, where they all become children again.

=== The Horse and His Boy ===
Queen Susan, King Edmund, Tumnus the Faun and a raven named Sallowpad are visitors in the country of Calormen, where Crown Prince Rabadash wants to force Susan to marry him. Mistaking Shasta for the missing prince Corin Thunderfist of Narnia's ally Archenland, Edmund scolds the young boy for running off and making everyone worry. The Narnians manage to escape, which leads Rabadash to convince his father the Tisroc that they should take Narnia by invading Archenland.

Shasta brings warning of Rabadash's invasion to Narnia, and meets Edmund once again. Edmund gently reminds Shasta that he should not eavesdrop, but is clear that all is well before they march to Anvard to stop Rabadash. Edmund, Shasta, and Corin's father, King Lune of Archenland, lead the fight against the Calormene army and defeat them. Shasta is then recognized as Prince Cor, the long-lost heir of Archenland.

Edmund's own redemption lends him perspective during the judgment of Rabadash; despite the fact that Rabadash has acted treacherously, Edmund argues against killing him, saying (in reference to himself): "Even a traitor may mend. I have known one who did."

=== Prince Caspian ===
Edmund and his siblings return to Narnia to help Caspian, rightful King of Narnia, against King Miraz the Usurper. He convinces Trumpkin the dwarf that they are the Kings and Queens from the legend by defeating him in a sparring practice. He later helps Peter and Trumpkin defend Caspian against Nikabrik, a hag, and a werewolf, which Edmund kills. Edmund is also there to witness Peter's duel against Miraz.

He has since become more caring and protective of Lucy, and is the first person to believe her when she sees Aslan, supporting her against the disbelief of Trumpkin and her other siblings. Edmund is shown in a more positive light in this book than in The Lion, The Witch and The Wardrobe. His demeanour is more cooperative and loyal, even under the guidance of Peter, who is unprepared for the new Narnia and its current status. He rarely stands up to Peter openly but often subtly takes charge.

In the film, Edmund proves to be much more mature than Peter or Caspian, but he stays out of their arguments. Edmund sneaks into Miraz's castle ahead of the army to signal that it is safe to enter, and later presents Peter's proposition for a duel to Miraz and goads him into accepting, thereby buying them time. Also in the film, he stops the White Witch from being brought back from the dead by forcing his sword into the ice wall through which she is trying to re-enter Narnia, smashing it.

=== The Voyage of the Dawn Treader ===
Edmund, Lucy and their cousin Eustace enter the world of Narnia through a magic painting, and end up in the ocean. They are rescued and brought on board the Dawn Treader, where they are reunited with King Caspian, who is on a quest to search for the missing Lords that his uncle had sent to explore other lands some years before. This is Edmund and Lucy's last adventure in the world of Narnia since Aslan told them they were getting too old to come back. By this point Edmund's character has matured a great deal which can be seen in the way he deals with his cousin Eustace and in the power struggle with Caspian. Edmund and Lucy are noticeably close in this instalment, as can be seen in the way they defend each other against Eustace. When Eustace changes his behaviour after being changed back from a dragon, Edmund mentions his own betrayal and says that Eustace was not as bad as he once was. While on Ramandu's Island, Edmund says to Ramandu's daughter that when he looks at her, he cannot help believing what she says, but the same might happen with a witch.

=== The Last Battle ===
After seeing a vision of King Tirian of Narnia pleading for their help in England, Peter and Edmund go to the Ketterleys' old home in London to dig up the magic rings that Professor Kirke buried in the yard as a boy in The Magician's Nephew to be used by Eustace and Jill to reach Narnia. They are waiting for the others at the train platform when the accident happens.

When King Tirian sees the Seven Friends of Narnia in his dream/vision, he thinks that, as with Peter, that Edmund "had already the face of a King and a warrior".

Edmund accompanies everyone, except Susan, into Aslan's country. Like his brother and younger sister, he is killed in the train crash and is transferred to Aslan's country, where they all live forever.

== Portrayals ==
- In the 1967 TV serial, he was played by Edward McMurry.
- Jonathan R. Scott played Edmund in the 1988 BBC production. As an adult he is played by Charles Ponting.
- In Disney's live-action films, Edmund is portrayed by Skandar Keynes while Mark Wells plays Edmund as an adult in the end of the first film.
- In the spoof Epic Movie, Edmund is played by Kal Penn, renamed Edward.
