= Emeth =

Fictional character, a good man who worships Tash in The Last Battle (Narnia, book 7)

- Narnia character

In-universe information
- Race: Calormen
- Nationality: Calormen

Emeth (Hebrew אמת : "truth," "firmness," or "veracity") is a Calormene character from C. S. Lewis's book The Last Battle from The Chronicles of Narnia series. He is a controversial character among some Christians who take the Chronicles to be allegories (as opposed to what Lewis intended), and thus have expressed disagreement with Lewis' apparent soteriology. Specifically, the salvation of Emeth is understood to be an implicit endorsement of the doctrinal idea of inclusivism.

== Story ==
Emeth is a young Calormene officer, second in command of a detachment of the Tisroc's soldiers under Rishda Tarkaan, who enter Narnia in the guise of merchants. This is part of a conspiracy to seize the north of the country by using the Narnians' faith in a false Aslan controlled by the ape Shift. While welcoming the chance to distinguish himself in battle, Emeth is troubled by the "lies and trickery" used to portray Aslan as the Narnian version of the Calormene deity Tash. When Shift and Rishda set up the notion that "Tashlan" is in a stable, Emeth insists on seeing Tash with his own eyes. Once inside, Emeth kills a Calormene soldier waiting to dispatch anyone sent into the stable and throws his body outside the door.

The salvation of Emeth then follows. When Emeth finds himself in Aslan's Country, he encounters Aslan himself and realizes that his life spent in service to Tash will result in his condemnation. Despite this, Aslan accepts him, making Emeth think that what he heard about "Tashlan" was actually true. Aslan, however, explains that Aslan and Tash are opposites: any virtuous act done in Tash's name is actually accepted by Aslan, since Tash can only accept acts of evil. Thus, Emeth's devotion to Tash, founded on noble motives, was actually received by Aslan.

== Implications in Christian theology ==
Aslan's words to Emeth, in which he ratifies the good deeds the latter did even under the name of Tash, are the subject of some controversy.

I take to me the services which thou hast done to Tash [the false god]... if any man swear by him and keep his oath for the oath's sake, it is by me that he has truly sworn, though he know it not, and it is I who reward him."

Aslan's comment can be understood as a development of Paul's thought in 1 Corinthians 12:3: "No one who is speaking by the Spirit of God says, 'Jesus be cursed,' and no one can say, 'Jesus is Lord,' except by the Holy Spirit."

The implication for Christian belief is that people who reflect a righteous heart are justified, regardless of unbelief or misbelief. This relates to a longstanding question in Christian soteriology: if only explicit faith in Christ saves a person, then the large numbers of people born and raised in other faiths, perhaps even without knowledge of Christianity, seem to have no hope of salvation. The reverse position, that they are saved regardless, represents a type of inclusivism.

Lewis himself contributed to the commentary on this question, for example in a letter from 1952:

I think that every prayer which is sincerely made even to a false god, or to a very imperfectly conceived true God, is accepted by the true God and that Christ saves many who do not think they know him. For He is (dimly) present in the good side of the inferior teachers they follow. In the parable of the Sheep and Goats those who are saved do not seem to know that they have served Christ.

Lewis argues that this view can be derived from the parable of the sheep and goats in Matthew 25:34-40, from Paul's speech to the Athenians in Acts 17:23: "What you now worship as something unknown, I am going to proclaim to you", and from 1 Timothy 4:10: "God, the Savior of all men, especially of those who believe" (all references NIV).

Lewis encountered at least one contradiction to this idea in Romans 10:14: "How, then, can they call on the one they have not believed in? And how can they believe in the one of whom they have not heard? And how can they hear without someone preaching to them?" (TNIV). This is consistent with Paul's doctrine that though God is already with the pagans, they still need to see him revealed. Lewis, however, replied with 1 Corinthians 1:12-13: "One of you says, 'I follow Paul'; another, 'I follow Apollos'; another, 'I follow Cephas'; still another, 'I follow Christ.' -- Is Christ divided?" (TNIV), which he interpreted as indicating the sameness of God regardless of his context.

In Psalm 145:18 (JPS 1999), The LORD is promised to be "near to all who call Him, to all who call Him with sincerity". The word translated as "sincerity" is in fact Emeth (אמת) in the original.

== The Golem ==
The Hebrew word אמת 'Emeth' also figures in Jewish mythology. In one version of the golem legend, the Kabbalist Elijah Ba'al Shem of Chelm crafts in clay a man's form, which he brings to life by writing word אמת on its forehead. When he sees that the golem grows and grows, he realizes that he has a potentially troublesome situation. He knows that if he can erase from the golem's forehead the first letter of 'Emeth', the Hebrew letter א 'aleph', the remaining letters would spell מת 'meth', meaning "death". The rabbi brings the golem's forehead within reach of his hand by commanding the golem to remove his boots. He wipes the letter off of the golem's forehead, but this causes the golem's clay to collapse upon the rabbi.
