= List of The Chronicles of Narnia characters =

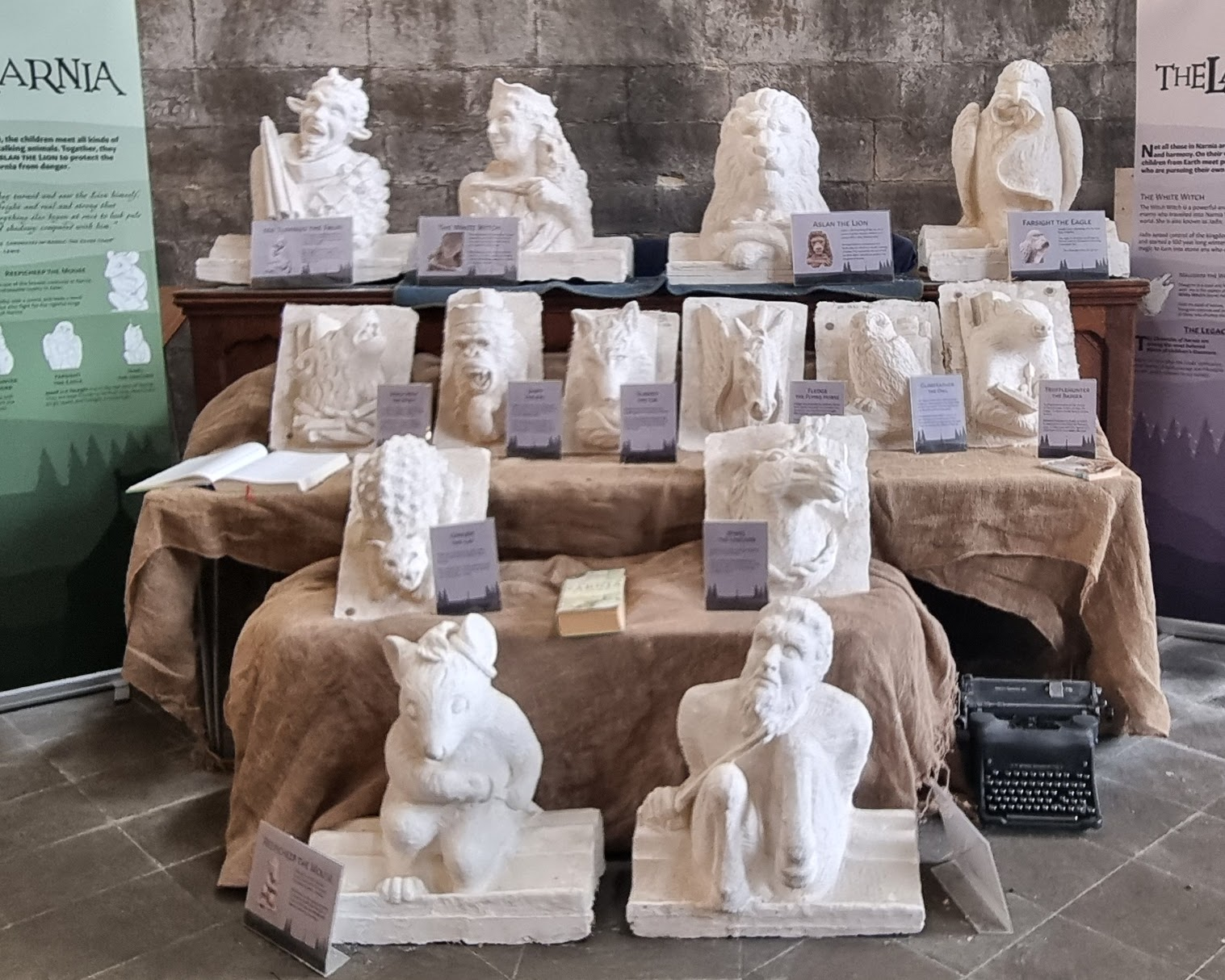
Some carvings of Narnia characters sculpted by Kibby Schaefer at St Mary's Church, Beverley

This is a list of characters in the series of fantasy novels by C. S. Lewis called The Chronicles of Narnia. See also a list of portrayals.

Narnia Abbreviation Key
Abbreviation	Expansion
LWW	The Lion, the Witch and the Wardrobe
PC	Prince Caspian
VDT	The Voyage of the Dawn Treader
SC	The Silver Chair
HHB	The Horse and His Boy
MN	The Magician's Nephew
LB	The Last Battle
TL	Narnian timeline

== A ==
- Ahoshta: a 60-year-old Tarkaan of Calormen who later becomes the Grand Vizier, chief adviser to the Tisroc (king). Aravis' stepmother arranged for her to marry him, but Aravis hated him because of his age, appearance, character, and base birth. (HHB)
- Alambil: "Lady of Peace", a planet (moving star) in the heavens above Narnia (PC)
- Alimash: Calormene nobleman, cousin of Aravis (HHB)
- Anradin Tarkaan: Calormene nobleman, former owner of Bree, who wants to buy Shasta (HHB)
- Aravis Tarkheena: the daughter of a Calormene nobleman; she flees when her stepmother attempts to marry her to Ahoshta. She escapes from Calormen with Shasta, and becomes Queen of Archenland after marrying him. (HHB)
- Ardeeb Tisroc: Great-great-great-great-grandfather of Aravis. (HHB)
- Argoz, Lord: One of the Seven Great Lords of Narnia. (VDT)
- Arlian, Lord: Killed by Miraz (PC)
- Arsheesh: a northern fisherman who lived in far south of the empire of Calormen. After finding a small boat with a dead man and a baby boy inside, Arsheesh kept the child and named him Shasta, but did not treat him in a fatherly manner (HHB)
- Aslan: The Great Lion, the Son of the Emperor-Beyond-the-Sea, the Lord of Cair Paravel, the Emperor of the Lone Islands, High King of All High Kings and the Creator and Lord of Narnia. (All)
- Axartha Tarkaan: Grand Vizier before Ahoshta Tarkaan (HHB)
- Azaroth: Calormene deity (HHB)
- Azrooh: Calormene, killed by King Lune (HHB)

== B ==
- Bacchus: Incarnate spirit of wine and ecstasy. Named for the Roman god of wine. (PC)
- Bannister, "Big": One of "the Gang" at Experiment House (SC)
- Bar, Lord: Former Lord Chancellor of Archenland, traitor who kidnaps Prince Cor (HHB)
- Beaver, Mr.: Builder of the dam near Beaversdam, he is the first Narnian to meet all four Pevensie children. He and his wife shelter the children and tell them of Narnia before leading them to Aslan (LWW)
- Beaver, Mrs.: She and Mr. Beaver provide shelter, food, and information for the four Pevensie children. When the White Witch sends an army of wolves after the children, Mr. and Mrs. Beaver escort the children to the Stone Table to meet Aslan. She makes good tea, but according to Mr Beaver is an indifferent cook. (LWW)
- Beech Dryad: A dryad who warns Tirian and his friends of the slaughter of the living trees before her tree is felled, resulting in her death (LB)
- Belisar, Lord: Killed by Miraz (PC)
- Bern, Lord: One of the Seven Great Lords of Narnia, Duke of Lone Islands (VDT)
- Betty: Servant to Professor Digory Kirke (LWW)
- Blakiston, Eleanor: Student at Experiment House (SC)
- Breehy-hinny-brinny-hoohy-hah (Bree for short): Horse, escaped captivity from Calormen and carries Shasta in his travels with Aravis (HHB)
- Bricklethumb: Red dwarf, brother of Duffle and Rogin (HHB)
- Bulgy Bears, the: Part of Caspian X's army of Old Narnians, in which one of the three becomes a general. They are very fond of supper, but are prone to suck their paws (PC)

== C ==
- Camillo: Talking hare who leads a group of animals to the Great Council (PC)
- Carter: Student at Experiment House (SC)
- Caspian the Conqueror (Caspian I): First Telmarine King of Narnia after the Telmarine invasion and founder of the Caspian dynasty. (PC)
- Caspian VI: Great-Great-Grandfather of Caspian X; builder of the Castle of Caspian (PC)
- Caspian VIII: Father of Caspian IX and Miraz (PC)
- Caspian IX: Father of Caspian X and brother of Miraz (PC)
- Caspian X (titled "The Seafarer" or "The Navigator"): born Prince Caspian, crowned King of Narnia with the help of Aslan and the Pevensie children. Afterwards, he voyages to the edge of the world in his ship, the Dawn Treader. Husband of Ramandu's daughter. Father of Prince Rilian. (PC, VDT, SC, LB)
- Chervy: Stag, warns of Calormene invasion (HHB)
- Chief Voice: "Leader" of the Dufflepuds (VDT)
- Chlamash: Calormene, surrenders to Edmund (HHB)
- Cholmondeley Major: Of "The Gang" at Experiment House (SC)
- Clipsie: Duffer, daughter of Chief Voice (VDT)
- Clodsley Shovel: Leader of the Moles (PC). The name is a pun on that of Admiral Sir Cloudesley Shovell.
- Cloudbirth: Centaur, famous healer (SC)
- Coalblack: Horse of Prince Rilian (SC)
- Col: First King of Archenland, son of Frank V (Timeline)
- Cole: Colin's elder brother, Archenland nobility (HHB)
- Colin: Cole's younger brother, Archenland nobility (HHB)
- Cor: see Shasta (HHB)
- Coriakin: Former star, sent as punishment to tend the Duffers (VDT)
- Corin: is the younger twin of Cor (Shasta), he is younger by 20 minutes. He is the son of King Lune and a famous boxer. His nickname is "Corin Thunderfist". He boxed the Lapsed Bear of Stormness, who was really a Talking bear but had returned to wild habits. (HHB)
- Cornelius: Half-dwarf, half-human, tutor to Caspian X; called a "half-and-halfer" by Nikabrik (PC)
- Corradin: Calormene, killed by Edmund (HHB)

== D ==
- Dar: Lord of Archenland, brother of Darrin (HHB)
- Darrin: Lord of Archenland, brother of Dar (HHB)
- Destrier: Horse of Prince Caspian. (The name is archaic English for "war-horse".) (PC)
- Diggle: Dwarf, leader of renegades (LB)
- D.L.F. (Dear Little Friend): Nickname for Trumpkin (PC)
- Drinian, Lord: Captain of the Dawn Treader, friend of Prince Rillian and his father King Caspian X (VDT), (SC)
- Duffle: Red Dwarf, brother of Rogin and Bricklethumb, assists Shasta (HHB)
- Dumnus: Faun, dances for Caspian X (PC)

== E ==
- Edward: Uncle Andrew's cousin, member of the yeomanry, frequents pawnshops. (MN)
- Emeth Tarkaan: Calormene Lord, befriends Narnians (LB)
- The Emperor-Over-the-Sea: a mysterious and powerful authority over Narnia. He is the father of Aslan, and the laws of Deep Magic and Deeper Magic are said to come from him. (LWW, VDT)
- Erimon, Lord: Killed by Miraz (PC)
- Erlian: Father of King Tirian and the sixth king of Narnia in the line of Rilian (LB)
- Emerald Witch: See Lady of the Green Kirtle (SC)

== F ==
- Farsight: Eagle, brings news to Tirian (LB)
- Father Christmas: Bringer of Christmas gifts for Peter, Susan, Lucy, and the Beavers (LWW)
- Father Time: Giant, awakens at the end of the world (SC), (LB)
- Featherstone, Anne: schoolmate of Lucy's. Anne is jealous of Lucy's friendship with Marjorie Preston. Lucy overhears (via magic), a conversation between Anne and Marjorie in which Anne scolds her for befriending Lucy. (VDT)
- Fenris Ulf: See Maugrim
- Fledge: formerly Strawberry, the father of all the winged horses; once a London cab-horse. (MN)
- Frank I: First King of Narnia, formerly a London cabby (MN)
- Frank V: King of Narnia, father of Col of Archenland (timeline)

== G ==
- Gale: Tenth King of Narnia (LB)
- "The Gang": A gang of bullies at Experiment House, who bully students including Eustace and Jill. The ones at the moment when Eustace and Jill leave and return to our world are:"Big" Bannister, Adela Pennyfather, Cholmondeley Major, Edith Winterblott, "Spotty" Sorner, and the "loathsome" Garrett twins. All of these are given thrashings by Eustace, Jill, and Caspian when they return from Narnia, and are ultimately expelled. (SC)
- Garrett Twins: Of "The Gang" at Experiment House (SC)
- Ginger: Cat, in league with Shift. As Shift becomes more and more a puppet of the Calormenes, Ginger gains more power as well, through being in league with the Calormenes against Shift and the other animals they are manipulating. (LB)
- Girbius: Faun, dances for Caspian X (PC)
- Glenstorm: Centaur, prophet and stargazer (PC)
- Glimfeather: Owl, carries Jill Pole and Eustace Scrubb to the Parliament of Owls (SC)
- Glozelle, Lord: Counselor to Miraz, killed in battle by High King Peter. (PC)
- Golg: Earthman, questioned by Puddleglum & Prince Rilian (SC)
- Griffle: Black Dwarf, disloyal to Tirian (LB)
- Gumpas: Governor of the Lone Islands, deposed by Caspian X. (VDT)
- Gwendolen: Narnian/Telmarine schoolgirl who follows Aslan. (PC)

== H ==
- Harpa Tarkaan: Father of Emeth (LB)
- Helen I: First queen of Narnia (MN)
- Hermit of the Southern March: Magician, took in Aravis, Bree, and Hwin. (HHB)
- Hogglestock: Representative of the hedgehogs (PC)
- Hwin: Talking mare from Narnia, but brought up in captivity in Calormen; carries Aravis in her travels with Shasta (HHB)

== I ==
- Ilgamuth: Calormene, killed by Darrin (HHB)
- Ilsombreh Tisroc: Great-great-grandfather of Aravis. (HHB)
- Ivy: Servant to Professor Kirke (LWW)

== J ==
- Jackdaw: Name never given. Member of a bird species related to the crows, first joke of Narnia (MN)
- Jackle, Edith: Hanger-on and talebearer for "the Gang" at Experiment House (SC)
- Jadis: See White Witch
- Jewel: A male unicorn, best friend of King Tirian, never deceived by the False Aslan (LB)

== K ==
- Ketterley, Andrew: A magician, Digory's "mad" Uncle Andrew, brother of Digory's mother Mabel. Andrew invented the rings that bring Digory and Polly to the Wood between the Worlds. Though initially portrayed as an egotistical, cowardly and selfish character, his own experiences teach him to mend his ways. (MN)
- Ketterley, Letitia: Digory's aunt Letty, sister to Andrew Ketterley and Mabel Kirke (MN)
- Kidrash Tarkaan: Father of Aravis (HHB)
- Kirke, Digory: Friend of Narnia, second to leave the Earth (MN), (LWW), (LB)
- Kirke, Mabel: Née Ketterley, mother of Digory, sister of Andrew and Letitia (MN)
- Kirke, Mr: (First name unknown) Digory's Father, "away" in India, conveniently inherits a fortune and comes home forever. (MN)

== L ==
- Lady of the Green Kirtle: Queen of the Underland, a powerful sorceress who kidnapped and enslaved Prince Rilian for several years and planned to use him in a plot to take over Narnia. (SC)
- Lapsed Bear of Stormness: Reformed by Corin (HHB)
- Lasaraleen Tarkheena: Calormene noblewoman, a friend of Aravis; despite being vain, gossipy, and featherbrained, she helps Aravis escape Tashbaan safely with Hwin and Bree. (HHB)
- Lefay, Mrs.: Andrew's fairy godmother, who bequeathed him the Atlantean dust with which he made the magic rings that transport Digory and Polly to the Wood between the Worlds. (MN)
- Lilith: Adam's supposed first wife; purported ancestor of Jadis. (LWW)
- Liln: Wife of Fair Olvin of Archenland (HHB)
- Lilygloves: Chief Mole, helps plant orchard (PC)
- Lune, King: King of Archenland, widower, father of Cor and Corin (HHB)

== M ==
- Macready, Mrs.: Housekeeper to Professor Kirke (LWW)
- Maenads: Bacchus' wild, madcap band of girls, from Greek mythology. (PC)
- Margaret: Servant to Professor Kirke (LWW)
- Maugrim: Talking Wolf, Captain of the White Witch's secret police during her 100-year wintry reign of Narnia. Killed by King Peter. He is called Fenris Ulf in some American editions of the books. (LWW)
- Mavramorn, Lord: One of the Seven Great Lords of Narnia, (VDT)
- Mentius: Faun, dances for Caspian X (PC)
- Miraz: Usurping king of Narnia, son of Caspian VIII, brother of Caspian IX and uncle of Caspian X (Prince Caspian) (PC)
- Moonwood: Hare, gifted with acute hearing (LB)
- Mullugutherum: Earthman (SC)

== N ==
- Nain, King: King of Archenland during reign of Miraz (PC)
- Nausus: Faun, dances for Caspian X (PC)
- Nikabrik: Black Dwarf who fights with Caspian X against Miraz, killed when he tries to bring the White Witch back to life with the aid of a hag and a wer-wolf. (PC)
- Nimienus: Faun, dances for Caspian X (PC)
- The Nurse: Caretaker of Caspian X, tells stories of Old Narnia (PC)

== O ==
- Oak: Hamadryad, member of Aslan's council (MN)
- Octesian, Lord: One of the Seven Great Lords of Narnia, died on Dragon Isle (VDT)
- Olvin: Called Fair Olvin; legendary warrior of Archenland, turned Pire to stone (HHB)
- Obentinus: Faun, dances for Caspian X (PC)
- Orruns: Faun (SC)
- Oscuns: Faun, dances for Caspian X (PC)

== P ==
- Passarids: Noble family of Narnia, killed fighting giants (PC)
- Pattertwig: Talkative, but trustworthy squirrel (PC)
- Peepiceek: Second Mouse under Reepicheep (PC)
- Pennyfather, Adela: Of "The Gang" at Experiment House, terrorized Jill and Eustace. (SC)
- Peridan, Lord: Narnian courtier at embassy to Tashbaan (HHB)
- Pevensie, Edmund: Friend of Narnia, King of Narnia, The Just (LWW), (HHB), (PC), (VDT), (LB)
- Pevensie, Lucy: Friend of Narnia, Queen of Narnia, The Valiant (LWW), (HHB), (PC), (VDT), (LB)
- Pevensie, Peter: Friend of Narnia, High King of Narnia, The Magnificent, Lord of Cair Paravel, Emperor of the Lone Islands (LWW), (PC), (LB)
- Pevensie, Susan: Friend of Narnia, Queen of Narnia, The Gentle (LWW), (HHB), (PC)
- Pire: a terrible two-headed giant who threatened Archenland. (HHB)
- Pittencream: Sailor who was left on Ramandu's Island (VDT)
- Plummer, Polly: Friend of Narnia, first to leave Earth (MN), (LB)
- Poggin: Dwarf, the last dwarf loyal to King Tirian (LB)
- Pole, Jill: Friend of Narnia, adventuress (SC), (LB)
- Pomona: Wood-People, put spells on apple orchard (PC); from the Roman goddess Pomona.
- Preston, Marjorie: Schoolmate of Lucy (VDT)
- Miss Prizzle: Schoolmistress in Narnia (PC)
- Professor Kirke: See Kirke, Digory
- Prunaprismia: Wife of Miraz (PC). The name refers to Charles Dickens' Little Dorrit, where a character recommends prunes and prism as words that will keep one's mouth pursed in a prim and proper pose.
- Puddleglum: Marshwiggle, acts as a guide to Eustace and Jill as they journey through Ettinsmoor in search of Prince Rilian. He is incredibly pessimistic, yet up to any challenge. (SC)
- Pug: Pirate and slaver on Felimath (VDT)
- Pulverulentus Siccus: Telmarine Narnian grammarian, author of the Grammatical Garden (PC); the name means "dusty dry" in Latin.

- Puzzle: A donkey tricked into becoming the false Aslan by Shift the ape. He eventually joins the protagonists and redeems himself to Aslan. (LB)

== R ==
- Rabadash: Crown Prince and later Tisroc of Calormen. Led failed Calormene invasion of Narnia. Called "Rabadash the Peacemaker" to his face, and "Rabadash the Ridiculous" behind his back. He is punished by Aslan after defying & insulting Him to his face (HHB)
- Ram the Great: the "most famous" King of Archenland, son of King Cor and Queen Aravis (HHB)
- Ramandu: Star, father-in-law of Caspian X (VDT)
- Ramandu's Daughter: The daughter of Ramandu, she is unnamed in the books. A producer of the BBC TV serial (and Lewis's stepson), Douglas Gresham, coined the name "Lilliandil". for her. She marries Caspian X, and is killed by a green serpent, later revealed as the Lady of the Green Kirtle. (VDT), (SC)
- Raven of Ravenscaur: Leader of the Ravens (PC)
- Reepicheep: Chief Mouse of Narnia, member of the Most Noble Order of the Lion, famed for his courage and skill with a rapier. He fights for Prince Caspian and later travels with him to the end of the world, where he continued onward towards Aslan's Country. (PC), (VDT), (LB)
- Restimar, Lord: One of the Seven Great Lords of Narnia, died on Deathwater (VDT)
- Revilian, Lord: One of the Seven Great Lords of Narnia, one of the three sleepers on Ramandu's island (VDT)
- Rhince: First mate of the Dawn Treader (VDT)
- Rhoop, Lord: One of the Seven Great Lords of Narnia, rescued from the Dark Island (VDT)
- Rilian: the only son of King Caspian X, who fell under the enchantment of the Green Witch for ten years. (SC)
- Rishda Tarkaan: Calormene commander in the Tisroc's army; plots with Shift to take over Narnia (LB)
- Rishti Tarkaan: Grandfather of Aravis (HHB)
- River-God: Of the Great River, Father and leader of the Naiads, unchained by Bacchus near Beruna (PC)
- Rogin: Red Dwarf, brother of Bricklethumb and Duffle (HHB)
- Roonwit: Centaur, reads stars, friend to Tirian (LB)
- Rumblebuffin, Giant: a 20 foot tall Narnian giant who was turned into stone by the White Witch, and was later freed by Aslan (LWW)
- Rynelf: Loyal sailor on the Dawn Treader (VDT)

== S ==
- Sallowpad: Raven, of Narnian embassy to Calormen. From sealwigpada "dark-coated" (Old English poetic term for a raven). (HHB).
- Sarah: Andrew's housemaid, good natured (MN)
- Scrubb, Alberta: Eustace's mother (VDT)
- Scrubb, Eustace Clarence: Friend of Narnia, cousin of the Pevensies, reformed pest (VDT, SC, LB)
- Scrubb, Harold: Father of Eustace (VDT)
- Shasta: a young boy brought up by Arsheesh, meets the talking horse Bree, who persuades him to escape Calormen by riding north for Narnia. Shasta discovers he is really Prince Cor of Archenland, and helps to save Narnia from invasion. He eventually becomes the King Cor of Archenland. (HHB)
- Shar: Archenlander (HHB)
- Shift: Ape, influenced the donkey Puzzle to impersonate Aslan and gain control over Narnia. The Calormenes were later able to take over Narnia because of this. Ultimately, Shift is devoured by Tash. (LB)
- Silenus: Fat old man, attendant of Bacchus, rides a donkey. He shouts, "Refreshments, refreshments!" (PC) From Greek mythology.
- Slinkey: Fox, traitor, killed by Eustace (LB)
- Snowflake: Horse of the Emerald Witch (SC)
- Sopespian, Lord: Telmarine, killed by Peter (PC)
- Sorner, "Spotty": One of "the Gang" at Experiment House (SC)
- Spivvins: Schoolmate of Eustace (SC)
- Stonefoot: Giant, summoned by Roonwit to Tirian (LB)
- Strawberry: See Fledge
- Swanwhite: Queen of Narnia. She was so beautiful that when she looked into a forest pool, her reflection shone for a year and a day afterward. (LB)

== T ==
- Tacks: Pug's fellow slave dealer on Felimath. (VDT)
- Tarva: "Lord of Victory", a planet (moving star) in the heavens above Narnia (PC)
- Tash: The inexorable god of the Calormenes, a skeletal figure with the head of a vulture and four arms, who demands blood sacrifices (HHB), (LB)
- Thornbut: Red Dwarf, placed in charge of Prince Corin at the time of the Calormene invasion of Archenland, and tries to prevent the prince from joining in the battle (HHB)
- Tirian: Last King of Narnia, seventh in descent from King Rilian. (LB)
- Tran: Member of Archenland nobility (HHB)
- Tisroc: The supreme ruler of Calormen (HHB)
- Trufflehunter: is a talking Badger, who cares for Caspian X when he is injured while fleeing from Miraz. He remains loyal to Aslan throughout. (PC)
- Trumpkin: Red Dwarf, seeks out Pevensies (PC), (VDT), (SC)
- Tumnus: Faun, befriends Lucy when she first arrives in Narnia and saves her from the White Witch. (LWW), (HHB), (LB)

== U ==
- Urnus: Faun, holds Trumpkin's ear trumpet (SC)
- Uvilas: Lord of Narnia, killed by Miraz, Uncle to Prince Caspian (PC)

== V ==
- Voltinus: Faun, dances for Caspian X (PC)
- Voluns: Faun, dances for Caspian X (PC)

== W ==
- Warden: Of the Marches of the Underland (SC)
- White Stag: Hunted by the Pevensies; rumoured to grant wishes if caught (LWW), (SC)
- White Witch: or Queen Jadis of Charn. Once ruler of the dead world of Charn, she subsequently enslaved Narnia in a 100-year winter (MN), (LWW)
- Wimbleweather: Of Deadman's Hill, a rather dim 10 foot tall giant (PC)
- Winterblott, Edith: Of "The Gang" at Experiment House (SC)
- Wraggle: Satyr, traitor, killed by Jill (LB)

== Z ==
- Zardeenah: Calormene goddess, "Lady of the Night". Unmarried Calormene women dedicate themselves to her and offer secret sacrifice to her. (HHB)

== Adaptations ==
Narnian characters that are not mentioned in Lewis' books but that appear in film or game adaptations of The Chronicles of Narnia include the following:

- Badger: Mr. Beaver's best friend, seen only when Mr. Beaver discovers that he has been turned to stone by the White Witch. (LWW film)
- Green Dryad: A dryad who lives in a Cherry Blossom tree. First seen waving to Lucy along with another dryad behind her. Next shown alerting Peter and Edmund of Aslan's death witnessed by Susan and Lucy. Voiced by Katrina Browne. (LWW film)
- Mr. Fox: Helps the Pevensies escape from the wolves in the movie. He was sent by Aslan to gather additional troops, during which he was captured by the White Witch's wolves. He is petrified by the White Witch, but restored by Aslan. Voiced by Rupert Everett. (LWW film)
- Gael: a Lone Islander whose mother was sacrificed to the green mist in the VDT film. She sneaks aboard the Dawn Treader to follow her father, Rhince, who joins the crew to look for his wife.
- Ginarrbrik: The White Witch's right-hand dwarf, who is given a name only in the movie. He is killed by Susan when he tries to kill a wounded Edmund during the battle. Played by Kiran Shah. (LWW film)
- Gryphons: creatures with the hind body of a lion and the front body of an eagle. They appear in none of the Narnia books but were created for the recent film. One of them, voiced by Cameron Rhodes, alerts Peter of the approach of the Witch's army. (LWW film)
- Oreius, General: Centaur, created for the movie. General of Aslan's army and fights alongside Peter. He successfully kills Otmin during the battle of Beruna, but is unsuccessful when he tries to kill the White Witch and is turned to a stone. Played by Patrick Kake. (LWW film)
- Lilliandil: The daughter of Ramandu. She is unnamed in the books, so a producer of the BBC TV serial (and Lewis's stepson), Douglas Gresham, coined the name "Lilliandil". She marries Caspian X, and is killed by a green serpent, later revealed as the Lady of the Green Kirtle. (VDT film and book), (SC)
- Otmin, General: Minotaur, created for movie. General of the White Witch's army. Killed by Oreius in the battle of Beruna. Played by Shane Rangi. (LWW film)
- Pevensie, Helen: Mother to Peter, Susan, Edmund, and Lucy. She does not appear in the books, but in the film assists her children into an air-raid shelter and waves good-bye at the train station. Named "Helen", after the mother of Georgie Henley, who plays Lucy and has a line referring to her mother's given name. Played by Judy McIntosh. (LWW film)
- Asterius: Minotaur who served Prince Caspian is killed by multiple Telmarine archers. (PC film)
- Tyrus: The Head Satyr in the Old Narnian Army, met his death at Miraz's Castle via crossbow and being shoved from the balcony by Miraz. (PC film)
- Diomedus: White Furred Minotaur and Member of the Old Narnian Army (PC film)
- Lightning Bolt: Child Centaur and one of the Old Narnians is Shown at Aslan's How (PC film)
- Tavros: a Minotaur who served as first mate aboard the Dawn Treader (VDT film)

== See also ==
- Magical creatures in The Chronicles of Narnia
- Adaptations of The Chronicles of Narnia
- List of The Chronicles of Narnia (film series) cast members
