= Susan Pevensie =

Fictional character in The Chronicles of Narnia

- Narnia character
- Anna Popplewell as Susan Pevensie in the 2005 film, The Chronicles of Narnia: The Lion, the Witch and the Wardrobe.
- First appearance: The Lion, the Witch and the Wardrobe (1950)
- Last appearance: The Horse and His Boy (1954)
- Created by: C. S. Lewis

In-universe information
- Race: Human
- Gender: Female
- Title(s): Queen Susan the Gentle; Queen Susan of the Horn
- Family: Mr & Mrs Pevensie (parents); Peter, Edmund and Lucy Pevensie (siblings); Eustace Scrubb (cousin), Alberta Scrubb (aunt) and Harold Scrubb (uncle)
- Nationality: English

Susan Pevensie is a fictional character in C. S. Lewis's The Chronicles of Narnia series. Susan is the elder sister and the second eldest of the 4 Pevensie children, which are Lucy, Edmund, herself, and Peter. She appears in three of the seven books – as a child in The Lion, the Witch and the Wardrobe and Prince Caspian, and as an adult in The Horse and His Boy. She is also mentioned in The Voyage of the Dawn Treader and The Last Battle. During her reign at the Narnian capital of Cair Paravel, she is known as Queen Susan the Gentle or Queen Susan of the Horn. She was the only Pevensie that survived the train crash (because she was not on the train or at the station) on Earth which sent the others to Narnia after The Last Battle.

== Fictional character biography ==
Susan was born in 1928 and is 12 years old when she appears in The Lion, the Witch and the Wardrobe. By The Last Battle, she is 21 years old, as the final novel takes place in 1949.

In The Lion, the Witch and the Wardrobe, Susan and her brother Peter only discover Narnia after their younger siblings have already been there. Father Christmas gives Susan a bow with arrows that never miss their target, and a magical horn that brings aid when blown. Susan is advised to stay out of the battle. After the battle, she is crowned as Queen of Narnia by Aslan, and becomes known as Queen Susan the Gentle.

In Prince Caspian, Susan and the other Pevensies are magically transferred to Narnia from a railway station in England. She is described as being gentle and tender-hearted and she immerses herself in their adventures as deeply as in the first book.

In The Voyage of the Dawn Treader, Susan accompanies her parents on a trip to America, while Peter is being tutored by Professor Digory Kirke.

In The Horse and His Boy, set during the Pevensie siblings' reign in Narnia, Susan is asked, and almost forced, to make a diplomatic marriage to the Calormene Prince Rabadash. Though much of the plot revolves around her rescue from this situation and Rabadash's militant response, she herself appears in only one scene.

In The Last Battle, Susan is conspicuous by her absence. Peter says that she is "no longer a friend of Narnia", and (in Jill Pole's words) "she's interested in nothing now-a-days except nylons and lipstick and invitations". Thus, Susan does not enter the real Narnia with the others at the end of the series. It is left ambiguous whether Susan's absence is permanent.

== Character development ==
In his Companion to Narnia, Paul F. Ford writes at the end of the entry for Susan Pevensie that "Susan's is one of the most important Unfinished Tales of The Chronicles of Narnia."

Lewis himself stated that:

The books don't tell us what happened to Susan. She is left alive in this world at the end, having by then turned into a rather silly, conceited young woman. But there's plenty of time for her to mend and perhaps she will get to Aslan's country in the end... in her own way.

Lewis further elaborated on Susan's fate in a 19 February 1960 letter to Pauline Bannister, who wrote to Lewis, upset that Susan was excluded from her brothers and sister from Aslan's country. He stated:

I could not write that story myself. Not that I have no hope of Susan’s ever getting to Aslan’s country; but because I have a feeling that the story of her journey would be longer and more like a grown-up novel than I wanted to write. But I may be mistaken. Why not try it yourself?

== Criticism ==
Fantasy author Neil Gaiman's 2004 short story "The Problem of Susan" depicts its protagonist, Professor Hastings (who strongly resembles an adult version of Susan), dealing with the grief and trauma of her entire family's death in a train crash, as she is interviewed by a college literature student regarding her opinion on Susan's place in the Narnia books. Since the publication of Gaiman's story, "the problem of Susan" has become used more widely as a catchphrase for the literary and feminist investigation into Susan's treatment.

Authors J. K. Rowling and Philip Pullman, both of whom were influenced by Lewis, have also commented on the issue:

There comes a point where Susan, who was the older girl, is lost to Narnia because she becomes interested in lipstick. She's become irreligious basically because she found sex. I have a big problem with that.

— J. K. Rowling

I just don't like the conclusions Lewis comes to, after all that analysis, the way he shuts children out from heaven, or whatever it is, on the grounds that the one girl is interested in boys. She's a teenager! Ah, it's terrible: "Sex – can't have that."

— Philip Pullman

== Portrayals ==
- In the six-part 1960 BBC Home Service adaptation of The Lion, the Witch and the Wardrobe, Susan is played by Carol Marsh.
- In the 1967 ITV serial, Susan was played by Zuleika Robson.
- In the 1988–1997 BBC Radio 4 adaptations of the Narnia books, Abigail Docherty played Susan in The Lion, the Witch and the Wardrobe, Susie Hay played her in Prince Caspian and Deborah Berlin played the adult Queen Susan in The Horse and his Boy.
- In the 1979 Warner Bros. TV movie adaptation, she is voiced by Susan Sokol.
- In the 1988 BBC production, Susan is portrayed by Sophie Cook.
- In Disney's live-action films, Susan is portrayed by Anna Popplewell as a child and Sophie Winkleman as an adult in the end of the first film.
- In the 2005 audio dramatization, Focus on the Family Radio Theatre cast David Suchet's daughter Katherine as the young Susan, while Sally Ann Burnett played her as an adult.
