= The Horse and His Boy =

1954 children's novel by C. S. Lewis

- First edition dustjacket
- Author: C. S. Lewis
- Illustrator: Pauline Baynes
- Cover artist: Pauline Baynes
- Language: English
- Series: The Chronicles of Narnia
- Release number: 5
- Genre: Children's fantasy novel, Christian literature
- Publisher: Geoffrey Bles
- Publication date: 6 September 1954
- Publication place: United Kingdom
- Media type: Print (hardcover)
- Pages: 199 pp (first edition); 48,029 words (US)
- OCLC: 2801054
- LC Class: PZ7.L58474 Ho
- Preceded by: The Silver Chair
- Followed by: The Magician's Nephew
- Text: The Horse and His Boy online

The Horse and His Boy is a high fantasy novel written by British author C. S. Lewis and published by Geoffrey Bles in 1954, as the fifth of the seven novels of the The Chronicles of Narnia (1950–1956). The novel is set in the period covered by the last chapter of The Lion, the Witch and the Wardrobe during the reign of the four Pevensie children as Kings and Queens of Narnia. Though three of the Pevensies appear as minor characters in The Horse and His Boy, the main characters are two children and two talking horses who escape from Calormen and travel north into Narnia. On their journey, they learn of the Prince of Calormen's plan to attack Archenland, and warn the King of Archenland of the impending strike.

Like the other novels in The Chronicles of Narnia, The Horse and His Boy was illustrated by Pauline Baynes; her work has been retained in many later editions. The book is dedicated to David and Douglas Gresham, who became Lewis's stepsons when he married their mother Joy Davidman in 1956.

== Plot summary ==
Shasta is a boy who lives in southern Calormen with Arsheesh, an abusive fisherman whom Shasta believes to be his father. A powerful nobleman demands hospitality one evening, and haggles with Arsheesh to buy Shasta as his slave. It emerges that Arsheesh is not Shasta's father, having found him in a washed-up boat as a baby. In the stable, Bree, the nobleman's stallion, astounds the boy by speaking. He tells Shasta that the nobleman is very cruel to his slaves, and suggests they both flee to his homeland of Narnia, from where he was captured as a foal. Shasta agrees, and they sneak away at night.

After weeks of northwards travel, during which the two companions bond, a brief chase to escape lions leads to their meeting another pair of refugees: another Narnian Talking Horse, the mare Hwin, who shares Bree's desire to return home, and Aravis, a young noblewoman who wants to escape a political marriage to Ahoshta, the elderly and ugly Grand Vizier. Although Shasta and Aravis immediately dislike each other, the four decide to travel together. In Tashbaan, the capital of Calormen, a party of Narnians mistake Shasta for Corin, the prince of Archenland, a Narnian ally, who has gone missing. Taken from the others, Shasta overhears the Narnians planning to escape Calormen to prevent a forced marriage between Queen Susan and Rabadash, son of the Tisroc, the Calormen ruler. Shasta escapes when Corin returns, but not before learning of a hidden route through the desert.

Meanwhile, Aravis is spotted by her friend Lasaraleen, who helps Aravis escape through the Tisroc's garden, although she cannot understand Aravis' motives. On the way, they overhear the Tisroc discussing the Narnians' escape with Rabadash and Ahoshta. The Tisroc gives Rabadash permission to raid Archenland and Narnia to kidnap Queen Susan while High King Peter is away battling giants in the north, but notes that he cannot openly support such a raid and will renounce Rabadash if he fails. The four fugitives reunite at a necropolis where Shasta has had supernatural dreams. Pooling their information, they set out across the desert along the hidden route to warn Archenland; they are again chased by a lion, which injures Aravis.

A hermit tends to Aravis' wounds, while Shasta carries on, on foot. He finds Lune, King of Archenland, and warns him of the raiders. He is separated from Lune in thick fog and encounters an unseen presence, who claims to have been not only the lion who injured Aravis, but also the lion who caused the four to join forces, and even the one who guided Shasta's boat to Arsheesh. The presence disappears, and Shasta finds himself in Narnia. He again meets Corin, who is travelling southwards with the Narnian party (who escaped from Calormen successfully) to assist Archenland. The Narnians, led by King Edmund and Queen Lucy, arrive at the Archenland capital of Anvard, and defeat the Calormenes, who were unable to take the castle because of Shasta's warning. Rabadash is captured and most of his men are killed, including Bree's old master. In the aftermath, Aslan appears and turns Rabadash into a donkey after he refuses to accept defeat. His human form is restored when he returns to Tashbaan, but thereafter he is forbidden to travel more than ten miles from the city, on pain of permanent transformation. His reign as Tisroc is therefore very peaceful despite earning the nickname "Rabadash the Ridiculous".

Lune realizes that Shasta is his son Cor, the long-lost identical twin of Prince Corin and the heir to the Archenland throne. Cor had been kidnapped as a baby in an attempt to thwart a prophecy which foretold that he would save Archenland from its greatest peril. He was lost at sea in the ensuing battle to rescue him, but Aslan made sure that the baby found his way to Arsheesh. Shasta's warning fulfilled the prophecy. Corin is delighted that Shasta is heir, as he did not want to be king. Aravis and Cor eventually marry and rule Archenland after Lune's death. Their son, Ram, becomes the most famous king of Archenland. Bree and Hwin found love separately after returning to Narnia and all four would reunite regularly.

== Themes and motifs ==
=== Divine providence ===
After meeting King Lune of Archenland and warning him of the impending Calormene invasion, Shasta becomes lost in a fog and separated from the Archenlanders. While walking in the fog, he senses a mysterious presence nearby. Engaging in conversation with the unknown being, Shasta tells of his misfortunes, including twice being chased by lions. His companion, who turns out to be Aslan, responds as follows:

"I was the lion who forced you to join with Aravis. I was the cat who comforted you among the houses of the dead. I was the lion who drove the jackals from you while you slept. I was the lion who gave the horses the new strength of fear for the last mile so that you should reach King Lune in time. And I was the lion you do not remember who pushed the boat in which you lay, a child near death, so that it came to shore where a man sat, wakeful at midnight, to receive you."

The incidents which Shasta perceived as misfortunes were orchestrated by Aslan, in his Divine Providence, for greater purposes.

=== "Narnia and the North!" ===
Bree and Shasta use the phrase "Narnia and the North" as their "rallying cry" as they make their escape from their life in Calormen. They are both motivated by a deep longing to find their way to their true homeland. In the setting of The Horse and His Boy, the reader finds a departure from the landscapes, culture, and people of the Narnian realms which have become familiar in the other books. The placement of the action in the realm of Calormen helps to convey a sense of "unbelonging" on the part of the characters and the reader, which reinforces the motif of longing for a true home.

== Allusions and references ==
The association of Cor with horses, and his twin brother Corin with boxing, recalls the traditional associations of the Spartan twins Castor and Pollux of Greek mythology.

Researcher Ruth North has noted that the plot element of a sinful human being transformed into a donkey as a punishment and then restored to humanity as an act of Divine mercy is reminiscent of The Golden Ass by Apuleius, a classic of Latin literature.

== Adaptations ==
BBC Radio 4 dramatised The Chronicles of Narnia, including The Horse and His Boy, in 1998. The dramatisation is entitled "The Complete Chronicles of Narnia: The Classic BBC Radio 4 Full-Cast Dramatisations".

Focus on the Family produced an audio dramatisation of The Horse and His Boy in 2000.

Walden Media made movie adaptations of The Lion, the Witch and the Wardrobe, Prince Caspian and The Voyage of the Dawn Treader. Walden Media obtained an option to make The Chronicles of Narnia: The Horse and His Boy in the future.

In 2022, The Logos Theater, of Taylors, South Carolina, created a stage adaptation of The Horse and His Boy, with later performances at the Museum of the Bible.
