= The Last Battle =

1956 children's novel by C. S. Lewis

- First edition dustjacket original
- Author: C. S. Lewis
- Illustrator: Pauline Baynes
- Cover artist: Pauline Baynes
- Language: English
- Series: The Chronicles of Narnia
- Release number: 7
- Genre: Children's fantasy novel, Christian literature
- Publisher: The Bodley Head
- Publication date: 4 September 1956
- Publication place: United Kingdom
- Media type: Print (hardcover)
- Pages: 184 pp (first edition); 42,854 words (US)
- ISBN: 978-0-00-671682-2 (full-colour; Collins, 1998)
- OCLC: 752428300
- LC Class: PZ8.L48 Las
- Preceded by: The Magician's Nephew
- Text: The Last Battle online

The Last Battle is a portal fantasy novel written by British author C. S. Lewis, published by The Bodley Head in 1956. It was the seventh and final novel in The Chronicles of Narnia (1950–1956). Like the other novels in the series, it was illustrated by Pauline Baynes and her work has been retained in many later editions.

The Last Battle is set almost entirely in the Narnia world and the English children who participate arrive only in the middle of the narrative. The novel is set some 200 Narnian years after The Silver Chair and about 2,500 years (and 49 Earth years) since the creation of the world narrated in The Magician's Nephew. (Note: In England, it is 1949, seven years after The Silver Chair and 49 years after The Magician's Nephew. A manuscript by Lewis, the "Outline of Narnian History", dates major events in the Narnia world and simultaneous events in England. Since his death, it has been published in books about Narnia.) A false Aslan is set up in the north-western borderlands and conflict between true and false Narnians merges with that between Narnia and Calormen, whose people worship Tash. It concludes with termination of the world by Aslan, after a "last battle" that is practically lost.

Macmillan US published an American edition within the calendar year.

== Plot ==
In the western regions of Narnia, the clever and greedy ape Shift persuades the naive donkey Puzzle to wear a lion's skin (an echo from Aesop's story of "The Ass in the Lion's Skin") and introduces him to the other Narnians as the Great Lion Aslan. Shift, posing as Aslan's spokesman, uses Aslan's name to persuade the Narnians to cut down the trees for lumber. Shift pockets the profits and garners support from the Calormenes – led by Rishda Tarkaan – by claiming that Aslan is another name for Tash, a bloodthirsty deity worshipped by the Calormenes. Those who question Shift's words are invited into a large stable where "Tashlan" is said to reside, only to be stealthily murdered by one of Rishda's men.

King Tirian, a descendant of King Caspian X, is warned by Roonwit the Centaur that strange and evil things are happening to Narnia and that the stars portend ominous developments. Tirian and his friend Jewel the Unicorn hear word of the death of the Dryads and rashly set out to confront the danger, instructing Roonwit to gather a small army to join them. Finding two Calormenes abusing a Narnian Talking Horse, Tirian and Jewel kill them both in a blind rage. Ashamed, they give themselves up to "Aslan".

Awaiting judgment, Tirian recognises the farce that Shift has fabricated in league with Rishda and the talking cat Ginger. When he accuses Shift of lying, Tirian is tied to a tree for the night to face judgment the following morning. While the woodland creatures are sympathetic to his suffering, they cannot bring themselves to defy "Aslan".

Tirian calls upon Aslan for help, and sees High King Peter and several others in a vision. He asks them to come to his aid. Shortly afterwards Eustace Scrubb and Jill Pole arrive in Narnia from Earth. They relate that Peter and Edmund Pevensie went to London to dig up the magic rings from the old house of Professor Kirke (mentioned in the previous story) in hopes that Jill and Eustace can use them to get to Narnia. But feeling a shock in their railway carriage on Earth, Eustace and Jill find themselves in Narnia without ever seeing the rings. Tirian gives Eustace and Jill a warm welcome.

They release Tirian and rescue Jewel. In the stable, Jill finds Puzzle, who comes to understand his folly and joins Tirian's side. A band of Dwarfs are also rescued, but their faith in Aslan has been shattered and they renounce their allegiance, proclaiming "the Dwarfs are for the Dwarfs". Only one Dwarf named Poggin remains faithful to Aslan and joins the group. Tirian learns that Shift and Rishda have inadvertently summoned the real Tash to Narnia when he and the others see him travelling north towards the stable.

Farsight the Eagle arrives bearing grim news: Roonwit and the Narnian army loyal to Tirian have all been massacred by the Calormenes who have taken Cair Paravel in Tirian's absence. Tirian and his small force advance on the stable to expose the truth of Shift's deception. Ginger, sent in to aid in the deception, runs out in terror, having lost his ability to speak. Emeth, one of Rishda's men and a devout follower of Tash, insists on seeing his god. Rishda tries to dissuade him, but Emeth enters the stable and finds another soldier who was stationed inside to murder the rebellious Narnians. Angry at the deception, he kills the soldier before vanishing.

Outside the stable, Tirian's group engages Shift and the Calormenes, but most of the remaining Narnians on either side are all either killed or thrown into the stable. Tirian throws Shift into the stable and Tash devours him. Realising that real danger lies in the stable, the terrified Rishda offers the remaining Narnians as sacrifices to avoid the wrath of Tash. Tirian, left alone and fighting for his life, drags Rishda into the stable and finds himself in a vast and lush plain. Tash seizes Rishda and advances on Tirian, but is stopped by the "Friends of Narnia": Digory Kirke, Polly Plummer, Peter Pevensie and his siblings Edmund and Lucy. Susan is absent as she has ceased to believe in Narnia. Peter orders Tash to return to his realm and Tash vanishes with Rishda in his clutches. Tirian discovers that the door to the stable has become a portal.

The real Aslan appears and praises Tirian for his valiant struggle in defense of Narnia. The faithless Dwarfs are present but cannot see they are in Aslan's country; they perceive themselves to be locked in an actual stable. Aslan demonstrates that, without their faith, even he cannot help them. With everything that's happened to Narnia, he brings the world to an end: Father Time is awoken and calls the stars down from the skies into the sea. The inhabitants of Narnia are brought back to life and gather outside the barn to be judged by Aslan. The faithful enter Aslan's country while those who have opposed or deserted him become ordinary animals and vanish in his shadow to a fate unknown even to the narrator. The vegetation is consumed by dragons, salamanders and giant lizards until they grow old, die, and rot into skeletal structures. Next, the seas and other waters rise to cover Narnia. The land freezes when Father Time puts out the sun after it destroys the moon. At Aslan's command, King Peter shuts the door on Narnia. Aslan leads the faithful to his country, telling them to go "further up and further in". Soon they encounter Emeth; Aslan has accepted his faithful service to Tash because it was offered in good faith and therefore truly done to Aslan, whereas Tash is served only by evil.

Aslan takes the Friends to a "true" version of Narnia, the previous Narnia having been an imperfect and corruptible shadow. As they advance, the Friends meet and reunite with characters from previous adventures who have been dead for centuries; Aslan reveals that the Friends may also stay as they had died in a train accident on Earth. Aslan sheds his lion form ("And as He spoke He no longer looked like a lion"), and the series ends with the revelation that this was only the beginning of the true story, "which goes on for ever, and in which every chapter is better than the one before".

== Main characters ==
- Tirian, the last king of Narnia, who leads the fight of Narnia against the Calormenes.
- Eustace Scrubb, a friend of Narnia and cousin to the Pevensie siblings, who fights for the Narnians.
- Jill Pole, a friend of Narnia, who fights for the Narnians.
- Jewel the Unicorn, retainer to King Tirian, also his best friend.
- Shift, an ape who allies with Calormen and creates the "Tashlan" hoax. (The Narnian form of the False Prophet and the Antichrist.)
- Puzzle, a donkey who is tricked by Shift. (The Narnian form of the Beast and an allusion to "The Ass in the Lion's Skin".)
- Rishda Tarkaan, Calormene captain leading the battle against Narnia, taken away by Tash during the destruction of Narnia.
- Ginger, a cat, in league with Rishda Tarkaan.
- Tash, the patron God of the Calormenes and evil counterpart to Aslan.
- Griffle, a black Dwarf, leader of a group of Dwarfs who have lost faith in both Aslan and Tash.
- Emeth, a righteous soldier of Calormene, who discovers his true devotion to Aslan.
- Aslan, the God of Narnia, son of the Emperor-over-the-Sea, who takes the form of a lion.

== Reception ==
Floyd C. Gale wrote in Galaxy Science Fiction that the book "is a delightful fantastic fable of the type which the English have excelled since—or perhaps because of—Lewis Carroll".

Lewis and The Last Battle won the annual Carnegie Medal from the Library Association, recognising the year's best children's book by a British subject. The author wrote to illustrator Pauline Baynes, "is it not rather 'our' medal? I'm sure the illustrations were taken into account as well as the text."

== Sources ==
- Caughey, Shanna (2004). Revisiting Narnia: Fantasy, Myth and Religion in C. S. Lewis' Chronicles. Benbella Books. ISBN 978-1-932100-63-1.
- Downing, David C. (2005). Into the Wardrobe: C. S. Lewis and the Narnia Chronicles. San Francisco: Jossey-Bass. ISBN 978-0-7879-7890-7.

Awards
Preceded by The Little Bookroom	Carnegie Medal recipient 1956	Succeeded by A Grass Rope
