= Lucy Pevensie =

Fictional character in The Chronicles of Narnia

- Narnia character
- Georgie Henley as Lucy in the 2008 film, The Chronicles of Narnia: Prince Caspian.
- First appearance: The Lion, the Witch and the Wardrobe (1950)
- Last appearance: The Last Battle (1956)
- Created by: C. S. Lewis

In-universe information
- Race: Human
- Gender: Female
- Title: Queen Lucy the Valiant
- Family: Mr and Mrs Pevensie (parents); Peter, Susan and Edmund Pevensie (older siblings)
- Relatives: Eustace Scrubb (cousin)
- Nationality: English

Lucy Pevensie is a fictional character in C. S. Lewis's The Chronicles of Narnia series. She is the youngest of the four Pevensie children and the first to find the Wardrobe entrance to Narnia in The Lion, the Witch and the Wardrobe. She is ultimately crowned Queen Lucy the Valiant, co-ruler of Narnia along with her two brothers, Edmund and Peter, and her sister, Susan. Lucy is the central character of the four siblings in the novels. She is also a principal character in three of the seven books (The Lion, the Witch and the Wardrobe, Prince Caspian, and The Voyage of the Dawn Treader), and a minor character in two others (The Horse and His Boy and The Last Battle).

The character of Lucy Pevensie was inspired by Jill Freud, a devout Catholic London girl evacuated by her convent to The Kilns, Lewis's country home in 1942, and named after Lewis's goddaughter Lucy Barfield, to whom he dedicated The Lion, The Witch and the Wardrobe.

Lucy is described in the book as being fair-haired: "But as for Lucy, she was always gay and golden-haired, and all princes in those parts desired her to be their Queen, and her people called her Queen Lucy the Valiant." She and her brothers Peter and Edmund, after dying in a train crash in England, were transported to Aslan's Country with the other Narnians.

== Character ==
Lucy is the most sensitive and faithful out of all her siblings, which is why she is written as seeing Aslan across the gorge in Prince Caspian, while her brothers and sister appeared more cynical. As a young child in The Lion, the Witch and the Wardrobe, escaping to the countryside from the London Blitz in World War II, she was extremely vulnerable and searching for security, wonder and something to believe in, something she finds upon entering the wardrobe. She was teased mercilessly by Edmund about Narnia, being accused of playing "childish games". Once she gleans that he had also visited the land in the wardrobe and still maintains the fact that Narnia is not real, her faith in humanity and the security of her own beliefs concerning her siblings were also under threat.

Lucy loves animals, befriending many creatures, and is devastated in Prince Caspian to discover that not only has Narnia been invaded by the Telmarines, but that they have suppressed the many creatures and divine and semi-divine beings that had once made Narnia the extraordinary place it was. Lucy has a great desire to help others, which is symbolised by the healing cordial that was given to her by Father Christmas for others in need. In The Lion, the Witch and the Wardrobe, she is taught by Aslan to use this power impartially and not focus on the needs of those she loves the most.

=== The Lion, the Witch and the Wardrobe ===
Lucy's siblings, Peter, Susan and Edmund, do not believe her about Narnia at first, but later they all find their way there.

Lucy is the first of the Pevensies to enter Narnia through a magical wardrobe in the Professor's old house. She finds herself there while it is under the rule of the White Witch during the Hundred-Year Winter. In Narnia, she meets Mr. Tumnus the Faun and later, the Beavers. However, her brother Edmund has also slipped into Narnia on the second occasion Lucy enters, and encounters the White Witch while she is visiting Mr. Tumnus. Edmund, who has already jeered at Lucy about her "magical" country, continues to be spiteful towards Lucy by denying that either of them has been in Narnia. When the children all enter Narnia, however, they discover that Mr Tumnus has been captured and imprisoned for failing to hand Lucy over to the White Witch.

While travelling with Peter, Susan and Mr. and Mrs. Beaver to the Stone Table, they meet Father Christmas, who gives them gifts. Lucy is given a vial with magical cordial that can heal almost any injury, and a small dagger with which to defend herself "a great need". She and her companions arrive at Aslan's camp, and later that night, she and Susan comfort Aslan as he walks to his death—although they do not know of his fate at the time. Both girls witness his sacrifice. While their brothers are going to war, Lucy and her sister see Aslan come back to life and help him wake the creatures (including Mr. Tumnus) in the White Witch's castle, after they have been imprisoned or turned to stone by the White Witch. They meet with their brothers at the end of the battle.

At Cair Paravel, she is crowned as Her Majesty Queen Lucy by Aslan to the throne as a co-ruler of Narnia, this marking the fulfilling of the ancient prophecy and the end of the White Witch's reign. During her reign, she is proclaimed Queen Lucy the Valiant. She and her siblings bring about the Golden Age in Narnia.

Years later, while hunting the White Stag through Lantern Waste, she and her siblings notice the lantern where she met Mr. Tumnus. The Pevensies return through the wardrobe into England, where no time has passed and they are children once again.

=== Prince Caspian ===
Lucy travels to Narnia again with her three siblings. She is the only one to see Aslan at first, and she has great difficulty convincing her brothers and sister as well as Trumpkin the dwarf that he had returned, echoing her trials early in the first book. However, Edmund believes her and backs her up. Aslan tells her to try again and says that she must follow him alone if they refuse to come with her. Lucy comments that Aslan has grown larger, but really she is the one who has grown.

=== The Voyage of the Dawn Treader ===
While Susan travels with Mr. and Mrs. Pevensie to America and Peter studies with Professor Digory Kirke, Lucy, Edmund and their cousin Eustace are drawn into Narnia through a magical painting in The Voyage of the Dawn Treader. Lucy is the viewpoint character for most of the narrative. However, in the end, Aslan firmly tells her and Edmund that they have become, like Susan and Peter, too old to further experience the wonders of Narnia.

=== The Horse and His Boy ===
The events in The Horse and His Boy take place after the siblings are crowned, and before they return to England, in The Lion, the Witch and the Wardrobe. Queen Lucy, now a young woman, rides to the aid of Archenland. She is described by Prince Corin as being "as good [in battle] as a man", unlike her sister, Queen Susan, who is a "proper lady". She helps King Lune to welcome Aravis to Anvard and attends the final confrontation with the defeated Prince Rabadash.

=== The Last Battle ===
In The Last Battle, she plays a minor part as she returns to Narnia again with her brothers, High King Peter and King Edmund, along with Eustace Scrubb, Jill Pole, Polly Plummer, and Digory Kirke. There, she witnesses the destruction of Narnia and lives in the new Narnia created by Aslan. In the new Narnia, all the people and animals who lived in the previous Narnia during its existence return, reuniting Lucy with Mr. Tumnus. Aslan reveals that she and all the other characters from the human world have died in a railway accident and are now enjoying a blessed eternity.

== Portrayals ==
- In the 1967 TV serial, she was portrayed by Liz Crowther.
- In the 1980s BBC serial, Lucy is portrayed by English actress Sophie Wilcox.
- In Disney's live-action films, Lucy is portrayed by Georgie Henley as a child and Rachael Henley (her older sister) as an adult in the end of the first film.

== Other appearances ==
Although reviews of The Oz/Wonderland Chronicles issue 0 indicated that Alice, Wendy Darling and Dorothy Gale shared their dorm with Susan Pevensie, a recent review of the now-released issue 1 indicates many fans are believing this is actually meant to be Lucy and not Susan.

She is spoofed in the 2007 film Epic Movie, played by Jayma Mays.
