= Peter Pevensie =

Fictional character in the Narnia universe

- Narnia character
- William Moseley as Peter Pevensie in the 2008 film, The Chronicles of Narnia: Prince Caspian.
- First appearance: The Lion, the Witch and the Wardrobe (1950)
- Last appearance: The Last Battle (1956)
- Created by: C. S. Lewis

In-universe information
- Race: Human
- Title: High King: Peter the Magnificent; Emperor of the Lone Islands; Lord of Cair Paravel; Knight of the Most Noble Order of the Lion; Sir Peter Wolf's-Bane
- Family: Mr. and Mrs. Pevensie (parents); Susan (younger sister); Edmund (younger brother); Lucy (youngest sister)
- Relatives: Eustace Scrubb (cousin)
- Nationality: English

Peter Pevensie is a fictional character in C. S. Lewis's The Chronicles of Narnia book series. Peter appears in three of the seven books; as a child and a principal character in The Lion, the Witch and the Wardrobe and Prince Caspian, and as an adult in The Last Battle. He is mentioned in The Horse and His Boy, in which he is away on the northern frontier fighting giants, and in The Voyage of the Dawn Treader, in which he is studying under the tutelage of Professor Kirke.

Peter is the eldest of the four Pevensie children and shares his adventures in Narnia with his sisters Susan and Lucy and with his brother Edmund.

Peter's reign in Narnia was a tetrarchy (Greek: "leadership of four"), and as High King Peter the Magnificent, he had supreme authority over all subsequent Narnian monarchs. Peter is illustrated by Pauline Baynes in the original novels with dark hair, but there are no specific descriptions of his hair or eye colour or complexion by Lewis.

== Name ==
An early draft of The Lion begins, "This book is about four children whose names were Ann, Martin, Rose, and Peter. But it is most about Peter who was the youngest." Peter is the only name that makes it into the final work, but as the oldest child instead of the youngest.

Pevensey, on the southeast coast of England, is the site of a medieval castle that figures importantly in British history at several points. In Rudyard Kipling's Puck of Pook's Hill (1907) at least one of the characters refers to Pevensey as "England's Gate", which the celebrated wardrobe in Lewis's books quite literally becomes. The surname "Pevensie" does not actually appear in the Chronicles until the third published book, The Voyage of the Dawn Treader.

== Biography ==
=== Prior story ===
Peter was born in 1927 and is 13 years old when he appears in The Lion, the Witch and the Wardrobe. As a monarch of Narnia's Golden Age, he rules with his brother and sisters for 15 years, reaching the approximate age of 28 before returning to the age of 13 in England at the end of Wardrobe. By The Last Battle he is a 22-year-old university student with his heart still in Narnia, though he had not been there since Prince Caspian, when he was 14 years old.

=== In The Lion, the Witch and the Wardrobe ===
Peter Pevensie in the 2005 film, The Chronicles of Narnia: The Lion, the Witch and the Wardrobe.

A loyal and devoted big brother figure, Peter is the eldest of the four siblings. He tries his best to protect his siblings and to act like a responsible young adult. In the book, it is implied that he is more mature than his siblings because after their father was called out to fight in the war, Peter's mother told him to support his three siblings through the ordeal of their father going away. He is evacuated to the countryside with his siblings by train because of the air-raids during World War II. In the countryside, they stay at the old mansion of Professor Digory Kirke.

When Lucy first stumbles on the wardrobe, Peter does not believe her, thinking it is just her imagination until he and the other Pevensies enter the wardrobe themselves; "A jolly good hoax, Lu". He later apologises to Lucy for not believing her and is quite angry with Edmund for earlier denying Narnia's existence (Lucy had seen Edmund in Narnia before, but he had lied that they were just "pretending"); "Well, of all the poisonous little beasts". This is caused by Edmund's revelation of his deceit when, upon entering Narnia, he says; "I say ... oughtn't we to be bearing a bit more to the left, that is, if we are aiming for the lamp-post?" Peter had already been angry with Edmund for "encouraging" Lucy before he knew that Edmund was telling lies; while not believing that Lucy had been in Narnia, he did believe that Edmund was not doing Lucy any good by jeering at her and encouraging her about her claim to have found a country in the wardrobe. During the period between Lucy claiming to have got into Narnia through the wardrobe a second time and all four siblings finally making it into Narnia together, Peter negotiates a truce between Edmund and Lucy, although his annoyance with Edmund is still visible.

Edmund later strays to the White Witch (having met her when he first came into Narnia and been seduced by her promises of power) and Peter later confesses to Aslan that his anger towards Edmund (for trying to make out that Lucy was a liar) probably helped him to go wrong. Peter and his siblings had been under the protection of Mr and Mrs. Beaver after arriving in Narnia, and Mr. Beaver had suspected Edmund was a traitor from the moment he set eyes on him, but did not mention anything to the others about it until his absence was noticed and Mr Beaver figured out that Edmund had gone to the White Witch. Edmund is eventually rescued on Aslan's orders. Meanwhile, the others all make their way to the Stone Table to meet Aslan.

Artist's impression of Peter's shield, described in chapter 10 of The Lion, the Witch and the Wardrobe as being "the colour of silver and across it there ramped a red lion".

Peter received his sword (Rhindon) and shield from Father Christmas after meeting him on the journey to find Aslan, and is later knighted "Sir Peter Wolf's-Bane" by Aslan after he kills Maugrim the wolf, chief of the White Witch's secret police, who was trying to kill Susan and Lucy. In the American editions of the books on which the 1979 animated film was based, Lewis changed the chief wolf's name to Fenris-Ulf, after a figure from Norse mythology. In those versions, Peter is given the epithet "Fenris-bane".

While the great battle is being planned, he is appointed head General of Aslan's army. After the defeat of the White Witch Jadis, self-styled Queen of Narnia, and her evil allies in the Battle of Beruna Ford, he is crowned to the Clear Northern Sky by Aslan as His Majesty King Peter the Magnificent, High King of Narnia, Emperor of the Lone Islands, Lord of Cair Paravel, Knight of the Most Noble Order of the Lion. The ancient prophecy of two Sons of Adam and two Daughters of Eve coming to sit on the four thrones at Cair Paravel then comes to fruition. This marks the end of the hundred years of winter and the reign of the White Witch, and is the beginning of Narnia's Golden Age.

He and his siblings finally return to their own world (where they find themselves as children once again) 15 years later, to find that no time had passed by there.

=== In The Horse and His Boy ===
Peter does not appear in this installment, but is mentioned. While Susan and Edmund are in Calormen escaping from Prince Rabadash, he is fighting giants in the north. (Lucy is the only one left at Cair Paravel.)

=== In Prince Caspian ===
After the Pevensies arrive in the ruins of Cair Paravel, they find the castle's treasure chamber, where Peter, Susan and Lucy find the gifts they were given by Father Christmas. Peter takes his sword, Rhindon, and his shield, and again serves as the leader of the group. They eventually meet Trumpkin, a dwarf who helped protect Prince Caspian X from his uncle's Telmarine army, who accompanies them on their journey to meet Aslan.

When the children are forced to make a decision, Peter, as High King, has the final word. In order to stall the war long enough for Lucy to find Aslan and awaken the Narnians, Peter claims the right to a one-on-one duel with the Telmarine king, Miraz. After the Pevensie children help defeat the Telmarines, Peter formally gives Caspian the authority to rule a free Narnia. Aslan gives Caspian the authority to "rule under Us and under the High King". However, Peter later confides to Lucy and Edmund that he was told by Aslan that he and Susan will never return to Narnia, as they are now too old, and have learned all that they can from that world.

The four children returned to their world, in which they were waiting for their trains to go to their respective boarding schools.

It is learned in this book that Lucy is his favourite sister, a fact that was fairly obvious throughout the series.

=== In Voyage of the Dawn Treader ===
While not physically present in the book, it was mentioned that Peter was under the tutelage of Professor Kirke in preparation for exams, but the other three children were unable to stay with him because he had moved out of the large house with the wardrobe and was now living in a much smaller house. In the film The Chronicles of Narnia: The Voyage of the Dawn Treader, Peter makes a cameo appearance at a party. When Lucy transforms herself into Susan, neither Peter nor Edmund know of Lucy or Narnia.

=== In The Last Battle ===
Peter has a minor role in the story. He was the only one to address Tirian, the king of Narnia at the time, in Tirian's vision of the Seven Friends of Narnia.

After attending a dinner with the other Friends, Peter and Edmund went to London to retrieve the magic rings that Professor Digory Kirke buried in the Ketterleys' yard, hoping to use them to get Eustace and Jill to Narnia. Both were waiting for Lucy, Eustace, Jill, Digory, and Polly at the station platform when the train crashed and killed them all, temporarily transporting Jill and Eustace to Narnia until the end of the world, upon which they make their way to the real Narnia, or heaven, and are reunited with Peter, Edmund, Lucy, Digory, and Polly.

Peter is described by Tirian as having the face of a king and a warrior. After Tirian passed through the stable door and saw Tash for the first time, Peter calmly ordered the demon to leave with his prey. After passing judgement on all the inhabitants of Narnia, Aslan orders Peter to shut the door, ending the world. Peter is one of many others allowed to stay in Aslan's Country including the parents of Peter, Edmund, Susan and Lucy.

== Christian elements ==
Lewis, himself an expert on allegory, did not consider The Chronicles of Narnia allegory. He saw them as "suppositional" answering the question, "What might Christ become like, if there really were a world like Narnia and He chose to be incarnate and die and rise again in that world as He actually has done in ours? This is not allegory at all." While not allegorical, Narnia does present significant parallels with elements from Christianity.

There are similarities between Peter Pevensie and St. Peter, who was one of Jesus's original twelve disciples. Like St. Peter, who was given that name from Christ, Peter Pevensie is given the name Sir Peter Wolfsbane by Aslan. As the traditional first Bishop of Rome, St. Peter and his successors, are primus inter pares, or first-among-equals with the other leaders of the church. Similarly, Peter Pevensie is given the title of High King. Lastly the biblical St. Peter, according to Catholic tradition, was given the "keys to the kingdom of heaven" and Peter Pevensie shut the door, locking it with a golden key, sealing the destroyed Narnia after the judgment in The Last Battle.

== Portrayals ==
- In the 1967 TV serial, he is portrayed by Paul Waller.
- In the 1988 television serial produced by the BBC, The Lion, the Witch and the Wardrobe, he is portrayed by actor Richard Dempsey.
- In Disney's live-action films, he is portrayed by William Moseley as a child; and Noah Huntley as an adult in the end of the first film.
- In the late-1990s/early-2000s radio adaptations produced by Focus on the Family Radio Theatre, he is voiced as a child by Freddie Findlay and by Peter Moreton as an adult.
- In the parody film Epic Movie, he is spoofed by Adam Campbell under the name "Peter Pervertski".
