= Outline of Narnia =

Overview of and topical guide to Narnia

The following outline is provided as an overview of and topical guide to Narnia:

Narnia – fantasy world created by C. S. Lewis as the primary location for his series of seven fantasy novels for children, The Chronicles of Narnia. The series tracks the story of Narnia when humans, usually children, enter the Narnian world from 'our world', or Earth, and meet Aslan, the creator of the world, in the book. The world is named after the country of Narnia, in which much of the action of the Chronicles takes place. In Narnia, some animals can talk, mythical beasts abound, and magic is common.

== What type of thing is Narnia? ==
Narnia can be described as all of the following:

- Fiction – form of narrative which deals, in part or in whole, with events that are not factual, but rather, imaginary and invented by its author(s). Although fiction often describes a major branch of literary work, it is also applied to theatrical, cinematic, and musical work.
  - Fantasy fiction – form of narrative from the genre of fiction that commonly uses magic and other supernatural phenomena as a primary plot element, theme, or setting. Many works within the genre take place in imaginary worlds where magic and magical creatures are common.
    - High fantasy fiction – a type of fantasy fiction defined either by its setting in an imaginary world or by the epic stature of its characters, themes and plot. The term "high fantasy" was coined by Lloyd Alexander in a 1971 essay, "High Fantasy and Heroic Romance".
    - a fantasy world – fictional setting comprising an entire planet, used in fantasy fiction, for example in novels and games. Typical worlds involve magic or magical abilities and often, but not always, either a medieval or futuristic theme. Some worlds may be a parallel world tenuously connected to Earth via magical portals or items; a fictional Earth set in the remote past or future; or an entirely independent world set in another universe.
  - a fictional setting –
    - a fictional universe – a universe that is made up. The Chronicles of Narnia describe a fictional universe with many worlds and dimensions, including Earth, Narnia, and others.
      - a constructed world –
        - a fantasy world – fictional setting comprising an entire planet, used in fantasy fiction, for example in novels and games. Typical worlds involve magic or magical abilities and often, but not always, either a medieval or futuristic theme. Some worlds may be a parallel world tenuously connected to Earth via magical portals or items; a fictional Earth set in the remote past or future; or an entirely independent world set in another universe.
        - a paracosm –
      - a fictional parallel universe –
- Intellectual property – creations of the mind. Intangible assets, such as musical, literary, and artistic works.
  - a media franchise – collection of media whereby intellectual property (IP) is licensed from an original work of media (usually a work of fiction), such as a film, a work of literature, a television program or a video game, to other parties or partners for commercial exploitation. A property can be exploited across a range of mediums and by a variety of industries for merchandising purposes. Narnia has been marketed in the form of books and movies, soundtracks (music) of the movies are available, and Narnian characters have been portrayed on T-shirts, have been sold as toys, etc.

== The Chronicles of Narnia media franchise ==
- Published works
  - Author: C.S. Lewis
    - The Chronicles of Narnia – series of seven high fantasy novels by C. S. Lewis, about the adventures of children who play central roles in the unfolding history of the fictional realm of Narnia, a place where animals talk, magic is common, and good battles evil. It is considered a classic of children's literature and is the author's best-known work, having sold over 100 million copies in 47 languages.
      - The Lion, the Witch and the Wardrobe – Peter, Susan, Edmund, and Lucy Pevensie are transported to the mystical land of Narnia through a magical wardrobe. It is the first book in the series, but the second story chronologically (the first being The Magician's Nephew). It is the best known story of the series, and the most widely held in libraries.
      - Prince Caspian – the four Pevensie children return to Narnia about one year later in England but 1300 years later in Narnia. During their absence, they have become legendary Kings and Queens of Narnia. Prince Caspian, a refugee from his own land, magically recalls them for assistance and they arrive as children once again.
      - The Voyage of the Dawn Treader – features a second return to the Narnia world, about three years later in Narnia and one year later in England, by Edmund and Lucy Pevensie. Prince Caspian is now King Caspian X. He leads a sea voyage to the eastern end of the world, which the English siblings and their cousin Eustace Scrubb magically join soon after his ship Dawn Treader sets sail.
      - The Silver Chair – set primarily in the world of Narnia, decades after The Voyage of the Dawn Treader there but less than a year later in England. King Caspian X is now an old man but his son and only heir Prince Rilian is missing. Aslan the lion sends two children from England to Narnia on a mission to resolve the mystery: Eustace Scrubb, and Jill Pole.
      - The Horse and His Boy – the only Narnia chronicle that features native rather than English children as the main characters and the only one set entirely in the Narnia world. It is set during the last chapter of the inaugural The Lion, the Witch, and the Wardrobe; that is, during the reign of the four Pevensie children as Kings and Queens of Narnia. The story features two children and two talking horses fleeing north through Calormen to Narnia; while in Calormen's capital city, they discover a raid being planned on Narnia's southern neighbor Archenland.
      - The Magician's Nephew – prequel which features the creation of the Narnia world by Aslan the lion, centered at a lamp-post brought by accidental observers Digory Kirke and Polly Plummer, from London during year 1900. The story also presents the origin story of Jadis (The White Witch).
      - The Last Battle – set almost entirely in the Narnia world and the English children who participate arrive only in the middle of the narrative. The novel is set some 200 Narnian years after The Silver Chair and about 2500 years since the creation of the world narrated in The Magician's Nephew. A false Aslan is set up in the north-western borderlands and conflict between true and false Narnians merges with that between Narnia and Calormen, whose people worship Tash. It concludes with termination of the world by Aslan, after the "last battle".
- Adaptations of The Chronicles of Narnia (films, etc.)
  - The Lion, the Witch and the Wardrobe (ITV TV serial) (1967 TV serial)
  - The Lion, the Witch and the Wardrobe (Animated TV film) (1979 film)
  - The Chronicles of Narnia (BBC TV serial)
    - Season 1 (1988): The Lion, the Witch and the Wardrobe
    - Season 2 (1989): Prince Caspian/The Voyage of the Dawn Treader
    - Season 3 (1990): The Silver Chair
  - BBC Radio 4 serial (audio cassettes, CDs, and digital downloads/Audible)
  - Focus on the Family Radio Theatre series (cassette tapes, CDs, and digital downloads)
  - The Chronicles of Narnia (film series, and related products)
    - The Chronicles of Narnia: The Lion, the Witch and the Wardrobe (2005)
      - The Chronicles of Narnia: The Lion, the Witch and the Wardrobe (soundtrack)
      - The Chronicles of Narnia: The Lion, the Witch and the Wardrobe (video game)
    - The Chronicles of Narnia: Prince Caspian (2008)
      - The Chronicles of Narnia: Prince Caspian (soundtrack)
      - The Chronicles of Narnia: Prince Caspian (video game)
    - The Chronicles of Narnia: The Voyage of the Dawn Treader (2010)
      - The Chronicles of Narnia: The Voyage of the Dawn Treader (soundtrack)
      - The Chronicles of Narnia: The Voyage of the Dawn Treader (video game)
    - About the series
      - List of cast members of The Chronicles of Narnia film series
      - Music of The Chronicles of Narnia film series
      - List of accolades received by The Chronicles of Narnia film series
  - Narnia: The Magician's Nephew (2027 film)

== Characters of Narnia ==
Some characters from throughout Narnia:

=== Human characters ===
- Prince Caspian – also known as Caspian X, was crowned King of Narnia with the help of Aslan and the Pevensie children. Afterwards, he voyages to the edge of the world in his ship, the Dawn Treader. Father of Prince Rilian, who was taken from him just after the death of his wife from a serpent attack. His descendants were:
  - Rilian – only son of King Caspian X, who fell under the enchantment of the Green Witch (Lady of the Green Kirtle) for ten years.
    - Erlian – Father of King Tirian and the sixth king of Narnia in the line of Rilian.
      - Tirian – protagonist of The Last Battle, in which he is the last King of Narnia, who has to defend his kingdom against subversion and invasion. He is well respected by the Narnians, and a skilled swordsman. He is descended from Prince Caspian, and is the son of King Erlian.
- Cor – King of Archenland after Lune. His Calormene foster father called him Shasta. He traveled from Archenland with Aravis, Hwin, and Bree. He married Aravis.
- Coriakin – wizard encountered in The Voyage of the Dawn Treader. Coriakin was originally a star, who, as reparation for past misdeeds was charged by Aslan to rule the Duffers and guide them to wisdom. The nature of Coriakin's misdeeds is not specified.
- Lord Drinian – captain of the Dawn Treader, friend of Prince Rilian and his father King Caspian X.
- Digory Kirke – he's the Magician's Nephew, and was there (with Polly Plummer) when Narnia was created. As a child who reached Narnia from his home in London, he faced Jadis, before she became the White Witch. By 1940, he was the professor with whom the Pevensie children stayed during World War II. He had a wardrobe made from the wood of a tree grown from the seed of a magic apple he acquired during his adventures on the world of Narnia.
- Frank and Helen – first rulers of Narnia. Prior to this, Frank and Helen were both country folk, who lived in London due to economic necessity, in or about 1900AD. Frank drove a horse-drawn carriage while Helen kept house, before the Magician's Nephew brought Jadis to town.
- Miraz – usurping king of Narnia, son of Caspian VIII. He killed his brother, Caspian IX, in order to assume the throne just after the birth of his nephew, Prince Caspian.
- Pevensie children
  - Peter Pevensie – friend of Narnia, High King of Narnia, The Magnificent, Lord of Cair Paravel, Emperor of the Lone Islands.
  - Susan Pevensie – eldest sister and the second eldest Pevensie child. She appears in three of the seven books—as a child in The Lion, the Witch and the Wardrobe and Prince Caspian, and as an adult in The Horse and His Boy. She is also mentioned in The Voyage of the Dawn Treader and The Last Battle. During her reign at the Narnian capital of Cair Paravel, she is known as Queen Susan the Gentle or Queen Susan of the Horn.
  - Edmund Pevensie – friend of Narnia, King of Narnia, The Just.
  - Lucy Pevensie – friend of Narnia, Queen of Narnia, The Valiant.
- Polly Plummer – friend and neighbor of the Magician's Nephew (Digory Kirke). With him, discovered the Wood between the Worlds, Charn, and the world of Narnia (at the Lantern Waste).
- Jill Pole – friend of Narnia, adventuress who is first seen and mentioned in The Silver Chair, and is with Eustace on his return to Narnia.
- Ramandu – star, father-in-law of Caspian X
- Ramandu's daughter – daughter of Ramandu, she is unnamed in the books. She marries Caspian X, and is killed by a green serpent, later revealed to be the Lady of the Green Kirtle.
- Eustace Scrubb – friend of Narnia, cousin of the Pevensies, who joins his two youngest cousins on their return to Narnia and then returns a year later with his friend Jill Pole.
- Seven Great Lords of Narnia
  - Lord Argoz – found in a deep sleep on the Island of Ramandu
  - Lord Bern – Duke of the Lone Islands
  - Lord Mavramorn – found in a deep sleep on the Island of Ramandu
  - Lord Octesian – believed to have died on Dragon Island
  - Lord Restimar – died on Deathwater
  - Lord Revilian – found in a deep sleep on the Island of Ramandu
  - Lord Rhoop – rescued from the Dark Island
- Shasta – young boy brought up by Arsheesh, meets the talking horse Bree, who persuades him to escape Calormen by riding north for Narnia. Shasta discovers he is really Prince Cor of Archenland, and helps to save Narnia from invasion. He eventually becomes the King Cor of Archenland.
- Emeth Tarkaan – young Calormene officer, second in command of a detachment of the Tisroc's soldiers under Rishda Tarkaan who enter Narnia in the guise of merchants. This is as part of a conspiracy to seize the north of the country by using the Narnians' faith in a false Aslan controlled by the ape Shift.
- Aravis Tarkheena – daughter of a Calormene nobleman. She flees on her horse to escape an arranged marriage. Her horse, Hwin, is revealed to be a talking beast from the land of Narnia. Aravis overhears a plot by the Calormenes to invade Archenland and Narnia, and along with Hwin, Shasta, and Bree, warns the Archenlanders in time to thwart the invasion. Aravis eventually marries Shasta, to become Queen of Archenland.
- The Tisroc – supreme ruler of Calormen
  - Prince Rabadash – Crown Prince and later Tisroc of Calormen. He led the failed Calormene invasion of Narnia. Called "Rabadash the Peacemaker" to his face, and "Rabadash the Ridiculous" behind his back.
- Hermit of the Southern March - a wise old man who lived on the southern border of Archenland. At the age of 109, he took care of Aravis, Hwin, and Bree after they were chased by Aslan to his door.

=== Creature characters ===
- Talking animals
  - Aslan – Great Lion, the Son of the Emperor-Beyond-the-Sea, the Lord of Cair Paravel, the Emperor of the Lone Islands, High King of All High Kings and the Creator and Lord of Narnia. More than just a talking lion, Aslan uses the power of Deeper Magic from before the Dawn of Time. Aslan is the only character to appear in all 7 books of the series.
  - Mr. and Mrs. Beaver
    - Mr Beaver – builder of the dam near Beaversdam, he is the first Narnian to meet all four Pevensie children. He and his wife shelter the children and tell them of Narnia before leading them to Aslan
    - Mrs Beaver – she and Mr. Beaver provide shelter, food, and information for the four Pevensie children. When the White Witch sends an army of wolves after the children, Mr. and Mrs. Beaver escort the children to the Stone Table to meet Aslan. She makes good tea, but according to Mr Beaver is an indifferent cook.
  - Reepicheep – Chief Mouse of Narnia, member of the Most Noble Order of the Lion, famed for his courage and skill with a rapier. He fights for Prince Caspian and later travels with him to the end of the world.
  - Shift – ape, influenced the donkey Puzzle to impersonate Aslan and gain control over Narnia. The Calormenes were later able to take over Narnia because of this. Ultimately, Shift is devoured by Tash.
  - Talking horses
    - Breehy-hinny-brinny-hoohy-hah (Bree for short) – horse, escaped captivity from Calormen and carries Shasta in his travels with Aravis
    - Hwin – talking mare from Narnia, but brought up in captivity in Calormen; carries Aravis in her travels with Shasta
  - Maugrim – talking wolf, Captain of the White Witch's secret police during her 100-year wintry reign of Narnia. Killed by King Peter. He is called Fenris Ulf in some American editions of the books.
- Centaurs – Centaurs in Narnia are half-horse, half-human, just as they are in Greek mythology. The Narnian centaurs are always seen positively, unlike the centaurs of Greek mythology. In all their Narnia appearances they are seen as wise prophets or sages, loyal courtiers and majestic, powerful warriors.
  - Glenstorm – leading centaur in the Narnian Revolution.
  - Roonwit – warns King Tirian of impending catastrophe, and is slain in the Cair Paravel massacre.
- Dwarves
  - Trumpkin – Red Dwarf, seeks out Pevensies
- Puddleglum – marshwiggle, acts as a guide to Eustace and Jill as they journey through Ettinsmoor in search of Prince Rilian
- Tash – inexorable, god of the Calormenes, a skeletal figure with the head of a vulture and four arms, who demands blood sacrifices
- Tumnus – faun, befriends Lucy when she first arrives in Narnia and saves her from the White Witch.
- Witches – the witches of Narnia are evil and possess great magical power. Jadis is from another world and so is known to be not human, though she is very human-like. The species of the Green Lady is unknown, but she appears to be human.
  - Lady of the Green Kirtle – queen of the Underland, a powerful sorceress who kidnapped and enslaved Prince Rilian of Narnia and a horde of gnomes by her witchcraft, and planned to use them in a plot to take over Narnia. She is foiled by three friends of Aslan: Eustace Scrubb, Jill Pole, and Puddleglum.
  - White Witch – or Queen Jadis of Charn. Once ruler of the dead world of Charn, she subsequently enslaved Narnia in a 100-year winter

== Cosmology of The Chronicles of Narnia universe ==
- Worlds and dimensions
  - Narnia (world)
  - Alambil – "Lady of Peace", a planet (moving star) in the heavens above Narnia
  - Earth (circa 1945)
  - Aslan's Country
  - Homeworld (unnamed) of Jadis, the White Witch – all life on the world had been destroyed by Jadis through an evil magic spell. Rivers have dried up, and not even weeds or insects live.
    - Charn – birthplace of Jadis, and capital of its world. When visited briefly by Digory and Polly, the protagonists of The Magician's Nephew, the city is totally deserted, lifeless and crumbling, under a dying sun.
  - Wood between the Worlds
- Supernatural or superpower beings
  - Aslan
  - White Witch
  - Tash

== Geography of Narnia ==
- Narnia (world) – fantasy world created by C. S. Lewis as the primary location for his series of seven fantasy novels for children, The Chronicles of Narnia. The world is so called after the country of Narnia, in which much of the action of the Chronicles takes place.

=== Nations and large regions ===
- Narnia (country) – the country, of the world of the same name, around which the books revolve.
- Archenland – nation to the south of Narnia, and to the north of both nations' occasional (and final) enemy, Calormen.
- Calormen – large country to the southeast of Narnia. Narnia and Calormen are separated by a large desert and the country of Archenland. It's unknown if the Great Desert was a part of Calormen or if it was a country in its own right.
- Telmar – home of the Telmarines, people descended from pirates who came from Earth through a rare gateway between the worlds. Prince Caspian, Miraz, Queen Prunaprismia, Lord Glozelle, and Lord Sopespian are Telmarines.
- Underland – lying beneath the land of Narnia, Underland appears mainly in The Silver Chair, where Eustace Scrubb and Jill Pole travel under the ground to reach it in their search for Prince Rilian. They find him in Underland and release him from his enchantment by The Lady of the Green Kirtle.
- Ettinsmoor - a largely cold barren plane, inhabited mostly by giants and dragons. In earlier centuries the giants used to be civilized and built structures all over their country, including the Great Bridge to their northern neighbor over a deep gorge. In later centuries, however, they degenerated into their brutish selves and their society became anarchistic.
- Wild Lands of the North - A grimmer land north of Ettinsmoor of snow-topped mountains. Close to its own northern border was the castle of Harfang, the home of the so-called "gentle giants", which is nearby the Ruined City of the Giants, a remnant, likely the capital of a long-bygone empire of giants and ettins. Beyond this nation is presumably an icy tundra, which like the Great Desert, could be a country in its own right, which in turn is attached to Aslan's Country.
- Bism - a fiery utopia at the bottom of the Narnian world, inhabited by gnomes and salamanders. The Lady of the Green Kirtle cast a spell on the Gnomes also known as Earthmen to be summed up into Underland and under their hypnotic spell dig a tunnel to conquer Narnia. When the lady has been defeated the Gnomes happily return to their homeland.

=== Natural features ===
- Lantern Waste – at the beginning of the world of Narnia, this was a wasteland and the location where Aslan breathed life into the world. It became a woodland, and along with the trees there grew a lamppost with a magical lantern that never extinguished - a major landmark throughout The Chronicles of Narnia. The Lantern Waste is the first Narnian setting introduced in The Lion, The Witch and The Wardrobe. It is described as both the start and end of Narnia. It links directly to Earth from the wardrobe.
- Western March – (not to be confused with Narnia's neighbor the Western Wild) is a county in the west most Narnia. Its borders were between the Lamppost in Lantern Waste and the Great Waterfall at the western mountains. There are a few talking beasts here but notable sentient animals include the ape Shif and the donkey Puzzle. In the Age of Winter, Mr. Tumnus mistakenly calls this "country" "Spare Oom" and the "city" "Wardrobe" within it, and in the Later Ages, for unknown reasons, outlaws from this region had waged two wars with the Narnian government. This implies that it's a breakaway state.

=== Cities, fortresses, and other populated places ===
- Anvard – moatless castle where King Lune of Archenland resides, made of red-brown stones and sits on a green lawn in front of a high woody ridge.
- Cair Paravel – castle where the Kings and Queens of Narnia rule. It is the location of the four thrones of High King Peter the Magnificent, Queen Susan the Gentle, King Edmund the Just, and Queen Lucy the Valiant.
- Tashbaan – large city and capital of Calormen.

=== Other places ===
- Aslan's How – construction located south of the Great River in Narnia next to the Great Woods. It was built over the Hill of the Stone Table.

== Fictional history of Narnia ==
- The Last Battle (the Battle of Stable Hill) –
- Hundred-Year Winter – perpetual winter created by a spell of the White Witch in the country of Narnia. The final days of the Hundred Year Winter occur during The Lion, the Witch, and the Wardrobe, after the arrival of the Pevensie children.

== Other items or objects ==
- Dawn Treader – Narnian ship built by King Caspian X and is featured primarily in the book The Voyage of the Dawn Treader. It was the first Narnian ship to be built since the Golden Age and was commissioned by King Caspian, so that he might sail beyond the Lone Islands and on to the unknown Eastern Ocean to seek the Seven Great Lords – friends of his father who had disappeared during the reign of Miraz as Lord Protector of Narnia after he had murdered King Caspian IX.
- The Lantern – a mysterious lamp post with an everburning lantern out in the middle of nowhere in Narnia, in The Lion, the Witch and the Wardrobe. It grew from an iron rod brought to Narnia by Jadis (the White Witch) which she tore from a lamppost in 19th century London (in The Magician's Nephew). See also the Lantern Waste.

== Spells ==
- Deplorable Word – magical curse which ends all life on the world of Charn except that of the one who speaks it (Jadis, who later became the White Witch)
- Winter spell – spell cast by the White Witch, Jadis, to make it Winter all year round, but never reach Christmas. It was the cause of the Hundred-Year Winter in the country of Narnia.

== See also ==
- The Kilns – house on the outskirts of Headington Quarry, where the author C. S. Lewis wrote all of his famous Narnia books and other classics
- Religion in The Chronicles of Narnia
