= List of The Chronicles of Narnia (film series) cast members =

The following is a list of cast members who have portrayed characters in The Chronicles of Narnia film series. The Chronicles of Narnia is based upon the novels of the same name by C. S. Lewis.

== List ==
List indicators

This section includes characters who will appear or have appeared in the series.

- An empty grey cell indicates the character was not in the film, or that the character's official presence has not yet been confirmed.
- ^{C} indicates a cameo role.
- ^{O} indicates an older version of the character.
- ^{V} indicates a voice-only role.

Role	The Lion, the Witch and the Wardrobe	Prince Caspian	The Voyage of the Dawn Treader
Travelers to Narnia
Lucy Pevensie	Georgie Henley Rachael Henley^{O}	Georgie Henley	Georgie Henley
Edmund Pevensie	Skandar Keynes Mark Wells^{O}	Skandar Keynes	Skandar Keynes
Peter Pevensie	William Moseley Noah Huntley^{O}	William Moseley	William Moseley^{C}
Susan Pevensie	Anna Popplewell Sophie Winkleman^{O}	Anna Popplewell	Anna Popplewell^{C}
Prof. Digory Kirke	Jim Broadbent		
Eustace Scrubb			Will Poulter
Best friends of the Pevensies in Narnia
Mr. Tumnus (Faun)	James McAvoy		
Mr. Beaver	Ray Winstone^{V}		
Mrs. Beaver	Dawn French^{V}		
Trumpkin (Dwarf)		Peter Dinklage	
Supernatural creatures
Aslan (Lion)	Liam Neeson^{V}	Liam Neeson^{V}	Liam Neeson^{V}
Father Christmas	James Cosmo		
Lilliandil (Star)			Laura Brent
Aslan's army
Fox	Rupert Everett^{V}		
Oreius (Centaur)	Patrick Kake		
Griffin	Cameron Rhodes^{V}		
Philipp, the Horse	Philip Steuer^{V}		
Green Dryad	Katrina Browne		
Caspian's army
King Caspian X.		Ben Barnes	Ben Barnes
Nikarbrik (Dwarf)		Warwick Davis	
Truffle Hunter (Badger)		Ken Stott^{V}	
Glenstorm (Centaur)		Cornell John	
Bulgy Bear		David Walliams^{V}	
Asterius (Minotaurus)		Shane Rangi Josh Campbell^{V}	
Pattertwig (Squirrel)		Harry Gregson-Williams^{V}	
Peepiceek (Mouse)		Sim Evan-Jones^{V}	
White Witch and her followers
Jadis, the White Witch	Tilda Swinton	Tilda Swinton^{C}	Tilda Swinton^{C}
Ginarrbrik (Dwarf)	Kiran Shah		
Maugrim (Wolf)	Michael Madsen^{V}		
General Otmin (Minotaurus)	Shane Rangi		
Vardan (Wolf)	Jim May^{V}		
Were Wolf		Shane Rangi Tim Hands^{V}	
Hag		Klára Issová	
Miraz family and servants
King Miraz		Sergio Castellitto	
General Glozelle		Pierfrancesco Favino	
Doctor Cornelius (Half-blood Dwarf)		Vincent Grass	
Prunaprismia		Alicia Borrachero	
King Kaspian IX.			Nathaniel Parker
Telmarine lords
Sopespian		Damián Alcázar	
Scythley		Simón Andreu	
Donnon		Predrag Bjelac	
Bern			Terry Norris
Rhoop			Bruce Spence
Crew of the Dawn Treader
Reepicheep (Mouse)		Eddie Izzard^{V}	Simon Pegg^{V}
Drinian			Gary Sweet
Tavros (Minotaurus)			Shane Rangi
Rynelf			Tony Nixon
Cruickshanks (Dwarf)			Chris Cruickshanks
Nausus (Faun)			Steven Rooke
Caprius (Satyr)			Ryan Ettridge
Residents of the Lonely Islands
Coriakin (Magician)			Bille Brown
Chief Dufflepad			Roy Billing
Second Dufflepad			Neil Young
Third Dufflepad			Greg Poppleton
Fourth Dufflepud			Nicholas Neild
Rhince			Arthur Angel
Gael			Arabella Morton
Alane			Rachel Blakely
Slave Holder			Colin Moody
Slave Trader			David Vallon
Residents of Earth
Mrs. Macready	Elizabeth Hawthorne		
Helen Pevensie	Judy McIntosh		
Boy at the Train Station		Ashley Jones	

== See also ==
- List of actors who have played Narnia characters
