= Magical creatures in The Chronicles of Narnia =

Aspect of the Narnia universe

Magical creatures are an important aspect of the fictional world of Narnia contained within The Chronicles of Narnia book series and connected media originally created by C. S. Lewis. Throughout the seven books of the series, the protagonists encounter a variety of these creatures as they travel throughout Narnia and the surrounding lands and seas, including Archenland, Calormen, and the Great Eastern Ocean.

Much of Lewis' Narnian mythology references Greek, Norse, Arthurian, and Christian mythologies, among others. As a member of the Inklings literary group, Lewis was a contemporary of other authors of fiction such as J. R. R. Tolkien, and as such they held much discourse regarding different approaches to world-building.

Some magical creatures are simply larger, talking versions of real animals such as beavers, bears, mice, and wolves. Other magical creatures are traditional figures associated with various mythologies such as fauns, satyrs, centaurs, and dryads. Lewis' mythology also includes various deities and species of his own creation.

== Background ==
At the time C. S. Lewis wrote The Chronicles of Narnia, he was a devout Christian. Much of this is reflected through the books, which prominently utilize allegories and symbolism to retell biblical stories, or illustrate a religious conversion and life of faith, in this fantastical setting. Perhaps most famously, Lewis wrote the character of Aslan to reflect the figure Jesus Christ, mirroring the same journey of a sacrificial death and resurrection as found in the Gospels. Tolkien and others have criticized Lewis' work as merely a thinly veiled allegory, though supporters argue that his work is much more nuanced than it may initially appear.

In addition to the prominent Christian message that he sought to present, Lewis brings in figures from Greco-Roman and Norse mythology, Turkish tradition, and even specific European folk characters such as Father Christmas.

== List of creatures ==
=== Centaurs ===
Centaurs are creatures with the upper torso of a human and the lower legs and body of a horse, just as they appear in Greek mythology. Unlike most of their counterparts in the Greek myths (which are portrayed as wild, violent, lustful, and intoxicated), Narnian centaurs are always seen in a positive light, more in line with the unique Greek figure Chiron. Throughout the books, they are seen as wise prophets, sages, and loyal courtiers. Typically, they are highly skilled in astronomy and divination, using this ability to read the stars and tell of future events. In addition, they are usually proficient warriors, using their great size and strength to their advantage. Centaurs are viewed as some of the most majestic and powerful creatures in Narnia, and as such, fellow Narnians place a great deal of respect on any member of this species.

Centaurs appear in five out of seven books in the Chronicles of Narnia series, two out of three Disney film adaptations, and other assorted television specials and series based on the works of C. S. Lewis.

In The Lion, the Witch and the Wardrobe (1950), four centaurs are listed among the ranks of Aslan's loyal army, described as looking like part English farm horse and part giant from the perspective of the Pevensie children. The centaurs are part of the task force sent to help rescue Edmund from the White Witch, and all four later participate in the climactic battle against her. In addition, at least two more appear as stone statues in the White Witch's castle, and they are rescued and restored by Aslan as reinforcements for the main army. In the 2005 Disney film adaptation, Aslan's army is much larger than the book, with dozens of centaurs, both male and female, participating in the battle against the White Witch. The film also introduces Oreius, portrayed by Patrick Kake, who is featured prominently as the field leader of the army until the Pevensies arrive. Similar to the books, Oreius leads a team to help rescue Edmund from the White Witch, and he later helps Peter organize the troops following Aslan's death. During the battle, Oreius and a rhinoceros hold off the enemy army to buy time so that Peter and the others can fall back, with Oreius being turned into stone by the White Witch after killing her minotaur general. Oreius attends the Pevensies' coronation, having apparently been resurrected by Aslan offscreen.

Centaurs take their most prominent role in Prince Caspian (1951) in the form of Glenstorm and his three sons as part of the Narnian resistance against the Telmarine occupation. Glenstorm operates as one of the primary supporters of Prince Caspian, as his abilities as a prophet and astronomer make him aware of the coming conflict and Caspian's position as the rightful king, based on the movement of the heavenly bodies Tarva and Alambil. Glenstorm's stance helps alleviate much of the skepticism from the other Narnians at the Council of Dancing Lawn. Later, Glenstorm acts as one of Peter's marshals in the latter's duel with Miraz. Cornell John portrayed Glenstorm in the Disney film adaptation.

In The Silver Chair (1953), a centaur healer named Cloudbirth is referenced, and two unnamed centaurs provide more insight into the nature of the species. These two allow Eustace and Jill to ride them, an honor that had and would never be replicated again in Narnian history due to the prideful nature of centaurs. As the four talk, the children learn that centaurs possess both a human and horse digestive system, so they require double the sustenance— large meals (particularly breakfast) and long hours of grazing. On their journey through Narnia, they teach the Eustace and Jill about herbs and roots, planets, the nine names of Aslan, and other philosophical subjects.

In The Horse and His Boy (1954), an unnamed centaur prophesies about the baby Prince Cor one day saving the kingdom of Archenland, setting up those very events when someone kidnaps the infant to prevent this from occurring.

Centaurs do not appear in any capacity in The Magician's Nephew (1955). They are not included in the account of the Creation of Narnia by Aslan, so it is unknown at what point they came into existence. No doubt Aslan had something to do with their creation, as they are all fiercely loyal to him without exception.

In The Last Battle (1956), the centaur Roonwit is one of the last remaining loyal subjects to the throne of the Narnian king Tirian. Roonwit is the only one initially aware that the ape Shift has allied with the Calormenes and set up a false Aslan, basing this on the terrible signs he sees in the skies. Tirian tasks Roonwit with gathering those still loyal, but Roonwit is killed by Calormen archers. Farsight the eagle delivers his final message, that all worlds draw to an end and that a noble death is a most precious treasure.

=== Dragons ===
Dragons are fire-breathing reptiles with bat-like wings.

In The Voyage of the Dawn Treader (1952), Eustace Scrubb discovers the treasure horde of an old, sick dragon on one of the islands, and he watches as it collapses and dies. Eustace sleeps on the treasure and in the morning he finds that he has been transformed into a dragon himself. Aslan restores him to normal through the painful process of removing his scales.

In The Silver Chair (1953), some dragons were shown sleeping in Underland.

In The Last Battle (1956), these same dragons are awoken on the last day of Narnia and uproot Narnia's vegetation alongside the giant lizards and the salamanders, before rapidly aging and dying as Narnia ceases to exist. It is unknown if any of them entered Aslan's country.

=== Dryads ===
Dryads and other nature spirits are featured throughout the series. Dryads are spirits of the trees, and naiads are spirits of water.

During the White Witch's reign, some of the tree spirits are on her side and act as her spies while other Dryads are on Aslan's side.

When the Telmarines arrive in Narnia, magical creatures are hunted down and the dryads retreat deep within their trees, to the point that it is only Aslan who has the ability to wake them. A similar process occurs when the Calormenes invade Narnia at the end of time.

=== Dwarfs ===
Referred to as Sons of Earth by Aslan, dwarfs are broadly divided into two varieties – Red Dwarfs and Black Dwarfs. These distinctions are given due to their respective hair colors, though there are differences in their personalities as well.

- The Red Dwarfs are kind and loyal to Aslan.
- The Black Dwarfs tend to be more hostile and selfish, siding with the White Witch during her rule in the Age of Winter.

Both varieties are skilled miners, blacksmiths, and carpenters in keeping with their title "Sons of Earth." They are also deadly proficient archers. Notable individuals included Trumpkin the Red Dwarf, a skeptic who aided Caspian's resistance against the Telmarines and eventually came to truly believe in Aslan; and Nikabrik the Black Dwarf, who attempted to convince Caspian to try and resurrect the White Witch before the Pevensies arrive and intervene.

=== Fauns ===
Similar to the changes made for the centaurs, Lewis tames down the half-man half-goat fauns from their lustful, intoxicated counterparts in Greco-Roman mythology, though they are still known for enjoying spirited parties in the woods to dance with the dryads. Mr. Tumnus has the designation of being the first magical creature featured in the series in The Lion, the Witch and the Wardrobe. Tumnus was also the first character that Lewis came up with while brainstorming the series.

=== Giants ===
Giants are large human-shaped creatures that range in size from ten feet to fifty feet.

In The Lion, the Witch, and the Wardrobe (1950), some giants are on the side of Aslan while others are on the side of the White Witch. One giant named Rumblebuffin was turned to stone by the White Witch and was restored by Aslan. He later helped out the reinforcements during the First Battle of Beruna where he used his club on some of the White Witch's minions while also stepping on some of them.

In Prince Caspian (1951), a dim but well-meaning giant named Wimbleweather helped Prince Caspian in the Narnians' fight with the Telmarines.

In The Silver Chair (1953), some Narnian giants got lost trying to find Prince Rilian. The tribe of giants that live in Ettinsmoor were described as being moronic, disorganized, and speak an incomprehensible language. Further north are the giants of Harfang, who are more organized and speak a comprehensible language.

=== Marsh-wiggles ===
An original creation by Lewis, marsh-wiggles are frog-like humanoids that are known for being gloomy, cynical creatures who live in distant swamps. The most notable individual in the series was Puddleglum, who aided Eustace and Jill in their journey in The Silver Chair to save Caspian's lost son.

=== Satyrs ===
Satyrs are creatures that are half-human and half-goat, similar to fauns save for more reddish fur and longer horns.

In the 2005 film, satyrs are shown to be more bestial in appearance than fauns, covered in fur and having goat-like heads while still remaining humanoid in stature.

=== Sea serpents ===
Sea serpents and other massive aquatic monsters are rumored to inhabit the vast oceans to the east of the mainland, though most regard these tales as mere superstitions of drunk sailors and pirates. However, the crew of the Dawn Treader were notably attacked by a large sea serpent that almost destroyed the ship, confirming that much of the ocean had yet to be discovered.

=== Stars ===
Narnia has a vast array of stars arranged in different constellations than the ones found on Earth. Each of the stars are actually powerful, sentient beings created by Aslan. The exact extent of their strength and knowledge is unknown. Some stars can give up this status and take on a mortal form, such as the magician Coriakin. Others still travel to Earth and retain their abilities, such as Ramandu and his daughter. Ramandu's daughter in turn would give up her heavenly status and marry King Caspian, and the two would have a son Rilian. She was killed by the poison of the Lady of the Green Kirtle.

At the end of time, the stars return to Earth at the blow of Father Time's horn, permanently darkening the night sky.

=== Unicorns ===
Unicorns only appear a couple of times throughout the Narnia mythos. Most notably, Jewel the unicorn is one of the last remaining loyal subjects of Aslan during the events of The Last Battle, and he is King Tirian's closest friend.

In the 2005 film adaptation of The Lion, the Witch, and the Wardrobe, Peter rides a unicorn into battle before it is wounded by the White Witch's black dwarf minion Ginarrbrik.

=== Witches ===
Two prominent Witches appear in the series:

- First, Jadis the White Witch infamously took control of Narnia for one-hundred years. Jadis originally ruled as the Empress of Charn as detailed in The Magician's Nephew. Appearing as a tall, powerful woman, Mr. Beaver describes her as a descendant of Lilith, Adam's first wife who was also a Jinn. She is seen to possess superhuman strength and later comes into possession of a magic wand that can turn living things to stone. Jadis tricks Edmund Pevensie into betraying his siblings, and this betrayal leads to her presumed victory by killing Aslan, who sacrificed himself to allow Edmund to go free. However, Aslan return from the dead, citing Deep Magic, and Jadis is killed by him in the First Battle of Beruna.
- Second, the Lady of the Green Kirtle possesses the ability to shapeshift into a green serpent that kills King Caspian's wife and kidnaps his son. Artwork made for the books after Lewis' death seemed to indicate that the Green Lady and the White Witch were the same person, though nothing in Lewis' notes supports this. The Green Lady does possess powerful abilities of seduction and enchantment with various magic powders and instruments. She is eventually killed by the combined efforts of the kidnapped Prince Rilian, Eustace Scrubb, Jill Pole, and Puddleglum the Marsh-wiggle.

=== Miscellaneous ===
The following races are not in the sections above:

==== Jadis' army ====
In The Lion, the Witch, and the Wardrobe, many evil creatures with unspecified appearances are listed as members of the White Witch's army. Besides the black dwarves and some giants, Jadis' army includes:

- Boggles - in the 2005 film, Boggles are depicted as strong brown-colored goblins with pig-like noses
- Cruels - hybrid creatures with porcupine spines and the wings and beaks of birds of prey
- Efreets - powerful hybrid demons
- Ettins - a type of giant
- Ghouls - native to Calormen; in the 2005 film they are depicted with a goblin-like appearance with slit noses and long skeletal limbs.
- Hags - macabre witches; in the 2005 film (and the 2008 sequel), the hags have bird-like faces and talons
- Horrors - unspecified description
- Incubi - humanoid bat-like demons
- Minotaurs - Minotaurs have the heads of cattle and the bodies of humans. The 2005 film features a Minotaur general named Otmin. In the 2008 adaption of Prince Caspian, some Minotaurs fought on the side of Prince Caspian after settling their differences with Aslan's followers, including the elderly Asterius. One Minotaur, Tavros, serves as bosun and first mate on the Dawn Treader in the 2010 adaptation of The Voyage of the Dawn Treader.
- Nymphs of Poisonous Plants - nymphs associated with different poisonous plants.
- People of the Toadstools - one illustration depicts them as toadstools with roots for limbs.
- Ogres - humanoid creatures with monstrous teeth
- Orknies - Orc-néas are mentioned in Beowulf and are the source for the orcs of J. R. R. Tolkien's Middle-earth writings.
- Spectres - unspecified ghost-like creatures
- Sprite - evil entities with no specified description
- Werewolves - The werewolves are humanoid wolf-like creatures that are on the side of the White Witch. They don't have human forms outside of the full moon and no weakness towards silver. One werewolf was present when Nikabrik attempted to sway Caspian to resurrect the White Witch, and he is killed by Peter Pevensie when the conflict escalates. The body is described as being halfway morphed between his human and wolf forms.
- Wooses - unspecified description.
- Wraiths - unspecified ghost-like creatures

==== Other ====
Throughout the rest of the series, other minor creatures make rare appearances. These include:

- Earthmen - The Earthmen are Narnia's versions of Gnomes that live in the underground land of Bism in The Silver Chair.
- Man-Headed Bull - A Man-Headed Bull was seen as a member of Aslan's army in The Lion, the Witch, and the Wardrobe. Its appearance is similar to the Kudan.
- Merpeople - The Merfolk are a race of sea creatures that are half-human half-fish. The males are called Mermen and the females are called Mermaids.
- Monopods - The Monopods, also referred to as Dufflepuds, are dwarf-like creatures with one leg that has an enormous foot.
- Salamanders - The Salamanders are reptilian creatures who live underground beneath Narnia, appearing blindingly white-hot.
- Sea People - The Sea People are amphibious humanoids that live beneath the ocean.

== Humans ==
While not typically considered to be magical or fantastical, humans also live in Narnia, where they have differentiated to various societies:

- The Archenlanders are a race of humans descended from King Frank, the first king of Narnia who originally came from Earth in The Magician's Nephew (1955). They made their home to the south of Narnia, which would develop into the country of Archenland.
- The Calormenes are a race of dark-skinned humans that reside in the desert region south of Narnia, known as Calormen. They were notable for their worship of the deity Tash, and for their part in the days leading up to the end of Narnia.
- The Telmarines are a race of humans that descendants of a group of pirates from Earth that found their way through a portal to Narnia. They worked to extinguish magical creatures from Narnia, though one of their descendants Caspian X would reclaim the throne and establish peace.

== Talking animals ==
In The Magician's Nephew, Lewis presents the creation account for the world of Narnia by the great lion Aslan, who was the first talking animal. As one of the final stages of creation, Aslan calls forth animals from the ground, similar to the biblical story. Later, Aslan grants some of these animals the ability to speak as he does. Throughout the series, a number of these talking animals are involved in the storyline primarily as allies to Aslan and the protagonists, though some such as the ape Shift operate as antagonists. Broadly speaking, talking animals can be divided into three categories: Avian, Mammal, and Reptile.

In addition to their linguistic capacity, talking animals are larger than their non-speaking counterparts. For example, in Prince Caspian, the talking mouse Reepicheep is described as being two to three feet tall while standing on his hind legs.

Talking animals can permanently lose their ability to speak under certain circumstances. During the Telmarine occupation of Narnia, magical creatures were hunted down, and many talking animals retreated and devolved into "dumb beasts". One such bear was encountered by the Pevensie children and the red dwarf Trumpkin. During the events of The Last Battle, a talking cat named Ginger is allied with Shift and the Calormenes. In a demonstration of power, Ginger enters a stable to pretend to talk to the conglomerate god "Tashlan", not realizing that Tash himself is inside. The incident scares Ginger so badly that he flees from the stable and hysterically climbs a tree, reverting to a normal cat.

== Notable individuals ==
Powerful individuals and deities also make the land of Narnia their home.

=== Aslan ===
Aslan is a massive talking lion, described as the King of the Beasts and the Son of the Emperor-Over-the-Sea. Lewis intentionally wrote Aslan as a stand-in for Jesus as the Lion of Judah in Judeo-Christian theology.

=== Bacchus ===
Derived from the Roman god of wine, Bacchus comes to Aslan's aid to free the river god from his "chains", which was in fact the Telmarine bridge crossing the Beruna River.

=== Father Christmas ===
Locked out of Narnia for one hundred years by the White Witch, Father Christmas (derived from the folkloric character of the same name) was able to return when the four Pevensie children arrived, weakening the Witch's magic. Father Christmas gives each of the children gifts that they would need for the upcoming battle, and resumes his normal activities delivering presents for the celebration of Christmas.

=== Father Time ===
A massive, sleeping giant derived from the folkloric personification of time, Father Time is awoken by Aslan to assist in the destruction of Narnia at the end of time. Father Time destroys Narnia's sun and alerts the stars to return to Earth.

=== Tash ===
The primary god of the Calormene people, Tash borrows heavily from Islamic traditions and customs. In The Horse and His Boy, Tash worship is first introduced. In The Last Battle, it is revealed that Tash is a real demonic being with a skeletal body and bird-like head. He kills Shift, who had attempted to combine Aslan and Tash into one deity to control the Narnian public while himself believing in neither.
