= Seven Great Lords of Narnia =

Fictional literary characters

The Seven Great Lords of Narnia are fictional characters from The Chronicles of Narnia by C. S. Lewis. They are briefly mentioned in Prince Caspian and are central to the plot in The Voyage of the Dawn Treader, the second and third published books, respectively, in the series.

In the book Prince Caspian, Caspian overthrows Miraz, with the help of the Old Narnians, to take his rightful position as King of Narnia. In The Voyage of the Dawn Treader he sets sail for the Lone Islands and beyond to look for the seven lords who had been sent to explore the lands beyond the Eastern Ocean.

== Miraz and the Lords of Narnia ==
"And then, one by one, all the great lords who had known your father, died or disappeared. Not by accident, either. Miraz weeded them out. Belisar and Uvilas were shot with arrows on a hunting party: by chance, it was pretended. All the great house of the Passarids he sent to fight giants on the Northern frontier till one by one they fell. Arlian and Erimon and a dozen more he executed for treason on a false charge. The two brothers of Beaversdam he shut up as madmen. And finally he persuaded the seven noble lords, who alone among all the Telmarines did not fear the sea, to sail away and look for new lands beyond the Eastern Ocean, and, as he intended, they never came back."

The above is a quote by Doctor Cornelius in the novel Prince Caspian.

== The seven noble Lords ==
=== Lord Bern ===
Bern was the first lord to be found by the crew of the Dawn Treader, when they landed on Felimath, one of the Lone Islands. Caspian X, Lucy, Edmund, Eustace, and Reepicheep went ashore on Felimath and were taken prisoner by slavers. Caspian was bought as a slave by Lord Bern. He spotted him along with the others being led across the islands by the slave traders who have just captured them. He revealed his true identity to Caspian and Bern promised to treat him well. Bern told Caspian that he bought him because he reminded him of his former master, King Caspian IX. Bern told Caspian that he arrived at the Lone Islands, married a girl there, and decided to stay. Caspian then reveals that he was his former master's son. Bern then introduces himself as Lord Bern and joins forces with Caspian and his crew to save the others (Lucy, Edmund, Eustace, and Reepicheep) from the slave traders.

When Caspian learns that the island's government has become corrupt (not least by legalising slave trade), he uses his official standing as Emperor of the Lone Islands to appoint Lord Bern as Duke of the Lone Islands, ousting Governor Gumpus and dismissing his followers. Caspian also announces that slavery is illegal in Narnia and declares all slaves free. Lord Bern remains on Doorn, in the city Narrowhaven (Voyage of the Dawn Treader, chp. 4) when the crew set sail again, now in a position (Duke of the Lone Islands) to restore order to the islands.

Bern is the only lord who engages in any warlike activity and, according to the Oxford English Dictionary, "berne" is a sixteenth-century word meaning "warrior". However, the rest of the lords do not seem to have etymologically resonant names.

=== Lord Octesian ===
A bracelet bearing Octesian's family crest was found on Dragon Island, where the Dawn Treader stopped for repairs after being caught in a storm.

His true fate is never revealed, but there are two theories about what happened to Lord Octesian when he was on Dragon Island - he either was eaten by a dragon who was already there, or else was himself turned into a dragon.

In the film version, Edmund, Caspian and Eustace find his skeletal remains wrapped around various gold and jewellery, implying that he was either killed by another dragon who was already there or had been starved to death after being tempted to stay on the island for its treasures despite the harsh conditions.

=== Lord Restimar ===
Restimar's corpse, in the form of a gold statue, was found on Deathwater Island, an island also known as Goldwater Island for a time, where he had dived into a lake, not realizing that it turned everything in its waters to solid gold. He was discovered by Reepicheep when Edmund found Restimar's armour. Caspian later identified the solid gold body as Restimar's when Coriakin informed them that he had been the only one missing from the party when the remaining four lords arrived on Duffer Island.

In the film version, Caspian, Edmund, and Lucy find his corpse instead; Reepicheep doesn't accompany them.

=== Lord Rhoop ===
Rhoop was found on the Dark Island, which was also known as "the island where dreams come true." In this place, people re-experience terrible nightmares that they've had. He went to the island thinking that dreams meant daydreams, and found himself trapped in nightmares for seven years. He is a broken man by the time he is rescued, so when the voyage sets anchor at Ramandu's Island the crew leave Rhoop behind to enjoy a blissful, enchanted "sleep without dreams". He remains in this sleep until one of the members of Caspian's crew, Reepicheep, sails into the land of Aslan and he wakes up at the same time as the three other lords who were in a deep sleep there. It is not stated if he ever recovers from his ordeal. He is in fact the only Lord that witnessed the Dark Island.

In the film version, he is the last lord to be discovered. His fate is left unknown in the end.

=== Lords Mavramorn, Revilian and Argoz ===
These three lords are found on the Island of Ramandu, and are the last to be discovered. Their hair has grown exceptionally long when Caspian and his followers find them; and they are in a deep sleep from which the travellers are unable to wake them.

Ramandu's daughter then appears and tells the travellers that seven years earlier, the three lords quarrelled over whether to remain at the island, to sail onwards, or to return to Narnia, and that one of the lords, in his anger, picked up the knife which the White Witch had used centuries before to kill Aslan (who was quickly thereafter resurrected). This inappropriate handling of a sacred object caused the three lords to fall into an enchanted sleep in which they had remained for seven years.

Caspian and his friends are told that the only way to awaken the three sleeping lords is to sail voluntarily to the end of the world or as close as possible, and to leave behind at least one member of the crew. After the Dawn Treader has sailed east for some time in this quest, Aslan appears to Caspian, and informs him that Reepicheep, Edmund, Lucy, and Eustace are to continue on towards the end of the world, but that the other crew members are to go back.

This requirement is fulfilled, and Reepicheep goes on towards the end of the world, as he has always wished, and the three children return to England. Caspian marries Ramandu's daughter and the three lords awaken from their sleep, whereupon they are greeted by Lord Rhoop.

In the film version, they are the second to last lords to be discovered, with Lord Rhoop being the last instead. Unlike the book, they awoke after the Dark Island was destroyed and do not meet Rhoop.

== Analysis ==
Narnian lords can represent the Seven Deadly Sins and each of them falls victim to a particular vice that prevents him from completing his quest to "explore the unknown Eastern Seas beyond the Lone Islands".

== Portrayals ==
=== 1989 BBC adaptation ===
- Lord Bern - Pavel Douglas
- Lord Rhoop - Christopher Godwin

=== BBC Radio 4 ===
- Lord Bern - John Turner
- Lord Rhoop - Andrew Branch

=== Focus on the Family Radio Theatre ===
- Lord Bern and Lord Mavramorn - Michael Haughey
- Lord Revilian - Peter Goodwright
- Lord Argoz - David Oakley
- Lord Rhoop - Simon Treves

=== 2010 film ===
- Lord Bern - Terry Norris
- Lord Rhoop - Bruce Spence
