= List of accolades received by The Chronicles of Narnia film series =

List of awards won by The Chronicles of Narnia film series
- Official logo
Awards and nominations
Award	Won	Nominated
Academy Awards	1	3
Academy of Science Fiction, Fantasy & Horror Films, USA	2	16
Annie Awards	0	1
Australian Film Institute	0	2
BAFTA Awards	1	2
BMI Film & TV Awards	1	0
Broadcast Film Critics Association Awards	1	1
Character and Morality in Entertainment Awards	1	0
Chicago Film Critics Association Awards	0	1
Costume Designers Guild Awards	1	1
Empire Awards	0	3
Golden Globe Award	0	3
Grammy Awards	0	2
Hugo Awards	0	1
Humanitas Prize	0	1
- Total number of wins and nominations
Totals	8	33
- Footnotes

The Chronicles of Narnia is a series of English fantasy films from Walden Media that are based on The Chronicles of Narnia, a series of novels written by C. S. Lewis. A planned heptalogy, the series currently consists of three films—The Lion, the Witch and the Wardrobe (2005), Prince Caspian (2008), and The Voyage of the Dawn Treader (2010). The next film will be an adaptation of The Magician's Nephew.

The series revolves around the adventures of children in the fictional world of Narnia, guided by Aslan, a talking lion and the true king of Narnia. Most of the children featured were the Pevensie siblings and the prominent antagonist featured was the White Witch. While the films follow the novels' traditional storyline and Christian themes, they also added deviations from the source material, including the Greek Mythology and Irish fairy tales.

The first two films were directed by Andrew Adamson, produced by Mark Johnson, and distributed by Walt Disney Pictures. The third film is the first of the chronicles to be released in Digital 3D. It was directed by Michael Apted and distributed by 20th Century Fox.

The series is considered to be one of the biggest movie franchises around the world due to the legacy of the novels. The first film was a financial success by being the 52nd highest-grossing film of all-time. The series has now grossed over $1.5 billion making it the 25th highest-grossing film series of all time.

== The Lion, the Witch and the Wardrobe ==
The Lion, the Witch and the Wardrobe won several awards including the Academy Award for Makeup; the BeliefNet Film Award for Best Spiritual film; the Movieguide Faith & Values Awards: Most Inspiring Movie of 2005 and Best Family Movie of 2005; and the CAMIE (Character and Morality In Entertainment) Award. Others include the British Academy Film Awards for Makeup and Hair and Orange Rising Star (James McAvoy); Outstanding Motion Picture, Animated or Mixed Media; the Phoenix Film Critics Society Award for Best Performance by a Youth in a Lead or Supporting Role (Georgie Henley, Female); the Costume Designers Guild Award for Excellence in Fantasy Film (Isis Mussenden); and the Saturn Award for Costumes (Isis Mussenden) and Make-up (Howard Berger, Greg Nicotero, and Nikki Gooley).

Georgie Henley, in her performance as Lucy Pevensie earned critical acclaim for her performance. She won several awards, including the Phoenix Film Critics Society award for Best Actress in a Leading Role and Best Performance by a Youth. She also won another awards either for Best Young Performance or Best Actress in a Leading Role.

The film was nominated for AFI's Top 10 Fantasy Films list.

=== Awards ===
Year	Award	Category/Recipient	Result	Reference
2005	Phoenix Film Critics Society Awards	Best Performance by a Youth in a Lead or Supporting Role - Female (Georgie Henley)	Won	
2005	Satellite Awards	Outstanding Motion Picture, Animated or Mixed Media	Won	
2006	Satellite Awards	Best DVD Extras	Nominated	
2006	78th Academy Awards	Best Makeup (Howard Berger) (Tami Lane)	Won	
2006	78th Academy Awards	Best Sound Mixing; Terry Porter (Dean A. Zupancic) (Tony Johnson)	Nominated	
2006	78th Academy Awards	Best Visual Effects	Nominated	
2006	Annie Awards	Best Character Animation; Matt Shumway	Nominated	
2006	Australian Film Institute	Excellence in Filmmaking (Roger Ford) (Production design)	Nominated	
2006	Australian Film Institute	Excellence in Filmmaking (Donald McAlpine) (Cinematography)	Nominated	
2006	59th BAFTA Awards	Best Makeup and Hair; Howard Berger; Greg Nicotero; Nikki Gooley	Won	
2006	59th BAFTA Awards	Best Costume Design; Isis Mussenden	Nominated	
2006	59th BAFTA Awards	Best Special Visual Effects; Dean Wright; Bill Westenhofer; Jim Berney; Scott Farrar	Nominated	
2006	Broadcast Film Critics Association Awards	Best Family Film (Live Action)	Won	
2006	Broadcast Film Critics Association Awards	Best Young Actress; Georgie Henley	Nominated	
2006	CAMIE Awards	(no name for this award was given); Charlie Nelson (Walt Disney Pictures); Brigham Taylor (Disney vice-president productions); Mark Johnson (producer); Philip Steuer (producer); Douglas Gresham (co-producer); Andrew Adamson (director); Ann Peacock (screenwriter); Christopher Markus (screenwriter); Stephen McFeely (screenwriter); Georgie Henley (actor); William Moseley (actor); Skandar Keynes (actor); Anna Popplewell (actor) (Walden Media)	Won	
2006	CFCA Awards	Most Promising Performer; Georgie Henley	Nominated	
2006	Costume Designers Guild Awards	Fantasy Film; Isis Mussenden	Won	
2006	11th Empire Awards	Best Newcomer; Georgie Henley	Nominated	
2006	11th Empire Awards	Best Newcomer; James McAvoy	Nominated	
2006	11th Empire Awards	Best Sci-Fi / Fantasy	Nominated	
2006	63rd Golden Globe Awards	Golden Globe Award for Best Original Score; Harry Gregson-Williams	Nominated	
2006	63rd Golden Globe Awards	Golden Globe Award for Best Original Song; Alanis Morissette "Wunderkind"	Nominated	
2006	Hugo Awards	Hugo Award for Best Dramatic Presentation	Nominated	
2006	Humanitas Prize	Feature Film Category; Ann Peacock; Andrew Adamson; Christopher Markus; Stephen McFeely	Nominated	
2006	London Film Critics Circle Awards 2005	British Supporting Actor of the Year (James McAvoy)	Nominated	
2006	London Film Critics Circle Awards 2005	British Supporting Actress of the Year (Tilda Swinton)	Nominated	
2006	MTV Movie Awards	MTV Movie Award for Best Villain (Tilda Swinton)	Nominated	
2006	Motion Picture Sound Editors	Best Sound Editing in Feature Film - Dialogue and Automated Dialogue Replacement; George Watters II (supervising sound editor); Kimberly Harris (supervising adr editor); Richard Beggs (sound designer); David Bach (supervising dialogue editor); David V. Butler (dialogue editor); Laura Graham (adr editor); Michele Perrone (adr editor)	Nominated	
2006	Motion Picture Sound Editors	Best Sound Editing in Feature Film - Sound Effects & Foley; Richard Beggs (supervising sound editor); George Watters II (supervising sound editor); Victoria Martin (supervising Foley editor); F. Hudson Miller (sound editor); R.J. Palmer (sound editor); John Morris (sound editor); Suhail Kafity (sound editor); Chuck Michael (sound editor); Todd Toon (sound editor); Gary Wright (sound editor); Heather Gross (sound editor); Matthew Harrison (Foley editor); James Likowski (Foley editor); Dan O'Connell (Foley artist); John T. Cucci (Foley artist)	Nominated	
2006	Movieguide Awards	Best Film for Families	Won	
2006	Movieguide Awards	Epiphany Prize	Won	
2006	Online Film Critics Society Awards	Best Breakthrough Performance(Georgie Henley)	Nominated	
2006	32nd Saturn Awards	Best Fantasy Film	Nominated	
2006	32nd Saturn Awards	Best Director	Nominated	
2006	32nd Saturn Awards	Best Screenplay	Nominated	
2006	32nd Saturn Awards	Best Actress (Tilda Swinton)	Nominated	
2006	32nd Saturn Awards	Best Younger Actor/Actress (William Moseley)	Nominated	
2006	32nd Saturn Awards	Best Costume	Won	
2006	32nd Saturn Awards	Best Make-Up	Won	
2006	32nd Saturn Awards	Best Visual Effects	Nominated	
2006	Visual Effects Society	Outstanding Animated Character in a Live Action Motion Picture Richard Baneham; Erik-Jan de Boer; Matt Logue; Joe Ksander; For "Aslan"	Nominated	
2006	Visual Effects Society	Outstanding Visual Effects in a Visual Effects Driven Motion Picture; Dean Wright; Randy Starr; Bill Westenhofer; Jim Berney	Nominated	
2006	World Soundtrack Awards	Best Original Song Written Directly for a Film; Harry Gregson-Williams (music); Imogen Heap (music/lyrics/performer); For the song "Can't Take It In"	Nominated	
2006	27th Young Artist Awards	Best Family Feature Film - Drama	Won	
2006	27th Young Artist Awards	Best Performance in a Feature Film - Young Actress Age Ten or Younger Georgie Henley	Won	
2006	27th Young Artist Awards	Best Performance in a Feature Film (Comedy or Drama) - Leading Young Actor William Moseley	Nominated	
2007	Academy of Science Fiction, Fantasy & Horror Films, USA	Best DVD Special Edition Release; For the "Extended Edition"	Nominated	
2007	49th Grammy Awards	Grammy Award for Best Score Soundtrack Album for a Motion Picture, Television or Other Visual Media (Harry Gregson-Williams)	Nominated	
2007	49th Grammy Awards	Grammy Award for Best Song Written for a Motion Picture, Television or Other Visual Media (Imogen Heap) For the song "Can't Take It In"	Nominated	

== Prince Caspian ==
=== Awards ===
Year	Award	Category/Recipient	Result	Reference
2008	MTV Movie Awards	Best Summer Movie So Far	Nominated	
2008	Teen Choice Awards	Choice Movie: Action Adventure	Won	
2008	Teen Choice Awards	Choice Movie Breakout Male (Ben Barnes)	Nominated	
2008	National Movie Awards	Best Family Film	Nominated	
2008	National Movie Awards	Best Performance – Male (Ben Barnes)	Nominated	
2009	People's Choice Awards	Favorite Family Movie	Nominated	
2009	Costume Designers Guild Awards	Excellence in Costume Design for Film – Fantasy	Nominated	
2009	Golden Reel Awards	Best Sound Editing – Sound Effects, Foley, Dialogue and ADR in a Foreign Feature Film	Nominated	
2009	Visual Effects Society Awards	Outstanding Visual Effects in a Visual Effects Driven Motion Picture	Nominated	
2009	Visual Effects Society Awards	Outstanding Compositing in a Feature Motion Picture	Nominated	
2009	Young Artist Award	Best Performance in a Feature Film – Young Ensemble Cast (Georgie Henley, Skandar Keynes, William Moseley, Anna Popplewell)	Nominated	
2009	Young Artist Award	Best Performance in a Feature Film – Leading Young Actress (Georgie Henley)	Nominated	
2009	Young Artist Award	Best Performance in a Feature Film – Leading Young Actor (Skandar Keynes)	Nominated	
2009	Taurus World Stunt Awards	Best Fight	Nominated	
2009	BMI Film & TV Awards	BMI Film Music Award	Won	
2009	MTV Movie Awards	Breakthrough Male Performance (Ben Barnes)	Nominated	
2009	Saturn Award	Best Fantasy Film	Nominated	
2009	Saturn Award	Best Costume	Nominated	
2009	Saturn Award	Best Make-Up	Nominated	
2009	Saturn Award	Best Visual Effects	Nominated	

== The Voyage of the Dawn Treader ==
On December 14, 2010, The Hollywood Foreign Press Association nominated The Voyage of the Dawn Treader for the Golden Globe Award for Best Original Song ("There's a Place for Us") at the 68th Golden Globe Awards. It received three nominations at the Phoenix Film Critics Society Awards: Best Youth Actor (Will Poulter), Best Live Action Family Film, and Best Original Song. Poulter received a nomination for Young British Performer of the Year at the 2010 London Film Critics Circle Awards. The film also received four nominations at the 37th Saturn Awards. It was awarded the Epiphany Prize as the Most Inspiring Movie of 2010.

=== Awards ===
Year	Award	Category/Recipient(s)	Result	Reference
2010	Phoenix Film Critics Society Awards	Best Family Film	Nominated	
2010	Phoenix Film Critics Society Awards	Best Youth Actor (Will Poulter)	Nominated	
2010	Phoenix Film Critics Society Awards	Best Original Song ("There's a Place for Us")	Nominated	
2010	2010 London Film Critics Circle Awards	Young Performer of the Year (Will Poulter)	Nominated	
2010	2010 Art Directors Guild Awards	Excellence in Production Design for a Fantasy Feature Film	Nominated	
2011	68th Golden Globe Awards	Best Original Song ("There's a Place for Us")	Nominated	
2011	9th Annual Visual Effects Society Awards	Outstanding Animated Character in a Live Action Feature Motion Picture (Reepicheep)	Nominated	
2011	People's Choice Awards	Favorite 3D Live Action Movie	Won	
2011	2011 London Critics Circle Film Awards	Young British Performer of the Year (Will Poulter)	Nominated	
2011	32nd Young Artist Awards	Best Performance in a Feature Film - Young Ensemble Cast (Georgie Henley, Skander Keynes, Will Poulter)	Nominated	
2011	19th MovieGuide Faith and Values Awards	Most Inspiring Movie	Won	
2011	Crystal Dove Seal Award	Best Adventure	Won	
2011	37th Saturn Awards	Best Fantasy Film	Nominated	
2011	37th Saturn Awards	Best Performance by a Younger Actor (Will Poulter)	Nominated	
2011	37th Saturn Awards	Best Costume	Nominated	
2011	37th Saturn Awards	Best Special Effects	Nominated	
2011	National Movie Awards	Fantasy	Nominated	
2011	National Movie Awards	Performance of the Year (Ben Barnes)	Nominated	
2011	National Movie Awards	Performance of the Year (Georgie Henley)	Nominated	
