= Shane Rangi =

New Zealand actor

- Born: New Zealand
- Occupation: Actor

Shane Rangi is a New Zealand actor. He affiliates to the Ngāti Porou iwi (tribe).

Rangi has played many characters in the Chronicles of Narnia film series. In The Lion, The Witch and the Wardrobe he played General Otmin, general of the White Witch's army, and the centaur that blows a horn as the Pevensie children enter Aslan's camp. In Prince Caspian, he played the werewolf, Asterius the Minotaur, the Wild Bear and the Physical Aslan. In the movie Voyager of the Dawn Treader he plays Tavros the Minotaur.

In the final film of the Lord of the Rings trilogy, he plays a Mumak Mahud, a Haradrim leader who is seen riding an oliphaunt against the Rohirrim during the Battle of the Pelennor Fields.

Shane also appears in the miniseries Spartacus: Gods of the Arena as Dagan – a gladiatorial Syrian recruit.

== Filmography ==
=== Film ===
Year	Title	Role	Notes
2001	The Lord of the Rings: The Fellowship of the Ring	Witch-king	Uncredited
2002	The Lord of the Rings: The Two Towers	Easterling/Witch-king/Uruk-Hai	Uncredited
2003	The Lord of the Rings: The Return of the King	Harad Leader 2	
2005	King Kong	Native	Uncredited
2005	The Chronicles of Narnia: The Lion, the Witch and the Wardrobe	General Otmin	
2008	The Chronicles of Narnia: Prince Caspian	Asterius / Wer-Wolf	
2009	Avatar	Amp Suit	Uncredited
2010	The Chronicles of Narnia: The Voyage of the Dawn Treader	Tavros	
2014	The Dark Horse	Police Officer #1	
2014	The Hobbit: The Battle of the Five Armies	Laketown Refugee	Uncredited
2016	Chronesthesia	Mysterious Man	
2018	Pacific Rim Uprising	Sonny's Crew #1	
2018	Mortal Engines	Burly Salvageman	
2022	Avatar: The Way of Water	Matador Co-Pilot	

=== Television ===
Year	Title	Role	Notes
2011	Spartacus: Gods of the Arena	Dagan	6 episodes
2015	Thomas & Friends		animation

=== Stunts ===
Year	Title	Role	Notes
2001	The Lord of the Rings: The Fellowship of the Ring		
2002	The Lord of the Rings: The Two Towers		
2003	The Lord of the Rings: The Return of the King		
