= Laura Brent =

Australian actress (born 1988)

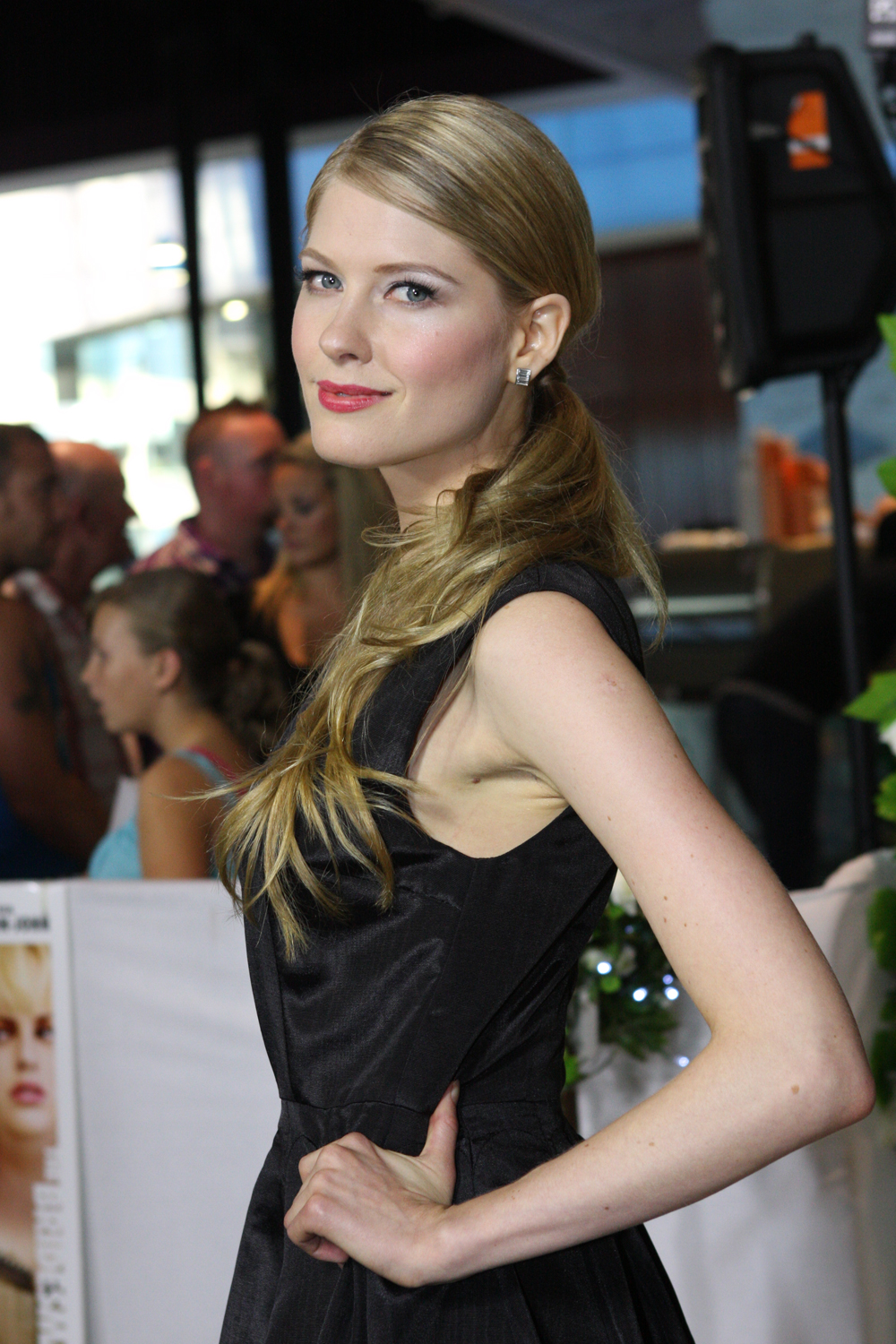
- Laura Brent at A Few Best Men's premiere in Sydney, Australia, in January 2012
- Born: 2 May 1988 (age 37); Melbourne, Victoria, Australia
- Occupation: Actress
- Years active: 2007–present

Laura Brent (born 2 May 1988) is an Australian actress, best known for her role as Lilliandil in The Chronicles of Narnia: The Voyage of the Dawn Treader.

== Biography ==
Born in Melbourne, Brent attended the National Institute of Dramatic Art, where she trained as an actress and a singer and graduated in 2007. She made her first screen appearance in the 2009 short film Message from the CEO and went on to making guest appearances on the Australian television series Chandon Pictures, Legend of the Seeker, and Rescue: Special Ops. In 2010, she rose to international fame when she made her feature film debut as Lilliandil in the third installment of The Chronicles of Narnia film series, The Voyage of the Dawn Treader.

In the Mortal Kombat reboot, she played role of Allison Young, the wife of the film's protagonist Cole Young.

== Filmography ==
=== Film ===
Year	Title	Role	Notes
2010	The Chronicles of Narnia: The Voyage of the Dawn Treader	Lilliandil	
2011	Burning Man	Nurse #3	
2011	A Few Best Men	Mia Ramme	
2012	Not Suitable for Children	Erica	
2014	Healing	Stacey	
2018	Winchester	Ruby	
2021	Mortal Kombat	Allison Young	

=== Television ===
Year	Title	Role	Notes
2009	Chandon Pictures	Sarah	4 episodes
2010	Legend of the Seeker	Dahlia	3 episodes
2010	Rescue: Special Ops	Katrina Whitney	1 episode
2011	Wild Boys	Charlotte Kenealty	2 episodes
2014	ANZAC Girls	Sister Elsie Cook	6 episodes
2016	Transylvania	Victoria	Pilot

=== Short film ===
Year	Title	Role
2009	Message from the CEO	Girlfriend
2012	Anima	Joselyn Murphy
