= Richard Henders =

British actor

Richard Henders is a British actor.

He is best known for his portrayal of Prince Rilian in the 1990 BBC adaptation of The Silver Chair. He has also appeared in dramas such as Can You Hear Me Thinking?, Pie in the Sky, Foyle's War and The Inspector Lynley Mysteries. In 2004, Henders received an Olivier Award nomination for his performance in Pacific Overtures at London's Donmar Warehouse. He also played the role of Merry in the 2007 musical production of The Lord of the Rings at the Theatre Royal, Drury Lane. Henders currently lives in London.
