= Coriakin =

Fictional character in Narnia

- Narnia character
- Bille Brown as Coriakin in the 2010 film The Chronicles of Narnia: The Voyage of the Dawn Treader

In-universe information
- Race: Star
- Nationality: Island of the Monopods

Coriakin is a fictional character in C. S. Lewis's Chronicles of Narnia. He appears in The Voyage of the Dawn Treader.

== Fictional character biography ==
Coriakin was originally a star, who, as reparation for past misdeeds was charged by Aslan to rule the Duffers and guide them to wisdom. The nature of Coriakin's misdeeds is not specified. In response to Prince Caspian's question about them, Ramandu, a fellow star, replies that "it is not for you, a son of Adam, to know what faults a star can commit."

Coriakin appears as a wizard, barefoot in a red robe with a crown of oak leaves. He lives on an island in a large house reminiscent of an English mansion. He keeps a spellbook in a room on the top floor, and owns various other odd items, such as a Bearded Glass. Ford mentions possible allusions to the Druids and Melchizedek, but concludes that Lewis's intent and symbolism in Coriakin is far from clear.

Coriakin rules the Duffers through magic, although he hopes they will be ruled eventually by wisdom. Because of the dim-witted stubbornness of his subjects, Coriakin casts a spell that merges their legs into a single leg each, transforming them into Monopods. The Duffers, believing themselves to have been "uglified," sneak into his rooms and cast a spell to make themselves invisible, hiding their new appearance. The spell also affects Coriakin, and invisibility makes him sleepy, so that he misses the arrival of the Dawn Treader and its party. Tired of being invisible, the Duffers coerce Lucy Pevensie into reading the spell that makes them visible again (the spell could only be read by a young girl, and the Duffers were too cowardly to send any of their own daughters). After perusing a few other distracting spells, Lucy makes all things in the magician's house visible, including Coriakin and Aslan himself.

Lucy soon sees the magician as a kind, wise fellow with a good sense of humor, hardly the terrifying sorcerer the Duffers made him out to be. He welcomes Aslan graciously and submits willingly to the long penance of bringing the Duffers to wisdom. Although he treats his guests to a magnificent feast, he himself takes only bread and wine. He suggests that Lucy try to convince the Duffers that their new appearance is nicer than their former one, which she succeeds in doing (they also find advantages in their new condition, such as using their giant foot as a boat or as a sun umbrella). The dwarfs rename themselves Monopods, but keep mixing it up with their old name and come to be known as Dufflepuds.

The relationship between Coriakin and Dufflepuds is usually seen as a metaphor for the relationship between God and humanity: namely, the Dufflepuds see Coriakin as "the oppressor" because he tells them to do work in his garden that is eventually for their own good, and believe that they can fool him. The story of their transformation into Monopods was likely self-deprecating on the part of the author: Lewis was born with only one joint in his thumbs, which impeded his physical activities and resulted in him becoming a writer. Therefore his handicap led him to discover his purpose in life, the same way as Duffers eventually found advantage in their new form as Monopods.

Dufflepuds ("Monopods") are among the creatures that face judgement at Aslan's doorway in The Last Battle.

== Portrayals ==
- In the 1989 television serial produced by the BBC, The Voyage of the Dawn Treader, Coriakin is played by veteran British actor Preston Lockwood (1912–1996).
- In the 2010 Fox/Walden film, he is portrayed by Bille Brown, who died just over two years after the film's release.
- Coriakin was voiced by Norman Bowler in the 2001 Focus on the Family Radio Theatre adaptation.
- In 1995, John Hartley voiced the character in the BBC Radio 4 radio play.
