= Music of The Chronicles of Narnia film series =

The music of the Chronicles of Narnia film series was recorded and released in conjunction with the post-production and releases of each of the three corresponding films.

== Soundtracks ==
1. The Chronicles of Narnia: The Lion, the Witch and the Wardrobe (2005) composed by Harry Gregson-Williams.
2. The Chronicles of Narnia: Prince Caspian (2008) composed by Harry Gregson-Williams.
3. The Chronicles of Narnia: The Voyage of the Dawn Treader (2010) composed by David Arnold.

== Other albums ==
1. Music Inspired by The Chronicles of Narnia: The Lion, the Witch and the Wardrobe (2005) collection of songs by various Christian artists that were inspired by the film The Chronicles of Narnia: The Lion, the Witch and the Wardrobe.

== Songs ==
- "Waiting for the World to Fall" performed and written by Jars of Clay; produced by Jars of Clay and Mitch Dane.
- "Wunderkind" performed by Alanis Morissette; written by Alanis Morissette and Harry Gregson-Williams; produced by Mike Elizondo.
- "This Is Home" performed and produced by Switchfoot; written by Jon Foreman, Adam Watts, and Andy Dodd.
- "There's a Place for Us" performed by Carrie Underwood; written by Carrie Underwood, David Hodges, and Hillary Lindsey; produced by Mark Bright.
- "The Call" performed by Regina Spektor.

== Notable people ==
=== Composers ===
- Harry Gregson-Williams
- David Arnold

=== Performers ===
- Jars of Clay
- Steven Curtis Chapman
- Jeremy Camp
- Bethany Dillon
- Delirious?
- Rebecca St. James
- tobyMac
- Nichole Nordeman
- David Crowder Band
- Kutless
- Imogen Heap
- Alanis Morissette
- Tim Finn
- Lisbeth Scott
- Regina Spektor
- Oren Lavie
- Switchfoot
- Hanne Hukkelberg
- Carrie Underwood
- Joe McElderry
- E.M.D.
- Stan Walker
- Sonohra
