= Telmarines =

Fictional people in the Chronicles of Narnia

Narnia under Telmarine Monarchy
- The Chronicles of Narnia location
- Flag of Narnia under Telmarine monarchy

- Coat of arms of Narnia under Telmarine monarchy Based on illustration by Pauline Baynes
- Created by: C. S. Lewis
- Genre: Children's fantasy

In-universe information
- Type: Monarchy
- Races: Telmarines (Talking animals, Dwarfs, Giants, Fauns, Centaurs, Nymphs, etc. were outlaws and claimed by the monarchy not to exist)
- Locations: Miraz's Castle (capital), Cair Paravel (former capital)
- Characters: Miraz, Prunaprismia, Lord Glozelle, Lord Sopespian
- Language(s): English

The Telmarines are a people in the fictional world of Narnia created by the British author C. S. Lewis for his series The Chronicles of Narnia. Hailing from Telmar, the Telmarines are prominent in the book Prince Caspian, the second book published in the series (but numbered volume 4 in recent editions ordered chronologically). The Telmarines were pirates in Earth before entering the Narnian world through a magical cave.

No scene from the books takes place there, but Telmar is said to be "far beyond the Western Mountains." According to the timeline drawn up by Lewis, Calormen extended west into Telmar some three centuries after the world was first created. However, after only two years, the Calormenes in Telmar behaved so wickedly that Aslan turned them into dumb beasts, and the area became effectively unpopulated. Pirates from our world arrived in Telmar over a century later, through a rare gateway between the worlds. Prince Caspian describes how the descendants of these pirates, the Telmarines, invaded Narnia many generations later, leaving Telmar behind and suppressing Narnia's native inhabitants. This led eventually to the events related in Prince Caspian.

Telmarine leaders of Narnia in Prince Caspian are King Miraz (brother of the late Caspian IX), Queen Prunaprismia, Lord Glozelle, and Lord Sopespian. In the film version of Prince Caspian, the principal Telmarine characters are portrayed by Spanish, Latin American, and Italian actors.

The high-ranking Telmarines are shown to be corrupt, scheming individuals. Miraz had his own brother killed in order to claim the throne. Sopespian and Glozelle plot together to kill Miraz and blame it on the Narnians in order to declare all-out war on them. This plan succeeds, although the Telmarine army is defeated in the subsequent battle, ending some 300 years of oppression (according to the timeline).

== Family tree ==
This is the family tree of Telmarine monarchs of Narnia.

Caspian I (the Conqueror)
six generations
Caspian VIII
Ramandu	Caspian IX	Miraz	Prunaprismia
Ramandu's Daughter	Caspian X	unnamed son
Rilian
five generations
Erlian
Tirian
