= Ramandu's daughter =

Fictional character in Narnia

- Narnia character
- Laura Brent as Lilliandil in the 2010 film The Chronicles of Narnia: The Voyage of the Dawn Treader.

In-universe information
- Race: Half-Star
- Title: Queen of Narnia
- Family: Ramandu
- Spouse: Caspian X
- Children: Rilian
- Nationality: Ramandu's Island, Narnia

Ramandu's daughter, (Note: The character does not have a name in the novels, and is referenced as Ramandu's daughter, the Lady, Caspian's Queen, the Queen, and Rilian's mother. She is also known as the Star's daughter and the Daughter of Ramandu.) also known as Lilliandil in the 2010 film version of The Voyage of the Dawn Treader, is a fictional character from The Chronicles of Narnia by C. S. Lewis. Introduced in the 1952 book The Voyage of the Dawn Treader, she aids Caspian X and the crew of Dawn Treader to break an enchantment on three of the Seven Great Lords of Narnia. Eventually she becomes Queen of Narnia, after marrying Caspian X, and bears his son, Rilian. In the 1953 novel The Silver Chair, the Lady of the Green Kirtle, in the form of a snake, kills her though she later reappears in the 1956 book The Last Battle. The character appears in adaptations of the book series; the television serial The Chronicles of Narnia, where she is portrayed by Gabrielle Anwar, and The Chronicles of Narnia film series, where Laura Brent plays the role.

According to Lewis scholar Paul F. Ford, Lewis created the character of Ramandu's daughter having been inspired by J. R. R. Tolkien's Middle Earth elves, specifically Lúthien and Arwen. Ramandu's daughter has also been compared to the angelic entities known as Maiar, also featured in Tolkien's novels. Douglas Gresham, Lewis' step-son, created the name Lilliandil for the 2010 film version of The Voyage of the Dawn Treader. Ramandu's daughter was the subject of literary analysis by various scholars, with her goodness and her marriage with Caspian X receiving attention. The character has been associated with various Christian virtues and women in the Bible.

== Role ==
=== Literature ===
"The figure carried a light, and the light was really all that they could see distinctly. It came slowly nearer and nearer till at last it stood right at the table opposite to them. Now they could see that it was a tall girl, dressed in a single long garment of clear blue which left her arms bare. She was bareheaded and her yellow hair hung down her back. And when they looked at her they thought they had never before known what beauty meant."

— The first description of Ramandu's daughter in The Voyage of the Dawn Treader

Ramandu's daughter is introduced in C. S. Lewis's 1952 book The Voyage of the Dawn Treader. In the novel, siblings Edmund and Lucy Pevensie and their cousin Eustace Scrubb are transported to the fantasy world Narnia through a painting of a boat; they help Caspian X, the king of Narnia, sail to the edge of the world on the ship Dawn Treader in order to find the Seven Great Lords of Narnia. As part of their journey, they travel to Ramandu's Island, which is home to the "star at rest" Ramandu, and are greeted by his daughter. Lewis only references the character through titles, never by her name. Portrayed as a young and beautiful immortal woman with long blonde hair, she is first shown wearing a blue gown and holding a lit candle. The character provides hope to Caspian X and his companions, who had discovered that the Lords Mavramorn, Revilian and Argoz were cursed by a sleeping enchantment.

Caspian X talks about the fairy tale "Sleeping Beauty" with Ramandu's daughter and suggests kissing her to reverse the curse on the lords. She tells him that she will only kiss him once the enchantment is broken, and proposes to him. Caspian X makes a promise to her before departing that he will break the curse. He returns to Ramandu's Island three years after the end of his voyage, and marries Ramandu's daughter; the couple serves as the rulers of Narnia. Fifteen years into their rule, Ramandu's daughter and Caspian X have a son named Rilian. In the 1953 novel The Silver Chair, the Lady of the Green Kirtle, in the form of a snake, kills Ramandu's daughter while she is sleeping in a glade during a May ride with a twenty-year old Rilian. Her body is taken back to the city, and she is remembered as "a gracious and wise lady in whose veins flowed the blood of stars". While attempting to seek revenge for his mother's death, Rilian is seduced by the Lady of the Green Kirtle. In the 1956 book The Last Battle, Ramandu's daughter is present, alongside her husband and son, as one of the "faithful" during the Great Reunion, in which all the series' good characters, except Susan Pevensie, are brought back together.

=== Television and film ===
Ramandu's daughter appears in the sections of the television serial The Chronicles of Narnia focusing on The Voyage of the Dawn Treader. In the miniseries, the character is portrayed in the same way as in the books, with her relationship and eventual marriage to Caspian X being the focus of her story arc. For the 2010 film version of The Voyage of the Dawn Treader, Ramandu's daughter is called Lilliandil. After Caspian X and his companions feast at Aslan's table a star falls from the sky and transforms into Lilliandil. She guides Caspian X and his crew to the Dark Island to find and save one of the Seven Great Lords of Narnia from a curse. Lilliandil tells Caspian X that the Lords were placed under a sleeping enchantment as they had physically threatened one another in Aslan's presence, which is strictly forbidden. After guiding the company to the island, she returns to the heavens; Caspian X says that he hopes to meet her again in the future, and she responds with a smile.

== Development and casting ==
According to Lewis scholar Paul F. Ford, Lewis decided to not name Ramandu's daughter as "an indication of the awe in which [he] wanted to surround her". Fantasy writer Colin Duriez said that Lewis was inspired by J. R. R. Tolkien's Middle Earth elves, specifically Lúthien and Arwen, who are both married to humans, to create the character. Duriez also connected Ramandu's daughter's parentage from the heavens to Tolkien's descriptions of angelic entities known as Maiar in his novels. (Note: Lewis was familiar with Tolkien's work on The Lord of the Rings prior to its publication in 1954 and 1955.)

For the television serial, English actress Gabrielle Anwar portrays Ramandu's daughter in one of her earliest roles; she is credited as Princess. Australian actress Laura Brent plays the character in the film version of The Voyage of the Dawn Treader; it was her first role in a feature film. Lewis' step-son Douglas Gresham created the name Lilliandil for the movie, and he said that it was intended to mimic the "imagery of the sea of lilies in the book as well as a very feminine and ethereal feel".

== Character analysis ==
According to academics, Lewis characterizes Ramandu's daughter through her goodness. Elizabeth Baird Hardy, a scholar of mythology, cited the character as "one of the few positive individuals who first appears as a full-grown adult". Fantasy literature scholar Monika B. Hilder interpreted Ramandu's daughter and Caspian X as "wise rulers willing to suffer for what is right for as long as they both shall live". English literature professor Devin Brown wrote that the character's respect for Aslan defines her goodness, in comparison to the evilness of the White Witch and her anger toward the lion.

Analyzing Ramandu's daughter as a "saintly mother", author Cathy McSporran contrasted her with the Lady of the Green Kirtle. She identified the latter, and all witches in The Chronicles of Narnia series, as embodying what Lewis characterizes as an "infernal Venus"; he coined this term in his 1942 book The Screwtape Letters to reference a female character who seduces a man to his death. McSporran defined Ramandu's daughter as the "natural opponent" of witches due to her innate goodness and beauty. According to McSporran, the character's maternal care for Rilian and ability to see through magical disguises are signs of her opposition to the Lady of the Green Kirtle.

Critics commented on the relationship between Ramandu’s daughter and Caspian X. The pair's relationship is one of the few romantic story arcs in The Chronicles of Narnia series. Devin Brown positively compared their courtship to that of Arwen and Aragorn from J. R. R. Tolkien's novel The Lord of the Rings. Brown also wrote that Lewis foreshadows to the relationship through Caspian X's failed courtship with the Duke of Galma prior to The Voyage of the Dawn Treader. While Lewis scholar Michael Ward cited the couple as an example of how the author was not "averse to his characters growing up and having romances", children's literature scholar Jennifer L. Miller felt that Lewis does not elaborate on their marriage in the novels. Miller wrote that the characters' interactions as husband and wife were restricted to the space between The Voyage of the Dawn Treader and The Silver Chair, only occurring in a place separate from Narnia. She argued that the portrayal of the pair’s relationship represented how "romantic love and desire can exist in exotic, strange locations far from Narnia", while Lewis reserved the fictional world as "the land of innocence and wonder" where such ideas would be inadmissible.

=== Religious analysis ===
Some critics argued that Lewis portrays Ramandu's daughter through Christian virtues. Connecting Ramandu's daughter with the women in the House of Holiness from Edmund Spenser's 1590 epic poem The Faerie Queene, Elizabeth Baird Hardy interpreted her titles as "idealized identifications of the virtues they represent", with Lewis' character corresponding to charity and hope. Monika B. Hilder argued that it is Ramandu's daughter's beauty that is used to signal her virtue, specifically through her positive effect on Caspian X. While describing the character's identity and agency, Hilder referred to her as "a mature, virtuous woman who is neither enchanted nor requires marriage to be whole"; Hilder wrote that Ramandu's daughter has an "active moral agency [which] underscores powerful humility" as well as "'feminine' obedience" and spirituality.

Ramandu's daughter was compared to women in the Bible. Hardy wrote that Ramandu's daughter was similar to Eve before the fall of man, describing them as "free from pretension and keenly aware of their roles in the universe". Hardy paralleled the death of Ramandu's daughter with the fall of Eve, comparing Rilian's addiction to sorcery and sexuality to the original sin. Aside from Eve, Ramandu's daughter was also likened to the Grail Maiden. Cathy McSporran likened the character's possession of the Knife of Stone, an instrument used to martyr Aslan, (Note: Aslan is represented as a lion in the books and media adaptations, and is known by the title: "The Lion King of the land of Narnia and all its creatures, the son of the Emperor-Beyond-the Sea, the true beast and the king of beasts, the highest king over all high kings, and the as-yet-unrecognized good and compassionate Lord of all, beginning with the children from England". According to British literature professor Peter J. Schakel, Lewis wrote Aslan as the "Narnian embodiment of Christ and the manifestation of God".) to the maiden's connection with the Holy Grail and the spear used in the crucifixion of Jesus.
