= Reepicheep =

Fictional mouse in The Chronicles of Narnia, books 2 and 3

- Narnia character
- Reepicheep as he appears in The Chronicles of Narnia

In-universe information
- Race: Talking Mouse
- Title: Chief Mouse
- Nationality: Narnia

Reepicheep the Mouse is a fictional character in the children's fantasy series The Chronicles of Narnia by C. S. Lewis. He appears as a minor character in Prince Caspian and as a major character in The Voyage of the Dawn Treader, and also briefly at the end of The Last Battle. Reepicheep is a Talking Mouse, the leader of the Talking Mice of Narnia; he is irascible yet imperturbably courteous, utterly without fear, and motivated by a deep concern for honour.

== Description ==
Reepicheep is described as a "gay and martial mouse", about two feet high when standing on his hind legs, with ears "nearly as long as (though broader than) a rabbit's"; small Talking Beasts in Narnia are very much larger than their "dumb" counterparts. He speaks with a shrill, piping voice. His fur is very dark, almost black. He wears a thin circlet of gold on his head, with a crimson feather. His weapon is a rapier.

== Appearances ==
=== In Prince Caspian ===
Reepicheep leads the Talking Mice to war against the Telmarines under Caspian's command. He is badly wounded in the climactic battle and loses his tail. Lucy heals his wounds with her magic cordial, but when he rises to address Aslan he finds that his tail has not regrown, and he apologises for appearing in such a dishonourable state. Aslan counters that he is perhaps too concerned about his honour. Reepicheep, in a key speech, replies to the effect that Talking Mice, being very small, would be at a constant disadvantage if they did not zealously guard their honour. The other Talking Mice prepare to cut their own tails off if their Chief is not allowed to retain his, at which point Aslan relents and miraculously restores Reepicheep's tail.

=== In The Voyage of the Dawn Treader ===
The only Talking Beast amongst the titular ship's crew, Reepicheep reveals that he has been driven since infancy by a vision of finding Aslan's Country across the sea in the far east of the Narnian world. His aspirations and code of honour bring him into conflict early with the egregious Eustace, but when the latter is turned into a dragon by a curse, Reepicheep becomes his chief friend and comforter. It is Reepicheep who urges the Dawn Treader to sail into the mysterious Island of Darkness, thus facilitating the rescue of Lord Rhoop, the fourth of the Seven Lords of Narnia whom it is their mission to find. The final three are found in a cursed sleep on Ramandu's Island, which can only be broken, the party are told, if they sail to the End of the World and there leave at least one of their number never to return; Reepicheep volunteers for this role and, at the end of the book, carries through with it, thereby both breaking the curse and fulfilling his vision.

=== In The Last Battle ===
When the main characters reach the gates of the Garden in Aslan's Country at the end of The Last Battle, it is Reepicheep who greets them.

== Thematic significance ==
=== Christian elements ===
While The Chronicles of Narnia are often described as an allegory for Christianity, Lewis (himself an expert on allegory in literature) disputed this description on technical grounds, since most of the characters and plot elements do not "stand for" figures or events in Christian doctrine in any simple way. When a class of American fifth-graders wrote asking what the characters in Prince Caspian represented, Lewis replied:

You are mistaken when you think that everything in the books "represents" something in this world. Things do that in The Pilgrim's Progress but I'm not writing in that way ... So the answer to your first two questions is that Reepicheep and Nick-i-Brick [sic] don't, in that sense, represent anyone. But of course anyone in our world who devotes his whole life to seeking Heaven will be like R, and anyone who wants some worldly thing so badly that he is ready to use wicked means to get it will be likely to behave like N.

In a letter to one reader, Lewis laid out the plan of the Narnia series: "The whole Narnian story is about Christ." Each book, he said, was intended to showcase a different aspect of Christianity, and for The Voyage of the Dawn Treader it was "the spiritual life (specially in Reepicheep)".

=== Chivalry ===
As a model both of ferocity on the battlefield and of courtesy in polite society, Reepicheep embodies the knightly ideal Lewis prescribes for manhood in his 1940 essay The Necessity of Chivalry.

== Portrayals ==
- In the 1989 television serial produced by the BBC, Prince Caspian and the Voyage of the Dawn Treader, Reepicheep was portrayed by Warwick Davis.
- For the BBC Radio 4 adaptation (1995−1997), Reepicheep was voiced by Sylvester McCoy.
- For the Focus on the Family Radio Theatre adaptation (1999−2002), Reepicheep was voiced by Robert Benfield.
- In the Walden Media Narnia films, Reepicheep was voiced by Eddie Izzard in Prince Caspian, and by Simon Pegg in The Voyage of the Dawn Treader.
