= The Voyage of the Dawn Treader =

1952 children's novel by C. S. Lewis

- First edition dustjacket
- Author: C. S. Lewis
- Illustrator: Pauline Baynes
- Cover artist: Pauline Baynes
- Language: English
- Series: The Chronicles of Narnia
- Release number: 3
- Genre: Children's fantasy novel, Christian literature
- Publisher: Geoffrey Bles
- Publication date: 15 September 1952
- Publication place: United Kingdom
- Media type: Print (hardcover)
- Pages: 223 pp (first edition); 52,038 words (US)
- ISBN: 978-0-00-671680-8 (Collins, 1998; full colour)
- OCLC: 2805288
- LC Class: PZ8.L48 Vo
- Preceded by: Prince Caspian
- Followed by: The Silver Chair
- Text: The Voyage of the Dawn Treader online

The Voyage of the Dawn Treader (Note: The name of the ship Dawn Treader is italicised in the title on the first edition dust jacket. By English typographical conventions, both book titles and ship names are usually italicised when they are written. Where "Dawn Treader" appears as part of the full title, it might be distinguished by another typographic convention but in this article, the entire title is simply italicised. "Dawn Treader" alone always refers to the featured ship.) is a portal fantasy novel written by British author C. S. Lewis, published by Geoffrey Bles in 1952. It was the third published of seven novels in The Chronicles of Narnia (1950–1956). Macmillan US published an American edition within the calendar year, with substantial revisions which were retained in the United States until 1994. It is volume five in recent editions, which are sequenced according to the novels' internal chronology. Like the other Chronicles of Narnia, The Voyage of the Dawn Treader was illustrated by Pauline Baynes, and her work has been retained in many later editions.

In the novel, Edmund and Lucy Pevensie (along with their cousin Eustace Scrubb) are taken out of this world into the enchanted land of Narnia. They are reunited with the Pevensies' friend, King Caspian X of Narnia, aboard Caspian's ship, the Dawn Treader. Caspian has vowed to sail east across the Great Eastern Ocean for a year and a day to find the seven lost Lords of Narnia.

Lewis dedicated the book to Geoffrey Corbett, who later changed his name to Jeffrey Barfield and is the adopted son of Owen Barfield, a friend of Lewis's.

The Voyage of the Dawn Treader has been adapted and recorded as four episodes of a BBC television series in 1989 and as a feature film in 2010.

== Plot summary ==
The two youngest Pevensie children, Edmund and Lucy, are staying with their odious cousin Eustace Scrubb while their older brother, Peter, is studying for an exam with Professor Kirke, and their older sister, Susan, is travelling through America with their parents. Edmund, Lucy, and Eustace are drawn into the Narnian world through a picture of a ship at sea. (The painting, hanging neglected in the guest bedroom in which Lucy was staying, had been an unwanted present to Eustace's parents.) The three children land in the ocean near the pictured vessel, the titular Dawn Treader, and are taken aboard.

The Dawn Treader is the ship of Caspian X, King of Narnia, whom Edmund and Lucy (along with Peter and Susan) helped to regain the throne of Narnia in Prince Caspian. Also present on board are the Lord Drinian (the captain of the Dawn Treader) and first mate Rhince.

Peace has been established in the three years since then, and Caspian has undertaken a quest in fulfilment of his coronation oath to sail east for a year and a day to find the seven lost Lords of Narnia: Argoz, Bern, Mavramorn, Octesian, Restimar, Revilian, and Rhoop. He mentions that Trumpkin the dwarf has been left in charge of Narnia as Lord Regent in his absence. Lucy and Edmund are delighted to be back in the Narnian world, but Eustace is less enthusiastic, as he has never been there before and had taunted his cousins with his belief that this alternate universe had never existed. The Talking Mouse Reepicheep is also on board, as he hopes to find Aslan's Country beyond the seas of the "utter East". When Eustace teases Reepicheep, much is revealed about the mouse's pugnacious character.

They first make landfall in the Lone Islands, nominally Narnian territory but fallen away from Narnian ways: in particular the slave trade flourishes here, despite Narnian law stating that it is forbidden. Caspian, Edmund, Lucy, Eustace, and Reepicheep are captured as merchandise by a slave trader, and a man "buys" Caspian before they even reach the slave market. He turns out to be the first lost lord, Bern, who had moved to the islands and married a woman there after being banished from Narnia by Miraz. When Caspian reveals his identity, Lord Bern acknowledges him as King. Caspian reclaims the islands for Narnia and replaces Gumpas, the greedy governor, with Lord Bern, whom he names Duke of the Lone Islands. Caspian also declares that slavery is forbidden in all his dominions and that all slaves are free.

At the second island they visit, Eustace leaves the group to avoid participating in the work needed to render the ship seaworthy after a storm has damaged it and hides in a dead dragon's cave to escape a sudden downpour. The dragon's treasure arouses his greed: he fills his pockets with gold and jewels and puts on a large golden bracelet; but as he sleeps, he is transformed into a dragon. In his new guise, he becomes aware of how bad his previous behaviour was; he attempts to shed his dragon skin without success. It is only with the help of Aslan that he is able to become human again, though the process is very painful. As a result of his experiences, he is now a much nicer person. Caspian recognises the bracelet: it belonged to Lord Octesian, another of the lost lords. They speculate that the dragon killed Octesian – or even that the dragon was Octesian.

The crew narrowly escape being sunk by a sea-serpent and stop at Deathwater Island, so named for a pool of water which turns everything immersed in it into gold, including the lost Lord Restimar. Then they land on the Duffers' Island, where Lucy removes an invisibility spell from the Duffers (later Dufflepuds) at their request and befriends Coriakin, the Magician who cast it. Next they reach the "Island Where Dreams Come True", called the Dark Island since it is permanently hidden in darkness. It turns out that the dreams that come true are not necessarily nice dreams and Lord Rhoop, whom they rescue there, has been tormented for years by his nightmares. Eventually they reach the Island of the Star, where they find the three remaining lost lords in enchanted sleep, caused by one of them wielding the knife that the White Witch used to kill Aslan. Ramandu, the fallen star who lives on the island with his daughter, tells them that the only way to awaken them is to sail to the edge of the world and to leave one member of the crew behind there. Lord Rhoop wishes to "sleep without dreams" beside his friends until they wake and everyone agrees before they set out again.

The Dawn Treader continues sailing into an area where merpeople dwell and the water turns sweet rather than salty. At last the water becomes so shallow that the ship can go no farther. Caspian orders a boat lowered and announces that he will go to the world's end with Reepicheep. The crew object, saying that as King of Narnia he has no right to abandon them. Caspian goes to his cabin in a temper, but returns to say that Aslan appeared in his cabin and told him that only Lucy, Edmund, Eustace, and Reepicheep will go on.

These four venture in a small boat through a sea of lilies until they reach a wall of water that extends into the sky. Fulfilling Ramandu's condition, Reepicheep paddles his coracle up the waterfall and is never again seen in Narnia. Edmund, Eustace, and Lucy find a Lamb, who transforms into Aslan and tells them that Edmund and Lucy will not return to Narnia. When Lucy becomes sorrowful and despondent about the prospect of not seeing Aslan again, Aslan tells the children that he exists in their world, too. Aslan adds, "There I have another name. You must learn to know me by that name. This was the very reason why you were brought to Narnia, that by knowing me here for a little, you may know me better there." Aslan then sends the three children home.

Back in the real world, everyone remarks about how much Eustace has changed.

== Main characters ==
- Lucy Pevensie – the youngest of the four Pevensie children.
- Edmund Pevensie – the next youngest.
- Eustace Scrubb – a cousin of the four Pevensie siblings; Edmund and Lucy are staying with him at the house that Eustace shares with his parents.
- Caspian X – the King of Narnia.
- Reepicheep – a valiant talking mouse who is a main ally to King Caspian.
- Lord Drinian – The captain of the Dawn Treader.
- Seven Great Lords of Narnia – characters whom Caspian is seeking. Of the seven, two prove to be dead and three in an enchanted sleep; only the Lords Bern and Rhoop have any part in the story.
- Ramandu – a "star at rest" who regains youth through fire-berries.
- Ramandu's daughter – the future Queen of Narnia, wife of Caspian, and mother of Rilian.
- Pug – slaver and pirate of the Lone Islands, who takes the protagonists prisoner.
- Gumpas – governor of the Lone Islands, enabler of slavery, whom Caspian deposes.
- Coriakin – the Magician (and star) who rules the Dufflepuds (monopods) as penance for unspecified misdeeds.

== Differences between British and American editions ==
Several weeks or months after reading the proofs for the British edition of The Chronicles, Lewis read through the proofs for the American edition. While doing so, he made several changes to the text. HarperCollins took over publication of the series in 1994 and made the unusual decision to ignore the changes that Lewis had made and use the earlier text as the standard for their editions.

In Dawn Treader, Lewis made two changes, one minor and one more substantial. The minor change appears in the first chapter where Lewis changes the description of Eustace from "far too stupid to make anything up himself" to "quite incapable of making anything up himself". Paul Ford, author of Companion to Narnia, suggests that Lewis might have felt the need to soften the passage for his American readers or perhaps he was starting to like Eustace better. Peter Schakel, author of Imagination and the Arts in C.S. Lewis, opines that the passage should have been changed in both cases as "calling a character 'stupid' in a children's book is insensitive and unwise". Both Schakel and Ford agree that it is not an accurate depiction of Eustace as Lewis describes him, and this too may be the reason for the change.

The more substantive change appears in Chapter 12, "The Dark Island", where Lewis rewrote the ending in a way that, Schakel maintains, improves the imaginative experience considerably.

The reader cannot [in this version] dismiss the island as unreal or as no longer existing: it is still there, and anyone who can get to Narnia still could get caught in it. More important, the inserted analogy, with its second-person pronouns, draws readers into the episode and evokes in them the same emotions the characters experience. This is no laughing matter, as the earlier version risks making it.

A side by side comparison of the ending of chapter 12 follows:

British Edition	Pre-1994 American Edition
In a few moments [...] warm, blue world again. And all at once everybody realized that there was nothing to be afraid of and never had been. They blinked their eyes and looked about them. The brightness of [...] grime or scum. And then first one, and then another, began laughing. “I reckon we've made pretty good fools of ourselves," said Rynelf.	In a few moments [...] warm, blue world again. And just as there are moments when simply to lie in bed and see the daylight pouring through your window and to hear the cheerful voice of an early postman or milkman down below and to realise that it was only a dream: it wasn't real, is so heavenly that it was very nearly worth having the nightmare in order to have the joy of waking, so they all felt when they came out of the dark. The brightness of [...] grime or scum.
Lucy lost no time [...] Grant me a boon." "What is it?" asked Caspian.	Lucy lost no time [...] Grant me a boon." "What is it?" asked Caspian.
"Never to bring me back there," he said. He pointed astern. They all looked. But they saw only bright blue sea and bright blue sky. The Dark Island and the darkness had vanished for ever. "Why!" cried Lord Rhoop. "You have destroyed it!" "I don't think it was us," said Lucy.	"Never to ask me, nor to let any other ask me, what I have seen during my years on the Dark Island." "An easy boon, my Lord," answered Caspian, and added with a shudder. "Ask you: I should think not. I would give all my treasure not to hear it."
"Sire," said Drinian, [...] the clock round myself."	"Sire," said Drinian, [...] the clock round myself."
So all afternoon with great joy they sailed south-east with a fair wind. But nobody noticed when the albatross had disappeared.	So all afternoon with great joy they sailed south-east with a fair wind, and the hump of darkness grew smaller and smaller astern. But nobody noticed when the albatross had disappeared.

== Reception ==
Boucher and McComas found Voyage "not quite up to the high level set by previous Narnian adventures". They singled out Reepicheep for praise as "one of Lewis's finest imaginings".

Researcher Sue Baines wrote:

In contrast to other Narnia books, Dawn Treader has virtually no overt villains, other than the slavers in the very beginning who are quickly overcome and disposed of. Rather, the plot confronts the protagonists again and again with the flaws of their own character. Eustace's greediness and general bad behavior cause him to turn into a dragon, and he must work hard to show himself worthy of becoming human again; Caspian is tempted to seize the magic pool which turns everything to gold – which would have turned Caspian himself into a greedy tyrant ready to kill in order to preserve his power and wealth; later, Caspian faces the nobler but still wrong-headed temptation to go off to Aslan's Country and abandon his responsibilities as a King; Lucy is tempted to make herself magically beautiful, which would have led to her becoming the focus of terrible wars devastating Narnia and all its neighbors; and having resisted this temptation, she succumbs to a lesser temptation to magically spy on her schoolmates – and is punished by hearing malicious things and destroying what could have developed into an enduring nice friendship. ... Edmund, who had undergone a very severe test of his character on his first arrival in Narnia, is spared such an experience in the present book, and acts as the most mature and grown-up member of the group.

== Influences ==
Arguably, Voyage of the Dawn Treader is the novel which shows the most influence of Lewis' Irish background. It is reminiscent of the Immram genre of Irish literature. Lewis draws inspiration from the Medieval text The Voyage of Saint Brendan, a clear example of the Immram. Lewis' characters follow the plot of St. Brendan's voyage almost exactly, showing the influence of the classic Celtic fable. However, unlike such voyages, Dawn Treader travels East rather than West, maybe because Lewis wanted to signify new beginnings and rebirth, as opposed to the traditional connotation of death and closure associated with heading west.

The novel also underscores the idea of Aslan representing Jesus Christ. In the end of the novel Aslan appears as a lamb which has been used as a symbol for him, in a scene evoking the Gospel of John 21:9.

Eustace's transformation into a dragon in the presence of gold recalls the fate of Fáfnir in Norse myth. Had Eustace been educated to know about myths and fairytales, he would have known that dragons' gold is cursed.

In chapter 13, Ulysses in Dante's Inferno (Canto 26 v.112-119) is closely paraphrased by one of the three lords when they reach Ramandu's island.

Mary Coombe noted that "The Fifth book of Rabelais' Gargantua and Pantagruel depicts a King with his loyal followers sailing in a ship, stopping at various islands and having strange adventures. To be sure, in Lewis' handling of the same theme, the details of the King, his retinue and the islands they visit are all very different from those of Rabelais. [...] Lewis considered Rabelais to be mainly 'a teller of coarse jokes'. It might have appealed to Lewis to take up a theme from Rabelais and treat it in a less coarse way. In particular, the quest undertaken by Pantagruel and his companions is entirely and manifestly farcical, while that of Caspian is conducted very earnestly indeed."

== Adaptations ==
=== Theatre ===
- In 1983, the world premiere of the musical stage adaptation of The Voyage of the Dawn Treader was produced by Northwestern College (Minnesota) at the Totino Fine Arts Center.
- A stage adaptation of "Voyage of the Dawn Treader", written and directed by Ken Hill, designed by Sarah-Jane McClellan with music by Brendan Healy, was first presented at the Newcastle Playhouse on 29 November 1985.
- BBC Radio produced a radio play based on the book in 1994.
- Focus on the Family released a longer version as part of its complete production of all the Chronicles of Narnia.
- In 2000, a musical version was written and produced by the Alternative Community School of Ithaca, NY.
- BG Touring Theatre company produced a version of the Glynn Robins stage adaptation of The Voyage of the Dawn Treader at the 2006 Edinburgh Festival Fringe.

=== Film ===
The Voyage of the Dawn Treader is the third installment in The Chronicles of Narnia film series from Walden Media. Unlike the earlier two films, which were distributed by Disney, it was distributed by 20th Century Fox. However, Disney now owns the rights following the acquisition of 20th Century Fox in 2019. Michael Apted took over as director from Andrew Adamson, who opted to produce with Mark Johnson, Perry Moore and Douglas Gresham. Will Poulter joined the cast as Eustace Scrubb, while Georgie Henley, Skandar Keynes, Ben Barnes, Liam Neeson, and Tilda Swinton all returned.

The film had a wide theatrical release in traditional 2D, and a limited theatrical release in RealD 3D and Digital 3D in the United States, Canada, and United Kingdom on 10 December 2010.

=== Television ===
- The BBC produced a TV miniseries of The Voyage of the Dawn Treader (1989); it was combined with the previous book and released as Prince Caspian and the Voyage of the Dawn Treader.

== Legacy ==
"The Dawntreader" is a song about the sea by Joni Mitchell, one track on her debut album Song to a Seagull (1968).

"Prince Caspian" is a song by Phish on their 1996 album Billy Breathes which begins with the lyric "O to be Prince Caspian, afloat upon the waves." The references to "stumps instead of feet" and "demons in their caves" may obliquely refer to episodes in The Voyage of the Dawn Treader.

"Dawn Treader" is a song by Charlotte Hatherley on her 2007 album The Deep Blue.

The spaceship Dawn Treader in Greg Bear's novel Anvil of Stars is presumably also named for the ship in this book.

== Sources ==
- Downing, David C. (2005). Into the Wardrobe: C. S. Lewis and the Narnia Chronicles. San Francisco: Jossey-Bass. ISBN 978-0-7879-7890-7.
- Duriez, Colin (2 June 2004). A Field Guide to Narnia. IVP Books. ISBN 978-0-8308-3207-1.
- Ford, Paul (2005). Companion to Narnia: A Complete Guide to the Magical World of C. S. Lewis's The Chronicles of Narnia. HarperCollins Publishers. ISBN 978-0-06-079127-8.
- Schakel, Peter (2002). Imagination and the Arts in C.S. Lewis: Journeying to Narnia and Other Worlds. University of Missouri Press. p. 35. ISBN 978-0-8262-1407-2.
