= The Chronicles of Narnia (film series) =

Film series (2005–2010)

- Official film series logo
- Directed by: Andrew Adamson (1–2); Michael Apted (3)
- Screenplay by: Ann Peacock (1); Andrew Adamson (1–2); Christopher Markus (1–3); Stephen McFeely (1–3); Michael Petroni (3)
- Based on: The Chronicles of Narnia by C. S. Lewis
- Produced by: Mark Johnson (1–3); Philip Steuer (1–3); Andrew Adamson (2–3)
- Starring: Georgie Henley; Skandar Keynes; William Moseley; Anna Popplewell; Ben Barnes; Will Poulter; Tilda Swinton; Liam Neeson
- Cinematography: Donald McAlpine (1); Karl Walter Lindenlaub (2); Dante Spinotti (3)
- Edited by: Sim Evan-Jones (1–2); Rick Shaine (3)
- Music by: Harry Gregson-Williams (1–2); David Arnold (3)
- Production companies: Walden Media (1–3); Walt Disney Pictures (1–2); Fox 2000 Pictures (3)
- Distributed by: Walt Disney Studios Motion Pictures (1–2); 20th Century Fox (3)
- Release dates: December 9, 2005 (1); May 16, 2008 (2); December 10, 2010 (3)
- Running time: 406 minutes (1–3)
- Countries: United Kingdom; United States
- Language: English
- Budget: Total (3 films): $560,000,000
- Box office: Total (3 films): $1,580,364,900

The Chronicles of Narnia is a fantasy film series and media franchise based on The Chronicles of Narnia, a series of novels by C. S. Lewis. The series revolves around the adventures of children in the world of Narnia, guided by Aslan, a wise and powerful lion that can speak and is the true king of Narnia. The children heavily featured in the films are the Pevensie siblings, and a prominent antagonist is the White Witch (also known as Queen Jadis). The franchise also includes short films, digital series, and video games.

From the seven books, three were adapted—The Lion, the Witch and the Wardrobe (2005), Prince Caspian (2008), and The Voyage of the Dawn Treader (2010)—which collectively grossed over $1.5 billion worldwide, although critical and commercial success declined with each release. The first two films were directed by Andrew Adamson, and the third film was directed by Michael Apted. All were produced by Walden Media.

Plans for a fourth film in the Walden series were abandoned when it was announced in 2018 that new adaptations would be made for Netflix. Based on the first chronological book in the series and directed by Greta Gerwig, Narnia: The Magician's Nephew is set for a wide theatrical release on 12 February 2027, before streaming on Netflix on 2 April 2027.

== Development ==
C. S. Lewis did not sell the film rights to the Narnia series during his lifetime, as he was skeptical that any cinematic adaptation could render the more fantastical elements and characters of the story realistically. (Note: His general dislike of cinema is seen in Collected Letters, Vol. 2, a letter to his brother Warren on March 3, 1940, p. 361; see also All My Road Before Me, June 1, 1926, p. 405) Only after seeing a demo reel of CGI animals did Douglas Gresham, Lewis's stepson and eventual literary executor, give approval for a film adaptation.

Although the plan was originally to produce the films in the same order as the books were published, it was reported that The Magician's Nephew, which recounts the creation of Narnia, would be the fourth feature film in the series, instead of The Silver Chair. It was rumored that The Magician's Nephew was chosen in an attempt to reboot the series, after The Voyage of the Dawn Treader grossed less than the two previous films. In March 2011, Walden Media confirmed that they intended The Magician's Nephew to be next in the series, but said that it was not yet in development.

In October 2011, Gresham stated that Walden Media's contract with the C. S. Lewis estate had expired and suggested that Walden Media's lapse in renegotiating their contract with the C. S. Lewis estate was due to conflicts between the companies about the direction of future films. On 1 October 2013, the C. S. Lewis Company announced a partnership with The Mark Gordon Company and announced that The Chronicles of Narnia: The Silver Chair was officially in pre-production.

== Films ==
The Chronicles of Narnia films
Film	Release date	Directed by	Screenplay by	Produced by
The Lion, the Witch and the Wardrobe	9 December 2005	Andrew Adamson	Ann Peacock, Andrew Adamson, Stephen McFeely & Christopher Markus	Mark Johnson & Phillip Steuer
Prince Caspian	16 May 2008	Andrew Adamson	Andrew Adamson, Stephen McFeely & Christopher Markus	Mark Johnson, Andrew Adamson & Phillip Steuer
The Voyage of the Dawn Treader	10 December 2010	Michael Apted	Michael Petroni, Stephen McFeely & Christopher Markus	Mark Johnson, Andrew Adamson & Phillip Steuer

=== The Chronicles of Narnia: The Lion, the Witch and the Wardrobe (2005) ===
The Lion, the Witch and the Wardrobe, based on the 1950 novel of the same title, is the first film in the series. Directed by Andrew Adamson, it was shot mainly in New Zealand, though locations were used in Poland, the Czech Republic, and the United Kingdom. The story follows the four British Pevensie siblings, who are evacuated during the Blitz to the countryside, where they find a wardrobe that leads to the fantasy world of Narnia. There, they must ally with the lion Aslan against the forces of the White Witch, who has placed Narnia in an eternal winter. This movie was released theatrically on 9 December 2005 and on DVD on 4 April 2006 and grossed over $745 million worldwide.

=== The Chronicles of Narnia: Prince Caspian (2008) ===
Prince Caspian, based on the 1951 novel of the same title, is the second film in the series and the last distributed by Walt Disney Pictures. The story follows the same Pevensie children who were transported to Narnia in the previous film as they return to Narnia, where 1,300 years have passed, and the land has been invaded by the Telmarines. The four Pevensie children aid Prince Caspian in his struggle for the throne against his corrupt uncle, King Miraz. This movie was released on 16 May 2008. It grossed $419 million worldwide.

=== The Chronicles of Narnia: The Voyage of the Dawn Treader (2010) ===
The Voyage of the Dawn Treader, based on the 1952 novel of the same title, is the first film in the series not to be co-produced by Disney, who dropped out over a budget dispute with Walden Media. In January 2009, it was announced that Fox 2000 Pictures would replace Disney for future installments, but because of the acquisition of 21st Century Fox, Disney now owns the rights to all the movies. This movie was directed by Michael Apted, and it was filmed completely in Australia.

The story follows the two younger Pevensie children as they return to Narnia with their cousin, Eustace Scrubb. They join Caspian, now king of Narnia, in his quest to rescue seven lost lords and save Narnia from a corrupting evil that resides on a dark island. This movie was released on 10 December 2010 (in RealD 3D in select theatres) and grossed over $415 million worldwide.

== Main cast ==
=== Children ===
- Skandar Keynes as Edmund Pevensie, title: King Edmund the Just; the younger Pevensie child and a King of Narnia during the Golden Age.
- Georgie Henley as Lucy Pevensie, title: Queen Lucy the Valiant, the youngest Pevensie child and a Queen of Narnia during the Golden Age.
- William Moseley as Peter Pevensie, title: High King Peter the Magnificent, the eldest Pevensie child and the High King of Narnia during the Golden Age.
- Anna Popplewell as Susan Pevensie, title: Queen Susan the Gentle, the elder Pevensie child and a Queen of Narnia during the Golden Age.
- Will Poulter as Eustace Scrubb, the Pevensie children's arrogant cousin.

=== Other main characters ===
- Liam Neeson as the voice of Aslan, the magnificent and majestically powerful lion who helps govern and maintain order in Narnia; a mystical world of his creation.
- Tilda Swinton as Jadis, the White Witch; the former queen of Charn and a witch who ruled Narnia during the events of The Lion, the Witch and the Wardrobe.
- Ben Barnes as Caspian X (also known as "Prince Caspian"), the Telmarine prince who becomes King of Narnia after overthrowing his evil uncle Miraz.
- Eddie Izzard and Simon Pegg as the voice of Reepicheep in Prince Caspian and The Voyage of the Dawn Treader, respectively: the noble and courageous mouse who fights for Aslan and the freedom of Narnia.
- James McAvoy as Mr. Tumnus in The Lion, the Witch and the Wardrobe.
- Ray Winstone as the voice of Mr. Beaver in The Lion, the Witch and the Wardrobe.
- Dawn French as the voice of Mrs. Beaver in The Lion, the Witch and the Wardrobe.
- Peter Dinklage as Trumpkin in Prince Caspian.

=== Table of the recurring cast ===
List indicators

This section includes characters who will appear or have appeared in more than two films in the series.

- An empty grey cell indicates the character was not in the film, or that the character's official presence has not yet been confirmed.
- ^{C} indicates a cameo role.
- ^{O} indicates an older version of the character.
- ^{V} indicates a voice-only role.

Role	The Lion, the Witch and the Wardrobe	Prince Caspian	The Voyage of the Dawn Treader
Lucy Pevensie	Georgie Henley Rachael Henley^{O}	Georgie Henley	Georgie Henley
Edmund Pevensie	Skandar Keynes Mark Wells^{O}	Skandar Keynes	Skandar Keynes
Peter Pevensie	William Moseley Noah Huntley^{O}	William Moseley	William Moseley^{C}
Susan Pevensie	Anna Popplewell Sophie Winkleman^{O}	Anna Popplewell	Anna Popplewell^{C}
Aslan	Liam Neeson^{V}	Liam Neeson^{V}	Liam Neeson^{V}
Jadis the White Witch	Tilda Swinton	Tilda Swinton^{C}	Tilda Swinton^{C}
Digory Kirke	Jim Broadbent		
Prince Caspian X		Ben Barnes	Ben Barnes
Reepicheep		Eddie Izzard^{V}	Simon Pegg^{V}

== Crew ==
Role	Film		
Role	The Lion, the Witch and the Wardrobe	Prince Caspian	The Voyage of the Dawn Treader
Role	2005	2008	2010
Director(s)	Andrew Adamson	Andrew Adamson	Michael Apted
Producer(s)	Mark Johnson & Phillip Steuer	Mark Johnson, Andrew Adamson & Phillip Steuer	Mark Johnson, Andrew Adamson & Phillip Steuer
Writer(s)	Ann Peacock, Andrew Adamson, Stephen McFeely & Christopher Markus	Andrew Adamson, Stephen McFeely & Christopher Markus	Michael Petroni, Stephen McFeely & Christopher Markus
Composer(s)	Harry Gregson-Williams	Harry Gregson-Williams	David Arnold
Cinematographer(s)	Donald McAlpine	Karl Walter Lindenlaub	Dante Spinotti
Editor(s)	Jim May & Sim Evan-Jones	Sim Evan-Jones	Rick Shaine
U.S. release date	9 December 2005	16 May 2008	10 December 2010
Distributor(s)	Walt Disney Studios Motion Pictures	Walt Disney Studios Motion Pictures	20th Century Fox

== Reception ==
=== Box office performance ===
The series grossed over $1.5 billion worldwide, but critical and commercial reception diminished with each film.

Film	Release date	Box office gross			All-time ranking		Budget	Reference
Film	Release date	North America	Other territories	Worldwide	North America	Worldwide	Budget	Reference
The Lion, the Witch and the Wardrobe	December 9, 2005	$291,710,957	$453,302,158	$745,013,115	78	86	$180 million	
Prince Caspian	May 16, 2008	$141,621,490	$278,044,078	$419,665,568	363	236	$220 million	
The Voyage of the Dawn Treader	December 10, 2010	$104,386,950	$311,299,267	$415,686,217	621	238	$150 million	
Total		$537,719,397	$1,042,645,503	$1,580,364,900			$560 million	

=== Critical response ===
Film	Rotten Tomatoes	Metacritic	CinemaScore
The Lion, the Witch and the Wardrobe	76% (216 reviews)	75 (39 reviews)	A+
Prince Caspian	66% (188 reviews)	62 (34 reviews)	A-
The Voyage of the Dawn Treader	49% (168 reviews)	53 (33 reviews)	A-

== Future ==
=== Abandoned The Silver Chair adaptation ===
After Walden Media's contract for the series' film rights expired in 2011, The C. S. Lewis Company announced on 1 October 2013 that it had agreed with The Mark Gordon Company to adapt the 1953 novel The Silver Chair. Mark Gordon and Douglas Gresham, along with Vincent Sieber, the Los Angeles based director of The C. S. Lewis Company, would serve as producers and work with The Mark Gordon Company on developing the script. On 5 December 2013, it was announced that David Magee would write the screenplay. In July 2014, the official Narnia website allowed the opportunity for fans to suggest names for the Lady of the Green Kirtle, the main antagonist. The winning name was to be selected by Mark Gordon and David Magee for use in the final script of The Silver Chair.

The film's producers have called the film a reboot of the series, with a wholly new cast and creative crew. On 9 August 2016, it was announced that Sony's TriStar Pictures and Entertainment One was set to finance and distribute the fourth film with The Mark Gordon Company (which eOne owns) and The C. S. Lewis Company. In April 2017, it was announced that Joe Johnston had been hired to direct The Silver Chair.

=== Netflix reboot ===
On 3 October 2018, it was announced that Netflix and The C. S. Lewis Company had made a multi-year agreement to develop a new series of film and TV adaptations of The Chronicles of Narnia. With this announcement, all previously announced plans for The Silver Chair were superseded. A film directed by Greta Gerwig, based on the first chronological book in the series, Narnia: The Magician's Nephew, is set for a wide theatrical release on 12 February 2027, before streaming on Netflix on 2 April 2027.

== See also ==
- Outline of Narnia
- The Chronicles of Narnia (1988–1990 TV series)
- The Lion, the Witch and the Wardrobe (1979 film)
