= Rilian =

Fictional character in The Chronicles of Narnia

Rilian of Narnia
- Narnia character
- Rilian, as portrayed by Richard Henders in the 1990 BBC miniseries

In-universe information
- Race: Human
- Title: King of Narnia
- Family: Caspian X (father); Ramandu's daughter (mother); See relations of Caspian
- Nationality: Narnian

In C. S. Lewis' Chronicles of Narnia fictional series, Rilian (2325–?) is the son of King Caspian and the grandson of Ramandu the star. Rilian appears in two of the seven books, The Silver Chair and briefly in The Last Battle.

== Biographical summary ==
=== In The Silver Chair ===
When Eustace Scrubb and Jill Pole arrive in Narnia in The Silver Chair, Prince Rilian (the only son of the now elderly King Caspian) has been missing for ten years. After his mother was bitten and killed by a green serpent, Rilian revisited the area of his mother's death many times to track down and kill the serpent, but eventually he vanished and no trace of him was ever found. Since then, many others also went missing while searching for him.

When Eustace and Jill reach Cair Paravel, they learn that Caspian has embarked on a voyage to "see again the places of his youth" – but many believe that he has gone to ask Aslan who the next King of Narnia should be, as he fears he will never see his son again.

Eustace and Jill meet Puddleglum, a marsh-wiggle, and the three seek Rilian to the north in the land of giants. Along the way they encounter the Lady of the Green Kirtle and her silent companion, a knight in black armour. Eventually they find their way underground to the Shallow Lands ruled by the Lady of the Green Kirtle, where they meet the black knight again. He tells the three that he suffers from nightly psychotic episodes and therefore must be bound every night to a silver chair. If he is released, he warns, he will kill everyone within sight, and turn into a deadly green serpent.

Once the knight is tied to the enchanted chair, however, he regains his memory and sanity. He orders the companions to untie him and makes increasingly violent threats. Eventually he begs them to release him in the name of Aslan. The children recognise this as the sign: they had promised to obey the request of one who asks in Aslan's name, so they reluctantly release him. After destroying the chair with his sword, he then reveals that he is Prince Rilian, and informs them of how the Lady kept him prisoner underground, enchanted by day and returning to sanity only at night. He hacks the silver chair to pieces with his sword.

The Lady returns and attempts to bewitch the four companions. When this fails, she transforms into a green serpent, and Rilian realizes that he has been enslaved all these years by his mother's murderer. They kill the serpent and return to Narnia, where Rilian meets his father just before the old king dies. He then ascends to the Narnian throne.

=== In The Last Battle ===
At the beginning of The Last Battle, which follows next chronologically, Rilian had been dead for more than 200 years. Eustace and Jill help his descendant Tirian, the last king of Narnia. Rilian appears briefly alongside his father and mother at the great reunion at the end of the book.

Lewis never mentions the name of Rilian's wife or that of his child or children, although he clearly married and had at least one child, as King Tirian is the great-grandson of Rilian's own great-grandson.

== Portrayals ==
- In the 1990 television serial produced by the BBC, The Silver Chair, Prince Rilian was played by Richard Henders. Since he is shown in a flashback early in the story when the owls tell Eustace and Jill his story, he appears wearing a silver mask when the children encounter him underground, in order to conceal his identity from the viewer. His excuse for wearing the mask is that the Green Lady told him he was enchanted to look hideous and must hide his "ugly" face with a mask. After he regains his sanity, he takes off the mask to reveal his identity.

Regnal titles
Preceded by Caspian	King of Narnia; 2356-2385	Succeeded by unknown, eventually by Erlian
