= Prince Caspian (character) =

Fictional character in The Chronicles of Narnia

- Narnia character
- Ben Barnes as Prince Caspian in The Chronicles of Narnia: Prince Caspian

In-universe information
- Full name: Caspian X
- Nicknames: Caspian the Seafarer; Caspian the Navigator
- Race: Human
- Title(s): King of Narnia, Emperor of the Lone Islands, Lord of Cair Paravel, Lord of Telmar, Baron of Ettinsmor, Duke of the Lantern Waste, Duke of the Seven Isles, Duke of Galma, Count of the Western March, Emperor of Dragon Island
- Family: Caspian IX (father); King Miraz (uncle); Queen Prunaprismia (aunt)
- Spouse: Ramandu's daughter (wife)
- Children: Rilian (son)
- Nationality: Telmarine/Narnian

Prince Caspian (also known as Caspian X, King of Narnia, Lord of Cair Paravel and Emperor of The Lone Islands, and as Caspian the Seafarer or Caspian the Navigator) is a fictional character in The Chronicles of Narnia by C. S. Lewis. He is featured in three books in the series: Prince Caspian, The Voyage of the Dawn Treader, and The Silver Chair. He also appears at the end of The Last Battle.

== Biographical summary ==
Caspian is described as noble, handsome, brave, and merry; he strives for fairness and justice at all times and is a devoted King. For his love of the sea, he is known as Caspian the Seafarer.

=== Prince Caspian ===
Lewis introduces Caspian as the young nephew of and heir to King Miraz of Narnia. By this time 1288 years have passed since the rule of High King Peter and his siblings, and Old Narnians no longer live openly in Narnia, having been driven into hiding 305 years earlier by Caspian's ancestors, the Telmarines. In fact, the talking beasts are widely believed to be mythical by the human population, and stories of them are forbidden in Miraz's castle.

When Caspian is a small boy (by which time both of his parents are dead), his nurse tells him of these stories, which fascinate him; but when he mentions them in the presence of his uncle, Miraz rebukes Caspian and dismisses the nurse.

Miraz appoints Doctor Cornelius Caspian's tutor. Cornelius has dwarfish as well as human blood, though Miraz does not know this. Cornelius teaches Caspian the sciences and history that his uncle prescribes, but also tells him secretly the true stories of Narnia's past.

Cornelius tells Caspian that Miraz murdered Caspian IX, Caspian's father and Miraz's elder brother, to take the throne for himself. Although a childless Miraz never cared much for Prince Caspian, he was willing that Caspian should succeed him as king, as he would rather Caspian inherit the throne than a stranger.

When Miraz's wife Prunaprismia gives birth to a son, this situation changes overnight. Cornelius urges the 13-year-old Caspian to flee for his life, for Miraz will certainly perceive Caspian as his son's rival for the throne. Cornelius gives Caspian Queen Susan's magic horn, which will bring help to whoever blows it. Caspian flees and meets creatures he once thought mythical, and the Old Narnians accept him as king.

When Miraz attacks, Caspian blows the horn, and the kings and queens of old – Peter, Susan, Edmund, and Lucy – are pulled back into Narnia. With Aslan's help, they defeat Miraz in what Lewis called the "War of Deliverance" and restore old Narnia. Despite his Telmarine bloodline, Caspian is named the rightful heir by Aslan himself, for he is a member of Adam's race from Earth and proved ready to self-sacrifice for beings not of his people. He becomes King Caspian X.

=== The Voyage of the Dawn Treader ===
In the first three years of his reign, King Caspian X wins several decisive victories over the Giants of the North. Caspian, in his own words, "gave those troublesome giants on the frontier such a good beating last summer that they pay us tribute now."

The titular voyage of the novel takes place exactly three years after Prince Caspian. Order has been re-established in Narnia, and Caspian has constructed the ship Dawn Treader to sail the eastern seas in search of the seven Telmarine lords who had remained loyal to his father and were sent away by Miraz.

On the way to the Lone Islands, the sailors discover Edmund, Lucy, and their cousin Eustace in the water. They have been magically transported to the Narnian world, and help Caspian and the ship's crew sail east towards the end of the world to find the missing lords. When they reach the end of the world, the mouse Reepicheep (who had fought to liberate Narnia in Prince Caspian) goes on to Aslan's Country, described as a blissful paradise. During the voyage, Caspian meets the unnamed daughter of the retired star Ramandu. They marry and have a son, Rilian.

=== The Silver Chair ===
In this novel, 50 years later, Caspian is an ailing elderly man. A decade earlier, his wife died of a serpent's bite, and their son Rilian rode to exact revenge but disappeared.

Eustace and his school friend Jill Pole arrive in Narnia while fleeing a gang of bullies at their school, Experiment House. They arrive to witness the aged Caspian set off to sea. He had told his people that he wanted to revisit the places of his youth, but many believe that Caspian fears his son is lost forever and has gone on the voyage to seek Aslan to ask who could be the next king of Narnia. Meanwhile, Eustace and Jill rescue the lost Prince from the underworld where he had been held captive by his mother's murderer, the shapeshifting Lady of the Green Kirtle. Caspian returns to Narnia in time to meet his son before dying outside Cair Paravel, in the company of his son and many of his closest followers. After his death, Caspian is rejuvenated by Aslan in Aslan's Country, and he accompanies Eustace and Jill back to their world for a short time, where they deal with the Experiment House bullies.

=== The Last Battle ===
Caspian makes a very brief appearance with his wife and son Rilian at the end of this novel, the final book in the Narnia series. He is present with all the other major characters who reappear in Aslan's Country at the end of the Narnian world.

== Portrayals ==
In the 1989 television serial of Prince Caspian produced by the BBC, the teenaged Caspian was played by Jean Marc Perret. In the Voyage of the Dawn Treader (also 1989), the slightly older Caspian was played by Samuel West, and in The Silver Chair the aged Caspian is played by Geoffrey Russell (and the rejuvenated Caspian by Jean Marc Perret).

In Walden Media's 2008 release of The Chronicles of Narnia: Prince Caspian, the character is portrayed by English actor Ben Barnes. In this version, the Telmarines are of Spanish descent so Caspian is portrayed with a Mediterranean accent, dark hair and dark eyes; he is older than he is in the book as he is already coming of age and is wrestling with his youthful desire for revenge against Miraz. The film also introduces an incipient attraction between Caspian and Queen Susan; before she returns to her own world for the last time, Susan gives Caspian a farewell kiss.

Caspian is again portrayed by Barnes in Walden's sequel, The Chronicles of Narnia: The Voyage of the Dawn Treader, this time with a beard to show that time has passed and the Mediterranean accent has been changed to Barnes' natural English accent. Now in his early twenties, Caspian has grown and matured into a wise young man and is on a voyage to find the seven lost lords of Narnia that were banished by his uncle. During the voyage, he is tempted by an evil green mist of Dark Island, which appears to him as his greatest fear: that his father feels nothing but disappointment in him. After defeating the evil, he is offered the chance to travel to Aslan's Country to find his father, but chooses to stay in Narnia and continue his reign as King.

== Notes ==
Regnal titles
| Preceded by Miraz | King of Narnia; Anno Mundi Narniae 2303-2356 | Succeeded by Rilian I |
