= Ramandu =

- Narnia character
- Ramandu, as portrayed by Geoffrey Bayldon in the BBC serial Prince Caspian and the Voyage of the Dawn Treader

In-universe information
- Race: Star
- Family: Caspian X (son-in-law); Rilian (grandson); Erlian (direct descendant); Tirian (direct descendant)
- Children: Lilliandil
- Nationality: Aslan's Table

Ramandu is a fictional character in C. S. Lewis's The Voyage of the Dawn Treader, part of the series The Chronicles of Narnia.

== About ==
He appears as an old man with a silver beard that comes down to his bare feet, dressed in a robe that appears to be made "from the fleece of silver sheep". Once a star, he grew too old and descended to the island at the beginning of the end of the world where he lived for some time with his unnamed daughter (of uncertain parentage, but later the wife of Caspian X and Queen of Narnia). Each morning they would emerge from their home to sing a song during the length of dawn, perhaps causing the sun to rise. Then, a mass of white birds would fly out from "the valleys of the sun" and settle all over the island. One bird would carry a fire-berry, which it would place in Ramandu's mouth. Each time Ramandu ate a fire-berry he would grow younger, until he was an infant, when he was to become a star again.

== Ramandu's Island ==
Ramandu's Island was the last island before the end of the world. The geography of the island was one of gentle hills, not with steep slopes, but instead "with slopes like pillows" (Lewis 1952). A pleasant "purple" smell came forth from the island. The island had many capes and points. The bay in which the Dawn Treader anchored was wide and shallow; at the head of that bay was a level valley, which had a heather-like ground covering. In the valley, there was a wide oblong ruin with columns and no roof.
