= Aslan =

Fictional lion in The Chronicles of Narnia

- Narnia character
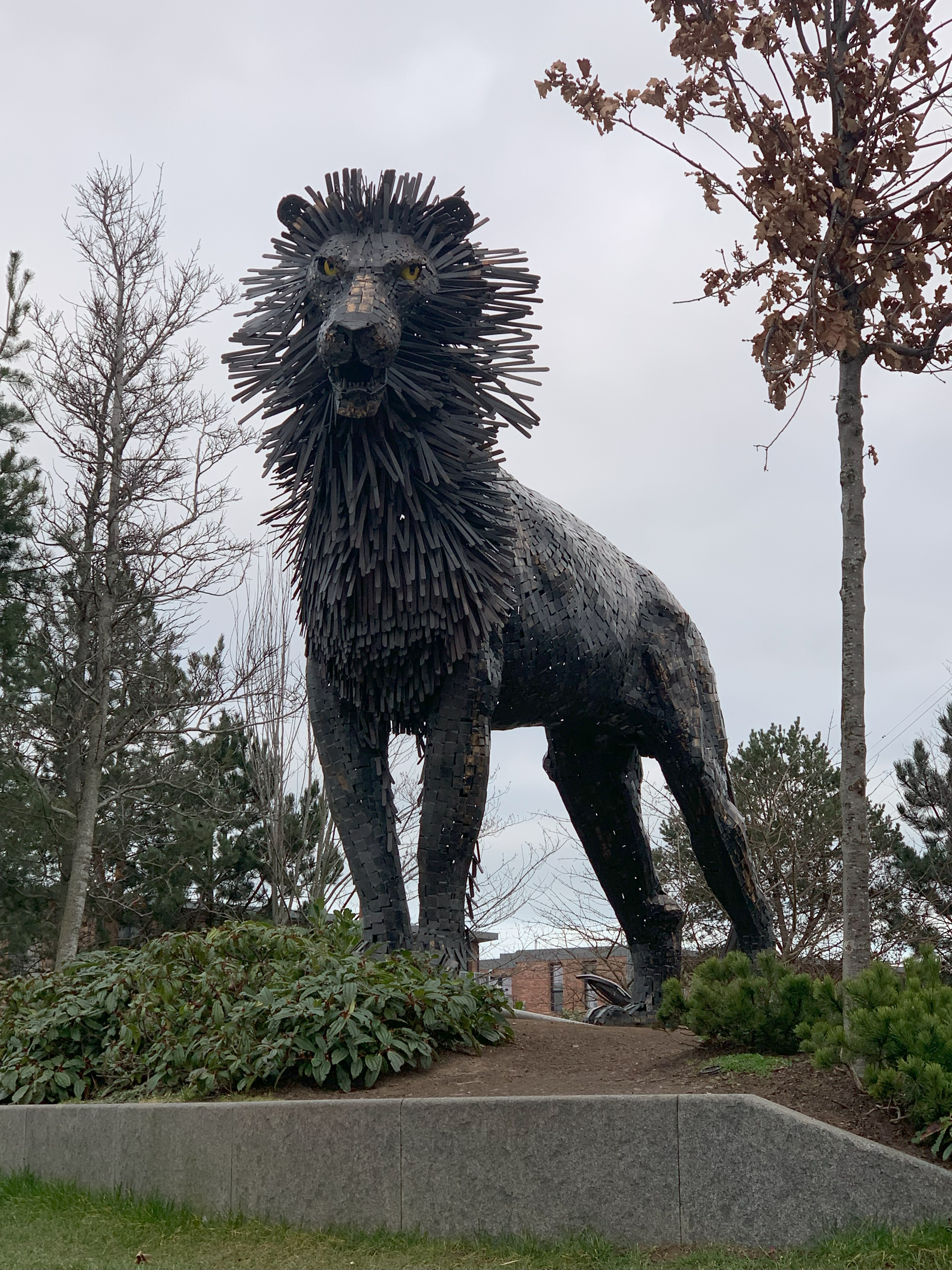
- Aslan the lion (by Maurice Harron (2016), CS Lewis Square, Belfast).
- First appearance: The Lion, the Witch and the Wardrobe (1950)
- Last appearance: The Last Battle (1956)
- Created by: C. S. Lewis
- Voiced by: Liam Neeson others, see Adaptations

In-universe information
- Species: Talking Lion / Deity
- Gender: Male
- Family: Emperor-Over-the-Sea (father)
- Nationality: Aslan's Country

Aslan (Note: Pronunciation: /ˈæslæn, ˈæz-/) is a central character in C. S. Lewis's The Chronicles of Narnia fantasy novel series. He is the only character to appear in all seven books. Aslan is depicted as a talking lion and is described as the King of Beasts, the son of the Emperor-Over-the-Sea, and the King above all High Kings in Narnia.

C. S. Lewis often capitalises the word lion in reference to Aslan since he parallels Jesus as the "Lion of Judah" in Christian theology. The word aslan means "lion" in Turkish.

== Role in The Chronicles of Narnia ==
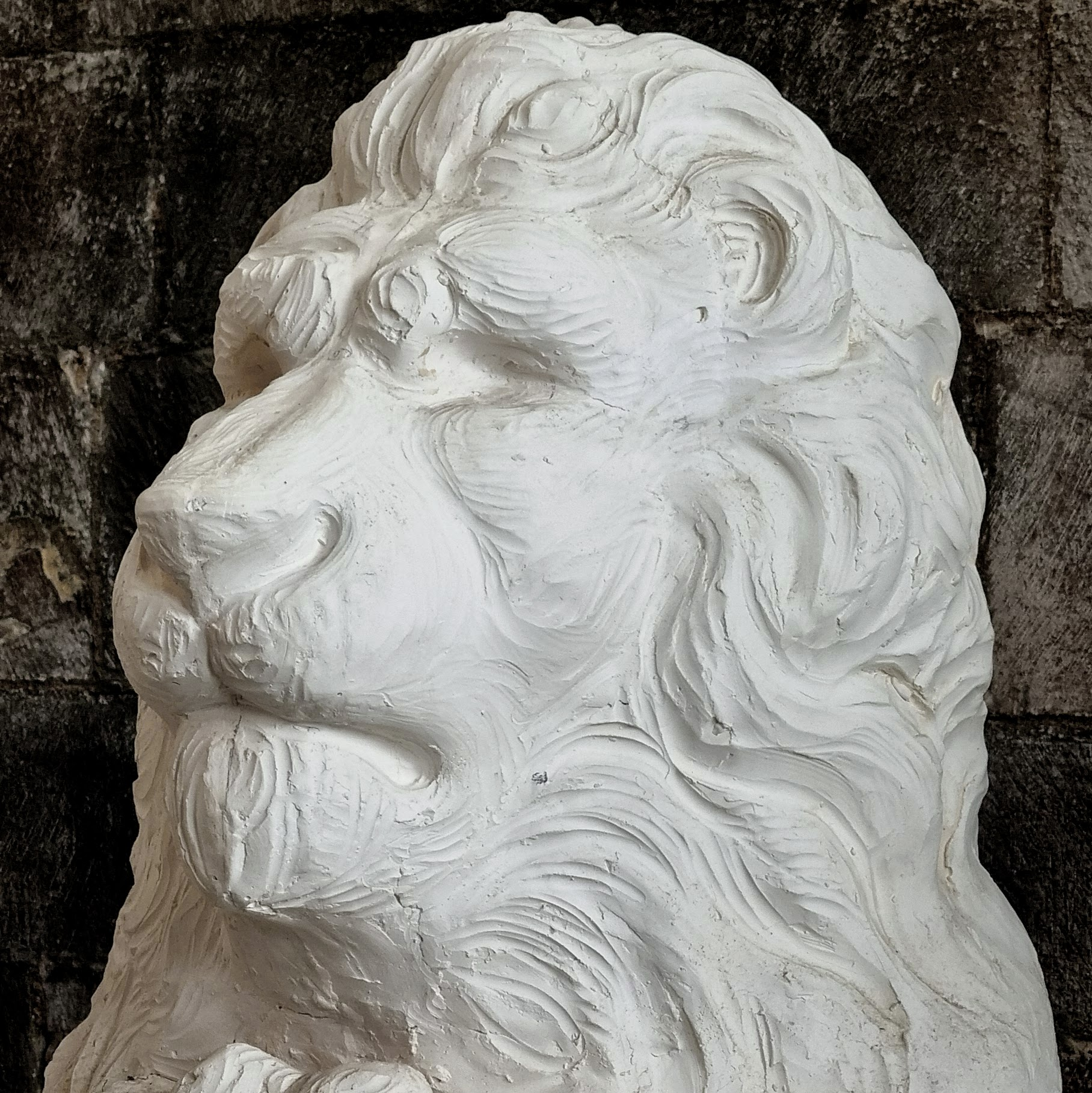
Carving of Aslan by Kibby Schaefer at St Mary's Church, Beverley

=== The Lion, the Witch, and the Wardrobe ===
Aslan is first mentioned in The Lion, the Witch, and the Wardrobe by Mr. Beaver when the Pevensie children arrive in Narnia. He is described by Mr. Beaver as being the true king of Narnia who has returned to help the Pevensies free Narnia of the White Witch's rule.

Mr and Mrs. Beaver guide Peter, Susan and Lucy to the stone table to meet Aslan. They inform Aslan that Edmund has betrayed them by joining the White Witch. Aslan sends some of his followers to rescue Edmund. The next day, Aslan is approached by the White Witch who demands her right to kill Edmund, as the deep magic states that all traitors belong to her or else Narnia will be destroyed. Aslan discusses the matter in private with the Witch, persuading her to release Edmund.

That same night, Aslan travels to the stone table with Susan and Lucy. The Witch and her followers bind Aslan to the stone table – it is revealed that Aslan had agreed to be killed to save Edmund. However, due to a deeper magic (of which the Witch was unaware), the table cracked and Aslan is brought back to life. He then manages to rescue his followers who have been turned to stone by the Witch. He brings his followers to the battle where he kills the Witch himself, ending her tyranny once and for all.

Aslan is present at the coronation of the four Pevensie children. He then leaves to attend to other duties with Mr. Beaver convincing the Pevensie children that he will be coming and going.

=== Prince Caspian ===
The Pevensies are summoned into Narnia from their world to help Caspian – the rightful King of Narnia – overthrow his usurping Uncle Miraz and restore freedom to the land. When they get lost in the forest, Aslan calls Lucy to lead her siblings to him; some obey more faithfully than others. Aslan helps Peter, Edmund, and Trumpkin the Dwarf to come to Caspian's aid in time to thwart an attempt on his life. Aslan then leads an army of awakened Trees and Maenads to victory against Miraz's Telmarine occupation. He later crowns Caspian as King and creates a door whereby surviving Telmarines can leave the Narnian world if they so choose.

=== The Voyage of the Dawn Treader ===
Edmund and Lucy Pevensie are transported to the eastern ocean of the Narnian world along with their cousin, the recalcitrant Eustace, where they join King Caspian on a seafaring journey. When Eustace falls under an enchantment and becomes a dragon, Aslan delivers him from the enchantment. Aslan appears at various points of the journey to provide guidance. When they reach the world's end, Aslan appears as a lamb before returning to his usual form. He shows Reepicheep (a talking mouse) the way to Aslan's Country.

=== The Silver Chair ===
Aslan brings Eustace and his classmate Jill to Narnia. He explains to Jill that she and Eustace are charged with the quest of finding King Caspian's son, Prince Rilian (who had disappeared years before), and gives her four Signs to guide them on their quest. Aslan makes no further appearances until the end of the story, but his Signs prove central to the successful quest. When he returns Eustace and Jill to their world, Aslan shows himself to the bullies at their school to frighten them.

=== The Horse and his Boy ===
Aslan's influence is at first hidden from the characters. Prior to the story's opening, he delivered the infant Prince Cor of Archenland from his enemies to a Calormene fisherman who named him Shasta. At one point in the book, Aslan – pretending to be a common "witless" lion – chases Shasta and the talking horse Bree so that they will meet Aravis and Hwin, who become their traveling companions. He comforts Shasta in the form of a cat and defends him as he sleeps; later, he chases Shasta and the others so that they will reach Archenland in time to warn that nation of the impending attack of Prince Rabadash of Calormen. After Rabadash is defeated, Aslan turns him into a donkey as punishment.

=== The Magician's Nephew ===
This book tells the story of Aslan's creation of Narnia, his crowning of its first King and Queen, and his gift of the power of speech to some of the animals. Aslan tells the two main characters – Digory Kirke and Polly Plummer – that the evil Jadis (later to become the White Witch) will pose a great threat to the Narnians. Aslan charges Digory and Polly with a quest to acquire a magic apple that, when planted, will protect Narnia from Jadis.

=== The Last Battle ===
Though Shift the Ape and the other villains act in his name (dressing the naïve donkey Puzzle in a lion-skin), Aslan himself only appears late in the story in a paradise entered through a stable door. He brings Narnia to an end, and leads into his own country such of its inhabitants who, coming to the Stable Door as the world ends, look into his face and love him, some to their own surprise. At the end of the book, he informs the other characters that "all of you are – as you used to call it in the Shadowlands – dead", and that the afterlife in which they now find themselves is the true reality as they go "further up and further in".

== Influences ==
=== Christian interpretation ===
Although Aslan can be read as an original character, parallels exist with Jesus. According to the author, Aslan is not an allegorical portrayal of Christ, but rather a suppositional incarnation of Christ himself:

If Aslan represented the immaterial Deity, he would be an allegorical figure. In reality however, he is an invention giving an imaginary answer to the question, "What might Christ become like if there really were a world like Narnia and He chose to be incarnate and die and rise again in that world as He actually has done in ours?" This is not allegory at all.

In one of his last letters, Lewis wrote:

Since Narnia is a world of Talking Beasts, I thought He [Christ] would become a Talking Beast there, as He became a man here. I pictured Him becoming a lion there because (a) the lion is supposed to be the king of beasts; (b) Christ is called "The Lion of Judah" in the Bible; (c) I'd been having strange dreams about lions when I began writing the work.

The similarity between the death and resurrection of Aslan and the death and resurrection of Jesus is obvious; one author has observed that like Jesus, Aslan was ridiculed before his death, mourned, and then discovered to be absent from the place where his body had been laid. In this interpretation, the girls Susan and Lucy who witness Aslan's death, mourn him and witness his resurrection would stand for The Three Marys of Christian tradition.

Aslan's words to the Calormene in The Last Battle ("I take to me the services which thou hast done to [the false god Tash]... if any man swear by [him] and keep his oath for the oath's sake, it is by [Aslan] that he has truly sworn, though he know it not, and it is I who reward him"), ratifying the good deeds the latter did even in service to a false god, have been the subject of controversy because they implicitly endorse inclusivism.

== Adaptations ==
Aslan in the 2005 film The Chronicles of Narnia: The Lion, the Witch and the Wardrobe

In the 1967 TV serial, Aslan was portrayed by Bernard Kay.

In the 1979 animated film, Aslan was voiced by Stephen Thorne, who later voiced Aslan in all seven of the BBC Radio 4 Tales of Narnia series.

In the BBC television adaptations of The Chronicles of Narnia, Aslan was performed by Ailsa Berk and William Todd-Jones and voiced by Ronald Pickup.

In the Focus on the Family Radio Theatre dramatisations, Aslan was portrayed by David Suchet.

In the 2005 film The Chronicles of Narnia: The Lion, the Witch and the Wardrobe directed by Andrew Adamson, Aslan was a CGI character voiced by Liam Neeson. Neeson also voiced Aslan in the sequel, Prince Caspian in 2008, and in the third film in the series, The Voyage of the Dawn Treader in 2010, directed by Michael Apted.

For the 2027 Netflix adaptation Narnia: The Magician's Nephew directed by Greta Gerwig, Meryl Streep has been cast as the voice of Aslan.

== Commemoration ==
In 2011, Aslan was one of eight British magical figures, which included characters from Arthurian legend, Harry Potter, and Discworld, commemorated on a series of UK postage stamps issued by the Royal Mail.
