= List of barefooters =

People who are known for going barefoot

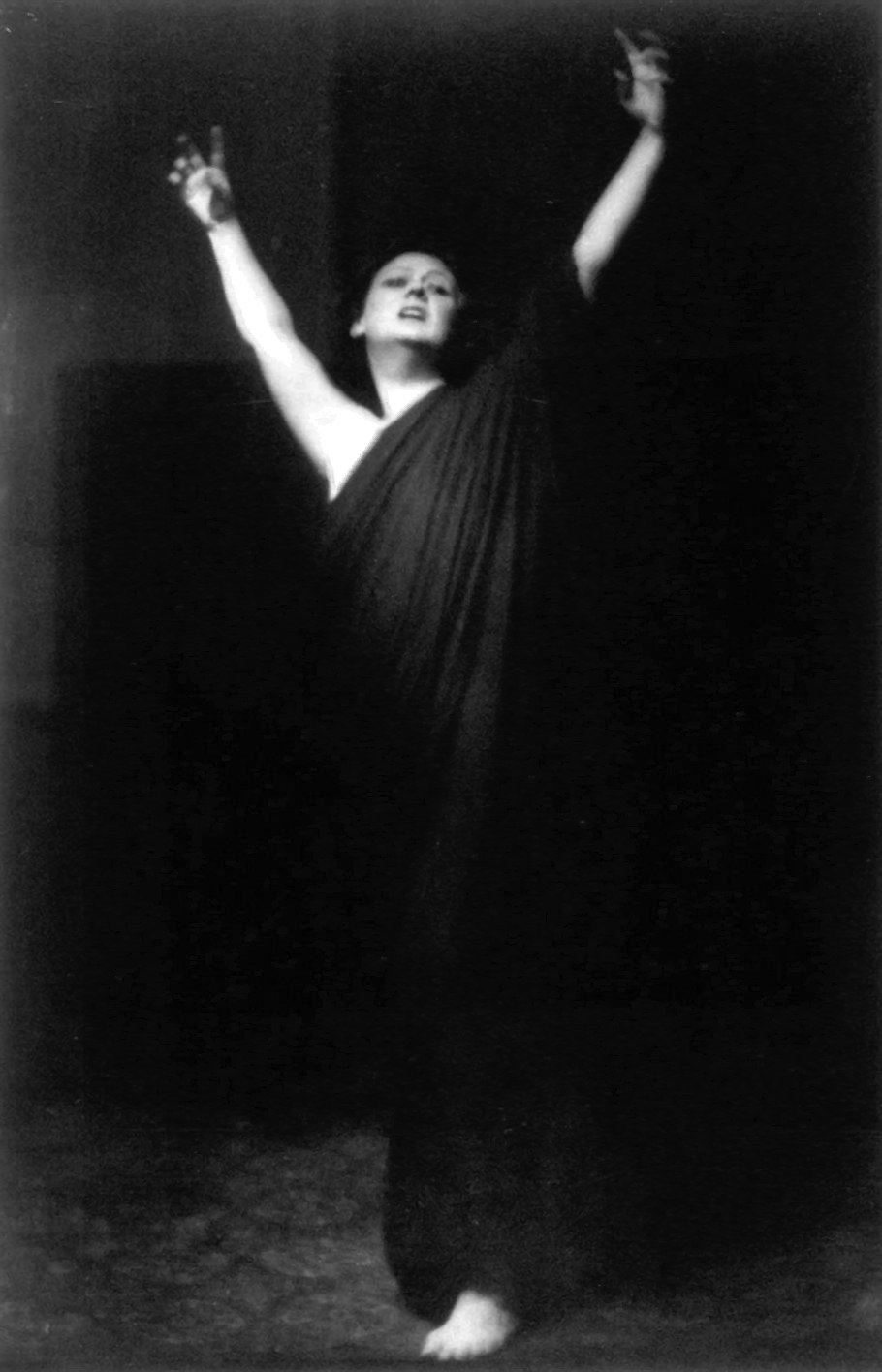
Isadora Duncan performing barefoot during her 1915–1918 American tour

This is a list of notable barefooters, real and fictional; notable people who are known for going barefoot as a part of their public image, and whose barefoot appearance was consistently reported by media or other reliable sources, or depicted in works of fiction dedicated to them.

A barefoot appearance can be a notable characteristic for an individual, as it has been associated with various cultural contexts throughout human history. In Ancient Greece, philosophers like Socrates and Diogenes adopted a barefoot lifestyle, and since the Middle Ages, it was seen as a sign of religious ascetism. In particular, discalceation, the practice of going constantly barefoot or clad only in sandals, is a common feature of Christian mendicant orders, practiced by the Discalced Carmelites (1568), the Feuillant Cistercians (1575), the Trinitarians (1594), the Mercedarians (1604), the Passionists, the Poor Clares and Colettine Poor Clares, and the Descalzas Reales. This is undertaken as part of vows of poverty and humility, as well as a remembrance of Moses on Mount Sinai. Hindu gurus go barefoot to allow their followers to demonstrate their love and respect by pranam, the ceremonial touching of a bare foot. It is also customary in Judaism and some Christian denominations to go barefoot while mourning.

The early 20th century saw the emergence of the barefoot dance movement, pioneered by Isadora Duncan, that anticipated the women's liberation movement and challenged the then prevalent perception of a barefoot appearance as being obscene. In the latter half of the 20th century, many singers, primarily women, have performed barefoot, a tendency that continues in the early 21st century.

Since the 1960s, barefooting has also been associated with counterculture, in particular with the hippie and New Age movements. A July 1967 Time magazine study on hippie philosophy credited the foundation of the hippie movement with historical precedent dating back to the aforementioned religious and spiritual figures of the ancient times, including Diogenes and the sadhu of India.

Following the example of Steve Jobs (who was influenced by the hippie movement), barefooting became a trend in American corporate culture. A number of entrepreneurs maintain a casual public image and appear barefoot or wearing sandals even on formal occasions.

Nowadays people who have a preference for not wearing shoes in public are striving for the recognition of a barefoot lifestyle, against the social stigma associated with barefooting, and for the abolition of laws and regulations that prohibit going barefoot in certain places. In particular, in the 2020s, it became a trend among various celebrities to appear barefoot in public, a tendency reinforced by TikTok.

== Notable barefooters ==
=== Religion, spirituality, and philosophy ===
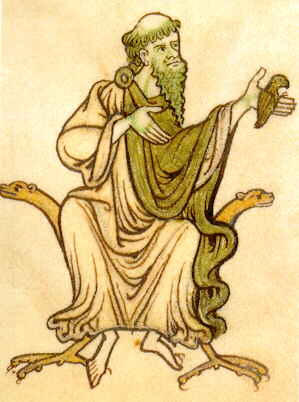
Saint Kevin of Glendalough, depicted barefoot with a blackbird in his hand in a miniature of an Irish codex, ca. 9th or 10th cent.

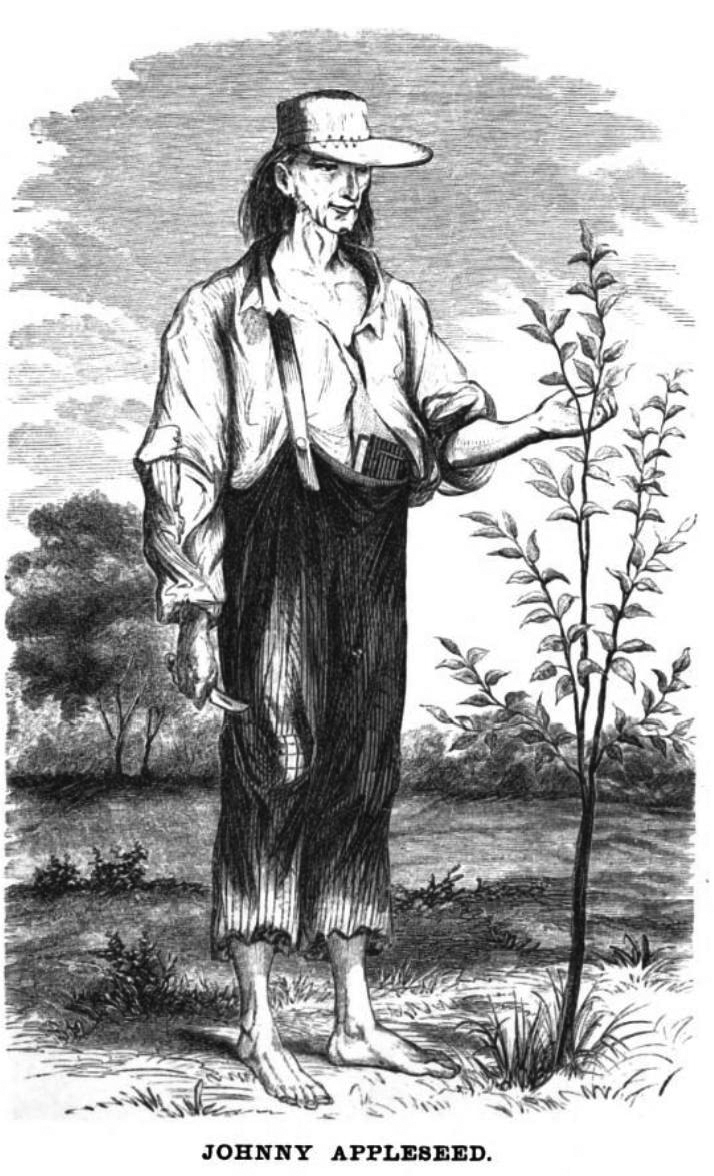
Johnny Appleseed, as depicted in an illustration to A History of the Pioneer and Modern Times of Ashland County (1862)

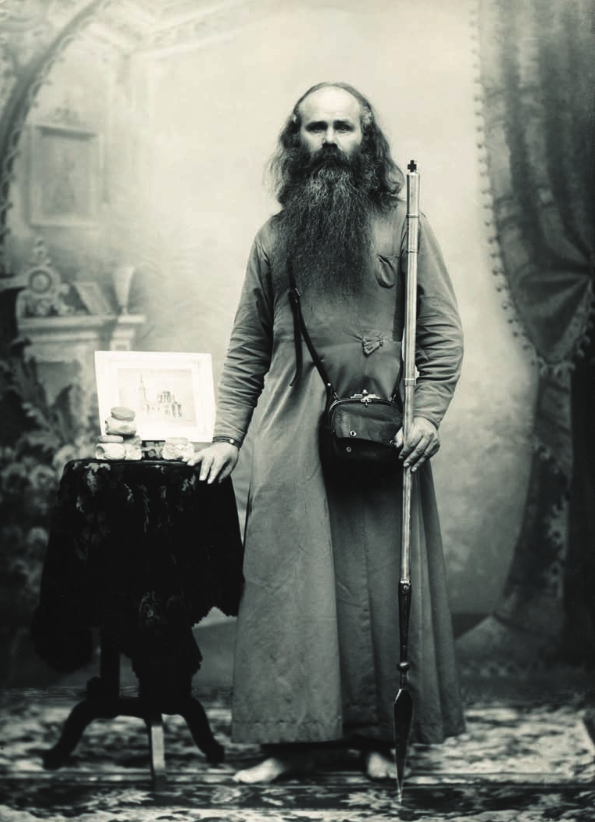
Vasily the Barefoot with the project of a new temple in the village of Nadezhda.

- Socrates (470–399 BC) – Ancient Greek philosopher credited as the founder of Western philosophy. In Symposium, Plato mentioned that Socrates went barefoot all year round, even on ice; Aristophanes also made a reference to Socrates going barefoot in his comedy The Clouds. He is frequently alluded to as "the barefoot philosopher" in academic works, and a television film dedicated to his last days was called Barefoot in Athens.
- Diogenes (412 or 404–323 BC) – Ancient Greek philosopher known as one of the founders of Cynicism. Diogenes and his followers (called cynics) were known to neglect all personal comfort and go barefoot even in winter.
- Origen (c. 185 to 253 AD) – early Christian scholar, ascetic, and theologian who adopted the ascetic lifestyle of the Greek Sophists, going barefoot and only owning one cloak.
- Hypatia (c. 350 to 370–415 AD) – Ancient Greek Neoplatonist philosopher, astronomer, and mathematician. She had a habit of going barefoot that was depicted in the movie Agora.
- Bishr the Barefoot (767–841) – Muslim saint who earned the name Bishr al-Ḥāfī (Bishr the Barefoot). When asked why he did not wear shoes, he would reply "My master Allah guided me when I was barefooted, and I will remain in this condition till death".
- Numerous Catholic saints have gone barefoot as an ascetic practice, either out of their own volition or due to being part of a monastic order where the rule recommends or mandates being barefoot. Examples of such saints include Kevin of Glendalough (498–618), who in addition to being barefoot would only wear animal skins, Hedwig of Silesia (1174–1243), who according to legend went barefoot even in winter, Francis of Assisi (1181–1226) and Clare of Assisi (1194–1253), founders of the first Discalced religious orders, and Margaret the Barefooted (1325–1395). In Eastern Orthodoxy, John of Shanghai and San Francisco (1896–1966), a prominent ascetic, prelate of the Russian Orthodox Church Outside Russia, and reputed wonderworker, became known as "Saint Jean Nus Pieds" (Saint John the Barefoot) in French discourse because he was known to go barefoot all year round.
- Johnny Appleseed (1774–1845) – American pioneer nurseryman and missionary for The New Church, known for his barefoot appearance. According to his obituary in Fort Wayne Sentinel, "in the most inclement weather he might be seen barefooted and almost naked except when he chanced to pick up articles of old clothing".
- Paraskeva Diveyevskaya (between 1795 and 1807–1915) – Russian fool for Christ and wanderer who became widely known at the turn of the 19th and 20th centuries. She was known to go barefoot all year long.
- Matrona the Barefoot (1833–1911) – blessed Russian wanderer of the late 19th and early 20th centuries.
- Anthony the Wanderer (c. 1834–after 1911) – Russian wanderer, widely known in Russia during the reigns of Emperors Alexander II, Alexander III and Nicholas II. Regardless of the season, he went barefoot on his wanderings.
- Vasily the Barefoot (between 1856 and 1858–1933) – Russian wanderer of the late 19th and early 20th centuries. He gained great popularity among his contemporaries through his charitable practice, his campaign against alcoholism and profanity, and the construction of a temple in his native village, for which he raised funds during his travels throughout the Russian Empire.
- Mahatma Gandhi (1869–1948) – Indian spiritual and political leader who employed nonviolent resistance to lead the successful campaign for India's independence from British rule. He was normally barefoot during his public appearances.
- Daniil Andreyev (1906–1959) – Russian writer, poet, and Christian mystic, known as the author of the Rose of the World. He often appeared barefoot in public, and promoted barefooting as a spiritual practice in his writings.
- Krishna Venta (1911–1958) – American occult leader and the founder of the Fountain of the World religious group. He and members of his group drew attention in the press for uniformly dressing in robes, going barefoot, and requiring the male members to grow beards and wear their hair long.

=== Arts and entertainment ===
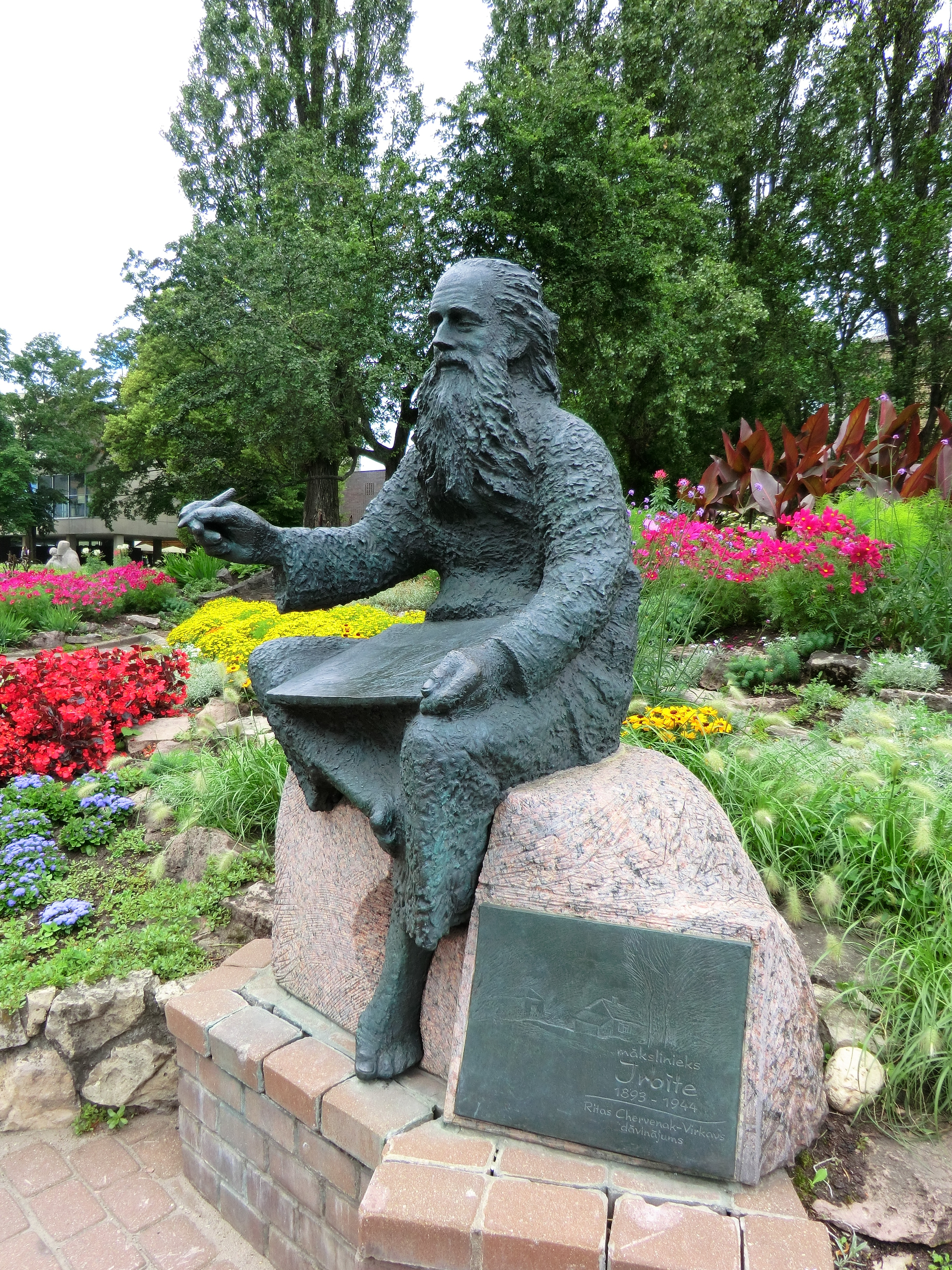
Statue of Voldemārs Irbe in Riga, depicted disheveled and barefoot in accordance with his real-life appearance as 'Barefoot Irbite'

- Voldemārs Irbe (1893–1944) – Latvian pastel painter renowned for his eccentricity, disheveled appearance, and going barefoot all year round. This penchant earned him the nickname "Barefoot Irbite"; a monument in Riga dedicated to Irbe also depicts him barefooted.
- Peter Jackson (b. 1961) – New Zealand filmmaker best known as the director, writer, and producer of the Lord of the Rings trilogy (2001–2003) and the Hobbit trilogy (2012–2014). He frequently appears barefoot in public, and has stated in an interview that "normally I don't wear shoes. They're just uncomfortable". He was also credited with "establishing New Zealand’s global barefoot reputation".
- Rick Rubin (b. 1963) – American record producer. Rubin is a practitioner of Buddhism and meditation, and has a preference for going barefoot for spiritual reasons. This habit earned him the nickname "barefoot sage".
- Genevieve Gorder (b. 1974) – American television host and interior designer widely known for her habit of working barefoot. She parodied her lack of footwear in a series of Swiffer sweeper commercials that started running on television and in periodicals in 2003.

==== Barefoot dancers ====
Barefoot dancing rose to prominence in the late 19th and early 20th centuries with the emergence of free dance and modern dance. While many barefoot dancers belong to these movements, barefoot dancing is the norm in certain cultures and dance forms. For example, Indian classical dancers often go barefoot as a form of respect for the Earth.

- Isadora Duncan (1878–1927) – American-born dancer and choreographer, who was a pioneer of modern contemporary dance and, in particular, revolutionized dance by performing barefoot. She divorced the bare foot from perceptions of obscenity and made a conscious effort to link barefoot dancing to ideals such as "nudity, childhood, the idyllic past, flowing lines, health, nobility, ease, freedom, simplicity, order, and harmony".

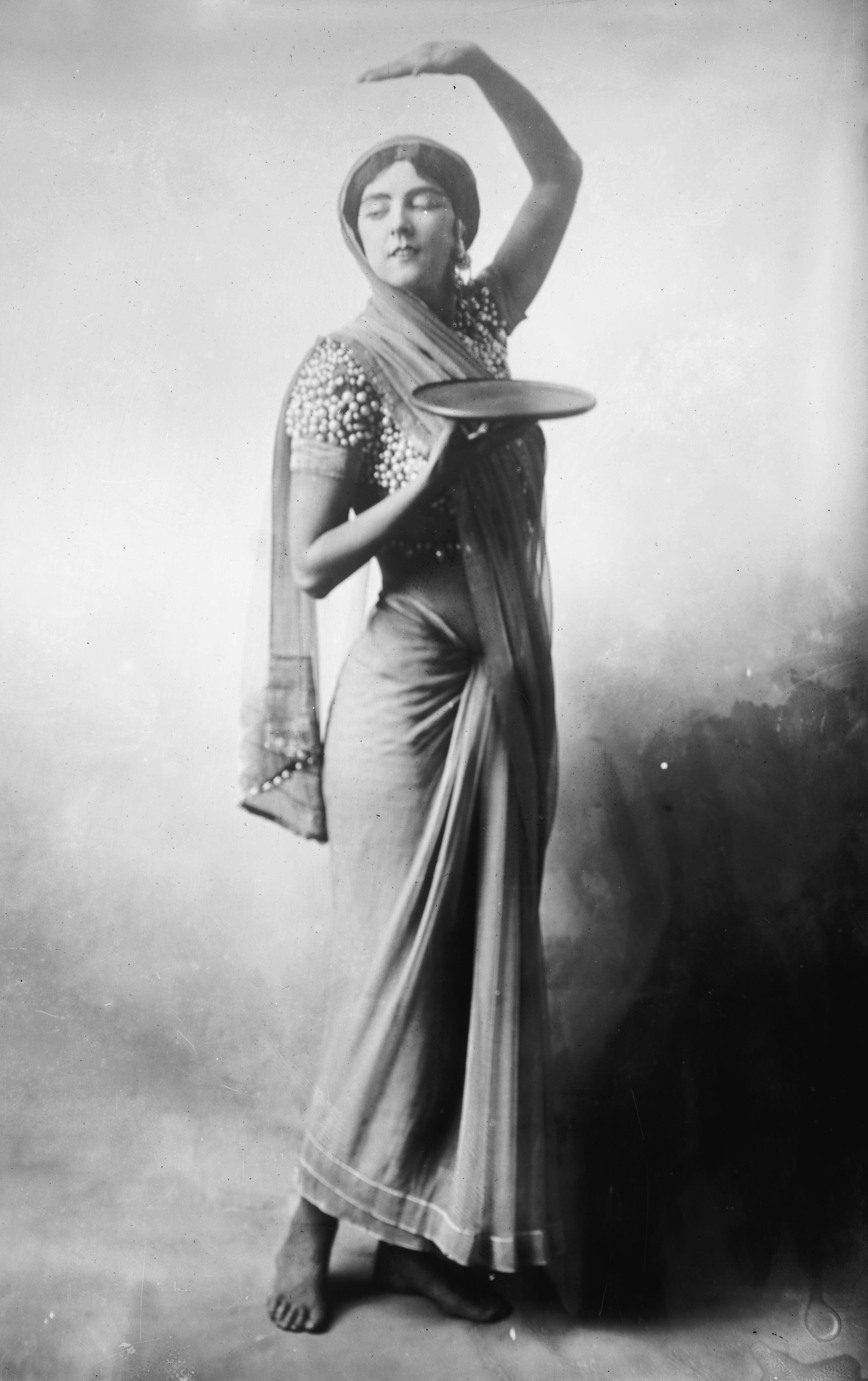
Ruth St. Denis

- Ruth St. Denis (1879–1968) – American pioneer of modern dance who introduced ideas from Eastern mysticism into the art, and, in particular, the idea of barefoot dancing.
- Carmen Tórtola Valencia (1882–1955) – Spanish early modern dancer, choreographer, costume designer and painter, who generally performed barefoot. Tórtola Valencia is said to have been the inspiration for Rubén Darío's poem, La bailarina de los pies desnudos ("The Barefoot Dancer").

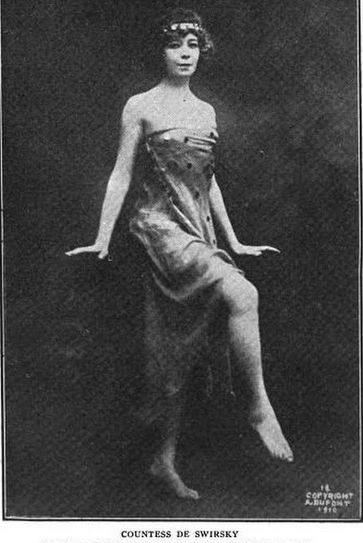
Thamara de Swirsky, from a 1910 publication

- Thamara de Swirsky (1888–1961) – Russian-born dancer who "created a sensation" in the United States with her barefoot dancing.
- Ted Shawn (1891–1972) – American dancer and choreographer who was the husband and dancing partner of Ruth St. Denis, also renowned for performing barefoot.
- Martha Graham (1894–1991) – American modern dancer, teacher and choreographer responsible for creating the Graham technique, and one of the pioneers of barefoot dancing.
- José Limón (1908–1972) – dancer and choreographer from Mexico who developed what is now known as "Limón technique", and who normally danced barefoot.
- Pearl Primus (1919–1994) – American dancer, choreographer and anthropologist. Primus played an important role in the presentation of African dance to American audiences, and, in particular, the notion of dancing barefoot.
- Alvin Ailey (1931–1989) – American dancer, director, choreographer, and activist who founded the Alvin Ailey American Dance Theater (AAADT). He frequently danced barefoot.
- La Chunga (1938–2025) – Spanish flamenco dancer and painter of naïf art, known for her barefoot style of flamenco dance and described as "The Barefoot Dancer".

==== Actors and actresses ====
Some actors and actresses have had their barefoot habit incorporated into the characters they portray.

Katharine Hepburn as Pandora in the Bryn Mawr College production of The Woman in the Moon (1928), a role that she insisted on going barefoot for

- Katharine Hepburn (1907–2003) – American actress widely regarded as the greatest in the history of Hollywood. Hepburn had a preference for going barefoot: for her first acting role, in the play The Woman in the Moon, she insisted that her character Pandora should not wear shoes. Offscreen, she usually dressed in slacks and sandals, even for formal occasions, such as television interviews. She said that her preference for wearing trousers was due to her feeling that they permitted her to be barefoot. Hepburn's habit of rehearsing barefoot is mentioned in Zora Mendelsohn's 1950 novel Joan Takes a Bow.
- Maureen O'Hara (1920–2015) – Irish and American actress. O'Hara tended to avoid shoes in her youth and said she liked the sensation of being barefoot. Her barefoot habit is shared by her characters: Esmeralda in the 1939 film The Hunchback of Notre Dame and Mary Kate Danaher in the 1952 film The Quiet Man.

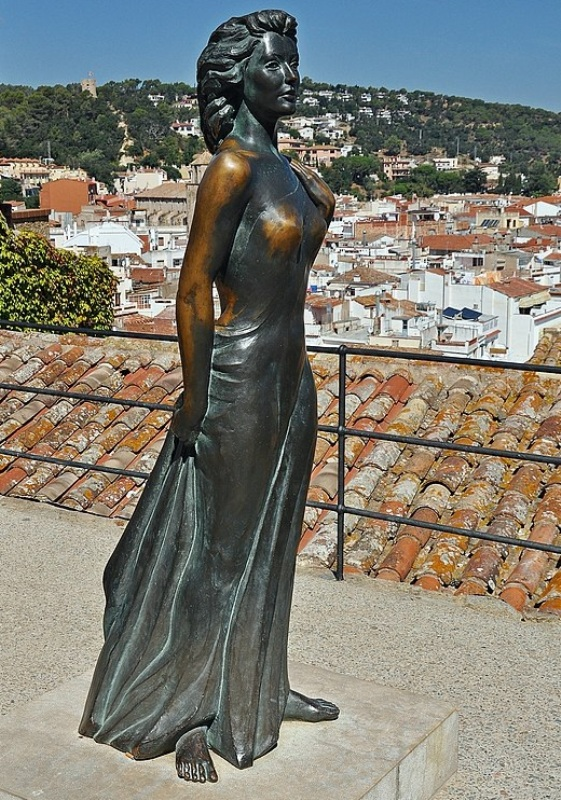
A barefoot statue of Ava Gardner in Tossa de Mar

- Ava Gardner (1922–1990) – American actress who was a part of the Golden Age of Hollywood. Ava had a lifelong habit of going barefoot which influenced her decision to accept the role of Maria Vargas in the film The Barefoot Contessa (1954).
- Bea Arthur (1922–2009) – Jewish American actress, comedian, and singer best known for portraying Maude Findlay in the popular sitcoms All in the Family (1971–1972) and Maude (1972–1978) and Dorothy Zbornak in The Golden Girls (1985–1992). Arthur had a preference for going barefoot, which was shared by her character Dorothy Zbornak. She had a special clause in her The Golden Girls contract that allowed her to walk around the set barefoot, on condition that she would not sue the producers in case of injury.
- Rita Moreno (b. 1931) – Puerto Rican actress, dancer, and singer. Her barefoot habit was frequently incorporated into her film roles; a 1956 article dedicated to her in Photoplay magazine was called "Barefoot Girl with Chic".
- Brigitte Bardot (1934–2025) – French actress, singer, model, and animal rights activist. She had a habit of going barefoot in the streets of Saint-Tropez and Capri, which was also depicted in the 1956 film And God Created Woman, in which she portrayed the main character Juliette Hardy. The movie made her an icon of the 1960s sexual revolution.
- David Carradine (1936–2009) – American actor and director best known for the role of the Shaolin monk Kwai Chang Caine. Carradine had a preference for going barefoot in everyday life, and insisted that Kwai Chang Caine should be barefoot as well. His grave marker refers to him as "The Barefoot Legend".
- Sharon Tate (1943–1969) – American actress and model known for frequently appearing barefoot in public. When she went to restaurants with a "No Shoes, No Service" rule, she would frequently put rubber bands around her ankles to pretend that she was wearing sandals. This trait of hers was depicted in the 2019 film Once Upon a Time in Hollywood, in which she is portrayed by Margot Robbie, who is herself fond of going barefoot.
- Donyale Luna (1945–1979) – American model and actress who was the first Black model to appear on the cover of the British edition of Vogue. She gained the reputation of an eccentric due to her habit of going barefoot in public.
- Julia Roberts (b. 1967) – American actress known for frequently appearing barefoot, including at public events such as film festivals, talk shows, and her wedding to Lyle Lovett. Her barefoot habit was incorporated into a number of her roles, including Tinker Bell in Hook.
- Thomas Jane (b. 1969) – American actor known for his preference for going barefoot, including at film premieres and while on set.
- Elsa Pataky (b. 1976) – Spanish model and actress. Pataky has frequently gone barefoot after moving to Byron Bay, New South Wales with her Australian husband Chris Hemsworth. Hemsworth (b. 1983), an actor, has also been observed in bare feet, as have the couple's children.
- Travis Fimmel (b. 1979) – Australian actor and former model known for his preference for going barefoot, a trait incorporated into his character Anduin Lothar in Warcraft. Fimmel also briefly portrayed Tarzan, a character renowned for his barefoot appearance, in the eponymous 2003 TV series.
- Uğur Rıfat Karlova (b. 1980) – Turkish-Taiwanese stand-up comedian, actor, TV host, showman, and writer who normally performs his live shows barefoot. He explains, "performing barefoot is amazing – it helps me to feel the wooden stage and I really can be part of it."
- Rebecca Ferguson (b. 1983) – Swedish actress best known for her portrayal of the MI6 agent Ilsa Faust in three of the Mission: Impossible films. Ferguson is known for her preference for going barefoot, and incorporated it into her role as Rose the Hat in Doctor Sleep.
- Shailene Woodley (b. 1991) – American actress and environmentalist who frequently appears barefoot in public, and became known as the "Hollywood Hippie".
- Mark Bonanno – member of the Australian comedy troupe Aunty Donna who is often barefoot during the group's stage performances.

==== Musicians performing barefoot ====
The following is a list of musicians who have been known to not wear shoes while carrying out a live performance. This does not necessarily reflect a tendency to go barefoot during their daily lives.

- Rhoda Scott (b. 1938) – American soul jazz organist and singer who was nicknamed "The Barefoot Lady" because she always played her church organ in bare feet.
- Joan Baez (b. 1941) – American singer-songwriter whose tendency to perform barefoot earned her the nickname "barefoot Madonna".

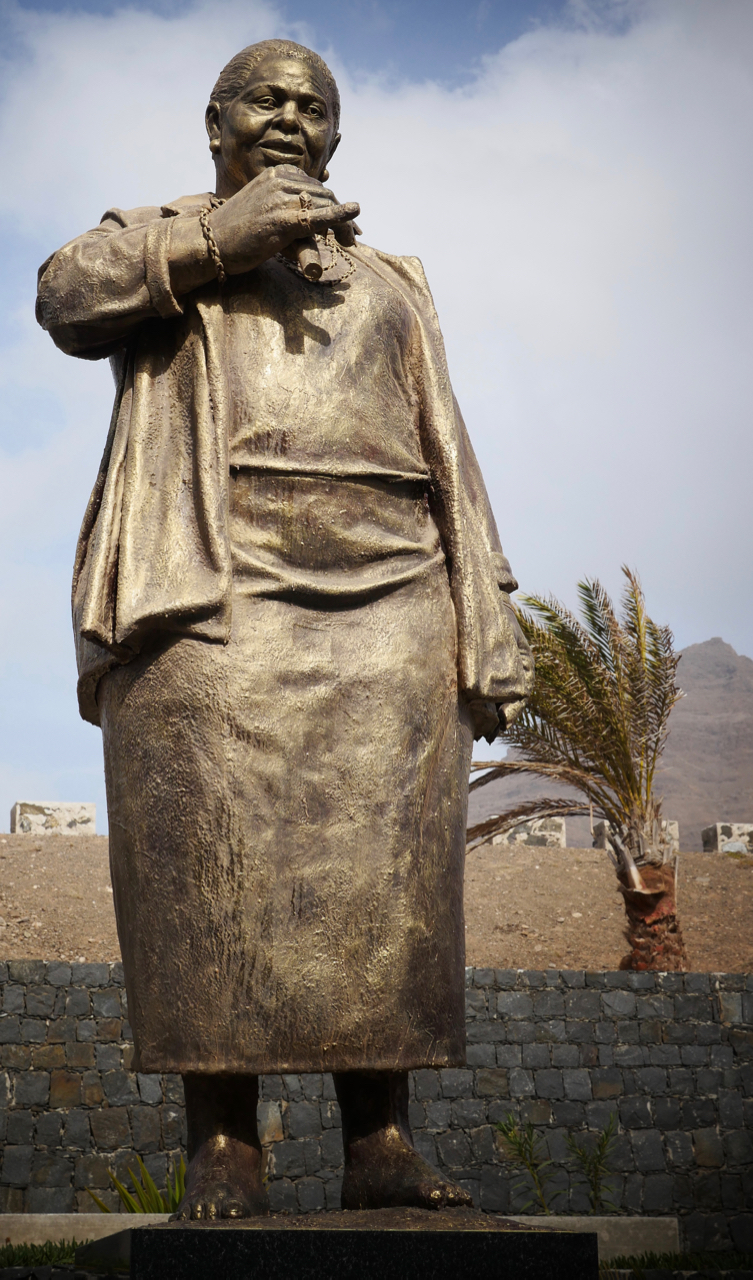
A barefoot sculpture of Cesária Évora at the eponymous airport in Mindelo, Cabo Verde

- Cesária Évora (1941–2011) – Cape Verdean morna singer who became known as the Barefoot Diva because she often performed without shoes, which was sometimes described as a way for Évora to honor the poor.
- Graham Nash (b. 1942) – British and American musician, singer and songwriter renowned for performing barefoot.
- Anne Murray (b. 1945) – Canadian retired country, pop and adult contemporary music singer who frequently performed barefoot.
- Maria Bethânia (b. 1946) – Brazilian singer and songwriter.
- Linda Ronstadt (b. 1946) – American former singer and musician who has performed and recorded in diverse genres including rock, folk, pop, country, and soul.
- Jimmy Buffett (1946–2023) – American singer-songwriter known for his tropical rock sound and persona, which frequently included singing barefoot onstage.
- Sandie Shaw (b. 1947) – British pop singer renowned as one of the first singers to perform barefoot. This earned her the nickname "Barefoot Pop Princess of the 1960s". After she started another career as a psychotherapist, she opened a clinic known as Barefoot Therapy: The Arts Clinic. Shaw became the first of five Eurovision Song Contest winners to perform barefoot, including twice winner Loreen.
- Bob Weir (1947–2026) – American musician and songwriter best known as a founding member of the Grateful Dead. After his death, the California Congress member Jared Huffman delivered a tribute speech in bare feet to honor Weir's own preference for performing barefoot.
- Ronnie Van Zant (1948–1977) – American singer-songwriter and lead vocalist of the southern rock band Lynyrd Skynyrd, renowned for frequently performing barefoot.
- George Winston (1949–2023) – American pianist who frequently played in bare feet, including at the Moscone Center in San Francisco.
- Jaco Pastorius (1951–1987) – American jazz bassist, composer, and producer.
- Yardena Arazi (b. 1951) – Israeli singer and entertainer.
- David Byrne (b. 1952) – American musician, writer, visual artist, and filmmaker, known as the founding member of the new wave band Talking Heads. He normally performs onstage barefoot and wearing a gray suit.
- Mutabaruka (b. 1952) – Jamaican Rastafari dub poet, musician, actor, educator, and talk-show host, who developed two of Jamaica's most popular radio programmes, The Cutting Edge and Steppin' Razor.
- Nicko McBrain (b. 1952) – English musician, best known as the drummer of the heavy metal band Iron Maiden since 1982. McBrain drums barefoot since switching to the DW 5000 Accelerator drum pedal in 2000, stating that it gives him "more freedom."
- Danny Elfman (b. 1953) – American film composer, singer, songwriter, and musician. He came to prominence as the lead vocalist and primary songwriter for the new wave band Oingo Boingo in the early 1980s.
- Rich Mullins (1955–1997) – American contemporary Christian music singer and songwriter best known for his worship songs "Awesome God" and "Sometimes by Step", known for being barefoot during performances and outside of them.
- Belinda Carlisle (b. 1958) – American singer who often performs barefoot on stage.
- Sade (b. 1959) – Nigerian-British singer-songwriter who is the principal songwriter and lead vocalist of the eponymous band.
- Ottmar Liebert (b. 1959) – German guitarist, songwriter and producer best known for his Spanish-influenced music.
- Amy Grant (b. 1960) – American singer-songwriter and musician who performs barefoot as one of her concert trademarks. To date, Grant continues to take off her shoes midway through performances, as she has said, "it is just more comfortable."
- Grant Hart (1961–2017) – American musician, best known as the drummer and co lead vocalist in the punk rock band Hüsker Dü. Hart was tagged by observers as the "hippie" of the group due to his long hair and his propensity to drum with bare feet.
- k.d. lang (b. 1961) – Canadian pop and country singer-songwriter and occasional actress who draws inspiration from Anne Murray, and is also known for performing barefoot.
- Henry Rollins (b. 1961) – American singer, writer, spoken word artist, actor, comedian, and presenter.
- Sheryl Crow (b. 1962) – American musician who is frequently barefoot in her music videos.
- Sass Jordan (1962–2026) – English-born Canadian rock singer.
- Anthony Field (b. 1963) – Australian musician, actor, songwriter and producer best known as the leader of the children's group the Wiggles. He normally performs barefoot.
- Wynonna Judd (b. 1964) – American country music singer who normally performs barefoot because, in her own words, it "grounds me and it allows me to play the guitar better".
- Evelyn Glennie (b. 1965) – Scottish percussionist who has been profoundly deaf since childhood, and regularly plays barefoot during live performances and studio recordings to feel the music.
- Krist Novoselic (b. 1965) – American musician, politician, and activist who co-founded and played bass on every album for the rock band Nirvana.
- Scott Reeder (b. 1965) – American musician best known as the former bass player of stoner rock bands Across the River, Kyuss and The Obsessed, as well as the current bass player for Fireball Ministry.
- Jennifer Finch (1966–2026) – American musician, designer, and photographer most notable for being the primary bass player of the punk rock band L7 who often performed barefoot.
- Michael Franti (b. 1966) – American singer-songwriter who performs barefoot on stage and prefers being barefoot during his daily life and travels.
- Deana Carter (b. 1966) – American country music singer-songwriter.

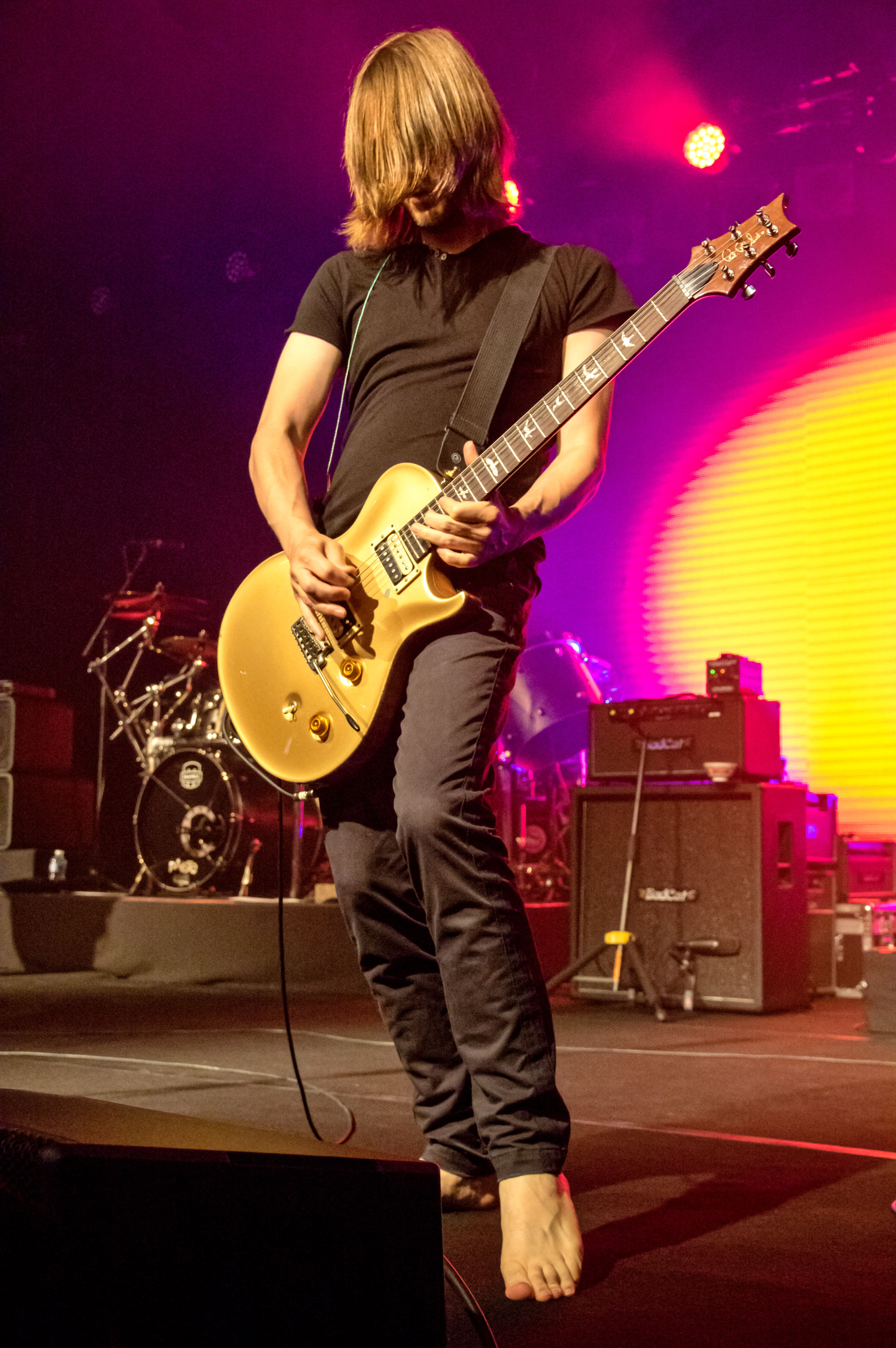
Steven Wilson performing barefoot at a 2016 music festival in Freiburg

- Steven Wilson (b. 1967) – British musician; founder, guitarist, lead vocalist and songwriter of the rock band Porcupine Tree. For live shows, Wilson plays barefoot, a habit that goes back to his early childhood. He said, "I always had a problem wearing shoes and I've always gone around with bare feet."
- Phil Anselmo (b. 1968) – American musician best known as the lead singer for groove metal band Pantera, southern metal supergroup Down, and hardcore band Superjoint, as well as the owner of Housecore Records. He normally performs barefoot due to a back injury he sustained in the mid-1990s.
- Sarah McLachlan (b. 1968) – Canadian singer-songwriter.
- Glen Phillips (b. 1970) – American songwriter, lyricist, singer and guitarist who is the lead singer and songwriter of the alternative rock group Toad the Wet Sprocket. He is known for performing barefoot.
- Dean Ween (b. 1970) – American guitarist, singer and a founding member of the alternative rock group Ween renowned for performing barefoot.
- Keller Williams (b. 1970) – American singer, songwriter and musician who normally performs barefoot.
- Idina Menzel (b. 1971) – American actress, singer and songwriter. Menzel often opts to perform barefoot in concert, which has become a trademark of her live performances, and her 2010 tour was called "Barefoot at the Symphony Tour". Idina Menzel Live: Barefoot at the Symphony was released as a live CD and DVD and aired on PBS in March 2012, with Musical Director Rob Mounsey producing.
- Dolores O'Riordan (1971–2018) – Irish singer, songwriter and multi-instrumentalist who achieved international fame as the lead vocalist of the rock band the Cranberries. In the 1990s, she sported a pixie cut or buzzed hair and performing barefoot, saying that "it just feels comfortable and honest to pull your toes along the ground". Billboard's William Goodman described O'Riordan performing "Barefoot and strutting onstage, an Irish warrior poet with a bleached blonde pixie cut, gold chain necklace, singing without a flinch, as if it were ordained".
- Stephanie Ashworth (b. 1974) – Australian bassist, photographer, artist and columnist, known for being a member with the bands Sandpit and Something for Kate. She frequently performs barefoot.
- Meg White (b. 1974) – American musician who was the drummer and occasional vocalist of the rock duo the White Stripes. She normally drummed barefoot.
- Tim Minchin (b. 1975) – Australian actor, writer, musician, poet, composer, songwriter and comedian. In his performances, he typically goes barefoot with wild hair and heavy eye makeup, which is juxtaposed with a crisp suit and tails, and a grand piano. According to Minchin, he likes going barefoot in his shows because it makes him feel more comfortable.
- Measha Brueggergosman (b. 1977) – Canadian soprano who performs both as an opera singer and concert artist.
- Rhiannon Giddens (b. 1977) – American musician and a founding member of the group Carolina Chocolate Drops.
- Shakira (b. 1977) – Colombian singer and songwriter known for frequently performing barefoot, a form of dance she learned as a young teen to overcome her shyness, and which gave name to a charity founded by her, Barefoot Foundation.
- Patricia Kopatchinskaja (b. 1977) – violinist of classical and contemporary music, born in Moldova, now living in Switzerland, playing barefoot on stage.
- Chris Martin (b. 1977) – English singer, songwriter and musician. He often rehearses for Coldplay shows barefoot, and has performed the songs "All My Love" and "We Pray" with no shoes on Saturday Night Live.

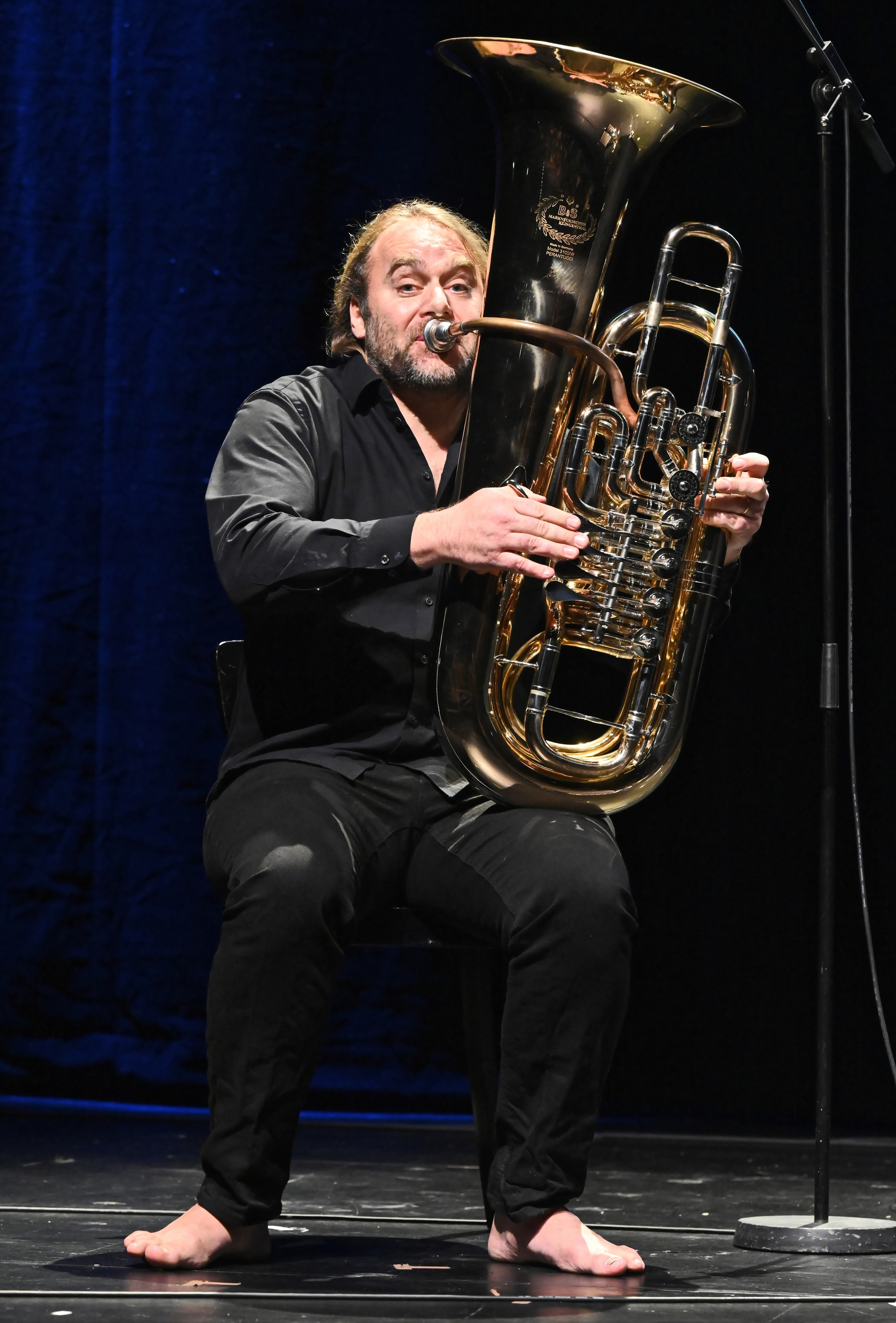
Andreas Martin Hofmeir performing barefoot at a concert in 2024

- Andreas Martin Hofmeir (b. 1978) – German tuba player and member of LaBrassBanda until 2014, playing barefoot on stage.
- Xavier Rudd (b. 1978) – Australian singer, songwriter, musician, and multi-instrumentalist.
- Camille (b. 1978) – French singer-songwriter. In an interview, she stated that "I need to feel the vibrations. It’s why I perform barefoot".
- Miya (b. 1979) – Japanese musician, songwriter, and record producer best known as guitarist and leader of the visual kei rock band Mucc. Like the other members of Mucc, Miya often performs barefoot, stating, "It's simply easier to move that way".
- Tatsuro (b. 1979) – Japanese singer and songwriter best known as lead vocalist of the visual kei rock band Mucc. Like the other members of Mucc, Tatsuro often performs barefoot. He said he got the idea after seeing Cocco's April 20, 2001 performance on Music Station, where the barefooted singer abruptly left the studio after finishing her song. He further explained that this was in Mucc's indie days when they had no money; whenever they were putting together new costumes, the shoes were typically the most expensive part, but as a visual kei band they could not simply wear sneakers. Nightmare vocalist Yomi said that he performed barefoot when he was an indie artist due to Tatsuro's influence.
- Mean Mary (b. 1980) – American singer-songwriter, player of banjo, guitar, fiddle and mandolin, is frequently barefoot on stage and in her videos.
- Wanlov the Kubolor (b. 1980) – Ghanaian-Romanian musician and film director.
- Jake Owen (b. 1981) – American country music singer.
- Jonny Lang (b. 1981) – American blues, gospel, rock singer, songwriter, and guitarist. In his earliest performing years, Lang always performed barefoot because "it feels good" and once in tribute to Luther Allison, a friend who had recently died. He has since given up that practice, after several near-accidents and electric shocks.
- Palmy (b. 1981) – Thai pop singer who is known to perform and make public appearances barefoot, and even has a barefoot-themed concert (Palmy Barefoot Acoustic Concert).
- Kelly Clarkson (b. 1982) – American singer, songwriter, and television personality.
- Barbara Weldens (1982–2017) – French singer-songwriter whose habit of performing barefoot resulted in her death by electrocution: her foot made contact with a defective piece of electrical equipment.
- Robert Emery (b. 1983) – English pianist, conductor, music producer and orchestrator renowned for conducting barefoot.
- Delta Goodrem (b. 1984) – Australian singer, songwriter and television personality. Her performances heavily feature the piano, which she usually plays barefoot while performing live.
- Tyson Ritter (b. 1984) – American musician, singer and actor who is the co-founder, frontman, bassist, pianist, and songwriter of the rock band The All-American Rejects.
- Ellie Goulding (b. 1986) – English singer-songwriter and activist who frequently performs barefoot.
- Kevin Parker (b. 1986) – Australian singer, songwriter, musician, record producer, and DJ, best known for his musical project Tame Impala.
- Derek Sanders (b. 1986) – American musician, lead singer of the rock band Mayday Parade.
- Stjepan Hauser (b. 1986) – Croatian cellist renowned for performing barefoot.
- Stelth Ulvang (b. 1986) – American musician, singer-songwriter and multi-instrumentalist, best known as a touring member of the folk rock band The Lumineers. He has acquired the nickname "Barefoot Wanderer" due to his habit of performing barefoot on stage.

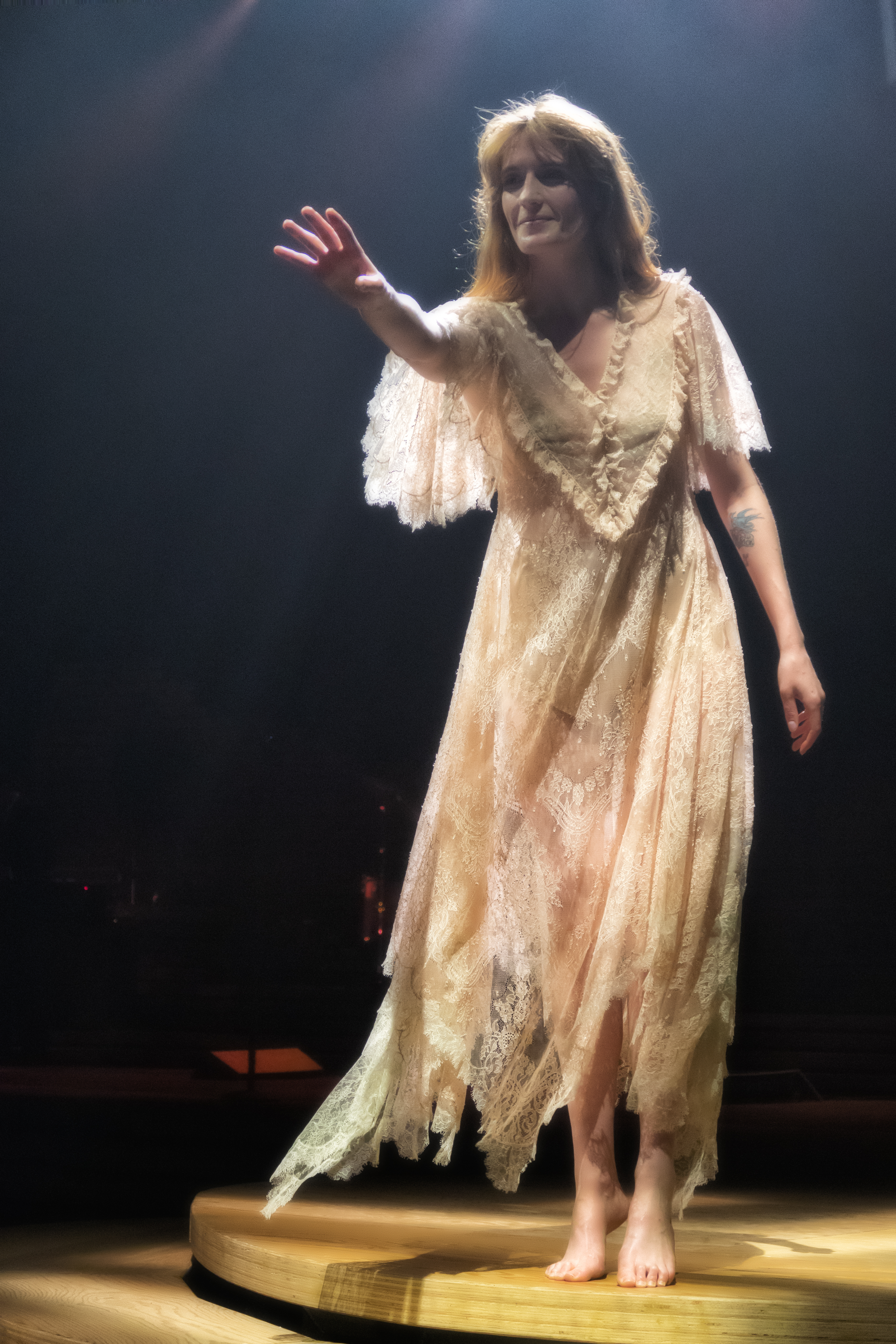
Florence Welch (seen here on the High as Hope Tour in 2018) frequently performs barefoot. She can often be seen wearing sheer, flowy dresses, on stage or otherwise.

- Florence Welch (b. 1986) – English singer-songwriter, known as the lead vocalist of Florence and the Machine, is known for performing barefoot.

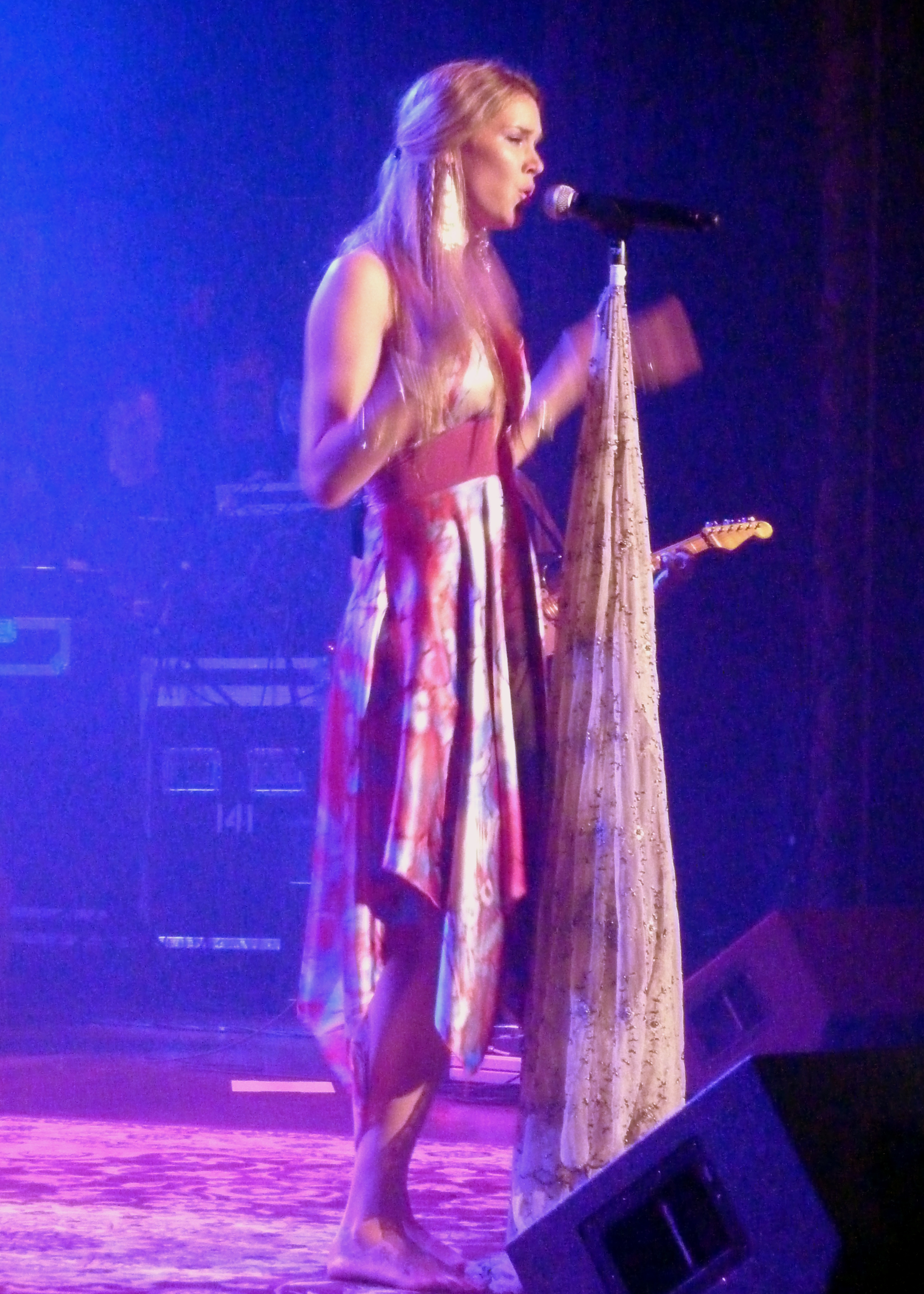
Joss Stone performing barefoot on stage

- Joss Stone (b. 1987) – British singer, songwriter and actress who regularly performs in bare feet and was referred to as a "barefoot diva" by The Guardian in 2004 for the same.
- Aurea (b. 1987) – Portuguese soul singer who is inspired by Joss Stone, and also frequently performs barefoot.
- Tove Lo (b. 1987) – Swedish singer-songwriter who is influenced by hippie fashion, and is frequently barefoot during her live performances.
- Melody Prochet (b. 1987) – French musician and the lead singer and songwriter of the musical project Melody's Echo Chamber. She described bare feet as "the best outfit for performing", and said that "I tried and loved the feeling of getting grounded and so I don’t think I’ve ever performed with shoes on".
- Alice Sara Ott (b. 1988) – German–Japanese pianist renowned for performing barefoot.
- Benjamin Clementine (b. 1988) – British actor, composer, and musician who often performs topless and barefoot onstage, dressed entirely in black or dark grey, with a long, wool trench coat.
- Mandy Harvey (b. 1988) – American jazz and pop singer and songwriter. Profoundly deaf following an illness at the age of eighteen, she performs barefoot to feel the music through ground vibrations.
- Jodok Vuille (b. 1988) – Swiss cellist renowned for performing barefoot.

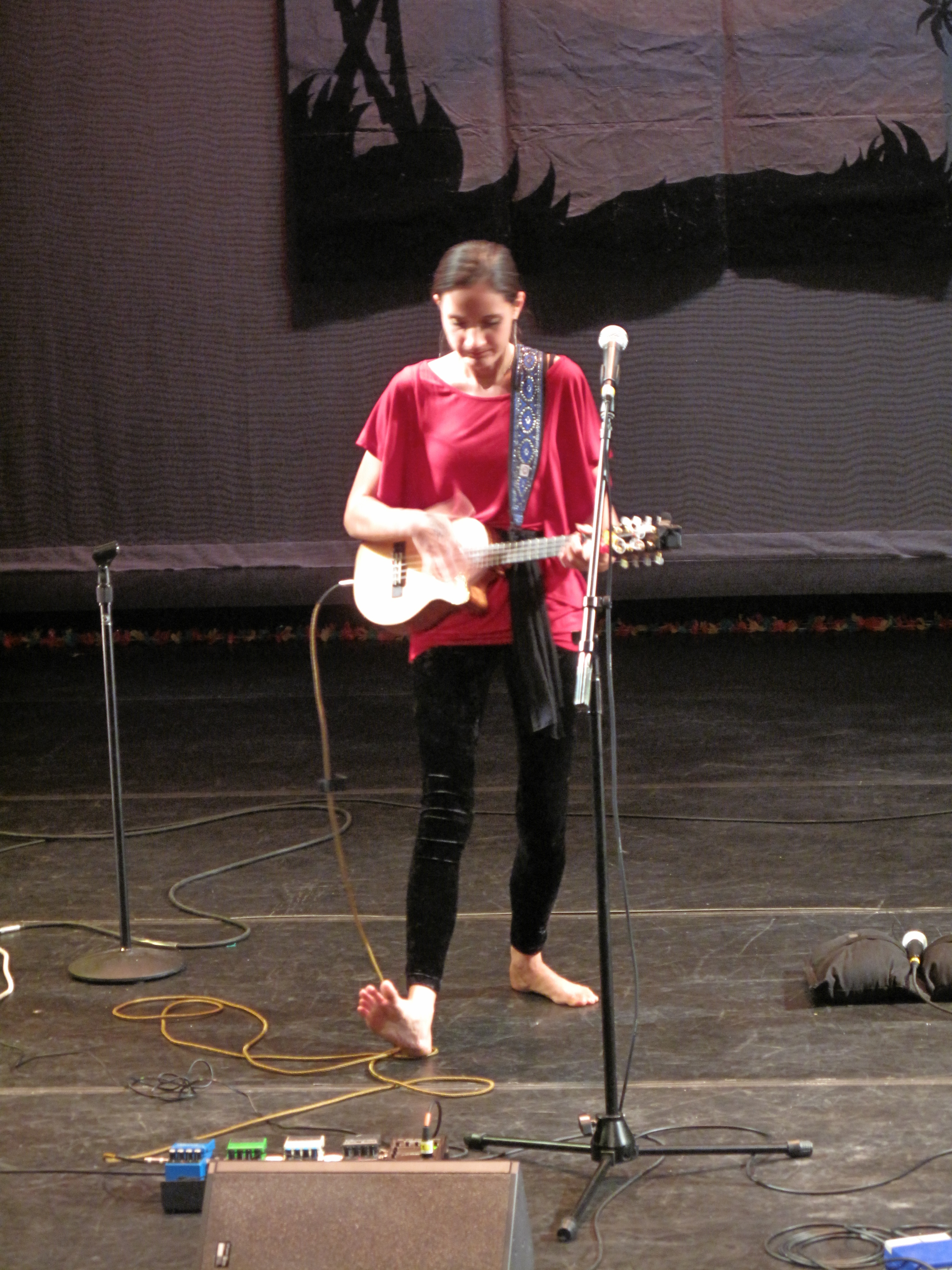
Taimane Gardner performing barefoot

- Taimane Gardner (b. 1989) – Hawaiian ukulele player who consistently plays barefoot.
- Billy Nomates (b. 1990) – English musician and singer-songwriter.
- Felix Klieser (b. 1991) – German professional player of the French horn. Born without arms, he plays the horn with his feet.
- Pixie Lott (b. 1991) – British singer who often performs barefoot.
- Diana Vickers (b. 1991) – English singer, songwriter and actress who regularly performs barefoot.
- Ashe (b. 1993) – American singer-songwriter.
- Mikyung Sung (b. 1993) – Korean classical double bass player who performs mostly barefoot.
- Camilo (b. 1994) – Colombian singer, musician and songwriter who always performs barefoot.
- Jacob Collier (b. 1994) – English singer, songwriter, multi-instrumentalist, producer and educator.

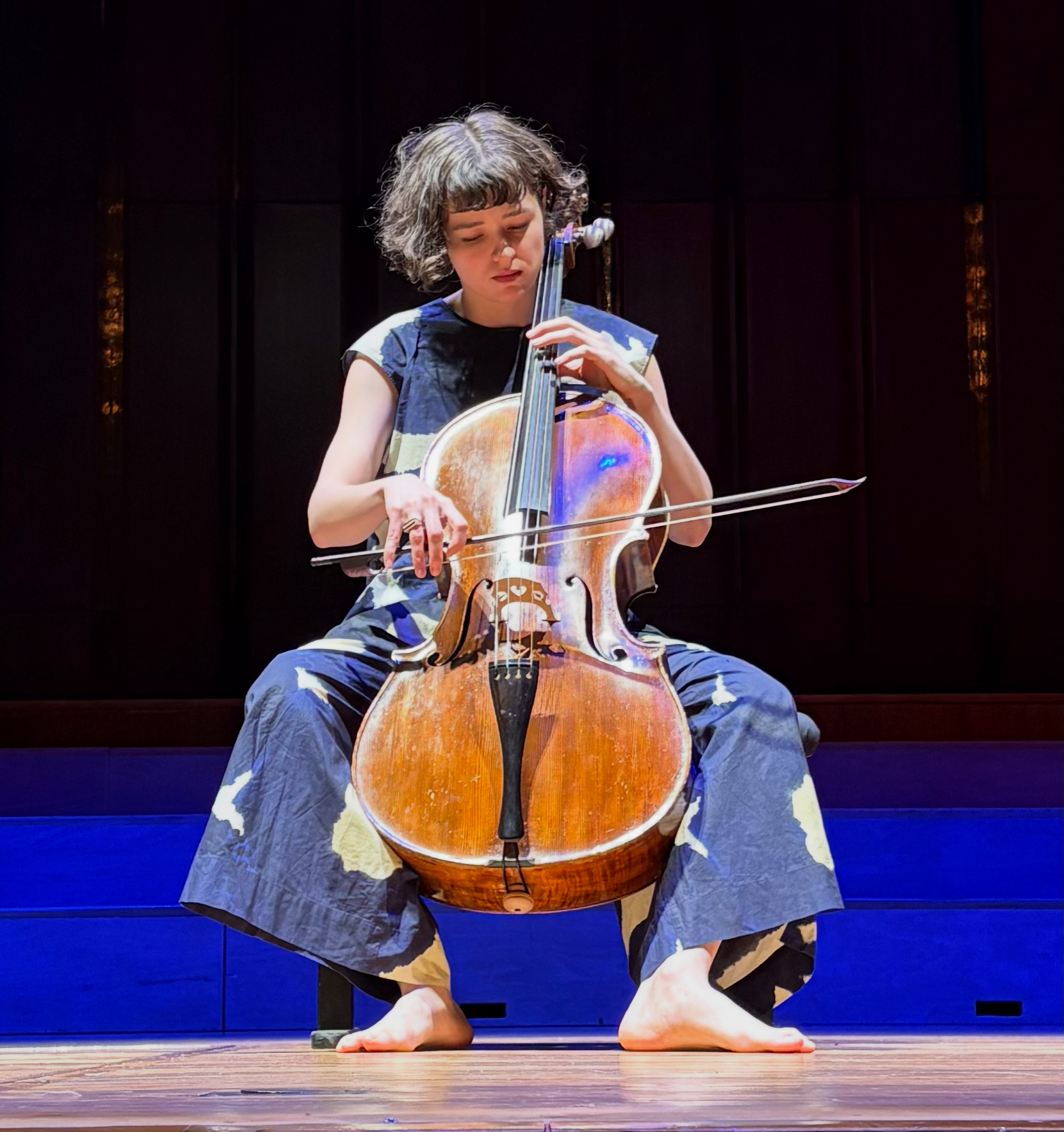
Anastasia Kobekina

- Anastasia Kobekina (b. 1994) – Russian cellist who frequently performs barefoot.
- Tash Sultana (b. 1995) – Australian singer-songwriter, multi-instrumentalist and music producer renowned for performing barefoot.
- Aurora (b. 1996) – Norwegian pop singer, songwriter and record producer who usually performs barefoot.
- Sayuri (1996–2024) – Japanese musician, singer and songwriter who frequently performed barefoot. In a 2018 interview, she stated that she did this because it gave her direct contact with the ground.
- Raye (b. 1997) – British singer-songwriter known for performing barefoot.
- Lucienne Renaudin Vary (b. 1999) – French international classical and jazz trumpet player, who consistently performs barefoot on stage.
- Madame (b. 2002) – Italian singer-songwriter and rapper who frequently sings barefoot, and has a preference for being barefoot in everyday life.
- Angelina Jordan (b. 2006) – Norwegian singer. After meeting a shoeless child in Asia and giving the child her shoes, Jordan pledged to always perform barefoot onstage until "all children in the world have shoes of their own".
- George Nowak – German-born singer who performs primarily in the Cayman Islands, and who became known as the Barefoot Man for his tendency to perform without shoes. He has been commonly compared to Jimmy Buffett and other island performers and songwriters.
- Spiral Beach – Canadian indie rock band whose members frequently performed barefoot.
- 7 Blue Skies – American alternative rock band formed in 2004 whose members always performed barefoot.
- Barefoot Truth – American independent roots rock band from New England, consisting of Will Evans, Jay Driscoll, Andy Wrba, Garrett Duffy, and John "Wayno" Waynelovich. The band got its name because its members always performed barefoot.
- LaBrassBanda – Bavarian brass band whose members are renowned for performing barefoot.
- Sam Kiszka and other members of the Greta Van Fleet music band frequently perform barefoot.
- Khn de Poitrine, the guitarist of the Canadian rock duo Angine de Poitrine, normally performs barefoot, with black dots painted on his feet.

=== Businesspeople ===
- Lilly Pulitzer (1931–2013) – American entrepreneur, fashion designer, socialite, and the founder of the clothing brand Lilly Pulitzer, Inc. Lilly was known for her bohemian lifestyle: she was often spotted on Worth Avenue barefoot with her pet monkey in tow, and a 1963 Life magazine story dedicated to her was titled "A Barefoot Tycoon Makes Lillies Bloom".
- Phil Knight (b. 1938) – American billionaire businessman who is the co-founder and chairman emeritus of Nike, Inc. His real-life barefoot habit was depicted in the film Air, in which he was portrayed by Ben Affleck.
- Steve Jobs (1955–2011) – American businessman, inventor, and investor best known for co-founding the technology company Apple Inc. Jobs was known to frequently appear barefooted in his office, and was depicted this way in a feature dedicated to him in Time magazine. His barefoot habit had to do with his background in counterculture and spirituality (Jobs' appearance was often compared to that of a hippie), and was depicted in the films Pirates of Silicon Valley (1999) and Jobs (2013). It also had an impact on American corporate culture, and was adopted by some other entrepreneurs, most notably Adam Neumann.
- Adam Neumann (b. 1979) – American and Israeli businessman, investor, and billionaire. His barefoot habit was depicted in the drama miniseries WeCrashed (2022).

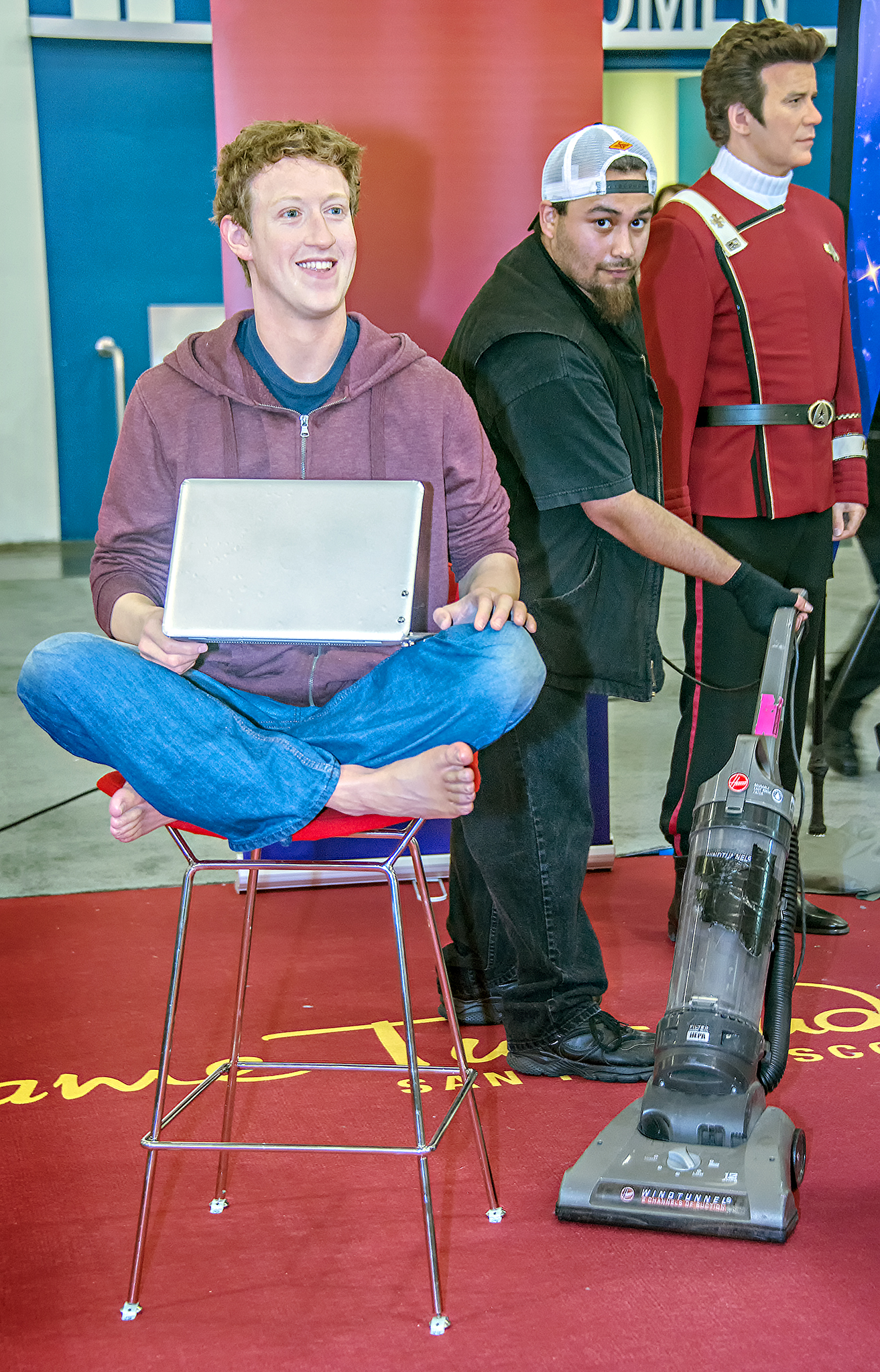
Barefoot sculpture of Mark Zuckerberg at the Madame Tussauds wax museum

- Mark Zuckerberg (b. 1984) – American businessman and the founder of the social media service Facebook, known for frequently appearing in public barefoot or wearing only flip-flops. His wax sculpture at the Madame Tussauds museum also depicts him barefooted, as does the 2010 film The Social Network and the cover of the graphic novel Mark Zuckerberg: Creator of Facebook.
- Seth Priebatsch (b. 1989) – American entrepreneur and the founder of SCVNGR and LevelUp. As a part of his public image, he is known to frequently appear barefoot in his office.
- Palmer Luckey (b. 1992) – American entrepreneur best known as the founder of Oculus VR and designer of the Oculus Rift. He maintains a casual appearance, is frequently barefoot, and prefers sandals to shoes even at trade shows and events.

=== Sportspeople ===
- Yannick Noah (b. 1960) – French former professional tennis player and singer, who was inducted into the International Tennis Hall of Fame in 2005.
- Luis Enrique (b. 1970) – Spanish football coach.
- Mack Hollins (b. 1993) – American National Football League wide receiver that currently plays for the New England Patriots. Hollins is known for going barefoot in most situations. He has gained the nickname "Tarzan" as a result. He has even inspired several teammates to try his habits. He still wears cleats on the field during games, but has said he would play football barefoot if he were allowed to.

==== Mountaineers ====
- Gwen Moffat (b. 1924) – British mountaineer and writer known for often climbing barefoot, claiming that it was better because there was more contact with the rock and no constriction of the toes.
- Bernd Arnold (b. 1947) – German rock climber and mountaineer well-known for climbing barefoot, even on very hard routes.
- Tom Perry (b. 1960) – Italian mountain climber who became known as the "barefoot climber" for always climbing barefoot.
- Charles Albert (b. 1997) – French mountain climber who became known as "Barefoot Charles" and "Mowgli" due to his preference for climbing barefoot.

==== Barefoot runners ====
- Abebe Bikila (1932–1973) – Ethiopian marathon runner and first athlete from sub-Saharan Africa to win an Olympic gold medal who won the 1960 Summer Olympics marathon with a new world record, running barefoot.
- Bruce Tulloh (1935–2018) – British long-distance runner who competed at the 1960 Summer Olympics. He was famous for running barefoot in many of his races.
- Shivnath Singh (1946–2003) – Indian long-distance runner renowned as one of the greatest in India. He competed barefoot throughout his running career.
- Zola Budd (b. 1966) – South African middle-distance and long-distance runner. Budd mainly trained and raced barefoot.

==== Wrestlers ====
- Bert Ruby (1910–1968) – Hungarian-American professional wrestler, professional wrestling trainer, and wrestling promoter. Ruby wrestled barefoot for much of his career, earning him the nickname "The Man With the Educated Toes".
- Antonino Rocca (1921–1977) – Italian-Argentine professional wrestler renowned for wrestling barefoot.
- Judy Grable (1935–2008) – American professional wrestler nicknamed "The Barefoot Contessa" due to her preference for wrestling barefoot.
- Erich Froelich (1937–2023) – German-Canadian professional wrestler who was known for wrestling barefoot.
- Peter Maivia (1937–1982) – Samoan professional wrestler renowned for wrestling barefoot.
- Jimmy Snuka (1943–2017) – Fijian and American professional wrestler.
- Afa Anoaʻi (1943–2024) and Sika Anoaʻi (1945–2024), collectively known as the Wild Samoans – Samoan-American professional wrestling tag team consisting of two brothers who wrestled barefoot as a part of their "wild men" image.
- Kamala (1950–2020) – American professional wrestler. Nicknamed "The Ugandan Giant", Kamala portrayed a fearsome and simpleminded Ugandan. He wrestled barefoot, clad only in a loincloth, his face painted with war paint and two stars painted on his chest and a moon painted on his stomach.
- Kevin Von Erich (b. 1957) – American retired professional wrestler known for wrestling barefoot. Announcers often jokingly referred to him as "The Barefoot Boy" on WCCW broadcasts; his barefoot wrestling style is also depicted in the 2023 movie The Iron Claw.
- Velvet McIntyre (b. 1962) – Canadian retired professional wrestler. McIntyre wore wrestling boots for the first four years of her career, but later wrestled barefoot when someone took one of her boots as a joke and she was forced to wrestle without them. Wrestling barefoot subsequently became one of her trademarks.
- Matt Riddle (b. 1986) – American professional wrestler and former mixed martial artist renowned for wrestling barefoot.
- Mike Bailey (b. 1990) – Canadian professional wrestler.

=== Travelers, adventurers, and environmentalists ===
- Dot Butler (1911–2008) – Australian bushwalker, mountaineer and conservationist who became known as "the barefoot bushwalker" because she rarely wore boots or any other footwear when walking. She also named her autobiography "The Barefoot Bush Walker".
- Allan Savory (b. 1935) – Zimbabwean livestock farmer, ecologist, and former Rhodesian politician who normally goes around barefoot and wearing khaki shorts.
- Rob Bredl (b. 1950) – Australian documentary film-maker, a reptile specialist and owner of the "Blue Planet Wildlife Park". He became known as the "barefoot bushman" because he has the habit of being barefoot, both at home and in the bush, even if he is out catching crocodiles.
- Stephen King (b. 1952/1953) – New Zealand botanist and conservationist noted for his barefooted activism. King was expelled from his college for refusing to wear shoes.

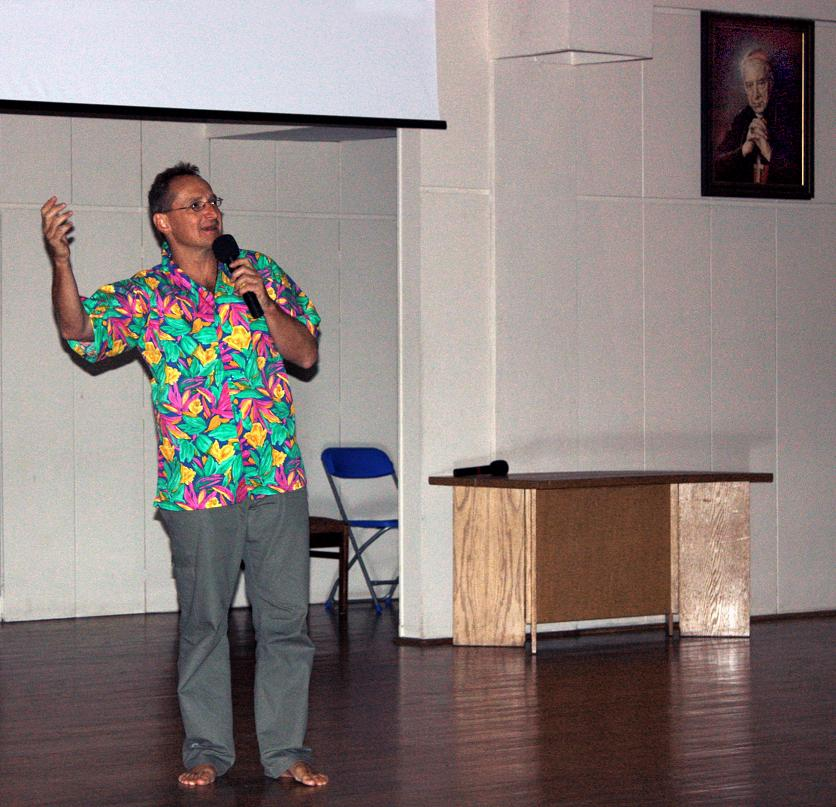
Wojciech Cejrowski, the host of the travel show "Barefoot Around the World".

- Wojciech Cejrowski (b. 1964) – Polish traveller, journalist and writer who normally travels barefoot, and is the host of a travel show called Barefoot Around the World.
- Cody Lundin (b. 1967) – American survival instructor and a former co-host of Discovery Channel's reality television series Dual Survival, in which he demonstrated various survival skills while wearing shorts in all weather and going barefoot.
- Saba Douglas-Hamilton (b. 1970) – Kenyan wildlife conservationist and television presenter who lives a barefoot lifestyle in the bush.
- Mark Baumer (1983–2017) – American writer, adventurer, and environmental activist. Inspired by Christopher McDougall's book Born to Run about the health benefits of barefoot running, Baumer embraced a barefoot lifestyle, and undertook a barefoot journey across the United States to raise awareness of climate change. On January 21, 2017, Baumer was struck and killed by an S.U.V. while walking barefoot in Walton County, Florida. A 2019 documentary about his life is called Barefoot: The Mark Baumer Story.
- Robin Greenfield (b. 1986) – American environmental activist and adventurer known for going barefoot for over a decade.
- Eva zu Beck (b. 1991) – Polish travel and adventure blogger, vlogger and presenter, who adopted a barefoot lifestyle.
- Gina Chick – Australian adventurer best known as the winner of the first season of the survival reality television series Alone Australia and a co-host of the documentary series Great Australian Walks.

=== Other ===
- Patrick Henry (1736–1799) – American politician, Governor of Virginia, spent his youth and private life mostly barefoot, also encouraging his children and grandchildren to do likewise.
- Mick Dodge (b. 1951) – American modern-day hermit known for living a barefoot lifestyle in the Hoh Rainforest in Washington. Dodge is known as "The Barefoot Sensei" and "the Barefooted Nomad", and is the subject of the National Geographic Channel reality TV series The Legend of Mick Dodge, about his unusual life dwelling in a forest.
- Susan Powter (b. 1957) – Australian-born American motivational speaker, nutritionist, personal trainer, and author. Her platinum-white close-cropped haircut, emphatic speaking manner, and habit of being barefoot while speaking in public, became trademarks of her celebrity.
- Sabrina Fox (b. 1958) – German writer and TV host who has been a barefooter since 2014. She describes this as a freedom that she restored to her feet, woke them up and suddenly really felt the ground again. She only wears shoes in situations where gloves are needed for the hands, i. e. to protect herself from heat or cold.
- Paul Fraser Smith (b. 1958 or 1959) – New Zealand cannabis grower and advocate who adopted the alias "Gandalf the Green Fairy" as a nod to The Lord of the Rings character, reflecting his long, silver-grey hair and barefoot lifestyle.
- Nina Stibbe (b. 1962) – British writer. Stibbe was a barefooter prior to and during her time as a nanny for Mary-Kay Wilmers, something which was depicted in the 2016 television adaptation of her book Love, Nina: Despatches from Family Life after Faye Marsay, the actress playing Nina, decided to go barefoot for the duration of filming.
- Jessica Cox (b. 1983) – American pilot who was born without arms and became the world's first armless pilot, using her feet for piloting and performing everyday tasks.
- Colton Harris Moore (b. 1991) – American former fugitive who became known as the "Barefoot Bandit" by reportedly committing some of his crimes barefoot.

== Fictional characters ==
Bare feet are a consistent element in the depiction of some fictional characters. This is an especially common detail in the portrayal of feral children (Tarzan, Mowgli) and characters with animalistic traits (InuYasha, Kyo Sohma), mentally unstable characters (Ophelia, River Tam), free-spirited and nonconformist characters who flout social norms (the detective L, Radical Edward, Nahla Ake), characters associated with Asian martial arts (Kwai Chang Caine, Mantis), and some characters with supernatural powers (Coriakin, Shinra Kusakabe, Ezekiel Sims).

=== Mythological characters ===
- Barefoot Immortal – Taoist deity in Chinese religion. Never wearing any shoes and having a half bald head are his unique marks and looks.

=== Anime and manga ===
- Binchō-tan – the main character in the eponymous manga and anime series, a young girl who lives by herself in an old house far from town and is always barefoot.
- Edward Wong Hau Pepelu Tivrusky IV (also known as Radical Edward and Ed) – fictional character in the anime series Cowboy Bebop, an extremely eccentric teenage hacker girl who almost always appears barefoot.
- Hestia – fictional character in the light novel series Is It Wrong to Try to Pick Up Girls in a Dungeon?, and its manga and anime adaptations, a goddess named after the Greek goddess of the hearth. She is normally depicted barefoot.
- Inuyasha – the titular character and a protagonist of the 1996 manga series Inuyasha, as well as several adaptations of the manga series. As a half-human, half-dog-demon hybrid, he sports numerous canine characteristics, which is why he is perpetually barefoot.
- Komichi Akebi – the protagonist of the manga and anime series Akebi's Sailor Uniform, a girl who frequently goes barefoot to demonstrate her quirky and free-spirited personality.
- Kyo Sohma – one of the main characters in the manga and anime series Fruits Basket. He normally goes barefoot due to being possessed by the spirit of the Cat (and thus having catlike traits), and also due to his background in martial arts.
- L – main antagonist in the manga and anime series Death Note. He is an eccentric detective with many quirky habits, including a penchant for going barefoot.
- Mavis Vermillion – fictional character in the manga and anime series Fairy Tail, a child prodigy and the first and founding master of the Fairy Tail guild. She developed a habit of walking barefoot in her childhood, as she was raised by a harsh guild master who took her shoes away.
- Shinra Kusakabe – one of the main characters in the manga and anime series Fire Force, a pyrokinetic who frequently goes barefoot because he has the ability to ignite fire from his feet.
- Ronja – the protagonist of the 2014 anime series Ronja, the Robber's Daughter (based on the eponymous novel by Astrid Lindgren) normally goes barefoot, as she does in the original novel.

=== Literature ===
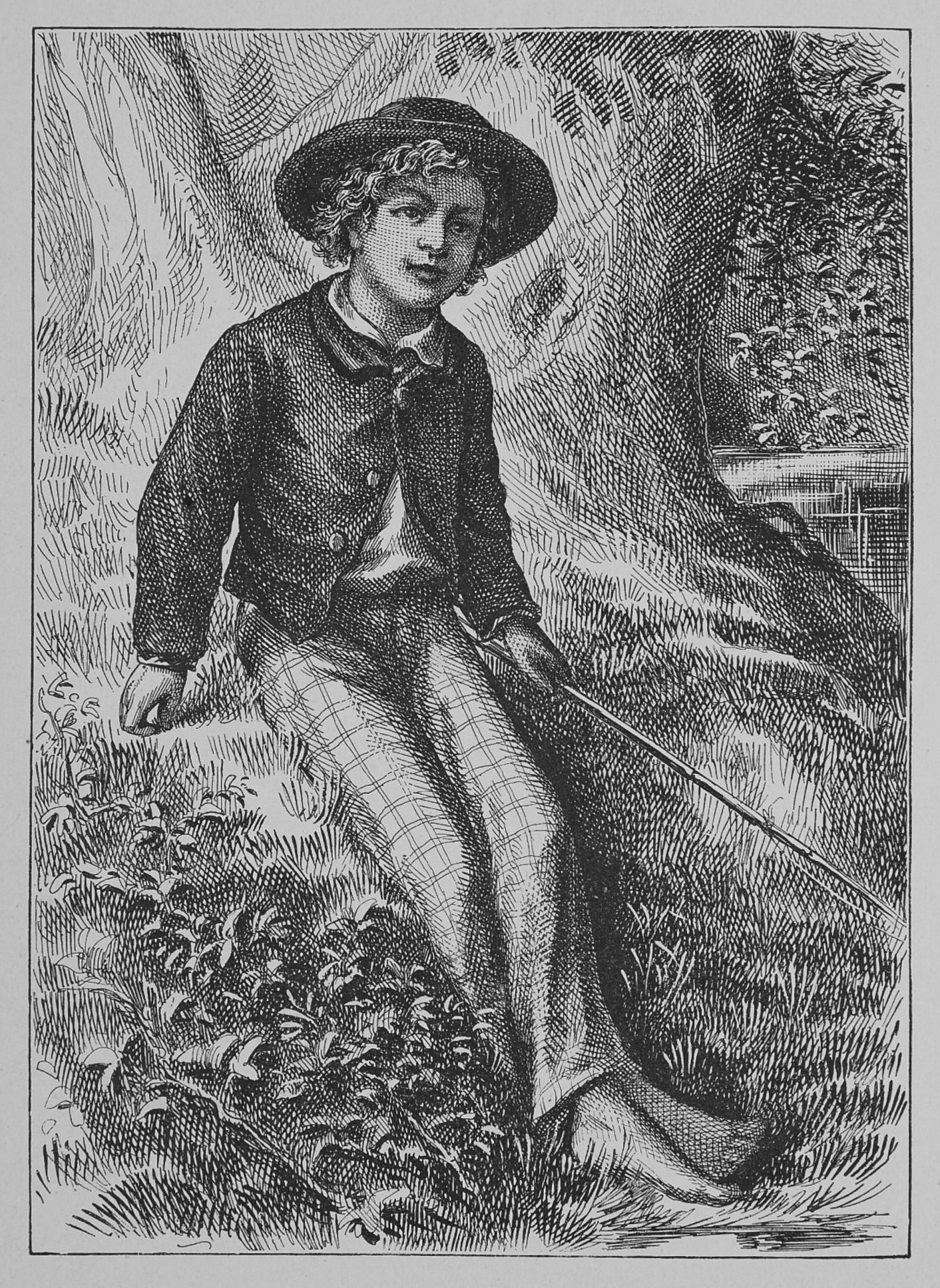
Tom Sawyer, as depicted in the front piece of the first edition of The Adventures of Tom Sawyer (1876)

- Tom Sawyer and Huckleberry Finn, the protagonists of The Adventures of Tom Sawyer and Adventures of Huckleberry Finn by Mark Twain, usually go barefoot, as was the norm among American boys in decades such as 1840s, when the books are set. In Mark Twain's own words, "a boy who didn't go barefooted, or wore shoes when it was not absolutely necessary, was viewed as a 'Miss Nelly'. The unfortunate lad being an object of complete derision among my companions".
- Mowgli – fictional character featured in Rudyard Kipling's 1894 The Jungle Book story collection. He goes barefoot due to being a feral child raised by wolves.
- Rima – main female character from the 1904 novel Green Mansions, a girl who lives in a forest and communicates with birds. Her lack of footwear is also depicted in the 1959 film adaptation starring Audrey Hepburn.
- Tarzan – eponymous protagonist of Edgar Rice Burroughs's 1912-1965 Tarzan series. As a feral child raised by apes, he prefers going barefoot because he can use his feet like hands.
- Hobbits – fictional race from J. R. R. Tolkien's 1937 The Hobbit and other works taking place in Tolkien's Middle-earth setting. Hobbits usually go barefoot due to their tough leather soles replacing the need for shoes.
- Waldo Farthingwaite-Jones – eponymous protagonist of Robert A. Heinlein's 1942 short story Waldo. Having spent much of his life unable to walk, when he is finally able to do so he states that shoes "feel dead".
- Coriakin and Ramandu – magicians and stars in human form from C. S. Lewis's 1952 novel The Voyage of the Dawn Treader who are both described as old men with a long beard and bare feet. It has been suggested that their lack of footwear has to do with religious connotations and with the "holy hermit" archetype.
- Caroline Mshiyeni – character from Robert A. Heinlein's 1955 novel Tunnel in the Sky (1955) who goes barefoot in contrast to her fellow Advanced Survival classmates.
- Susanna – eponymous main female character of Kurt Vonnegut's 1956 short story Miss Temptation.
- Princess Eilonwy – princess and enchantress from Lloyd Alexander's 1963-68 book series The Chronicles of Prydain who normally goes barefoot or wears sandals. The version of the character depicted in the 1985 Disney adaptation of The Black Cauldron was originally intended to be a barefooter as well, but was ultimately depicted as wearing shoes.

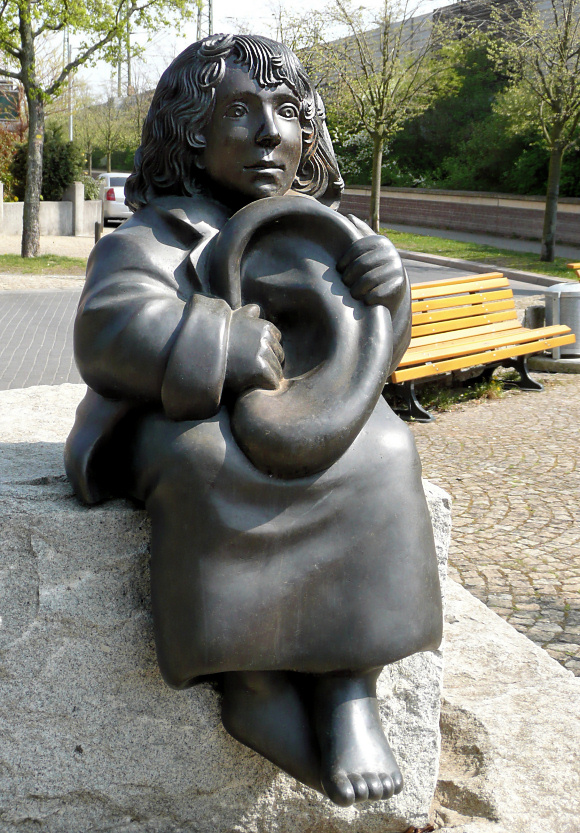
A monument to Momo in Hanover

- Momo – eponymous protagonist of Michael Ende's 1973 novel Momo, a girl of unknown origin with few possessions and a lot of time. When her appearance is first described, it is mentioned that she "had very big, beautiful eyes as black as her hair, and feet of almost the same colour, for she nearly always went around barefoot." The comparative silence of her barefooted steps compared to other people's shod steps is also described.
- Ronja, the Robber's Daughter – protagonist of the eponymous 1981 novel by Astrid Lindgren who normally goes around barefoot.
- Tahiri Veila – Jedi character from the pre-Disney "Legends" strand of the Star Wars Expanded Universe, first appearing in the 1995-97 Junior Jedi Knights series. Hailing from the desert planet of Tatooine, Tahiri began going barefoot as an appreciation of the contrast between her homeworld and the more hospitable conditions of Yavin 4, with this eventually developing into a lifelong trait.
- Sue – character appearing in Roger Harvey's 2009 novel Albatross Bay who lives in a beach house, always barefoot. Sue is an expert swimmer; the children in the story assume she must be a mermaid, believing mermaids can never wear shoes.
- Kya Clark – protagonist of the 2018 book Where the Crawdads Sing, alternates between being barefoot and wearing shoes. The 2022 film adaptation, starring Daisy Edgar-Jones as Kya, also depicts the character as having a barefoot habit.

=== Theatre ===
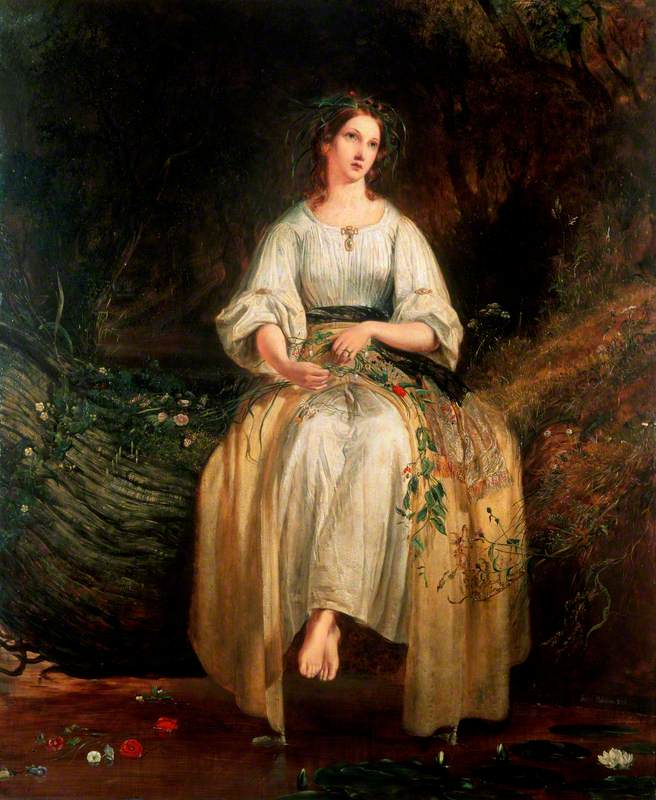
Richard Redgrave, Ophelia Weaving Her Garlands (1842)

- Ophelia – prominent female character in Hamlet. While the original text does not mention whether she is barefoot at any given point, it has become customary to depict her as such once she has descended into madness.
- Gillian Holroyd – main female character in Bell, Book and Candle, an art store owner (and witch) who frequently goes barefoot as a manifestation of her free-spirited personality. The 1958 film adaptation, starring Kim Novak as Gillian, retains the character's preference for being barefoot, but only while she remains in possession of her witch's powers.

=== Comics ===
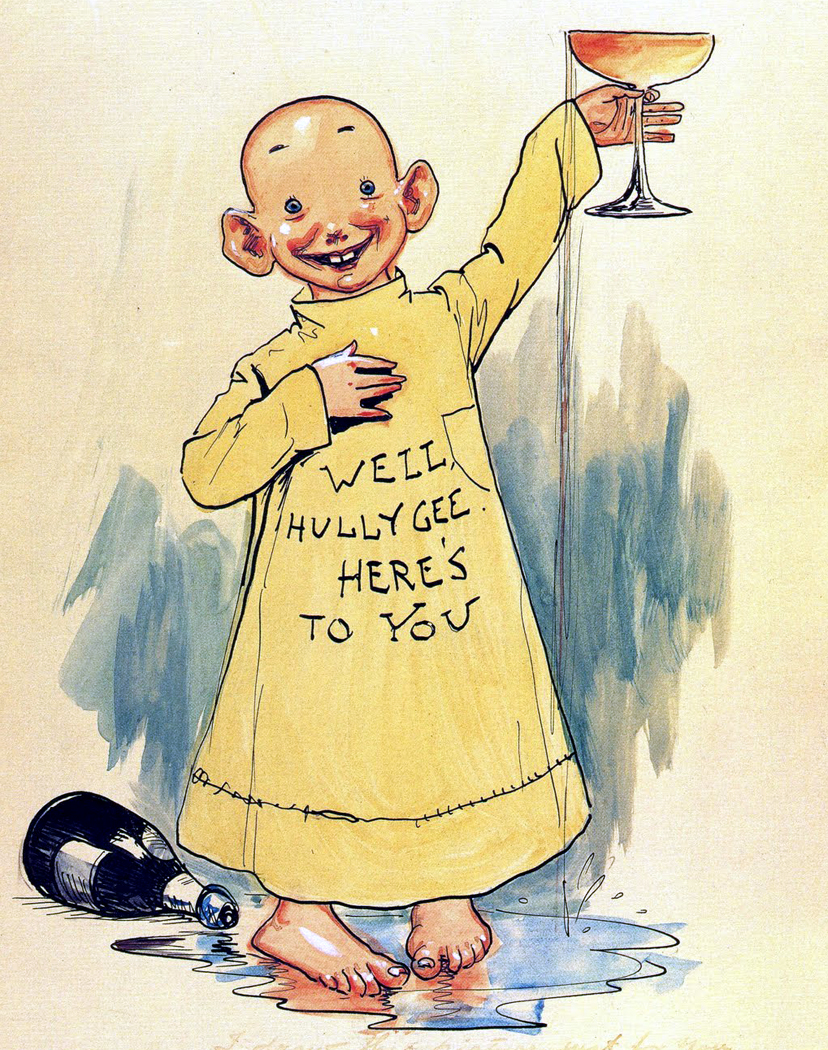
The Yellow Kid

- The Yellow Kid – comic strip character set in a New York City slum in the 1890s.
- Ezekiel Sims – Marvel Comics character who appeared in the stories featuring Spider-Man. Ezekiel has the same powers as Spider-Man, and is usually seen barefoot because it allows him to stick to walls. He is also portrayed this way by Tahar Rahim in the 2024 movie Madame Web.
- Gypsy – DC Comics character, a superheroine who patterned her costume after common stereotypes of Romani dress, including bare feet.
- Mantis – Marvel Comics superheroine who first appeared in The Avengers in 1973. She is usually depicted barefoot to signify her connection to nature and her background in Asian martial arts.
- Namor the Sub-Mariner – Marvel Comics antihero. Due to being a mutant son of a human sea captain and a princess of the mythical undersea kingdom of Atlantis, he has small wings on his ankles, allowing him to fly. For this reason, he is almost always barefoot.
- Hulk – Marvel Comics superhero. As the alternate form of the scientist Bruce Banner (who transforms into Hulk in the moments of rage), he is always barefoot and near-naked because his clothes and shoes are torn apart during transformation.
- She-Hulk – Marvel Comics superheroine who is frequently depicted barefoot, and is portrayed this way by Tatiana Maslany in the 2022 TV series She-Hulk: Attorney at Law.
- Issues of Archie and related comics such as Betty and Veronica and Josie that were published during the late 1960s and early 1970s (as well as entries in the comic strip version from the same era) regularly featured various characters (including the main characters at times) who went barefoot. Some barefoot-centric stories would also appear in editions published after that era.
- The Star Wars character Amilyn Holdo is barefoot during the events of "The Bridge" (Age of Resistance Special 1).

=== Live-action films ===
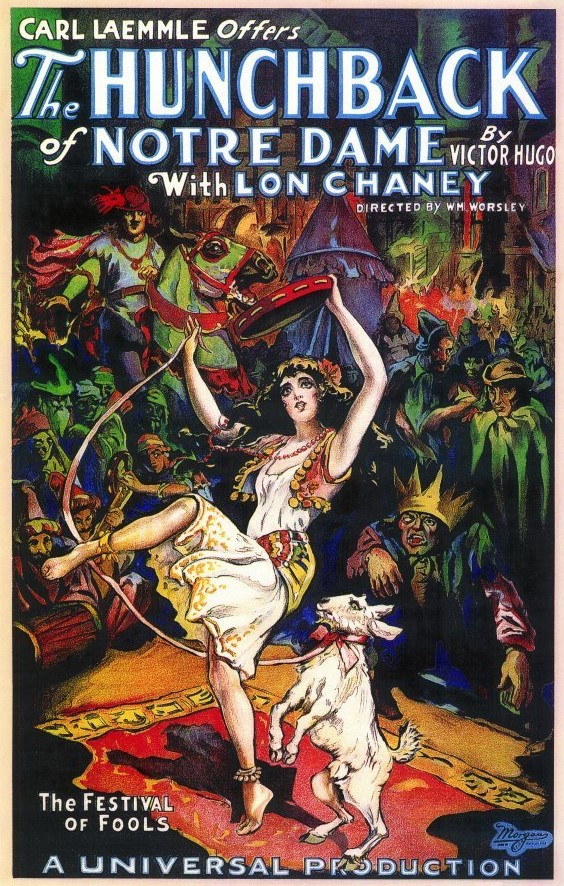
Esmeralda depicted barefoot in the theatrical poster for the 1923 movie The Hunchback of Notre Dame

- While the character of Esmeralda from The Hunchback of Notre-Dame wears shoes in the original novel, the 1923 film adaptation (starring Patsy Ruth Miller) and 1939 film adaptation (starring Maureen O'Hara) both feature scenes where she is barefoot. The version of the character depicted in the 1956 film adaptation, starring Gina Lollobrigida, does not wear shoes at all.
- Maria Vargas – eponymous main female character in the 1954 film The Barefoot Contessa. Maria's actress, Ava Gardner, had her own barefoot habit which led to her accepting the role (see Actors and actresses section above).
- Juliete Hardy – main female character in the 1956 film And God Created Woman. Juliete's actress, Brigitte Bardot, had her own barefoot habit (see Actors and actresses section above).
- Altaira – main female character in the 1956 film Forbidden Planet. While described in the script as wearing sandals, Altaira spends most of her scenes in bare feet.
- The opening scenes of the 1984 Supergirl film depict a version of Argo City where, among other things, most Kryptonians (including Kara Zor-El/Supergirl) go about their lives in bare feet.
- Tinker Bell – fictional character from J. M. Barrie's 1904 play Peter Pan and its 1911 novelisation Peter and Wendy. She has been depicted as a barefooter in two movie adaptations: the 1991 film Hook (portrayed by Julia Roberts) and the 2023 film Peter Pan & Wendy (portrayed by Yara Shahidi). In the former case, this detail was inspired by Roberts' own barefoot habit.
- Films written and directed by Quentin Tarantino have been remarked on for the frequency with which female characters such as Mia Wallace (Pulp Fiction) and "The Bride" (Kill Bill: Volume 1, Kill Bill: Volume 2) spend a significant amount of time in bare feet.
- Hedda Amerson – main female character in the 1997 film Loved.
- Eloise – main female character in the 2000 film The Million Dollar Hotel who goes barefoot as part of her eccentric personality. Milla Jovovich went barefoot for two months in real life as part of her preparations for the role.
- In the 2003 film Big Fish, all of the residents of the fictional town of Spectre are barefoot by order, with a clothesline at the town entrance being festooned with discarded shoes.
- Leila – main female character in the 2005 German romantic comedy Barfuss. The equivalent character in the 2014 American remake, Daisy, is also a barefooter.
- Felicia Alpine – member of the main trio of characters in the 2008 film Sex Drive. Felicia throws her shoes onto a tree that is covered with many other shoes and spends much of the rest of the film in bare feet (before eventually acquiring a pair of flip-flops).
- Maleficent – eponymous protagonist of the 2014 film Maleficent. Maleficent is barefoot while in her initial, benevolent state. Aurora has a barefoot habit in the 2019 sequel Maleficent: Mistress of Evil.
- Mia Hall – protagonist of the 2014 film adaptation of If I Stay. Mia is barefoot while in her disembodied state.
- Soledad Páramo – protagonist of the 2015 Spanish mockumentary Soledad Descalza. Soledad is perpetually barefoot but otherwise leads a normal life.
- Hannah von Reichmerl – main female character in the 2016 film A Cure for Wellness. Mia Goth said that her character's bare feet were meant to emphasise her ethereal nature.
- Mother – eponymous protagonist of the 2017 film mother!. Both her actress Jennifer Lawrence and director-screenwriter Darren Aronofsky decided that the character should be barefoot to symbolise her connection to the house in which the film takes place.
- Anna – protagionist of the 2018 film Wildling.
- The Abbott family – protagonists of A Quiet Place and A Quiet Place Part II. The family spends the duration of both films in bare feet as part of their survival precautions against "Death Angel" aliens who are highly sensitive to sound and have overrun Earth prior to the events of the first film. Some other human characters, such as Emmett from Part II, still use footwear as normal.
- Rose the Hat – main antagonist in the 2019 film Doctor Sleep. The character's barefoot tendencies were partly inspired by those of her actress Rebecca Ferguson (see Actors and actresses section above).
- Bhairavi – main character in the 2025 Indian supernatural thriller film Odela 2, a powerful Nāga Sadhu and devotee of Lord Shiva.

=== Animation ===
- Pumuckl – animated barefooted household sprite (Kobold) who haunts the workshop of the owner.
- Aurora – eponymous main female character in Sleeping Beauty. Aurora goes barefoot while in her Briar Rose guise.
- All the characters in The Flintstones animated series go barefoot, due to the series being set in the Stone Age.
- Aladdin – main character in the Disney animated films Aladdin (1992), The Return of Jafar (1994), and Aladdin and the King of Thieves (1996), and the animated TV series Aladdin (1994–1995). In the first movie, he appears barefoot due to poverty and due to being a street urchin, but he retains the barefoot appearance even in the sequels, after he marries the princess Jasmine.
- Pocahontas – main character in the Disney animated films Pocahontas (1995) and Pocahontas II: Journey to a New World (1998). As a Native American, Pocahontas was depicted barefoot, presumably to signify her connection to nature.
- The 1996 Disney animated adaptation of The Hunchback of Notre-Dame is another adaptation in which the character of Esmeralda is portrayed as being perpetually barefoot.
- Rapunzel – main character in the Disney animated movies Tangled (2010), Tangled Ever After (2012), and Tangled: Before Ever After (2017), and in the animated series Rapunzel's Tangled Adventure (2017–2020). Rapunzel is depicted as a barefooter, and her voice actor Mandy Moore was barefoot herself while recording her lines. Moore said: "I like to think of her as the bohemian Disney princess. She's barefoot and living in a tower. She paints and reads… She’s a Renaissance woman".
- Toph Beifong – fictional character in the animated television series Avatar: The Last Airbender and The Legend of Korra. As a powerful earthbender who was born blind, she compensates for it by feeling the vibrations of the Earth, which is why she is perpetually barefoot.
- Cricket Green – central protagonist of the animated series Big City Greens. He is almost always barefoot, which is one of his personal convictions as seen in the episode "No Service".
- Nisa – one of the main characters in the animated series Mission Odyssey, a clairvoyant teenage girl who is perpetually barefoot.
- Jack Frost – protagonist of Rise of the Guardians.

=== Live-action TV series ===
- Kwai Chang Caine – protagonist of Kung Fu (1972–1975), a peace-loving Shaolin monk. His actor David Carradine, himself renowned as a barefooter, insisted that the character should not wear shoes.
- Neri and Mera from Ocean Girl – alien girls coming from a planet known as the Ocean Planet where footwear is not a feature of their species' civilisation.
- River Tam – a main female character from the Firefly franchise who goes barefoot so often that the show's creator Joss Whedon described her feet as the show's eleventh character in the Serenity DVD commentary.
- Joe Hart – supporting character from Glee, a spiritual, free-spirited high school student. His habit of going barefoot was inspired by the actor Samuel Larsen's real-life preference for going barefoot when he was in high school.
- Boy Kavalier – major character in Alien: Earth. As a child prodigy and the CEO of the Prodigy Corporation, he goes barefoot to demonstrate his carefree personality and his feeling of superiority to others around him. His barefoot appearance is inspired by real-life entrepreneurs like Steve Jobs and Mark Zuckerberg.
- Nahla Ake – major character in Star Trek: Starfleet Academy. Serving as the current Chancellor of the Starfleet Academy, Ake is renowned for her eccentricity and informality, including a tendency to be barefoot while on bridge. Holly Hunter, the actress portraying Ake, said that her character's "barefoot thing was something that Alex [Kurtzman] had put in the script that I just loved, and it kind of snowballed from there".

=== Video games ===
- Ryu and Juri Han – fighters from the Street Fighter franchise.
- Kotomi Ichinose – a character in the visual novel Clannad, an eccentric genius girl who has a habit of going barefoot.
- Katrina – a vampire sorceress, a secondary antagonist, and the protagonist's possible love interest in Quest for Glory: Shadows of Darkness and Quest for Glory V: Dragon Fire.
- Voodoo Lady – supporting character in The Secret of Monkey Island and Monkey Island 2: LeChuck's Revenge.
- Elika – main female character in the 2008 Prince of Persia game.
- Queen Jennah – the Queen of Kryta in Guild Wars 2.
- Corrin and Azura – the two protagonists of Fire Emblem Fates.
- Games developed by FromSoftware are renowned for a large number of barefoot characters. This includes the Maiden in Black from Demon's Souls, Sister Friede, Gwynevere, and Priscilla from the Dark Souls series, Malenia from Elden Ring, and Kuro from Sekiro: Shadows Die Twice. Elden Ring even has a Steam guide called "The Many Feet of The Lands Between".
- Most (if not all) characters in the Hades series who have visible feet are barefoot. This includes Zagreus and Melinoë, the protagonists of Hades and Hades II respectively.
- Rin Tezuka – a character in the visual novel Katawa Shoujo who was born without arms and uses her feet to perform everyday tasks.
- Yunli and Clara – playable characters in Honkai: Star Rail.
- Xal'atath – ancient void entity, often seen embodied as a levitating elf in World of Warcraft: The War Within.
- Lune – mage from Clair Obscur: Expedition 33. While her unlockable costumes tend to include shoes, her default costume does not. Other party members can be barefoot depending on the selected costume (typically the swimwear ones), while the character of Cléa Dessendre goes barefoot in both her normal and mirror versions.

== Notes ==
=== Bibliography ===
- Dudley, Donald R. (1937). A History of Cynicism from Diogenes to the 6th Century A.D. Cambridge.
