= Traversal =

Traversal may refer to:

- Graph traversal, checking and/or changing each vertex in a graph
  - Tree traversal, checking and/or changing each node in a tree data structure
- NAT traversal, establishing and maintaining Internet protocol connections in a computer network, across gateways that implement network address translation

== See also ==
- Traverse (disambiguation)
