= Traverse Bay =

Traverse Bay may refer to a number of articles relating to the geography of the Great Lakes region:

== Bays ==
Lake Michigan

- Grand Traverse Bay
  - East (Arm) Grand Traverse Bay
  - West (Arm) Grand Traverse Bay
- Little Traverse Bay

Lake Superior

- Grand Traverse Bay (Lake Superior)
- Little Traverse Bay (Lake Superior)

== Other ==
- Traverse Bay Blues Rugby Football Club
- Traverse Bay Area Intermediate School District
  - Traverse Bay Area Career Tech Center

== See also ==
- Traverse (disambiguation)
