= Traverser =

Traverser may refer to:

- Traverser (band), an American progressive/alternative band
- Transfer table, in railway terminology
- Container crane, in marine/shipping terminology
