= Traverse =

Traverse may refer to:

== Places ==
- Traverse, Michigan, an unincorporated community
- Traverse City, Michigan
- Traverse County, Minnesota, a county in Minnesota

== Other ==
- Traverse (climbing), moving horizontally on a climbing or mountaineering route
  - Tyrolean traverse, a climbing rope-technique to cross a chasam
- Traverse (fortification), a mass of earth behind a military parapet
- Traverse (gunnery), the horizontal field of fire of an artillery piece
- Traverse (magazine), a Northern Michigan regional monthly
- TRAVERSE (software), accounting and business software
- Traverse (surveying), a method of establishing basic points in the field
- Traverse (trench warfare), a development in trench design
- Movement of a machine slide on a machine tool
- Traverse stage, a style of theatre seating or performance
- Traverse Theatre, a writing theatre in Scotland
- Traverse Town, a fictional city in some Kingdom Hearts series video games
- Chevrolet Traverse, a 2009 sport-utility vehicle
- Traverse (common law), a pleading which alleges that a fact previously alleged by an adversary is untrue or is made without adequate knowledge

== See also ==
- Grand Traverse (disambiguation)
- Traverse Bay (disambiguation)
- Traverser (disambiguation)
