= Grand Traverse =

Grand Traverse may refer to any of the following topics related to the state of Michigan, United States:

- Grand Traverse Band of Ottawa and Chippewa Indians, a Native American tribe
- Grand Traverse Bay, a bay of Lake Michigan in the Lower Peninsula
  - Grand Traverse Bay Bottomland Preserve, a preservation area that encompasses the bay
- Grand Traverse College, a 19th-century college in Benzonia
- Grand Traverse County, Michigan
- Grand Traverse Light, a lighthouse on the Leelanau Peninsula, Lower Peninsula
- Grand Traverse Mall, an enclosed shopping mall in Traverse City
- Grand Traverse Regional Land Conservancy, a non-profit organization in Traverse City
- Grand Traverse Resort & Spa, a resort and meeting center in Acme Township, Michigan
- Chateau Grand Traverse, a winery near Traverse City

== See also ==
- Traverse (disambiguation)
