= Voldemārs Irbe =

Latvian painter (1893–1944)

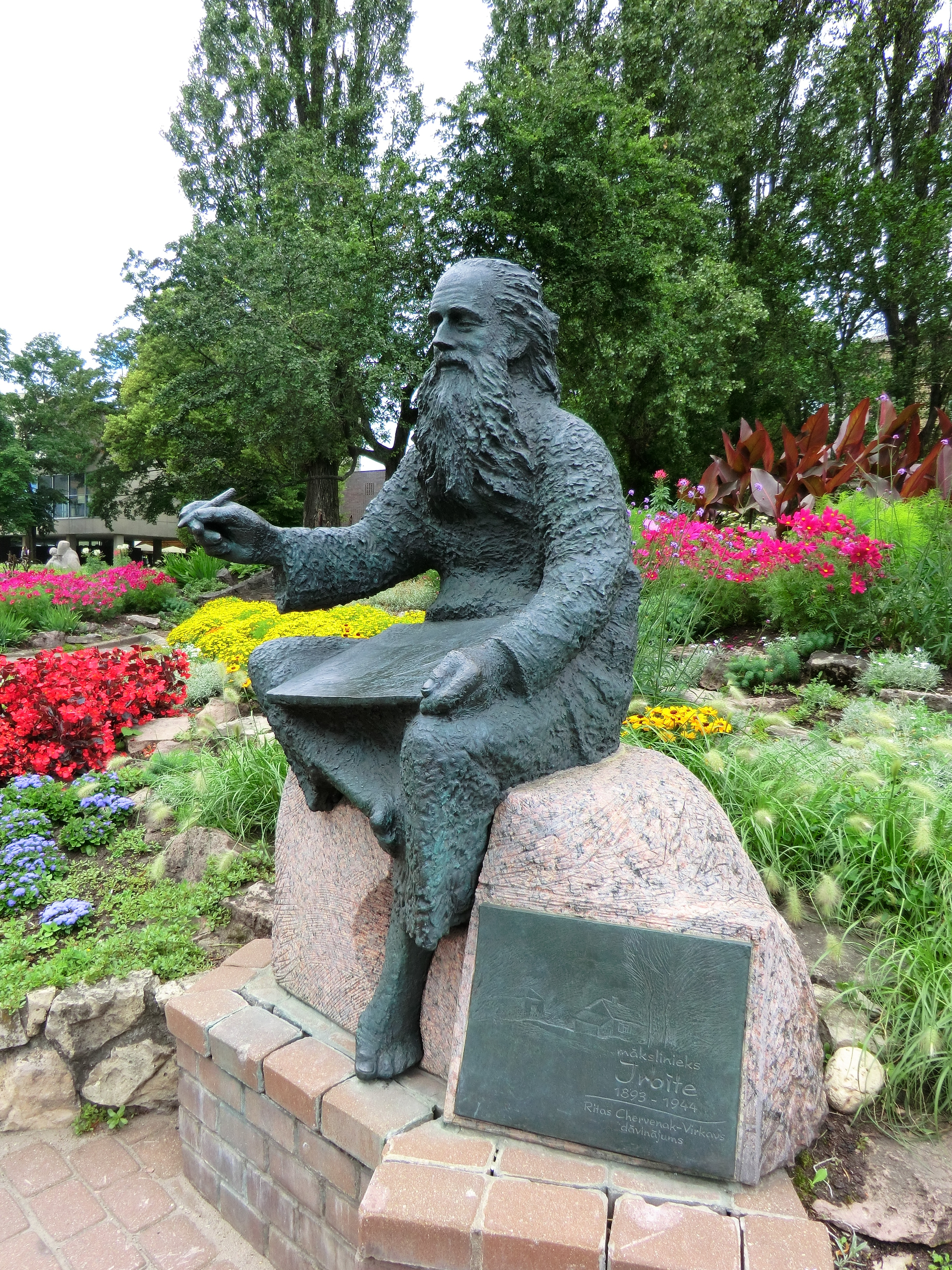
- Statue of Voldemārs Irbe in Riga, depicted disheveled and barefoot in accordance with his real-life appearance
- Born: 13 November 1893; Beļava Parish, Governorate of Livonia, Russian Empire
- Died: 10 October 1944 (aged 50); Riga, Latvia
- Resting place: Pokrov Cemetery
- Known for: Pastel art

Voldemārs Irbe (13 November 1893 – 10 October 1944) was a Latvian pastel painter, active in Riga throughout the 1920s and 1930s. Though he was well known for his odd behavior and disheveled appearance, leading him to be nicknamed "Barefoot Irbīte", Irbe's work was acclaimed by the Latvian art world both during and after his lifetime.

== Life ==
In 1893, Irbe was born to a highly religious family in the Beļava Parish of Latvia's Valka district. After his family moved to Riga in 1904, Irbe enrolled in school, but he performed poorly and only showed interest in theology. Irbe's brother Jacob, noting Irbe's poor scholastic performance and interest in art, encouraged him to enroll in an art school instead. Consequently, Irbe entered the Drawing and Painting School at the Riga Decorative Painters' Art Society. Irbe took to art much more than he had to traditional schooling, and after his graduation he began working in the studio of Jūlijs Madernieks.

After the 1915 suicide of his father, Irbe took up employment at a local Orthodox monastery. The monastery was subsequently evacuated to the interior of Russia to avoid the dangers of World War I; Irbe accompanied them during these travels, which led him to see the cities of St. Petersburg and Moscow. Impressed by the art he saw in those cities, Irbe next attempted to travel to Egypt. However, this venture was unsuccessful, and he ultimately decided to return to Riga in 1919. Irbe was summoned for military service, but due to his personal convictions against violence, he was unwilling to serve; consequently, he declared himself "an idiot" so that he could be found mentally unfit for the army. Instead, Irbe pursued employment as an art teacher. He made three attempts to pursue a teaching career, but each proved unsuccessful due to his eccentric behavior and habitually shabby clothing.

After giving up on teaching, Irbe began to make a living by selling art. Most of the works he sold were very small pieces, as little as 3 × 4 cm, which Irbe could create quickly and sell for small amounts of money. Irbe also held private exhibitions of his art in the 1920s, which took place at his personal workshop. These exhibitions eventually earned Irbe some attention: in 1929 the Riga City Art Museum (today the Latvian National Museum of Art) bought more than 50 of his works. In addition to his art, Irbe was interested in sharing his philosophical views, which he did through public lectures and short books. However, Irbe's low level of education prevented him from expressing his views lucidly, and so he never achieved much note in this field.

He also illustrated E. T. A. Hoffmann's book "Ritter Gluck" published by the publishing house Zelta Ābele. He has painted frescoes of the Latvian Orthodox Church of the Ascension in Riga.

During World War II, Riga was frequently bombed; Irbe was killed in one such bombing in 1944. A statue of Irbe was later erected near the site of his death.

== Personality ==
Irbe was renowned for his eccentricity. He wore dirty, ragged clothing and purportedly only bathed once a year. He also traveled barefoot everywhere, and claimed that he could paint a complete piece while standing on one foot. Because of his dirty condition, the Riga police once forcibly washed Irbe and cut his hair and beard; when this occurred, Irbe was already a well-known figure in the city, and so the "forced washing" incident was reported in Latvian newspapers. Irbe was devoutly religious, and was also interested in philosophy. He frequently shared his opinions at lectures and public debates, and even held philosophical lectures of his own. Irbe was also a vegetarian and a teetotaler who lived a simple lifestyle.

== Artistic style ==
Irbe was best acclaimed for his pastel work. Described as "the first serious master of pastel painting in Latvian art", he was praised for his vibrant use of color and bold brushwork. He was known for the speed of his work, which sometimes led him to be criticized for carelessness; however, Irbe was widely praised by his fellow artists, including Vilhelms Purvītis, Jūlijs Madernieks, and Kārlis Neilis.
