= Phil Thiel =

US international rugby union player

Phillip Thiel
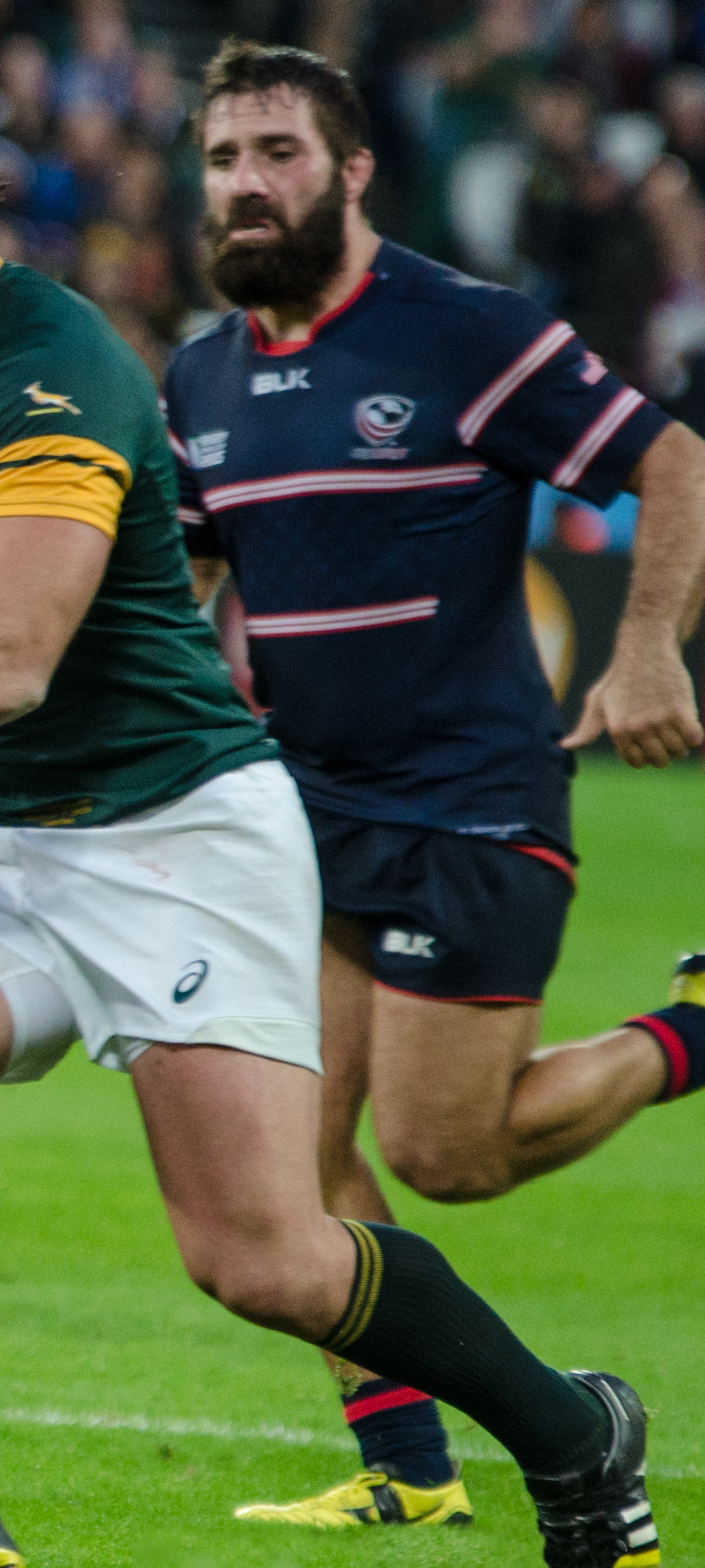
- Born: Phillip Thiel; October 29, 1984 (age 42) Traverse City, Michigan, U.S.
- Height: 1.80 m (5 ft 11 in)
- Weight: 113 kg (249 lb; 17 st 11 lb)

Rugby union career
- Position(s): Prop, Hooker
- Current team: Life University
Amateur team(s)
Years	Team	Apps	(Points)
- Life University
–	Traverse Bay Blues RFC		
Senior career
Years	Team	Apps	(Points)
	Cinderford	9	(10)
2014	Saracens	0	(0)
International career
Years	Team	Apps	(Points)
2009–2015	United States	36	(5)
- Correct as of 11 October 2015

Phillip Thiel (born October 29, 1984) is a former American rugby union player who currently coaches Atlanta Old White rugby football Club and played for Life University Men's Senior Rugby Club in the American Rugby Premiership as a hooker and prop.

== Club career ==
After taking nearly 18 months off, Thiel returned to play for Life University for the 2013 Division 1 and Elite Cup Series and was selected to represent Life University rugby at the Rugby Showdown against the Golden Lions as a member of the North American All-Stars before the event was canceled. In August 2014 Thiel signed a short-term deal with Saracens.

== International career ==
His debut with the Eagles was in November 2009 against Uruguay. He was selected to play with the USA Eagles for the 2011 and 2015 World Cups. Thiel co-captained the USA Eagles Select team at the 2013 Americas Rugby Championship where the Eagles finished second.
