= Zelta Ābele =

Latvian publishing house

Zelta Ābele is a Latvian publishing house. It was established in 1935. During the Soviet occupation from 1940 to autumn 1941, the publishing house was closed, but it reopened during the German occupation. Later, Miķelis Goppers emigrated to Sweden, where he re-established Zelta ābele in 1945. The publishing house continued its activities until 1985.

In total, the publishing house published 116 books, 50 of which were published by 1940, and the remaining 66 during the German occupation and later in exile in Sweden. "Zelta ābele published works by Aspazija, Jānis Akurateras, Ernest Birznieks-Upītis, Rudolfs Blaumanis, Viļlis Plūdonis, Jānis Poruks, Anšlavs Eglītis and others, as well as translations of foreign literature, memoirs, cartographic editions and other works. In 1942, the publishing house launched a collection of photographs "Baigais gads". During the Soviet occupation from 1940 to autumn 1941, the publishing house was closed, but it reopened during the German occupation. Later, Miķelis Goppers emigrated to Sweden, where he re-established Zelta ābele in 1945. The publishing house continued its activities until 1985.
