= Traverser (band) =

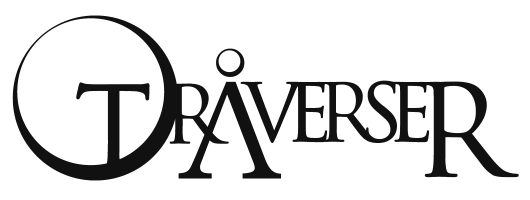

Background information
- Origin: Orlando, Florida, United States
- Genres: Progressive rock
- Years active: 2004–present
- Members: David Medairos; David (DC) Shaw; Jon Shaffer; Rick Garitta
- Past members: Robert Spence
- Website: traverser.band

Traverser is a progressive rock band formed in 2004. The band is known for their use of visual art, and conceptually oriented songs and lyrics. Their live performances often include samples of pre-recorded audio to imply a storyline or theme to the audience. The band wrote and performed as a trio until October 2009 when Jon Shaffer, former guitarist for 7 Blue Skies, joined the band as a permanent second guitarist. Traverser has appeared at several major venues and events in central Florida including the 2009 Florida Music Festival The band began touring in 2011 in support of the re-release of their self-titled debut.

== Members ==
Current

- David Medairos - Lead Vocals/Guitar
- David (DC) Shaw - Drums
- Jon Shaffer - Guitar/Vocals
- Rick Garitta - Bass/Vocals

Former

- Robert Spence - Bass (2004 - 2014)

== Discography ==
=== Albums ===
- Traverser - (2009)
- Telemetry - (2010)
- Redshift - (2012)
- Jupiter Doesn't Care About You - (2019)

=== DVDs ===
- Traversing The Blue Skies - 2009 Independent Release

=== Singles ===
Year	Song	Album
2010	"EMD"	Telemetry
2014	"Atlas"	Redshift
2019	"Star Faux"	Jupiter Doesn't Care About You
2019	"Target Practice"	Jupiter Doesn't Care About You
