= Traverse Bay Blues Rugby Football Club =

Sport team

(United States) Traverse Bay Blues Rugby Football Club
- Union: USA Rugby, Michigan Rugby Union, Division III
- Founded: 1973; 52 years ago
- Location: Grand Traverse Civic Center, Traverse City, MI
- President: Tony Dell'Acqua
- Coach(es): Matt Szatkiewicz
- Captain(s): Kevin Kipke
- League(s): Midwest Rugby Division III, EAST - NORTH Conference

Official website
- www.tcrugby.com

The Traverse Bay Blues Rugby Football Club (Traverse Bay Blues RFC) is a rugby union team founded in 1973 from Traverse City, Michigan that is a part of the Grand Traverse Rugby Club. It is a member of USA Rugby, Division III Midwest Rugby Eastern Conference, Northern League, and Division III of the Michigan Rugby Football Union. It holds the Cherry Pit Rugby 15's Tournament annually in August and has over 200 members.

== Notable players ==
- Phil Thiel Hooker/Prop for the USA Eagles 2008-2011, 2013–2015
- Tony Dell'Acqua All Army Selects 89-91; Combined Services 90'
- Cornel Olivier South African born/ All Midwest Select 2000
- Jack Weathers All Marine Selects 88-90; Combined Services 90, 91'
- Coen Stassen South African Born/ All Midwest Select 2002
- Dan Farrier All Army Sevens 2008
- Bob Brick Founder 1973
