= Wojciech Cejrowski =

Far right conspiracy theorist

Wojciech Cejrowski FRGS
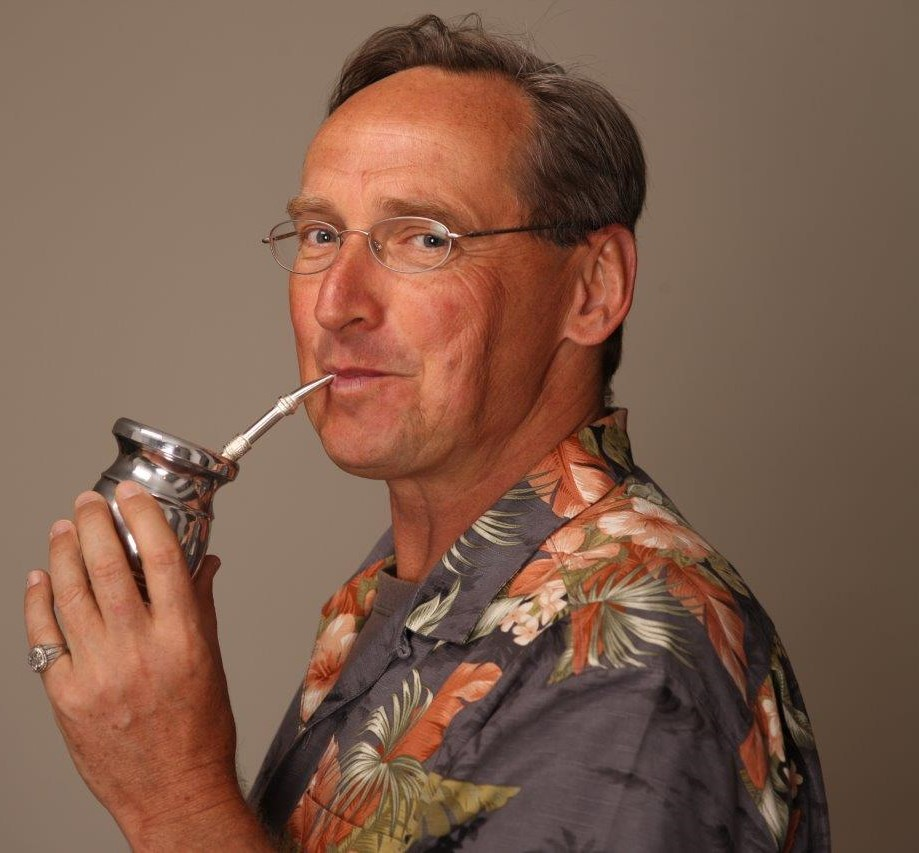
- Portrait of Cejrowski, 2020
- Born: Wojciech Daniel Cejrowski; 1964 (age 61–62); Polish People's Republic
- Education: Catholic University of Lublin
- Occupations: Travel writer, journalist
- Known for: Travel TV show
- Parents: Stanisław Cejrowski (father); Katarzyna Cejrowska (mother)
- Website: cejrowski.com

Wojciech Daniel Cejrowski (born 1964 in Kociewie) is a Polish radio journalist, satirist, photographer, travel writer, artistic director of the Discover World library, and a member of The Explorers Club.

== Early life and education ==
Cejrowski's family is from the ethnocultural region of Kociewie, where he spent his early years. Although, in a 2013 interview, he stated that he has encountered four conflicting locations for his place of birth on the internet and refuses to reveal his true place of birth over privacy concerns.

Cejrowski graduated from the 17th general education liceum in Warsaw. In 2010 he received a BA in sociology from the Catholic University of Lublin. Cejrowski also studied without graduating at Aleksander Zelwerowicz State Theatre Academy; University of Warsaw, Santa Clara University.

== Career ==
=== Radio ===
Cejrowski started his radio career in 1991 – along with Korneliusz Pacuda he conducted the program Czy jest miejsce na country w Polsce? (transl. Is There a Place for country music in Poland?). One of its results was a contract with the American Broadcasting Company – from 1992 all Polish local broadcasting stations had started to broadcast Polish versions of American Country Countdown. Wojciech Cejrowski (initially alongside Pacuda) hosted this broadcast for eleven years. The very last one (№ 519) was broadcast in January 2003. In 1993 Cejrowski was offered a job by Wojciech Mann and Krzysztof Materna, owners of the private radio station Radio Kolor (transl. Radio Color). First he hosted his own music programme then also Aeroplan (transl. Airplane) together with Beata Pawlikowska and then his morning programme (every Saturday from 6 to 10 am – which later gave the beginning to WC Kwadrans). His cooperation with Radio Kolor ended in 1997 (soon after Mann and Materna left the radio station). He worked for Radio WAW-a for the next 3 years (1997–1999).

Cejrowski's radio broadcasts can currently be found in various broadcasting stations in Poland. The best known is his travel cycle Po drugiej stronie globusa (transl. On the Other Side of the Globe) – more than 300 episodes were broadcast by Radio Station 1, Radio dla Ciebie, Radio Koszalin, Radio Merkury, Radio PiK and Radio Network PLUS. He also works for Polskie Radio Program I. He sends his correspondences from foreign countries for Z pierwszej ręki (transl. First Hand) and Radio Kierowców (transl. The Driver's Radio) and his traveler's stories for Lato z Radiem (transl. Summer with Radio). During the 2005 winter season Cejrowski hosted the Zima z radiową Jedynką (transl. Winter with Radio Station One). In the meantime, since 2003 he has been creating music broadcasts on the demand of the Music Editorial Office – Muzyka na Molo (transl. Music on the Pier) and Audycja podzwrotnikowa (transl. Subtropical Broadcast).

=== Television ===
WC Kwadrans (transl. WC Fifteen Minutes) broadcast by the public Polish TV (TVP) (1994–1996) is his most widely known TV programme. The show was watched by three million viewers.

Cejrowski started his TV career by cooperating with Wojciech Mann in his Non Stop Kolor show (transl. Non-stop Color) broadcast on TVP (1992–1994). He was also the host of the Stajnia show (transl. The Stable) broadcast by the TVP and some local TV stations. Between 1996 and 1997 Cejrowski recorded a series of 30 episodes reporting on his journey to South America for TV Niepokalanów.

From 1997, Cejrowski, along with Jan Pietrzak, Jan Tadeusz Stanisławski, Krzysztof Daukszewicz and others, participated in a satirical talk show broadcast on RTL 7 focused on various aspects of daily life in Poland. Between 1999 and 2000 Cejrowski co-hosted, alongside Alicja Resich-Modlińska, the talk show Piękny i Bestia (transl. Beauty and the Beast).

While at Polsat (2003–4) Cejrowski hosted his own show Z kamerą wśród ludzi (With Camera Amongst the People) also broadcast by TV 4 and Polsat 2.

In 2007 Cejrowski started his popular Barefoot Around the World travel show (Boso przez świat).

== Writing ==
Cejrowski writes and publishes quite a lot on social and political situations, including columns in Gazeta Polska, Tygodnik AWS, and Ilustrowany Kurier Polski, and on travel, including humorous reports in Newsweek, Rzeczpospolita, Poznaj Świat and others.

=== Political humor ===
- Kołtun się jeży (Mophead Stands on End)
- Młot na lewicę (The Hammer for the Left)
- Sól do oka (Salt into an Eye)

=== Travel writing ===
- Podróżnik WC (Traveler WC)
- Na końcu Orinoko (At the Orinoco's End)
- Gringo wśród dzikich plemion (Gringo Among the Wild Tribes)
- Rio Anaconda
- Wyspa na prerii (Island in the Prairie)

== Controversy ==
In a 1995 article, titled Brunatny kowboj RP (transl. Brown cowboy of the Republic of Poland), printed in Gazeta Wyborcza, the journalist Anna Bikont accused Cejrowski of promoting fascism through his TVP show WC Kwadrans. Cejrowski subsequently attempted to sue the paper for libel. A Warsaw court judged that, whilst the content of the article itself was not libellous, the use of the word 'brown', with pejorative connotations relating to the Brownshirts, in the article's title was. However, Cejrowski eventually lost his case on appeal. Cejrowski's own colleagues at TVP also criticised his apparent promotion of fascist ideology on the television network, with one comparing him to Joseph Goebbels. Whilst arguing for a dictatorship on his show WC Kwadrans, Cejrowski has been described as the "media personality who first brought extreme right-wing views to a large national audience" in Poland. As the host of WC Kwadrans, Cejrowski has been described as an overt misogynist and antisemite.

Cejrowski is Poland's most prominent journalist to openly advocate against the LGBTQ rights movement. In his rhetoric, Cejrowski refers to LGBTQ people as "sodomites", "buggers", and "paederasts". In his article for Dziennik, he has written that he "prefers savages over gay parades". Cejrowski states that European society is overwhelmingly against homosexuality, and advocates for the creation of a nationwide network of homosexuality clinics aiming to 'alter this disgusting behavior'. He says that "gay people should be pointed at, as the sin of sodomy evokes disgust".

In April 2008, Cejrowski announced his intention to abandon his Polish citizenship and acquire the Ecuadorian one instead, due to his disenchantment with the European Union, citing high taxes and problems with obtaining visas.

The Centre for Strategic Communication and Information Security has identified his YouTube account as a notable propagator of Russian disinformation in Poland. He has been listed in the Brown Book of the "Never Again" Association, compiled to monitor neo-fascism in Poland, the group has also highlighted his racist promotion of 5G and COVID-19 conspiracy theories. In 2018 the Rainbow Project condemned a scheduled appearance by Cejrowski at Belfast’s Strand Arts Centre due to his history of homophobia, Islamophobia and misogyny.

In April 2021 a right-wing magazine Do Rzeczy published an interview with Cejrowski, wherein he expressed his contempt for the Black Lives Matter movement and his belief in the superiority of Christianity and Western civilization.

=== Religion ===
Cejrowski is a hard line traditional Catholic. He has stated that as far as the Bible is concerned, he prefers The Old Testament – he likes when God is speaking to him directly, telling him what is good and what is sinful, and what to do. He is also a known critic of the former Pope Francis, calling him a satanist.

Cejrowski is strongly against abortion. In one interview he said: "I wish abortion clinics could burn down and abortion providers get shot".

== See also ==
- Janusz Korwin-Mikke
