= 7 Blue Skies =

American alternative rock band

- Origin: Orlando, Florida, USA
- Genre: Alternative rock
- Years active: 2004–2009
- Label: E-Klectrik Music Group
- Members: Rick Garitta – Lead vocals/Guitar; Jon Shaffer – Vocals/Guitar; Andy Stickel – Bass; Kris Ramsay – Drums
- Past members: Adam Schulman – Guitar

7 Blue Skies was an alternative rock band formed in 2004. The band has since broken up.

== Band name ==
The band's name was chosen following an email from producer Ron Saint Germain, in which Germain signed off "Good luck, 7 blue skies!" The band determined the name to mean "have a nice week," and decided to use the name. This was later revealed to be a typo, as the intended line was "Good luck & blue skies!" (the & is located above the 7 key).

== History ==
Jon Shaffer, Adam Schulman and Andy Stickel formed the band and posted an ad online for a singer and drummer in 2004. Ramsay and Garitta responded to the ad and arranged a rehearsal and from there the band was born. The group entered the studio to begin recording what would be their first release 'Exhausted' in May 2004 with producers Sam Verella and Jason Laughton.

The album was released in the summer of 2005, and saw sales of several thousand copies. The album attracted the attention of Mike Grippo, an A&R from E-Klectrik Music Group, a division of the GoDigital Media Group. On February 28, 2007 the group signed to E-Klectrik Music Group and began working on their next release, "Last Night."

Although failing to appear in the Billboard Charts, "Last Night" saw strong sales with more than 20,000 units shipped in its first week, and was greeted by fans at a sold out album release concert at The Social in Orlando, Florida on July 7, 2007 (07/07/07). The event was dubbed by Axis Magazine as one of the top ten events in Orlando in the summer of 2007.

== Schulman's departure ==
In March 2008 the group left E-Klectrik Music Group and parted ways with guitarist Adam Schulman. Upon Schulman's departure, Rick Garitta began playing guitar in addition to continuing to provide lead vocals. Schulman was the only member of the band to not perform barefoot.

== Promotional videos ==
The group frequently uploads homemade promotional videos. On St. Patrick's Day of 2009 the group uploaded a video of guitarist Jon Shaffer and bassist Andy Stickel waking singer Rick Garitta up with a leaf blower. This video is a follow-up to the Kung Fu parody released less than two weeks prior, featuring Rick Garitta and Andy Stickel squaring off with Dave Medairos of the band Traverser. These videos can be found on the group's YouTube and Vimeo pages.

== Appearances in film and television ==
The group's music has been featured in movies and television shows around the world. In early 2009, the group was featured on The Edge television show. The group can also be frequently heard on the soundtracks of many European television shows. Most recently, Disappearing Act was included on the Belgian television show Shockproof.

In 2008, the song AOS and was included on the soundtrack of Loaded (2008) starring Jesse Metcalfe.

== Sponsorships ==
Jon Shaffer is currently sponsored by Fryette Amplification and Andy Stickel is sponsored by Warwick basses, although he began playing Ernie Ball basses in 2008.

== Planned third album ==
In a late 2008 interview with MTV, Rick Garitta confirmed that the band was recording its third full-length album.

== Discography ==
=== Albums ===
- Exhausted – 2005 Independent Release
- Last Night – 2007 E-Klectrik Music Group

=== DVDs ===
- 7 Blue Skies – Live @ The Social – 2008 Independent Release
- Traversing The Blue Skies – Date TBD Independent Release

=== Singles ===
Year	Song	Album
2006	"Exhausted"	Exhausted
2007	"Last Night"	Last Night
2007	"Waiting"	Last Night
