= Narnia: The Magician's Nephew =

Upcoming film by Greta Gerwig

- Teaser poster
- Directed by: Greta Gerwig
- Screenplay by: Greta Gerwig
- Based on: The Magician's Nephew by C. S. Lewis
- Produced by: Mark Gordon; Amy Pascal; Vincent Sieber-Smith; Greta Gerwig
- Starring: David McKenna; Beatrice Campbell; Emma Mackey; Carey Mulligan; Ciarán Hinds; Daniel Craig; Meryl Streep
- Cinematography: Seamus McGarvey
- Edited by: Nick Houy; Andrew Weisblum
- Music by: Mark Ronson; Andrew Wyatt
- Production companies: The C.S. Lewis Company; eOne Films; Pascal Pictures; NB/GG Pictures; Midnight Road Entertainment
- Distributed by: Netflix (United States and Canada); Columbia Pictures (through Sony Pictures Releasing International; International) (Note: Netflix has licensed international theatrical rights to this film to Sony Pictures Releasing; the deal excludes China, Belarus, Russia, and notably France, where Netflix will premiere it direct-to-streaming.)
- Release dates: February 12, 2027 (United States); April 2, 2027 (Netflix)
- Countries: United States; United Kingdom
- Language: English
- Budget: $200–250 million

Narnia: The Magician's Nephew is an upcoming epic high fantasy film written for the screen, directed, and co-produced by Greta Gerwig, based on the 1955 novel The Magician's Nephew, the sixth published and first chronological novel in the children's book series The Chronicles of Narnia by C. S. Lewis. It will be the fourth film adaptation based on the The Chronicles of Narnia series of novels, following a trilogy of films produced by Walden Media. It stars David McKenna, Beatrice Campbell, Emma Mackey, Carey Mulligan, Ciarán Hinds, Daniel Craig, and Meryl Streep.

Following IMAX and other premium large format previews on February 10, 2027, Narnia: The Magician's Nephew is scheduled to be released wide theatrically by Netflix and Sony Pictures Releasing on February 12, before streaming on April 2. It is set to be the first film by Netflix to receive a global wide theatrical release.

== Cast ==
- David McKenna as Digory Kirke
  - Ciarán Hinds as the voice of elder Digory Kirke
- Beatrice Campbell as Polly Plummer
- Emma Mackey as Jadis, the future White Witch and the last Queen of Charn
- Carey Mulligan as Flora Kirke, Digory's mother
- Daniel Craig as Andrew Ketterley, Digory's uncle
- Meryl Streep as Aslan, the great lion who was responsible for creating Narnia.
- Kobna Holdbrook-Smith as Frank, a London cabby who becomes the First King of Narnia
- Denise Gough
- Susan Wokoma
- Tom Bonington as Mr. Potts
- Ava Jager as Violet Plummer, Polly's sister
- Gerard Monaco
- James Murray
- Samantha Spiro

== Production ==
=== Background ===
After Walden Media's film rights to The Chronicles of Narnia expired in 2011, the C. S. Lewis Company announced in October 2013 that it had agreed with the Mark Gordon Company to adapt the 1953 novel The Silver Chair. Mark Gordon and Douglas Gresham, along with Vincent Sieber, the Los Angeles based director of the C. S. Lewis Company, would serve as producers and work with the Mark Gordon Company on developing the script. In December 2013, it was announced that David Magee would write the screenplay. In July 2014, the official Narnia website allowed the opportunity for fans to suggest names for the Lady of the Green Kirtle, the main antagonist. The winning name was to be selected by Gordon and Magee for use in the final script of The Silver Chair.

The producers called the film a "reboot" due to the fact that it had a new creative team not associated with those who worked on the previous three films, although it was still a narrative successor to them. In August 2016, it was announced that TriStar Pictures and Entertainment One were set to finance and distribute the fourth film with the Mark Gordon Company (which eOne owned) and the C. S. Lewis Company. In April 2017, it was announced that Joe Johnston had been hired to direct The Silver Chair. During an interview with Red Carpet News TV, Gordon revealed scarce details about the new technologies and setting that would be used for the upcoming film.

=== Development ===
On 3 October 2018, Netflix and eOne made a multi-year deal with the C.S. Lewis Company to produce films and TV programs based on The Chronicles of Narnia. On June 12, 2019, Gordon hired Coco co-writer Matthew Aldrich to be the creative architect of the Netflix adaptation.

On 3 July 2023, following the release of Barbie, it was announced that Greta Gerwig had signed a deal with Netflix to write and direct two films based on the book series The Chronicles of Narnia, with Gordon, Douglas Gresham, Amy Pascal, and Sieber serving as producers. Pascal said in December 2024 that filming was expected to start in July 2025. The Times reported in December 2024 that filming would take place at Shepperton Studios. That same month, Jason Isaacs revealed that Gerwig was rumored to be adapting The Magician's Nephew for the first film.

In March and April 2025, listings from Production Weekly and Production List referred to the production as Narnia: The Magician's Nephew. The film was confirmed to be adapting The Magician's Nephew in mid-2025, with the full title being Narnia: The Magician's Nephew.

=== Casting ===
Open casting calls for a young boy and young girl to star in the film were quietly released in January 2025. In March 2025, Charli XCX was in talks to join the film, while Daniel Craig had been offered a role. In early April 2025, it was reported that Meryl Streep was in talks to voice Aslan, though the casting was not confirmed until the following year. Later that month, Emma Mackey was cast as the White Witch over Margaret Qualley and Charli XCX. In May 2025, Carey Mulligan was cast as Flora Kirke. In July 2025, David McKenna, Beatrice Campbell and Tom Bonington joined the cast. In September 2025, Denise Gough comfirmed she joined the cast. In October, Craig's casting was confirmed and Ava Jager joined the cast. In February 2026, Susan Wokoma, Gerard Monaco, James Murray, and Samantha Spiro were revealed as a part of the cast. In May 2026, it was revealed that Ciarán Hinds and Kobna Holdbrook-Smith had rounded out the cast.

=== Filming ===
Principal photography began on August 11, 2025, with location filming around Bank Station and the Royal Exchange in London, Chelsea Physic Garden and set filming at Shepperton Studios, with Seamus McGarvey serving as the cinematographer. Further scenes were shot in the Castlefield area of Manchester the same month. By October 1, with location shooting complete, studio filming at Shepperton and Longcross Studios was expected to continue to December 2025. Filming concluded on January 31, 2026. According to Deadline Hollywood, a cast member sustained an injury during filming, which caused a production delay of six weeks.

=== Post-production ===
In October 2025, it was reported that Mark Ronson and Andrew Wyatt were co-composing the film's score, after having previously collaborated with Gerwig on Barbie. Visual effects are by Framestore, Weta FX, Eyeline and beloFX, supervised by production VFX Supervisor Paul Franklin and Production VFX Producer, Barry St John.

== Release ==
Narnia: The Magician's Nephew is scheduled to be released theatrically worldwide excluding France on February 12, 2027, before streaming on Netflix on April 2, 2027. The film is set to be Netflix's first wide theatrical release and first foray into releasing a movie into theaters exclusively for a minimum of 45 days. It was previously scheduled to release exclusively on 1,000 IMAX screens on November 26, 2026, followed by a debut on Netflix on December 25, 2026, before The Further Mis-Adventures of Cliff Booth (2026) took over those release dates.

In June 2026, it was announced that Sony Pictures would be handling international theatrical distribution on the film. In July 2026, Netflix announced that the film would forgo a theatrical release in France due to local regulations that would prevent the film from becoming available on the streaming service in France until 17 months following a theatrical release and would instead premiere on the service in France on April 2. It was also revealed that Sony's deal for international rights would extend only to territories outside North America and France where Netflix operates, meaning China, Belarus and Russia would be excluded from the pact.

=== Marketing ===
On September 17, 2026, Empire magazine shared images of Aslan for the film. Days following, Empire released articles containing 9 stills from the film, which revealed a first look at Uncle Andrew, Jadis, Digory, Polly, Frank, and Strawberry.

The first official trailer was released on October 13, 2026. Within a few days, the views on the trailer surpassed trailer views for Barbie, The Super Mario Galaxy Movie, Wonka, and Project Hail Mary with 481 million views. The trailer features the 1971 song "Stairway to Heaven" by Led Zeppelin.
