= Stephen Thorne =

British actor (1935–2019)

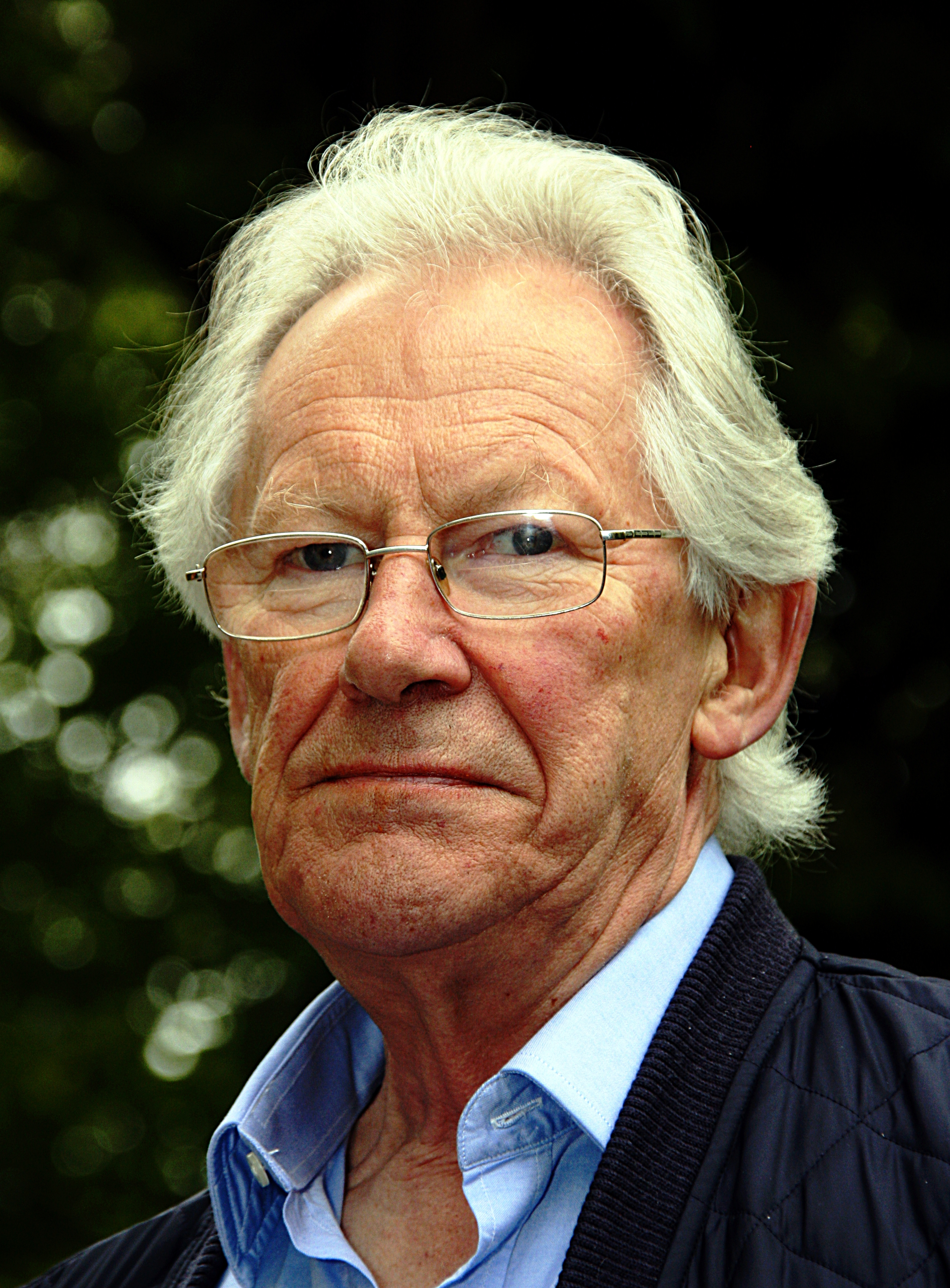
- Thorne in 2011
- Born: 2 March 1935; London, England
- Died: 26 May 2019 (aged 84)
- Education: Liverpool College; RADA
- Occupation: Actor
- Years active: 1958–2019
- Height: 6 ft 4 in (1.93 m)
- Spouse: Barbara Sykes (m. 1958)
- Children: 2

Stephen John Thorne (2 March 1935 – 26 May 2019) was a British actor of radio, film, stage, and television. He was best known for his regular BBC Radio 4 work and audiobook recordings, and for his portrayals of a few Doctor Who villains, including the Time Lord Omega.

== Early life ==
Thorne was born in London in 1935 and brought up in Hesketh Bank, Lancashire, by adoptive parents, Alan Thorne, a vicar, and his wife Betty (née Boulton). He went to school at Liverpool College and then joined the Royal Navy for his national service. On demobilisation Thorne trained at the Royal Academy of Dramatic Art (RADA), a drama school situated in the Bloomsbury area of London, and graduated in 1957.

== Career ==
He played several seasons with the Old Vic Company and the Royal Shakespeare Company in Stratford and London including a tour to Russia. He worked extensively in radio with over 2000 broadcasts for the BBC including as Uncle Mort in the Radio 4 comedy series Uncle Mort's North Country.

His television credits included Z-Cars, Crossroads, and Doctor Who. In Doctor Who, he played three major villains (Omega, Azal, and Eldrad), as well as an Ogron, before later playing the villainous Max in The Ghosts of N-Space, a Doctor Who BBC Radio story, in the mid-1990s. Also on radio, Thorne appeared as Aslan in The Magician's Nephew, as Treebeard in the Radio 4 adaptation of The Lord of the Rings, and also in their adaptation of Terry Pratchett's Guards! Guards! in which he portrayed Fred Colon (and also Death). He was also renowned for audio book narration. He also played the character of Lionheart in The Scarifyers following Nicholas Courtney's death.

Other television work included Death of an Expert Witness, David Copperfield, and Last of the Summer Wine. He voiced Aslan in the animated version of The Lion, the Witch and the Wardrobe. Thorne reprised the character on the BBC radio adaptation of the same name. He gave many poetry readings on radio, television, and tape and in venues from Westminster Abbey to various pubs.

He recorded over 300 unabridged audiobooks including children's stories which earned critical acclaim in both the UK and the US. Awards included a Talkies Award 1996 for Enigma by Robert Harris and several Golden Earphones Awards from Audiofile Magazine.

== Personal life ==
While training at RADA Thorne met fellow student Barbara Sykes, and they married in 1958.

On 26 May 2019, Thorne died, at the age of 84. At the time of his death he was married, and had two sons, Simon and Crispian.

== Filmography ==
Year	Title	Role	Notes
1971–1976	Doctor Who	Azal/Omega/Ogron/Kastrian Eldrad	In the stories: The Dæmons, The Three Doctors, Frontier in Space and The Hand of Fear
1972	Jackanory Playhouse	The Vicar	Episode: The Wily Wizard and the Wicked Witch
1979	The Lion, the Witch and the Wardrobe	Aslan (voice)	TV film
1984	Runaway	Tommy	
1985	Certain Fury	Policeman	
1986	Valhalla	Thor (voice)	English version
1986	David Copperfield	Daniel Peggotty	Miniseries
1994	Shakespeare: The Animated Tales	Stephano/Hastings/Cardinal (voice)	2 episodes
1996	Testament: The Bible in Animation	King of Ninevah/Governor (voice)	2 episodes
2006	Last of the Summer Wine	Mr. Sanderson	Episode: A Tale of Two Sweaters
