= The Chronicles of Narnia =

Series of children's novels by C. S. Lewis

- The Chronicles of Narnia boxed set
- The Lion, the Witch and the Wardrobe (1950); Prince Caspian (1951); The Voyage of the Dawn Treader (1952); The Silver Chair (1953); The Horse and His Boy (1954); The Magician's Nephew (1955); The Last Battle (1956)
- Author: C. S. Lewis
- Illustrator: Pauline Baynes
- Country: United Kingdom
- Genre: High fantasy; Children's literature
- Publisher: Geoffrey Bles (books 1–5); The Bodley Head (books 6–7); HarperCollins (current; worldwide)
- Published: 16 October 1950 – 4 September 1956
- Media type: Print (hardback and paperback); Audiobook; E-book
- Website: www.narnia.com

The Chronicles of Narnia is a series of seven portal fantasy novels by British author C. S. Lewis. Illustrated by Pauline Baynes and originally published between October 1950 and September 1956, the series is set in the fictional realm of Narnia, a fantasy world of magic, mythical beasts, and talking animals. It narrates the adventures of various children who play central roles in the unfolding history of the Narnian world. Except in The Horse and His Boy, the protagonists are all children from the real world who are magically transported to Narnia, where they are sometimes called upon by the lion Aslan (who appears in all seven books) to protect Narnia from evil. The books span the entire history of Narnia, from its creation in The Magician's Nephew to its eventual destruction in The Last Battle.

C.S. Lewis's life and literary influences deeply shaped The Chronicles of Narnia. His childhood experiences – moving to a large house in Belfast, losing his mother at an early age, and attending English boarding schools – paralleled events and settings in Narnia, such as Lucy discovering the magical world, and the Pevensies attending school. Lewis also drew extensively on mythology, medieval literature, and cosmology. Works like the Old Irish immrama inspired The Voyage of the Dawn Treader; Michael Ward's Planet Narnia suggests that each Narnia book corresponds to a medieval planet with symbolic traits. Lewis's reading of Plato, George MacDonald, Dante, and John Milton influenced themes, character archetypes, and moral lessons in the series, with elements of Christian theology interwoven through characters like Aslan, though Lewis preferred the term "supposition" over "allegory".

The books have had significant influence, shaping literature and popular culture. Writers such as Philip Pullman, Katherine Paterson, Lev Grossman, and J.K. Rowling drew inspiration from Narnia's worlds, characters, and narrative structures. Criticism of the series has focused on perceived inconsistencies, gender stereotyping, and racial representation, but defenders argue that the female characters are often portrayed heroically and that themes of morality, courage, and imagination remain central, contributing to the series' lasting appeal.

The Chronicles of Narnia is considered a classic of children's literature and is Lewis's best-selling work, having sold approximately 120 million copies in 47 languages. The series has been adapted for radio, television, the stage, film, and video games.

== Background and conception ==
Although Lewis originally conceived what would become The Chronicles of Narnia in 1939 (the picture of a Faun with parcels in a snowy wood has a history dating to 1914), he did not finish writing the first book The Lion, the Witch and the Wardrobe until 1949. The Magician's Nephew, the penultimate book to be published, but the last to be written, was completed in 1954. Lewis did not write the books in the order in which they were originally published, nor were they published in their current chronological order of presentation. The original illustrator, Pauline Baynes, created pen and ink drawings for the Narnia books that are still used in the editions published today.

Lewis was awarded the 1956 Carnegie Medal for The Last Battle, the final book in the saga. The series was first referred to as The Chronicles of Narnia by fellow children's author Roger Lancelyn Green in March 1951, after he had read and discussed with Lewis his recently completed fourth book The Silver Chair, originally entitled Night under Narnia.

Lewis described the origin of The Lion, the Witch and the Wardrobe in an essay entitled "It All Began with a Picture":

The Lion all began with a picture of a Faun carrying an umbrella and parcels in a snowy wood. This picture had been in my mind since I was about sixteen. Then one day, when I was about forty, I said to myself: "Let's try to make a story about it."

At the start of World War II, many children were evacuated to the English countryside in anticipation of attacks on London and other major urban areas by Nazi Germany. As a result, on 2 September 1939, three school girls named Margaret, Mary and Katherine came to live at The Kilns in Risinghurst, Lewis's home three miles east of Oxford city centre. Lewis later suggested that the experience gave him a new appreciation of children and in late September he began a children's story on an odd sheet of paper which has survived as part of another manuscript:

This book is about four children whose names were Ann, Martin, Rose and Peter. But it is most about Peter who was the youngest. They all had to go away from London suddenly because of Air Raids, and because Father, who was in the Army, had gone off to the War and Mother was doing some kind of war work. They were sent to stay with a kind of relation of Mother's who was a very old professor who lived all by himself in the country.

In "It All Began with a Picture", C. S. Lewis continues:

At first, I had very little idea how the story would go. But then suddenly Aslan came bounding into it. I think I had been having a good many dreams of lions about that time. Apart from that, I don't know where the Lion came from or why he came. But once he was there, he pulled the whole story together, and soon he pulled the six other Narnian stories in after him.

Although Lewis pleaded ignorance about the source of his inspiration for Aslan, Jared Lobdell, digging into Lewis's history to explore the making of the series, suggests Charles Williams's 1931 novel The Place of the Lion as a likely influence.

The manuscript for The Lion, the Witch and the Wardrobe was complete by the end of March 1949.

=== Name ===
The name Narnia is based on Narni, Italy, written in Latin as Narnia. Green wrote:

When Walter Hooper asked where he found the word 'Narnia', Lewis showed him Murray's Small Classical Atlas, ed. G.B. Grundy (1904), which he acquired when he was reading the classics with Mr [William T.] Kirkpatrick at Great Bookham [1914–1917]. On plate 8 of the Atlas is a map of ancient Italy. Lewis had underscored the name of a little town called Narnia, simply because he liked the sound of it. Narnia – or 'Narni' in Italian – is in Umbria, halfway between Rome and Assisi.

== Publication history ==
The Chronicles of Narnia's seven books have been in continuous publication since 1956, selling over 100 million copies in 47 languages and with editions in braille.

The first five books were originally published in the United Kingdom by Geoffrey Bles. The first edition of The Lion, the Witch and the Wardrobe was released in London on 16 October 1950. Although three more books, Prince Caspian, The Voyage of the Dawn Treader and The Horse and His Boy, were already complete, they were not released immediately at that time, but instead appeared (along with The Silver Chair) one at a time in each of the subsequent years (1951–1954). The last two books (The Magician's Nephew and The Last Battle) were published in the United Kingdom originally by The Bodley Head in 1955 and 1956.

In the United States, the publication rights were first owned by Macmillan Publishers, and later by HarperCollins. The two issued both hardcover and paperback editions of the series during their tenure as publishers, while at the same time Scholastic, Inc. produced paperback versions for sale primarily through direct mail order, book clubs, and book fairs. HarperCollins also published several one-volume collected editions containing the full text of the series. As noted below (see Reading order), the first American publisher, Macmillan, numbered the books in publication sequence, whereas HarperCollins, at the suggestion of Lewis's stepson, opted to use the series' internal chronological order when they won the rights to it in 1994. Scholastic switched the numbering of its paperback editions in 1994 to mirror that of HarperCollins.

== Books ==
The seven books that make up The Chronicles of Narnia are presented here in order of original publication date.

=== The Lion, the Witch and the Wardrobe (1950) ===
The Lion, the Witch and the Wardrobe, completed by the end of March 1949 and published by Geoffrey Bles in the United Kingdom on 16 October 1950, tells the story of four ordinary children: Peter, Susan, Edmund, and Lucy Pevensie, Londoners who were evacuated to the English countryside following the outbreak of World War II. They discover a wardrobe in Professor Digory Kirke's house that leads to the magical land of Narnia. The Pevensie children help Aslan, a talking lion, save Narnia from the evil White Witch, who has reigned for a century of perpetual winter with no Christmas. The children become kings and queens of this new-found land and establish the Golden Age of Narnia, leaving a legacy to be rediscovered in later books.

=== Prince Caspian: The Return to Narnia (1951) ===
Completed after Christmas 1949 and published on 15 October 1951, Prince Caspian: The Return to Narnia tells the story of the Pevensie children's second trip to Narnia, a year (on Earth) after their first. They are drawn back by the power of Susan's horn, blown by Prince Caspian to summon help in his hour of need. Narnia as they knew it is no more, as 1,300 years have passed, their castle is in ruins, and all Narnians have retreated so far within themselves that only Aslan's magic can wake them. Caspian has fled into the woods to escape his uncle, Miraz, who has usurped the throne. The children set out once again to save Narnia.

=== The Voyage of the Dawn Treader (1952) ===
Written between January and February 1950 and published on 15 September 1952, The Voyage of the Dawn Treader sees Edmund and Lucy Pevensie, along with their priggish cousin, Eustace Scrubb, return to Narnia, three Narnian years (and one Earth year) after their last departure. Once there, they join Caspian's voyage on the ship Dawn Treader to find the seven lords who were banished when Miraz took over the throne. This perilous journey brings them face to face with many wonders and dangers as they sail toward Aslan's country at the edge of the world.

=== The Silver Chair (1953) ===
Completed at the beginning of March 1951 and published 7 September 1953, The Silver Chair is the first Narnia book not involving the Pevensie children, focusing instead on Eustace. Several months after The Voyage of the Dawn Treader, Aslan calls Eustace back to Narnia along with his classmate Jill Pole. They are given four signs to aid them in the search for Prince Caspian's son Rilian, who disappeared ten years earlier on a quest to avenge his mother's death. Fifty years have passed in Narnia since the events from The Voyage of the Dawn Treader; Eustace is still a child, but Caspian, barely an adult in the previous book, is now an old man. Eustace and Jill, with the help of Puddleglum the Marsh-wiggle, face danger and betrayal on their quest to find Rilian.

=== The Horse and His Boy (1954) ===
Begun in March and completed at the end of July 1950, The Horse and His Boy was published on 6 September 1954. The story takes place during the reign of the Pevensies in Narnia, an era which begins and ends in the last chapter of The Lion, the Witch and the Wardrobe. The protagonists, a young boy named Shasta and a talking horse named Bree, both begin in bondage in the country of Calormen. By "chance", they meet and plan their return to Narnia and freedom. Along the way they meet Aravis and her talking horse Hwin, who are also fleeing to Narnia.

=== The Magician's Nephew (1955) ===
Completed in February 1954 and published by Bodley Head in London on 2 May 1955, The Magician's Nephew serves as a prequel and presents Narnia's origin story: how Aslan created the world and how evil first entered it. Digory Kirke and his friend Polly Plummer stumble into different worlds by experimenting with magic rings given to them by Digory's uncle. In the dying world of Charn they awaken Queen Jadis, and another world turns out to be the beginnings of the Narnian world (where Jadis later becomes the White Witch). The story is set in 1900, when Digory was a 12-year-old boy. He is a middle-aged professor by the time he hosts the Pevensie children in The Lion, the Witch and the Wardrobe 40 years later.

=== The Last Battle (1956) ===
Completed in March 1953 and published 4 September 1956, The Last Battle chronicles the end of the world of Narnia. Approximately two hundred Narnian years (and seven Earth years) after the events of The Silver Chair, Jill and Eustace return to save Narnia from the ape Shift, who tricks Puzzle the donkey into impersonating the lion Aslan, thereby precipitating a showdown between the Calormenes and King Tirian. This leads to the end of Narnia as it is known throughout the series, but allows Aslan to lead the characters to the "true" Narnia.

== Reading order ==
A 1970 Collier-Macmillan edition paperback boxed set (cover art by Roger Hane), where the books are presented in order of original publication

Fans of the series often have strong opinions about the order in which the books should be read. The issue revolves around the placement of The Magician's Nephew and The Horse and His Boy in the series. Both are set significantly earlier in the story of Narnia than their publication order and fall somewhat outside the main story arc connecting the others. The reading order of the other five books is not disputed.

| Book | Writing completed | Published | Internal chronology | |
| Book | Writing completed | Published | Earth | Narnia |
|---|---|---|---|---|
| The Lion, the Witch and the Wardrobe | March 1949 | 1950 | 1940 | 1000–1015 |
| Prince Caspian | Christmas 1949 | 1951 | 1941 | 2303 |
| The Voyage of the Dawn Treader | February 1950 | 1952 | Summer 1942 | 2306–2307 |
| The Silver Chair | March 1951 | 1953 | Autumn 1942 | 2356 |
| The Horse and His Boy | July 1950 | 1954 | [1940] | 1014 |
| The Magician's Nephew | February 1954 | 1955 | 1900 | 1 |
| The Last Battle | March 1953 | 1956 | 1949 | 2555 |

When first published, the books were not numbered. The first American publisher, Macmillan, enumerated them according to their original publication order, while some early British editions specified the internal chronological order. When HarperCollins took over the series rights in 1994, they adopted the internal chronological order. To make the case for the internal chronological order, Lewis's stepson, Douglas Gresham, quoted Lewis's 1957 reply to a letter from an American fan who was having an argument with his mother about the order:

I think I agree with your [chronological] order for reading the books more than with your mother's. The series was not planned beforehand as she thinks. When I wrote The Lion I did not know I was going to write any more. Then I wrote P. Caspian as a sequel and still didn't think there would be any more, and when I had done The Voyage I felt quite sure it would be the last, but I found I was wrong. So perhaps it does not matter very much in which order anyone read them. I'm not even sure that all the others were written in the same order in which they were published.

In the 2005 HarperCollins adult editions of the books, the publisher cites this letter to assert Lewis's preference for the numbering they adopted by including this notice on the copyright page:

Although The Magician's Nephew was written several years after C. S. Lewis first began The Chronicles of Narnia, he wanted it to be read as the first book in the series. HarperCollins is happy to present these books in the order in which Professor Lewis preferred.

Paul Ford cites several scholars who have weighed in against this view and continues, saying, "Most scholars disagree with this decision and find it the least faithful to Lewis's deepest intentions." Scholars and readers who appreciate the original order believe that Lewis was simply being gracious to his youthful correspondent and that he could have changed the books' order in his lifetime had he so desired. They maintain that much of the magic of Narnia comes from the way the world is gradually presented in The Lion, the Witch and the Wardrobe—that the mysterious wardrobe, as a narrative device, is a much better introduction to Narnia than The Magician's Nephew, where the word "Narnia" appears in the first paragraph as something already familiar to the reader. Moreover, they say, it is clear from the texts themselves that The Lion, the Witch and the Wardrobe was intended to be read first. When Aslan is first mentioned in The Lion, the Witch and the Wardrobe, for example, the narrator says that "None of the children knew who Aslan was, any more than you do"—which is nonsensical if one has already read The Magician's Nephew. Other similar textual examples are also cited.

Doris Meyer, author of C. S. Lewis in Context and Bareface: A Guide to C.S. Lewis's Last Novel, writes that rearranging the stories chronologically "lessens the impact of the individual stories" and "obscures the literary structures as a whole". Peter Schakel devotes an entire chapter to this topic in his book Imagination and the Arts in C. S. Lewis: Journeying to Narnia and Other Worlds, and in Reading with the Heart: The Way into Narnia he writes:

The only reason to read The Magician's Nephew first [...] is for the chronological order of events, and that, as every story teller knows, is quite unimportant as a reason. Often the early events in a sequence have a greater impact or effect as a flashback, told after later events which provide background and establish perspective. So it is [...] with the Chronicles. The artistry, the archetypes, and the pattern of Christian thought all make it preferable to read the books in the order of their publication.

== Main characters ==
=== Aslan ===
Aslan, the Great Lion, is the titular lion of The Lion, the Witch and the Wardrobe, and his role in Narnia is developed throughout the remaining books. He is also the only character to appear in all seven books. Aslan is a talking lion, the King of Beasts, son of the Emperor-Over-the-Sea. He is a wise, compassionate, magical authority (both temporal and spiritual) who serves as mysterious and benevolent guide to the human children who visit, as well as being the guardian and saviour of Narnia. C. S. Lewis described Aslan as an alternative version of Jesus as the form in which he may have appeared in an alternative reality. In his book Miracles, C.S. Lewis argues that the possible existence of other worlds with other sentient life-forms should not deter or detract from being Christian:

[The universe] may be full of lives that have been redeemed in modes suitable to their condition, of which we can form no conception. It may be full of lives that have been redeemed in the very same mode as our own. It may be full of things quite other than life in which God is interested though we are not.

=== Pevensie family ===
The four Pevensie siblings are the main human protagonists of The Chronicles of Narnia. Varying combinations of some or all of them appear in five of the seven novels. They are introduced in The Lion, the Witch and the Wardrobe (although their surname is not revealed until The Voyage of the Dawn Treader), and eventually become Kings and Queens of Narnia reigning as a tetrarchy. Although introduced in the series as children, the siblings grow up into adults while reigning in Narnia. They go back to being children once they get back to their own world, but feature as adults in The Horse and His Boy during their Narnian reign.

All four appear in The Lion, the Witch, and the Wardrobe and Prince Caspian; in the latter, however, Aslan tells Peter and Susan that they will not return, as they are getting too old. Susan, Lucy, and Edmund appear in The Horse and His Boy – Peter is said to be away fighting giants on the other side of Narnia. Lucy and Edmund appear in The Voyage of the Dawn Treader, where Aslan tells them, too, that they are getting too old. Peter, Edmund, and Lucy appear as Kings and Queens in Aslan's Country in The Last Battle; Susan does not. Asked by a child in 1958 if he would please write another book entitled "Susan of Narnia" so that the entire Pevensie family would be reunited, C. S. Lewis replied: "I am so glad you like the Narnian books and it was nice of you to write and tell me. There's no use just asking me to write more. When stories come into my mind I have to write them, and when they don't I can't!"

==== Lucy Pevensie ====
Lucy is the youngest of the four Pevensie siblings. Of all the Pevensie children, Lucy is the closest to Aslan, and of all the human characters who visit Narnia, Lucy is perhaps the one who believes in Narnia the most. In The Lion, the Witch, and the Wardrobe, she initiates the story by entering Narnia through the wardrobe, and (with Susan) witnesses Aslan's execution and resurrection. She is named Queen Lucy the Valiant. In Prince Caspian, she is the first to see Aslan when he comes to guide them. In The Voyage of the Dawn Treader, it is Lucy who breaks the spell of invisibility on the Dufflepuds. As an adult in The Horse and His Boy, she helps fight the Calormenes at Anvard. Although a minor character in The Last Battle, much of the closing chapter is seen from her point of view.

==== Edmund Pevensie ====
Edmund is the second child to enter Narnia in The Lion, the Witch, and the Wardrobe, where he falls under the White Witch's spell from eating the Turkish delight she gives him. Instantiating the book's Christian theme of betrayal, repentance, and subsequent redemption via blood sacrifice, he betrays his siblings to the White Witch, but quickly realizes her true nature and her evil intentions, and is redeemed by the sacrifice of Aslan's life. He is named King Edmund the Just. In Prince Caspian and The Voyage of the Dawn Treader, he supports Lucy; in The Horse and His Boy, he leads the Narnian delegation to Calormen and, later, the Narnian army breaking the siege at Anvard.

==== Susan Pevensie ====
In The Lion, the Witch, and the Wardrobe, Susan accompanies Lucy to see Aslan die and rise again. She is named Queen Susan the Gentle. In Prince Caspian, however, she is the last of the four to believe and follow Lucy when the latter is called by Aslan to guide them. As an adult queen in The Horse and His Boy, she is courted by Prince Rabadash of Calormen, but refuses his marriage proposal, and his angry response leads the story to its climax. In The Last Battle, she has stopped believing in Narnia and remembers it only as a childhood game, though Lewis mentioned in a letter to a fan that he thought she may eventually believe again: "The books don't tell us what happened to Susan ... But there is plenty of time for her to mend, and perhaps she will get to Aslan's country in the end – in her own way."

==== Peter Pevensie ====
Peter is the eldest of the Pevensies. In The Lion, the Witch, and the Wardrobe, he kills Maugrim, a talking wolf, to save Susan, and leads the Narnian army against the White Witch. Aslan names him High King, and he is known as Peter the Magnificent. In Prince Caspian, he duels the usurper King Miraz to restore Caspian's throne. In The Last Battle, it is Peter whom Aslan entrusts with the duty of closing the door on Narnia for the final time.

=== Eustace Scrubb ===
Eustace Clarence Scrubb is a cousin of the Pevensies, and a classmate of Jill Pole at their school Experiment House. He is portrayed at first as a brat and a bully, but comes to improve his nasty behaviour when his greed turns him into a dragon for a while. His distress at having to live as a dragon causes him to reflect upon how horrible he has been, and his subsequent improved character is rewarded when Aslan changes him back into a boy. In the later books, Eustace comes across as a much nicer person, although he is still rather grumpy and argumentative. Nonetheless, he becomes a hero along with Jill Pole when the pair succeed in freeing the lost Prince Rilian from the clutches of an evil witch. He appears in The Voyage of the Dawn Treader, The Silver Chair, and The Last Battle.

=== Jill Pole ===
Jill Pole is a schoolmate of Eustace Scrubb. She appears in The Silver Chair, where she is the viewpoint character for most of the action, and returns in The Last Battle. In The Silver Chair, Eustace introduces her to the Narnian world, where Aslan gives her the task of memorising a series of signs that will help her and Eustace on their quest to find Caspian's lost son. In The Last Battle, she and Eustace accompany King Tirian in his ill-fated defence of Narnia against the Calormenes.

=== Professor Digory Kirke ===
Digory Kirke is the nephew referred to in the title of The Magician's Nephew. He first appears as a minor character in The Lion, the Witch and the Wardrobe, known only as "The Professor", who hosts the Pevensie children when they are evacuated from London and defends Lucy's story of having found a country in the back of the wardrobe. In The Magician's Nephew, the young Digory, thanks to his uncle's magical experimentation, inadvertently brings Jadis from her dying homeworld of Charn to the newly created world of Narnia; to rectify his mistake, Aslan sends him to fetch a magical apple which will protect Narnia and heal his dying mother. He returns in The Last Battle.

=== Polly Plummer ===
Polly Plummer appears in The Magician's Nephew and The Last Battle. She is the next-door neighbour of the young Digory Kirke. She is tricked by a wicked magician (who is Digory's uncle) into touching a magic ring which transports her to the Wood between the Worlds and leaves her there stranded. The wicked uncle persuades Digory to follow her with a second magic ring that has the power to bring her back. This sets up the pair's adventures into other worlds, and they witness the creation of Narnia as described in The Magician's Nephew. She appears at the end of The Last Battle.

=== Tumnus ===
Tumnus the Faun, called "Mr Tumnus" by Lucy, is featured prominently in The Lion, the Witch and the Wardrobe and also appears in The Horse and His Boy and The Last Battle. He is the first creature Lucy meets in Narnia, as well as the first Narnian to be introduced in the series; he invites her to his home with the intention of betraying her to Jadis, but quickly repents and befriends her. In The Horse and His Boy, he devises the Narnian delegation's plan of escape from Calormen. He returns for a brief dialogue at the end of The Last Battle. Lewis's initial inspiration for the entire series was a mental image of a faun in a snowy wood; Tumnus is that faun.

=== Caspian ===
Caspian is first introduced in the book titled after him, as the young nephew and heir of King Miraz. Fleeing potential assassination by his uncle, he becomes leader of the Old Narnian rebellion against the Telmarine occupation. With the help of the Pevensies, he defeats Miraz's army and becomes King Caspian X of Narnia. In The Voyage of the Dawn Treader, he leads an expedition out into the eastern ocean to find Seven Lords, whom Miraz had exiled, and ultimately to reach Aslan's Country. In The Silver Chair, he makes two brief appearances as an old, dying man, but at the end is resurrected in Aslan's Country.

=== Trumpkin ===
Trumpkin the Dwarf is the narrator of several chapters of Prince Caspian; he is one of Caspian's rescuers and a leading figure in the "Old Narnian" rebellion, and accompanies the Pevensie children from the ruins of Cair Paravel to the Old Narnian camp. In The Voyage of the Dawn Treader, we learn that Caspian has made him his Regent in Narnia while he is away at sea, and he appears briefly in this role (now elderly and very deaf) in The Silver Chair.

=== Reepicheep ===
Reepicheep the Mouse is the leader of the Talking Mice of Narnia in Prince Caspian. Utterly fearless, infallibly courteous, and obsessed with honour, he is badly wounded in the final battle but healed by Lucy and Aslan. In The Voyage of the Dawn Treader, his role is greatly expanded; he becomes a visionary as well as a warrior, and ultimately his willing self-exile to Aslan's Country breaks the enchantment on the last three of the Lost Lords, thus achieving the final goal of the quest. Lewis identified Reepicheep as "specially" exemplifying the latter book's theme of "the spiritual life". Reepicheep makes one final cameo appearance at the end of The Last Battle, in Aslan's Country.

=== Puddleglum ===
Puddleglum the Marsh-wiggle guides Eustace and Jill on their quest in The Silver Chair. Though always comically pessimistic, he provides the voice of reason and as such intervenes critically in the climactic enchantment scene.

=== Shasta / Cor ===
Shasta, later known as Cor of Archenland, is the principal character in The Horse and His Boy. Born the eldest son and heir of King Lune of Archenland, and elder twin of Prince Corin, Cor was kidnapped as an infant and raised as a fisherman's son in Calormen. With the help of the talking horse Bree, Shasta escapes from being sold into slavery and makes his way northward to Narnia. On the journey his companion Aravis learns of an imminent Calormene surprise attack on Archenland; Shasta warns the Archenlanders in time and discovers his true identity and original name. At the end of the story he marries Aravis and becomes King of Archenland.

=== Aravis ===
Aravis, daughter of Kidrash Tarkaan, is a character in The Horse and His Boy. Escaping a forced betrothal to the loathsome Ahoshta, she joins Shasta on his journey and inadvertently overhears a plot by Rabadash, crown prince of Calormen, to invade Archenland. She later marries Shasta, now known as Prince Cor, and becomes queen of Archenland at his side.

=== Bree ===
Bree (Breehy-hinny-brinny-hoohy-hah) is Shasta's mount and mentor in The Horse and His Boy. A Talking Horse of Narnia, he wandered into Calormen as a foal and was captured. He first appears as a Calormene nobleman's war-horse; when the nobleman buys Shasta as a slave, Bree organises and carries out their joint escape. Though friendly, he is also vain and a braggart until his encounter with Aslan late in the story.

=== Tirian ===
The last King of Narnia is the viewpoint character for much of The Last Battle. Having rashly killed a Calormene for mistreating a Narnian Talking Horse, he is imprisoned by the villainous ape Shift but released by Eustace and Jill. Together they fight faithfully to the last and are welcomed into Aslan's Kingdom.

=== Antagonists ===
==== Jadis, the White Witch ====
Jadis, commonly known during her rule of Narnia as the White Witch, is the main villain of The Lion, The Witch and the Wardrobe and The Magician's Nephew – the only antagonist to appear in more than one Narnia book. In The Lion, the Witch, and the Wardrobe, she is the witch responsible for the freezing of Narnia resulting in the Hundred Year Winter; she turns her enemies into statues and kills Aslan on the Stone Table, but is killed by him in battle after his resurrection. In The Magician's Nephew, she is wakened from a magical sleep by Digory in the dead world of Charn and inadvertently brought to Victorian London before being transported to Narnia, where she steals an apple to grant her the gift of immortality.

==== Miraz ====
King Miraz is the lead villain of Prince Caspian. Prior to the book's opening he has killed King Caspian IX, father of the titular Prince Caspian, and usurped his throne as king of the Telmarine colonizers in Narnia. He raises Caspian as his heir, but seeks to kill him after his own son is born. As the story progresses he leads the Telmarine war against the Old Narnian rebellion; he is defeated in single combat by Peter and then murdered by one of his own lords.

==== Lady of the Green Kirtle ====
The Lady of the Green Kirtle is the lead villain of The Silver Chair, and is also referred to in that book as "the Queen of Underland" or simply as "the Witch". She rules an underground kingdom through magical mind-control. Prior to the events of The Silver Chair, she has murdered Caspian's Queen and then seduced and abducted his son Prince Rilian. She encounters the protagonists on their quest and sends them astray. Confronted by them later, she attempts to enslave them magically; when that fails, she attacks them in the form of a serpent and is killed.

==== Rabadash ====
Prince Rabadash, heir to the throne of Calormen, is the primary antagonist of The Horse and His Boy. Hot-headed, arrogant, and entitled, he brings Queen Susan of Narnia – along with a small retinue of Narnians, including King Edmund – to Calormen in the hope that Susan will marry him. When the Narnians realize that Rabadash may force Susan to accept his marriage proposal, they spirit Susan out of Calormen by ship. Incensed, Rabadash launches a surprise attack on Archenland with the ultimate intention of raiding Narnia and taking Susan captive. His plan is foiled when Shasta and Aravis warn the Archenlanders of his impending strike. After being captured by Edmund, Rabadash blasphemes against Aslan. Aslan then temporarily transforms him into a donkey as punishment.

==== Shift the Ape ====
Shift is the most prominent villain of The Last Battle. He is an elderly Talking Ape – Lewis does not specify what kind of ape, but Pauline Baynes' illustrations depict him as a chimpanzee. He persuades the naïve donkey Puzzle to pretend to be Aslan (wearing a lion-skin) in order to seize control of Narnia, and proceeds to cut down the forests, enslave the other Talking Beasts, and invite the Calormenes to invade. He loses control of the situation due to over-indulging in alcohol, and is eventually swallowed up by the evil Calormene god Tash.

=== Title characters ===
- The Magician's Nephew – Digory Kirke (Andrew Ketterley is the magician)
- The Lion, the Witch and the Wardrobe – Aslan, Jadis
- The Horse and His Boy – Bree, Shasta
- Prince Caspian – Prince Caspian

=== Appearances of main characters ===
| Character | Book | | | | | | | |
| Character | The Lion, the Witch and the Wardrobe (1950) | Prince Caspian: The Return to Narnia (1951) | The Voyage of the Dawn Treader (1952) | The Silver Chair (1953) | The Horse and His Boy (1954) | The Magician's Nephew (1955) | The Last Battle (1956) | Total Appearances |
|---|---|---|---|---|---|---|---|---|
| Aslan | Major | Major | Major | Major | Major | Major | Major | 7 |
| Peter Pevensie | Major | Major | | | | | Minor | 3 |
| Susan Pevensie | Major | Major | | | Minor | | | 3 |
| Edmund Pevensie | Major | Major | Major | | Minor | | Minor | 5 |
| Lucy Pevensie | Major | Major | Major | | Minor | | Minor | 5 |
| Eustace Scrubb | | | Major | Major | | | Major | 3 |
| Jill Pole | | | | Major | | | Major | 2 |
| (Professor) Digory Kirke | Minor | | | | | Major | Minor | 3 |
| Polly Plummer | | | | | | Major | Minor | 2 |
| (Mr) Tumnus | Major | | | | Minor | | Minor | 3 |
| Prince/King Caspian | | Major | Major | Minor | | | Cameo | 4 |
| Trumpkin the Dwarf | | Major | | Minor | | | Cameo | 3 |
| Reepicheep the Mouse | | Minor | Major | | | | Minor | 3 |
| Puddleglum | | | | Major | | | Cameo | 2 |
| Shasta (Prince Cor) | | | | | Major | | Cameo | 2 |
| Aravis Tarkheena | | | | | Major | | Cameo | 2 |
| Bree | | | | | Major | | Cameo | 2 |
| King Tirian | | | | | | | Major | 1 |
| Jadis (The White Witch) | Major | | | | | Major | | 2 |
| King Miraz | | Major | | | | | | 1 |
| The Lady of the Green Kirtle | | | | Major | | | | 1 |
| Prince Rabadash | | | | | Major | | | 1 |
| Shift the Ape | | | | | | | Major | 1 |

== Narnian geography ==
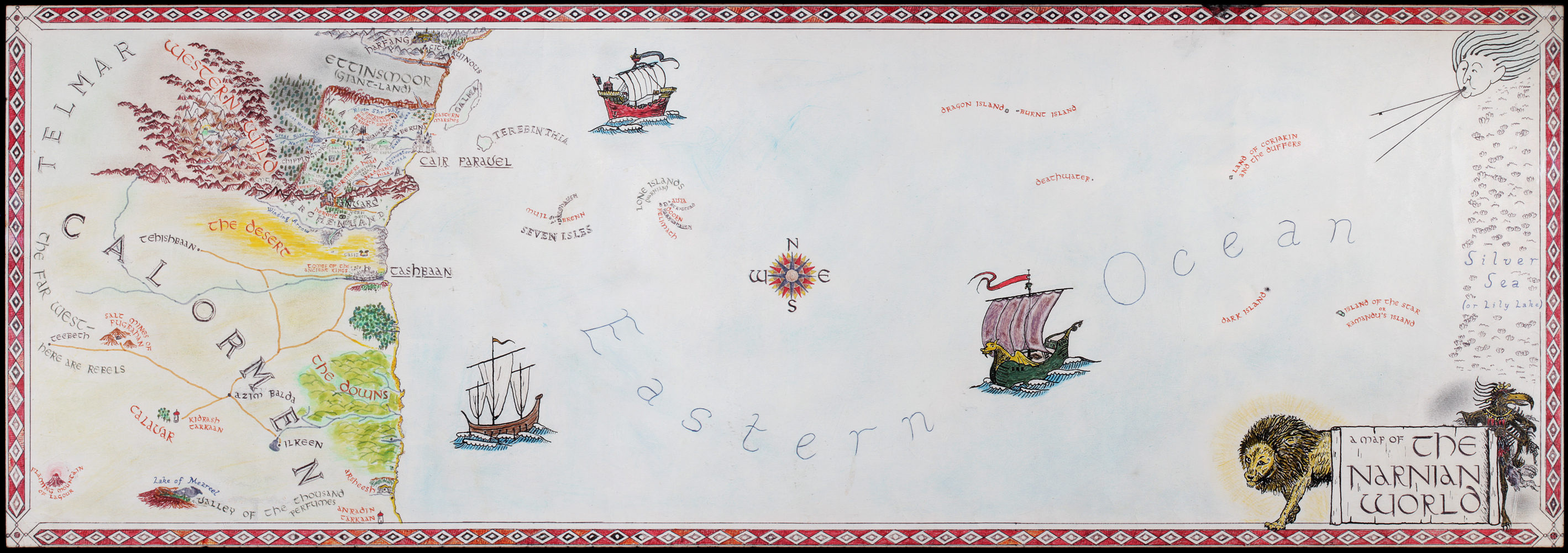
A map by David Bedell of the fictional universe of the Narnian world

The Chronicles of Narnia describes the world in which Narnia exists as one major landmass encircled by an ocean. Narnia's capital sits on the eastern edge of the landmass on the shores of the Great Eastern Ocean. This ocean contains the islands explored in The Voyage of the Dawn Treader. On the main landmass Lewis places the countries of Narnia, Archenland, Calormen, and Telmar, along with a variety of other areas that are not described as countries. The author also provides glimpses of more fantastic locations that exist in and around the main world of Narnia, including an edge and an underworld.

== Other known locations ==
Besides Earth and Narnia, there are other known settings in this franchise:

== Influences ==
=== Lewis's life ===
Lewis's early life has parallels with The Chronicles of Narnia. At the age of seven, he moved with his family to a large house on the edge of Belfast. Its long hallways and empty rooms inspired Lewis and his brother to invent make-believe worlds whilst exploring their home, an activity reflected in Lucy's discovery of Narnia in The Lion, the Witch and the Wardrobe. Like Caspian and Rilian, Lewis lost his mother at an early age, spending much of his youth in English boarding schools similar to those attended by the Pevensie children, Eustace Scrubb, and Jill Pole. During World War II many children were evacuated from London and other urban areas because of German air raids. Some of these children, including one named Lucy (Lewis's goddaughter) stayed with him at his home The Kilns near Oxford, just as the Pevensies stayed with The Professor in The Lion, the Witch and the Wardrobe.

=== Influences from mythology and cosmology ===
Drew Trotter, president of the Center for Christian Study, noted that the producers of the film The Chronicles of Narnia: The Lion, the Witch, and the Wardrobe felt that the books' plots adhere to the archetypal "monomyth" pattern as detailed in Joseph Campbell's The Hero with a Thousand Faces.

Lewis was widely read in medieval Celtic literature, an influence reflected throughout the books, and most strongly in The Voyage of the Dawn Treader. The entire book imitates one of the immrama, a type of traditional Old Irish tale that combines elements of Christianity and Irish mythology to tell the story of a hero's sea journey to the Otherworld.

==== Planet Narnia ====
Michael Ward's 2008 book Planet Narnia proposes that each of the seven books related to one of the seven moving heavenly bodies or "planets" known in the Middle Ages according to the Ptolemaic geocentric model of cosmology (a theme to which Lewis returned habitually throughout his work). At that time, each of these heavenly bodies was believed to have certain attributes, and Ward contends that these attributes were deliberately but subtly used by Lewis to furnish elements of the stories of each book:

In The Lion [the child protagonists] become monarchs under sovereign Jove; in Prince Caspian they harden under strong Mars; in The "Dawn Treader" they drink light under searching Sol; in The Silver Chair they learn obedience under subordinate Luna; in The Horse and His Boy they come to love poetry under eloquent Mercury; in The Magician's Nephew they gain life-giving fruit under fertile Venus; and in The Last Battle they suffer and die under chilling Saturn.

Lewis's interest in the literary symbolism of medieval and Renaissance astrology is more overtly referenced in other works such as his study of medieval cosmology The Discarded Image, and in his early poetry as well as in Space Trilogy. Narnia scholar Paul F. Ford finds Ward's assertion that Lewis intended The Chronicles to be an embodiment of medieval astrology implausible, though Ford addresses an earlier (2003) version of Ward's thesis (also called Planet Narnia, published in the Times Literary Supplement). Ford argues that Lewis did not start with a coherent plan for the books, but Ward's book answers this by arguing that the astrological associations grew in the writing:

Jupiter was... [Lewis's] favourite planet, part of the "habitual furniture" of his mind... The Lion was thus the first example of that "idea that he wanted to try out". Prince Caspian and The "Dawn Treader" naturally followed because Mars and Sol were both already connected in his mind with the merits of the Alexander technique.... at some point after commencing The Horse and His Boy he resolved to treat all seven planets, for seven such treatments of his idea would mean that he had "worked it out to the full".

A quantitative analysis on the imagery in the different books of The Chronicles gives mixed support to Ward's thesis: The Voyage of the Dawn Treader, The Silver Chair, The Horse and His Boy, and The Magician's Nephew do indeed employ concepts associated with, respectively, Sol, Luna, Mercury, and Venus, far more often than chance would predict, but The Lion, the Witch, and the Wardrobe, Prince Caspian, and The Last Battle fall short of statistical correlation with their proposed planets.

=== Influences from literature ===
George MacDonald's Phantastes (1858) influenced the structure and setting of "The Chronicles". It was a work that was "a great balm to the soul".

Plato was an undeniable influence on Lewis's writing of The Chronicles. Most clearly, Digory explicitly invokes Plato's name at the end of The Last Battle, to explain how the old version of Narnia is but a shadow of the newly revealed "true" Narnia. Plato's influence is also apparent in The Silver Chair when the Queen of the Underland attempts to convince the protagonists that the surface world is not real. She echoes the logic of Plato's Cave by comparing the sun to a nearby lamp, arguing that reality is only that which is perceived in the immediate physical vicinity.

The White Witch in The Lion, the Witch, and the Wardrobe shares many features, both of appearance and character, with the villainous Duessa of Edmund Spenser's Faerie Queene, a work Lewis studied in detail. Like Duessa, she falsely styles herself Queen; she leads astray the erring Edmund with false temptations; she turns people into stone as Duessa turns them into trees. Both villains wear opulent robes and deck their conveyances out with bells. In The Magician's Nephew Jadis takes on echoes of Satan from John Milton's Paradise Lost: she climbs over the wall of the paradisal garden in contempt of the command to enter only by the gate, and proceeds to tempt Digory as Satan tempted Eve, with lies and half-truths. Similarly, the Lady of the Green Kirtle in The Silver Chair recalls both the snake-woman Errour in The Faerie Queene and Satan's transformation into a snake in Paradise Lost.

Lewis read Edith Nesbit's children's books as a child and was greatly fond of them. He described The Lion, the Witch, and the Wardrobe around the time of its completion as "a children's book in the tradition of E. Nesbit". The Magician's Nephew in particular bears strong resemblances to Nesbit's The Story of the Amulet (1906). This novel focuses on four children living in London who discover a magic amulet. Their father is away and their mother is ill, as is the case with Digory. They manage to transport the queen of ancient Babylon to London and she is the cause of a riot; likewise, Polly and Digory transport Queen Jadis to London, sparking a very similar incident.

Marsha Daigle-Williamson argues that Dante's Divine Comedy had a significant impact on Lewis's writings. In the Narnia series, she identifies this influence as most apparent in The Voyage of the Dawn Treader and The Silver Chair. Daigle-Williamson identifies the plot of The Voyage of the Dawn Treader as a Dantean journey with a parallel structure and similar themes. She likewise draws numerous connections between The Silver Chair and the events of Dante's Inferno.

Colin Duriez, writing on the shared elements found in both Lewis's and J. R. R. Tolkien's works, highlights the thematic similarities between Tolkien's poem Imram and Lewis's The Voyage of the Dawn Treader.

== Influences on other works ==
The Chronicles of Narnia is considered a classic of children's literature.

=== Influences on literature ===
The Chronicles of Narnia has been a significant influence on both adult and children's fantasy literature in the post-World War II era. In 1976, the scholar Susan Cornell Poskanzer praised Lewis for his "strangely powerful fantasies". Poskanzer argued that children could relate to Narnia books because the heroes and heroines were realistic characters, each with their own distinctive voice and personality. Furthermore, the protagonists become powerful kings and queens who decide the fate of kingdoms, while the adults in the Narnia books tended to be buffoons, which by inverting the normal order of things was pleasing to many youngsters. However, Poskanzer criticized Lewis for what she regarded as scenes of gratuitous violence, which she felt were upsetting to children. Poskanzer also noted Lewis presented his Christian message subtly enough as to avoid boring children with overt sermonizing.

Examples include:

Philip Pullman's fantasy series, His Dark Materials, is seen as a response to The Chronicles. Pullman is a self-described atheist who wholly rejects the spiritual themes that permeate The Chronicles, yet his series nonetheless addresses many of the same issues and introduces some similar character types, including talking animals. In another parallel, the first books in each series – Pullman's Northern Lights and The Lion, the Witch, and the Wardrobe – both open with a young girl hiding in a wardrobe.

Bill Willingham's comic book series Fables makes reference at least twice to a king called "The Great Lion", a thinly veiled reference to Aslan. The series avoids explicitly referring to any characters or works that are not in the public domain.

The novel Bridge to Terabithia by Katherine Paterson has Leslie, one of the main characters, reveal to Jesse her love of Lewis's books, subsequently lending him The Chronicles of Narnia so that he can learn how to behave like a king. Her book also features the island name "Terabithia", which sounds similar to Terebinthia, a Narnian island that appears in Prince Caspian and The Voyage of the Dawn Treader. Katherine Paterson herself acknowledges that Terabithia is likely to be derived from Terebinthia:

I thought I had made it up. Then, rereading The Voyage of the Dawn Treader by C. S. Lewis, I realized that I had probably gotten it from the island of Terebinthia in that book. However, Lewis probably got that name from the terebinth tree in the Bible, so both of us pinched from somewhere else, probably unconsciously."

Science-fiction author Greg Egan's short story "Oracle" depicts a parallel universe in which an author nicknamed Jack (Lewis's nickname) has written novels about the fictional "Kingdom of Nesica", and whose wife is dying of cancer, paralleling the death of Lewis's wife Joy Davidman. Several Narnian allegories are also used to explore issues of religion and faith versus science and knowledge.

Lev Grossman's New York Times best-seller The Magicians is a contemporary dark fantasy about an unusually gifted young man obsessed with Fillory, the magical land of his favourite childhood books. Fillory is a thinly veiled substitute for Narnia, and clearly the author expects it to be experienced as such. Not only is the land home to many similar talking animals and mythical creatures, it is also accessed through a grandfather clock in the home of an uncle to whom five English children are sent during World War II. Moreover, the land is ruled by two Aslan-like rams named Ember and Umber, and terrorised by The Watcherwoman. She, like the White Witch, freezes the land in time. The book's plot revolves heavily around a place very like the "wood between the worlds" from The Magician's Nephew, an interworld waystation in which pools of water lead to other lands. This reference to The Magician's Nephew is echoed in the title of the book.

J. K. Rowling, author of the Harry Potter series, has said that she was a fan of the works of Lewis as a child, and cites the influence of The Chronicles on her work: "I found myself thinking about the wardrobe route to Narnia when Harry is told he has to hurl himself at a barrier in King's Cross Station – it dissolves and he's on platform Nine and Three-Quarters, and there's the train for Hogwarts." Nevertheless, she is at pains to stress the differences between Narnia and her world: "Narnia is literally a different world", she says, "whereas in the Harry books you go into a world within a world that you can see if you happen to belong. A lot of the humour comes from collisions between the magic and the everyday worlds. Generally there isn't much humour in the Narnia books, although I adored them when I was a child. I got so caught up I didn't think C.S. Lewis was especially preachy. Reading them now I find that his subliminal message isn't very subliminal." New York Times writer Charles McGrath notes the similarity between Dudley Dursley, the obnoxious son of Harry's neglectful guardians, and Eustace Scrubb, the spoiled brat who torments the main characters until he is redeemed by Aslan.

The comic book series Pakkins' Land by Gary and Rhoda Shipman in which a young child finds himself in a magical world filled with talking animals, including a lion character named King Aryah, has been compared favorably to the Narnia series. The Shipmans have cited the influence of C.S. Lewis and the Narnia series in response to reader letters.

=== Influences on popular culture ===
As with any popular long-lived work, contemporary culture abounds with references to the lion Aslan, travelling via wardrobe and direct mentions of The Chronicles. Examples include:

Charlotte Staples Lewis, a character first seen early in the fourth season of the TV series Lost, is named in reference to C. S. Lewis. Lost producer Damon Lindelof said that this was a clue to the direction the show would take during the season. The book Ultimate Lost and Philosophy, edited by William Irwin and Sharon Kaye, contains a comprehensive essay on Lost plot motifs based on The Chronicles.

The second SNL Digital Short by Andy Samberg and Chris Parnell features a humorous nerdcore hip hop song titled "Chronicles of Narnia (Lazy Sunday)", which focuses on the performers' plan to see The Chronicles of Narnia: The Lion, the Witch and the Wardrobe at a cinema. It was described by Slate magazine as one of the most culturally significant Saturday Night Live skits in many years, and an important commentary on the state of rap. Swedish Christian power metal band Narnia, whose songs are mainly about the Chronicles of Narnia or the Bible, feature Aslan on all their album covers. The song "Further Up, Further In" from the album Room to Roam by Scottish-Irish folk-rock band The Waterboys is heavily influenced by The Chronicles of Narnia. The title is taken from a passage in The Last Battle, and one verse of the song describes sailing to the end of the world to meet a king, similar to the ending of Voyage of the Dawn Treader. C. S. Lewis is explicitly acknowledged as an influence in the liner notes of the 1990 compact disc.

During interviews, the primary creator of the Japanese anime and gaming series Digimon has said that he was inspired and influenced by The Chronicles of Narnia.

Its influence extends to fan fiction: under the pen name Edonohana, Rachel Manija Brown wrote "No Reservations: Narnia", which imagined Anthony Bourdain exploring Narnia and its cuisine in the style of his No Reservations TV show and book. Bourdain himself praised the fic's writing and "frankly a bit frightening" attention to detail.

The IDF's plan to kill the top Iranian military commanders and nuclear scientists at the start of the 2025 Twelve-Day War was considered so fantastical that it was named Operation Narnia.

== Christian themes ==
Lewis had authored a number of works on Christian apologetics and other literature with Christian-based themes before writing the Narnia books. The character Aslan is widely accepted by literary academia as being based on Jesus Christ. Lewis did not initially plan to incorporate Christian theological concepts into his Narnia stories. Lewis maintained that the Narnia books were not allegorical, preferring to term their Christian aspects a "supposition".

The Chronicles have, consequently, a large Christian following, and are widely used to promote Christian ideas. However, some Christians object that The Chronicles promote "soft-sell paganism and occultism" due to recurring pagan imagery and themes.

== Criticism ==
=== Consistency ===
Gertrude Ward noted that Lewis clearly meant to create a world wholly without humans in The Lion, the Witch and the Wardrobe. As indicated by Tumnus' books, humans were the creatures of myth for creatures such as fauns, rather than the other way around. However, later volumes saw Lewis writing plots which required having more humans, with Ward stating "In Prince Caspian he still kept the original structure and explained that more humans had arrived from our world at a later time, overrunning Narnia." Later, Lewis rewrote the world to have always had many humans, with Narnia just being a particular country with a lot of fantasy creatures. With human settlements around Narnia, "the White Witch would not have suspected Edmund of being a dwarf who shaved his beard – there would be far more simple and obvious explanations for his origin. And in fact, in this revised world it is not entirely clear why were the four Pevensie children singled out for the Thrones of Narnia, over so many other humans in the world."

=== Accusations of gender stereotyping ===
In later years, both Lewis and the Chronicles have been criticised (often by other authors of fantasy fiction) for gender role stereotyping, though other authors have defended Lewis in this area. Most allegations of sexism centre on the description of Susan Pevensie in The Last Battle when Lewis writes that Susan is "no longer a friend of Narnia" and interested "in nothing nowadays except nylons and lipstick and invitations".

Philip Pullman, inimical to Lewis on many fronts, calls the Narnia stories "monumentally disparaging of women". His interpretation of the Susan passages reflects this view:

Susan, like Cinderella, is undergoing a transition from one phase of her life to another. Lewis didn't approve of that. He didn't like women in general, or sexuality at all, at least at the stage in his life when he wrote the Narnia books. He was frightened and appalled at the notion of wanting to grow up.

In fantasy author Neil Gaiman's short story "The Problem of Susan" (2004), an elderly woman, Professor Hastings, deals with the grief and trauma of her entire family's death in a train crash. Although the woman's maiden name is not revealed, details throughout the story strongly imply that this character is the elderly Susan Pevensie. The story is written for an adult audience and deals with issues of sexuality and violence and through it Gaiman presents a critique of Lewis's treatment of Susan, as well as the problem of evil as it relates to punishment and salvation.

In her contribution to The Chronicles of Narnia and Philosophy, Karin Fry, an assistant professor of philosophy at the University of Wisconsin, Stevens Point, notes that "the most sympathetic female characters in The Chronicles are consistently the ones who question the traditional roles of women and prove their worth to Aslan through actively engaging in the adventures just like the boys." Fry goes on to say:

The characters have positive and negative things to say about both male and female characters, suggesting an equality between sexes. However, the problem is that many of the positive qualities of the female characters seem to be those by which they can rise above their femininity ... The superficial nature of stereotypical female interests is condemned.

Nathan Ross notes that "Much of the plot of 'Wardrobe' is told exclusively from the point of view of Susan and Lucy. It is the girls who witness Aslan being killed and coming back to life – a unique experience from which the boys are excluded. Throughout, going through many highly frightening and shocking moments, Susan and Lucy behave with grown up courage and responsibility. Their experiences are told in full, over several chapters, while what the boys do at the same time – preparing an army and going into battle – is relegated to the background. This arrangement of material clearly implies that what girls saw and did was the more important. Given the commonly held interpretation – that Aslan is Jesus Christ and that what the girls saw was a no less than a reenacting of the Crucifixion – this order of priorities makes perfect sense".

Taking a different stance altogether, Monika B. Hilder provides a thorough examination of the feminine ethos apparent in each book of the series, and proposes that critics tend to misread Lewis's representation of gender. As she puts it "...we assume that Lewis is sexist when he is in fact applauding the 'feminine' heroic. To the extent that we have not examined our own chauvinism, we demean the 'feminine' qualities and extol the 'masculine' – not noticing that Lewis does the opposite."

There have been other instances where C.S. Lewis's writings have been accused of gender stereotyping of women beyond The Chronicles of Narnia. Ursula K. Le Guin reviewing The Dark Tower in her 1989 book Dancing at the Edge of the World says "The spitefulness shown towards women in these tales is remarkable [...] There's a good deal of hatred in Lewis, and it is frightening hatred, because this gentle, brilliant, loving, devout man never saw the need even to rationalize it, let alone apologize for it. He was self-righteous in his faith. That may be permissible to a militant Christian; but it is not permissible to a highly intelligent, highly educated man to be self-righteous in his opinions and prejudices."

=== Accusations of racism ===
In addition to sexism, Pullman and others have also accused the Narnia series of fostering racism. Over the alleged racism in The Horse and His Boy, newspaper editor Kyrie O'Connor wrote:

While the book's storytelling virtues are enormous, you don't have to be a bluestocking of political correctness to find some of this fantasy anti-Arab, or anti-Eastern, or anti-Ottoman. With all its stereotypes, mostly played for belly laughs, there are moments you'd like to stuff this story back into its closet.

Gregg Easterbrook, writing in The Atlantic, stated that "the Calormenes, are unmistakable Muslim stand-ins", Nicholas Wanberg has argued, echoing claims by Mervyn Nicholson, that accusations of racism in the books are "an oversimplification", but he asserts that the stories employ beliefs about human aesthetics, including equating dark skin with ugliness, that have been traditionally associated with racist thought.

Critics also argue whether Lewis's work presents a positive or negative view of colonialism. Nicole DuPlessis favors the anticolonial view, claiming "the negative effects of colonial exploitations and the themes of animals' rights and responsibility to the environment are emphasized in Lewis's construction of a community of living things. Through the negative examples of illegitimate rulers, Lewis constructs the 'correct' relationship between humans and nature, providing examples of rulers like Caspian who fulfil their responsibilities to the environment." Clare Etcherling counters with her claim that "those 'illegitimate' rulers are often very dark-skinned" and that the only "legitimate rulers are those sons and daughters of Adam and Eve who adhere to Christian conceptions of morality and stewardship – either white English children (such as Peter) or Narnians who possess characteristics valued and cultivated by the British (such as Caspian)."

== Adaptations ==
=== Television ===
The Lion, the Witch and the Wardrobe was first adapted in 1967. Comprising ten episodes of thirty minutes each, the screenplay was written by Trevor Preston and directed by Helen Standage.

The Lion, the Witch and the Wardrobe was adapted again in 1979, this time as an animated cartoon co-produced by Bill Melendez and the Children's Television Workshop, with a screenplay by David D. Connell.

Between 1988 and 1990, The Lion, the Witch and the Wardrobe, Prince Caspian, The Voyage of the Dawn Treader and The Silver Chair were adapted as three TV serials.

=== Film ===
==== Walden Media ====
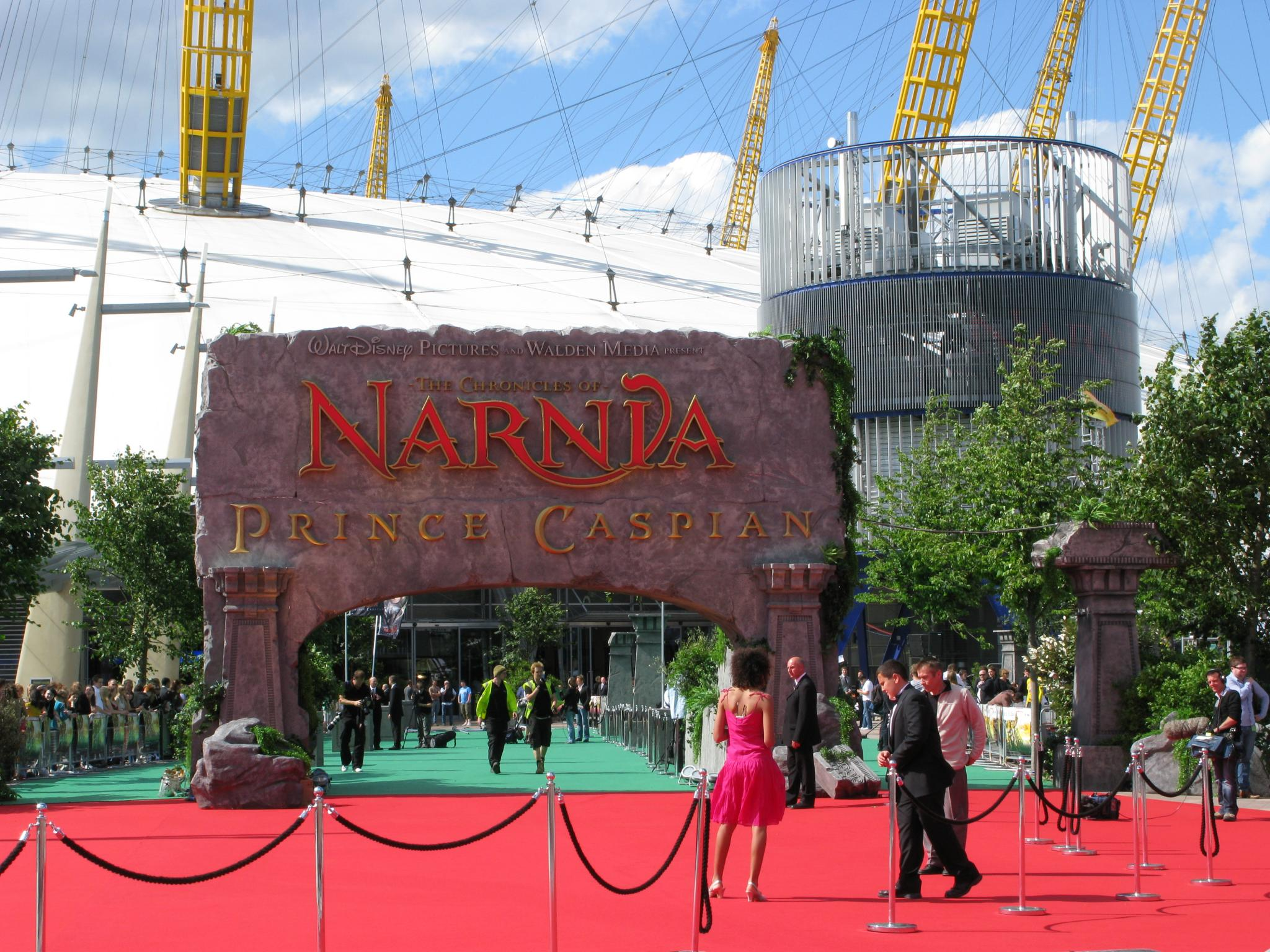
The premiere of The Chronicles of Narnia: Prince Caspian in 2008

Sceptical that any cinematic adaptation could render the more fantastical elements and characters of the story realistically, Lewis never sold the film rights to the Narnia series. In answering a letter with a question posed by a child in 1957, asking if the Narnia series could be adapted to television, C. S. Lewis wrote back: "They'd be no good on TV. Humanised beasts can't be presented to the eye without at once becoming either hideous or ridiculous. I wish the idiots who run the film world [would] realize that there are stories which are for the ear alone."

The first novel adapted was The Lion, the Witch and the Wardrobe. Released in December 2005, The Chronicles of Narnia: The Lion, the Witch and the Wardrobe was produced by Walden Media, distributed by Walt Disney Pictures, and directed by Andrew Adamson, with a screenplay by Ann Peacock, Stephen McFeely and Christopher Markus. The second novel adapted was The Chronicles of Narnia: Prince Caspian. Released in 2008, it was co-produced by Walden Media and Walt Disney Pictures, co-written and directed by Andrew Adamson, with Screenwriters including Christopher Markus & Stephen McFeely. In December 2008, Disney pulled out of financing the remainder of the Chronicles of Narnia film series. However, Walden Media and 20th Century Fox eventually co-produced The Chronicles of Narnia: The Voyage of the Dawn Treader, which was released in December 2010.

In May 2012, producer Douglas Gresham confirmed that Walden Media's contract with the C.S. Lewis Estate had expired, and that there was a moratorium on producing any Narnia films outside of Walden Media. On 1 October 2013, it was announced that the C.S. Lewis Company had entered into an agreement with the Mark Gordon Company to jointly develop and produce The Chronicles of Narnia: The Silver Chair. On 26 April 2017, Joe Johnston was hired to direct the film. In October, Johnston said filming was expected to begin in late 2018.

==== Netflix ====
On 3 October 2018, the C.S. Lewis Company announced that Netflix had acquired the rights to new film and television series adaptations of the Narnia books. According to Fortune, this was the first time that rights to the entire Narnia catalogue had been held by a single company. Entertainment One, which had acquired production rights to a fourth Narnia film, also joined the series. Mark Gordon, Douglas Gresham and Vincent Sieber were announced as executive producers. On 3 July 2023, it was announced that Greta Gerwig had been hired to write and direct at least two Narnia films for Netflix. Gerwig's adaptation will release in theaters (including IMAX and premium large format) on February 12, 2027, before premiering on Netflix on April 2, 2027. In March and April 2025, listings from Production Weekly and Production List referred to the production as Narnia: The Magician's Nephew. The filming for the first film began on August 11, 2025 in London, and concluded on January 31, 2026.

=== Radio ===
The BBC produced dramatisations of all seven novels starting in the late 1980s and running into the 1990s. They were originally broadcast on BBC Radio 4 In the UK. BBC Audiobooks released both audio cassette and compact disc versions of the series.

Between 1998 and 2002, Focus on the Family produced radio dramatisations by Paul McCusker of the entire series through its Radio Theatre programme. Over one hundred performers took part including Paul Scofield as the storyteller and David Suchet as Aslan. Accompanied by an original orchestral score and cinema-quality digital sound design, the series was hosted by Lewis's stepson Douglas Gresham and ran for just over 22 hours. Recordings of the entire adaptation were released on compact disc between 1999 and 2003.

=== Stage ===
In 1984, Vanessa Ford Productions presented The Lion, the Witch and the Wardrobe at London's Westminster Theatre. Adapted by Glyn Robbins, the play was directed by Richard Williams and designed by Marty Flood. The production was later revived at Westminster and The Royalty Theatre and went on tour until 1997. Productions of other tales from The Chronicles were also staged, including The Voyage of the Dawn Treader (1986), The Magician's Nephew (1988) and The Horse and His Boy (1990).

In 1997, Trumpets Inc., a Filipino Christian theatre and musical production company, produced a musical rendition of The Lion, The Witch and The Wardrobe that Douglas Gresham, Lewis's stepson, has openly declared that he feels is the closest to Lewis's intent. The book and lyrics were written by Jaime del Mundo and Luna Inocian, while the music was composed by Lito Villareal.

The Royal Shakespeare Company premiered The Lion, the Witch and the Wardrobe in Stratford-upon-Avon in 1998. The novel was adapted by Adrian Mitchell. The show was originally directed by Adrian Noble and designed by Anthony Ward, with the revival directed by Lucy Pitman-Wallace. Well received by audiences, the production was periodically re-staged by the Royal Shakespeare Company for several years afterwards.

In 2022, The Logos Theater, of Taylors, South Carolina, created a stage adaptation of The Horse and His Boy, with later performances at the Museum of the Bible and Ark Encounter.

== See also ==
- Outline of Narnia
