= King Francis =

King Francis may refer to:

- Francis I of France (1494–1547)
- Francis II of France (1544–1560)
- Francis I, Holy Roman Emperor (1708–1765), also King of Germany
- Francis II, Holy Roman Emperor (1768–1835), also King of Hungary and Bohemia
- Francis I of the Two Sicilies (1777–1830)
- Francis II of the Two Sicilies (1836–1894)
- Franz Joseph I (1830–1916), Emperor of Austria, and also King of Hungary and Bohemia
- Francisco de Asís, Duke of Cádiz (1822–1902), King Consort of Spain

== See also ==
- King Frank, character in the 1955 novel, The Magician's Nephew
