= The Lion, the Witch and the Wardrobe (1979 film) =

1979 animated TV film

- UK VHS cover
- Based on: The Lion, the Witch and the Wardrobe by C. S. Lewis
- Written by: David D. Connell; Bill Melendez
- Directed by: Bill Melendez
- Starring: Rachel Warren; Simon Adams; Nicholas Barnes; Sheila Hancock; Arthur Lowe; Leo McKern; Don Parker; Leslie Phillips; Beth Porter; Liz Proud; Susan Sokol; Stephen Thorne
- Composer: Michael J. Lewis
- Countries of origin: United Kingdom; United States
- Original language: English
- No. of episodes: 2

Production
- Executive producer: David D. Connell
- Producer: Steven Cuitlahuac Melendez
- Editors: Michael Crane; Mick Manning; José Pallejá
- Running time: 95 minutes
- Production companies: Children's Television Workshop; Bill Melendez Productions; Episcopal Radio-TV Foundation

Original release
- Network: CBS
- Release: April 1 – April 2, 1979

The Lion, the Witch and the Wardrobe is an animated television program that was broadcast in two parts on CBS on April 1 and 2, 1979, based on the 1950 novel The Lion, the Witch and the Wardrobe by C. S. Lewis. It was adapted by animator Bill Melendez. In the United Kingdom, it was broadcast on ITV on April 6, 1980.

== Plot ==
When the Pevensie Children Peter, Susan, Edmund, and Lucy go to Professor Kirke's mansion due to the air raids of World War II, they stumble into an old wardrobe which transports them to a magical land called Narnia with talking animals, fauns, hags, the oppressive White Witch and the great lion Aslan. There they meet the friendly Mr. and Mrs. Beaver, who help them on their quest to find Aslan the great lion. Only he can help save Lucy's friend Mr. Tumnus (the faun) from the White Witch. They have a fun mysterious time there, and ultimately end up ruling as kings and queens, until they end up back home. The Professor tells the children that they will return to Narnia one day.

== Production notes ==
The rights to produce the television program were given to the Episcopal Radio TV Foundation in the mid-1950s when C. S. Lewis was recording the Episcopal Series of the Protestant Hour radio programs. Dr. Ted Baehr was elected President of the Episcopal Radio TV Foundation as The Lion, the Witch and the Wardrobe was preparing to be broadcast by CBS, and he supervised the distribution of the subsequent video. The CBS program had 37 million viewers and won two Emmy Awards.

== Voices ==
Character	UK Version	US Version
Lucy Pevensie	Lisa Moss	Rachel Warren
Edmund Pevensie	Nicholas Barnes	Simon Adams
Peter Pevensie	Stephen Garlick	Reg Williams
Susan Pevensie	Shelley Crowhurst	Susan Sokol
Jadis (The White Witch)	Sheila Hancock	Beth Porter
Mr. Beaver	Arthur Lowe	Don Parker
Professor	Leo McKern	Dick Vosburgh
Mr. Tumnus	Leslie Phillips	Victor Spinetti
Mrs. Beaver	June Whitfield	Liz Proud
Dwarf	Peter Hawkins	Unknown
Fox	Peter Hawkins	Unknown
Aslan	Stephen Thorne	Stephen Thorne

The only actor to appear in both versions is Stephen Thorne (who voiced Aslan).

== Differences between novel and animated film ==
- The meeting with Father Christmas, as well as the season's arrival, is omitted (though he is mentioned by some Talking Animals). Instead, Aslan gives the children their weapons.
- There is a point in which eventually all four of the children enter the wardrobe (albeit two are still skeptical of Narnia). In the novel, this is to escape a housekeeper whom they do not like, but in the cartoon there is no specified reason.
- The novel, and other adaptations, clearly portray the children as evacuees staying at the home of the Professor during World War II. In this cartoon, no particular reason is stated for them staying there.
- No mention is made of World War II, and the clothing style of the children suggests a 1960s-70s setting.
- Rather than ask Edmund what he would most like to eat (whereupon he chooses Turkish delight), as in the novel, The Witch simply offers him Turkish delight directly.
- The wolf Captain of the White Witch's Secret Police is named "Fenris Ulf" (like in early American editions of the book) instead of "Maugrim".
- Mrs. Macready, the Professor's housekeeper, was dropped from the film, and instead of the children being chased into the Wardrobe in the spare room, they all decided to try to get to Narnia all together after the Professor had discussed the truth about it with Peter and Susan.
- The White Witch's dwarf was last seen before the battle and it is unknown what happened to him after the battle.
- In the cartoon, the Minotaurs are on Aslan's side. In the novel, the Minotaurs work for the White Witch.

== Releases ==
- Released on VHS in 1985 and 1991 and 1998.
- Released on DVD on Regions 1, 2, and 4 in 2006.

== VHS UK history ==
- Children's Video Library (1985)
