= White Witch =

Fictional sorceress

Jadis, the White Witch
- Narnia character
- Jadis, the White Witch with Maugrim and a black dwarf. Art by Leo and Diane Dillon.
- Created by: C. S. Lewis
- Portrayed by: Barbara Kellerman (1988 TV serial); Tilda Swinton (2005 theatrical film); Emma Mackey (upcoming Netflix adaptation)

In-universe information
- Race: Humanoid (Northern Witch)– (rumoured by rivals to be half-Jinn, half-Giant)
- Title(s): Her Imperial Majesty, Jadis, Queen of Narnia, Chatelaine of Cair Paravel, Empress of the Lone Islands (Former: Her Imperial Majesty Jadis, Empress of Charn)
- Family: Unnamed sister (deceased; killed by Jadis)
- Nationality: Charn

Jadis is a fictional character and the main antagonist of The Lion, the Witch and the Wardrobe (1950) and The Magician's Nephew (1955) in C. S. Lewis's series The Chronicles of Narnia. She is commonly referred to as the White Witch in The Lion, the Witch and the Wardrobe, as she is the Witch who froze Narnia in the Hundred Years Winter.

Some recent editions of the books include brief notes, added by later editors, that describe the cast of characters. As Lewis scholar Peter Schakel points out, the notes' description of Jadis and the Queen of Underland (the main antagonist of The Silver Chair) "states incorrectly that the Queen of Underland is an embodiment of Jadis". Beyond characterising the two as "Northern Witches", Lewis's text does not connect them.

== Character history ==
Jadis was born on an unknown date long before the creation of Narnia. In The Lion, the Witch and the Wardrobe she is identified by a character as a descendant of giants and Adam's first wife (Lilith):

She'd like us to believe [that she is a human], and it's on that that she bases her claim to be Queen. But she's no Daughter of Eve. She comes of your father Adam's ... first wife, her they called Lilith. And she was one of the Jinn. That's what she comes from on one side. And on the other she comes of the giants. No, no, there isn't a drop of real Human blood in the Witch. (8.35)

Jadis died in battle in Narnian year 1000, meaning that she lived for well over 1,000 years.

=== The Magician's Nephew ===
In The Magician's Nephew, Jadis is introduced as the last Queen of Charn, a city in an entirely different world from Narnia. She was the last of a long line of kings and queens, who were good in the beginning but grew evil over many generations and conquered the entire world of Charn, ruling it as despots. Jadis, a powerful sorceress, fought a bloody war of rebellion against her sister. On the point of defeat, Jadis chose not to submit, but instead spoke the Deplorable Word, a powerful spell which destroyed all life on Charn except her own. She then cast a spell of enchanted sleep upon herself to await someone who could rescue her from Charn.

Many years later, a 12-year-old Digory Kirke and his friend Polly Plummer arrive in the ruins of Charn through Digory's uncle's magic. The children find the bell that Jadis left to break the spell. Despite Polly's warning not to ring the bell, Digory does so. Jadis is awakened and by holding on to them is transported with them back to London in the year 1900. She initially aims to conquer the world to which she is transported, but finds that her magic does not work there. Digory, seeking to correct his mistake, attempts to transport her back to Charn, but they end up instead in the world of Narnia at the moment of its creation by the lion Aslan. As Aslan approaches, she attacks him with the rod of iron she has torn from a London lamp post with her great physical strength; when this has no effect, she flees.

Jadis makes her way to the garden on a mountain west of Narnia, where she eats an apple that she believes will make her immortal and give her eternal life. However, this supposed immortality comes at a cost: her skin is bleached white, and the evil in her heart causes her eternal misery. She cannot stand the sight of the tree that Aslan has Digory plant in Narnia, grown from the fruit of the garden, and she thus stays to the north of Narnia, working to develop her magic.

Meanwhile, the land of Narnia remains the domain of animals (chosen animals are given the ability to speak, and become pillars of society) and is not troubled by the Witch nor any other enemy for many hundreds of years.

=== The Lion, the Witch and the Wardrobe ===
In The Lion, the Witch and the Wardrobe, set 1,000 Narnian years after the events of The Magician's Nephew, the tree that kept Jadis at bay has died, and Jadis has usurped power over Narnia. She is now known as the White Witch, and is served by various races including Wolves (who make up her secret police), Black Dwarves, Giants, Werewolves, Tree Spirits that are on her side, Ghouls, Boggles, Ogres, Minotaurs, Cruels, Hags, Spectres, People of the Toadstools, Incubi, Wraiths, Horrors, Efreets, Orknies, Sprites, Wooses, Ettins, Poisonous Plant Spirits, Evil Apes, Giant Bats, Vultures, and creatures that (as Lewis writes) are "so horrible that if I told you, your parents probably wouldn't let you read this book."

The Witch's magic is now powerful, and with her wand she can turn enemies to stone. Many Narnians who have objected to her rule have ended up being captured by the Witch and her forces and turned into stone in the courtyard or the interior of her castle, which stands isolated between two hills in the north of Narnia. Stories of this grim fate have spread around Narnia from the few Narnians who have been taken there and were then released or managed to escape.

She styles herself "Her Imperial Majesty Jadis, Queen of Narnia, Chatelaine of Cair Paravel, Empress of the Lone Islands", and she casts Narnia into an endless winter with no Christmas. She fears a prophecy that four humans – two sons of Adam and two daughters of Eve – will bring about the end of her reign and ultimately her life, and orders all Narnians to bring any human they come across to her.

By the time the Pevensie children arrive in Narnia, Jadis has ruled for 100 years, although a mere 40 years have passed on Earth since she first arrived in Narnia. The children were staying as wartime evacuees at the country home of Digory Kirke, now an ageing professor.

She first meets Edmund Pevensie while riding on her sledge through the land of Narnia, enchants him with magical Turkish delight, and tempts him to betray his siblings by offering to make him her heir. She wants all four of them, although at this stage only Edmund and his sister Lucy have been in Narnia. The four Pevensie children arrive together in Narnia soon afterwards, and Edmund strays to the Witch after he and the other children are taken in by Mr and Mrs Beaver. While he understands now that the "Queen of Narnia" (as she had introduced herself) and the White Witch are one and the same, he is still determined to taste more Turkish Delight – and remains convinced that the Witch would keep her promise to make him heir to her throne. In the meantime, her Secret Police had captured Tumnus the faun, who had harboured Lucy on her first visit to Narnia, after discovering that he had disobeyed the Witch’s orders to hand over any humans to her.

But with the approach of Aslan, her magical winter thaws. Edmund receives a hostile reception from the White Witch upon arriving at her castle without his siblings, who is even angrier when he informs her that Aslan has arrived in Narnia. The harshness of the Witch's winter makes Edmund realise that he has been wrong in thinking that her side was the right side, and he realises the full extent of her evil when he witnesses her angrily turning a party of creatures into stone after their revelation that Father Christmas had been in Narnia.

A wolf eventually reaches Jadis and informs her that Edmund's siblings have reached Aslan's camp and that one of them killed Maugrim. Jadis sends the wolf off to rally her army as speedily as they can, as she prepares to kill Edmund as a traitor. Aslan's army advances to rescue Edmund as Jadis uses a spell to conceal herself and her dwarf.

Jadis then arrives at the Stone Table, and meets Aslan for a parley, and insists on her right, as the first to rebel against Aslan, to take the life of Edmund as a traitor. She accepts Aslan's offer of his own life as substitute, knowing that without him the Pevensies cannot stand against her. Aslan keeps this pact secret from his followers. Jadis has Aslan bound at the Stone Table, and an ogre shaves his mane. She tells him that his sacrifice won't save Edmund and that he has given her Narnia forever. Then she kills him with a stone knife. Susan and Lucy, who followed Aslan from their encampment, witness his death from bushes nearby.

Jadis is unaware, however, of a deeper magic from before Narnia's founding. As a willing innocent victim who has offered his life in a traitor's stead, Aslan is revived. He then heads to her castle and restores all her statues to life. He brings them as reinforcements to the battle at Beruna against the witch's army, who are already battling against Aslan’s followers. Her army is defeated, and Aslan himself kills Jadis. Most of her followers are killed and the remnants of her army who do not surrender flee and are later killed by Aslan's followers.

=== References and comparisons in other Narnia books ===
In Prince Caspian, 1,300 years after the Witch's death, Narnia has been conquered by the Telmarines, a human race who believe they have wiped out Narnia's population of mythical beings and talking animals. The old Narnians, however, are still very much alive and have been driven into hiding, and they rebel under the leadership of the disinherited Telmarine heir, Prince Caspian. When their fight against the Telmarines gets off to a bad start, a black dwarf (Nikabrik), a hag, and a wer-wolf (to use Lewis's spelling) plan to resurrect Jadis to fight for them, as they consider her a lesser evil than the current ruler, King Miraz, despite Caspian’s insistence that the Witch was far worse than Miraz, and his tutor’s insistence that the Witch is dead. They are then killed in a melee which involves Caspian, his tutor Dr Cornelius, and Peter and Edmund.

Jadis does not appear in The Voyage of the Dawn Treader, though the stone knife she used to kill Aslan at the Stone Table has been found on Ramandu's island by three of the Seven Great Lords of Narnia who had been banished there several years earlier. Disagreeing on what course to take, one of them takes up the knife to use against the other two, whereupon all three fall into an enchanted sleep. The knife may be intended as an analogue to the Holy Lance, the spear used to pierce Jesus Christ according to the Gospel of John.

In The Silver Chair, 1,356 years after her death, Jadis is described as one of the "Northern Witches", along with the Lady of the Green Kirtle – a new enemy to the good animals and humans who now inhabit Narnia. Glimfeather the Owl speculates that the Green Lady may be "of the same crew" as the White Witch. This has led to speculation by some readers that Jadis and the Lady of the Green Kirtle may be the same person. Lewis's text does not support this (See Lady of the Green Kirtle for further discussion). Lewis never clarifies the Green Lady's origins, or what connection she has to the White Witch.

The "Green Lady" had first entered Narnia in serpent form and killed the wife of King Caspian, and later re-emerged in human form to lure away Caspian's son Rilian and place him under an enchantment in the underworld. Eustace Scrubb and Jill Pole reach the underworld with their guide, Puddleglum the marshwiggle, and rescue Rilian – who kills the Green Lady before they return to Narnia.

== Characteristics ==
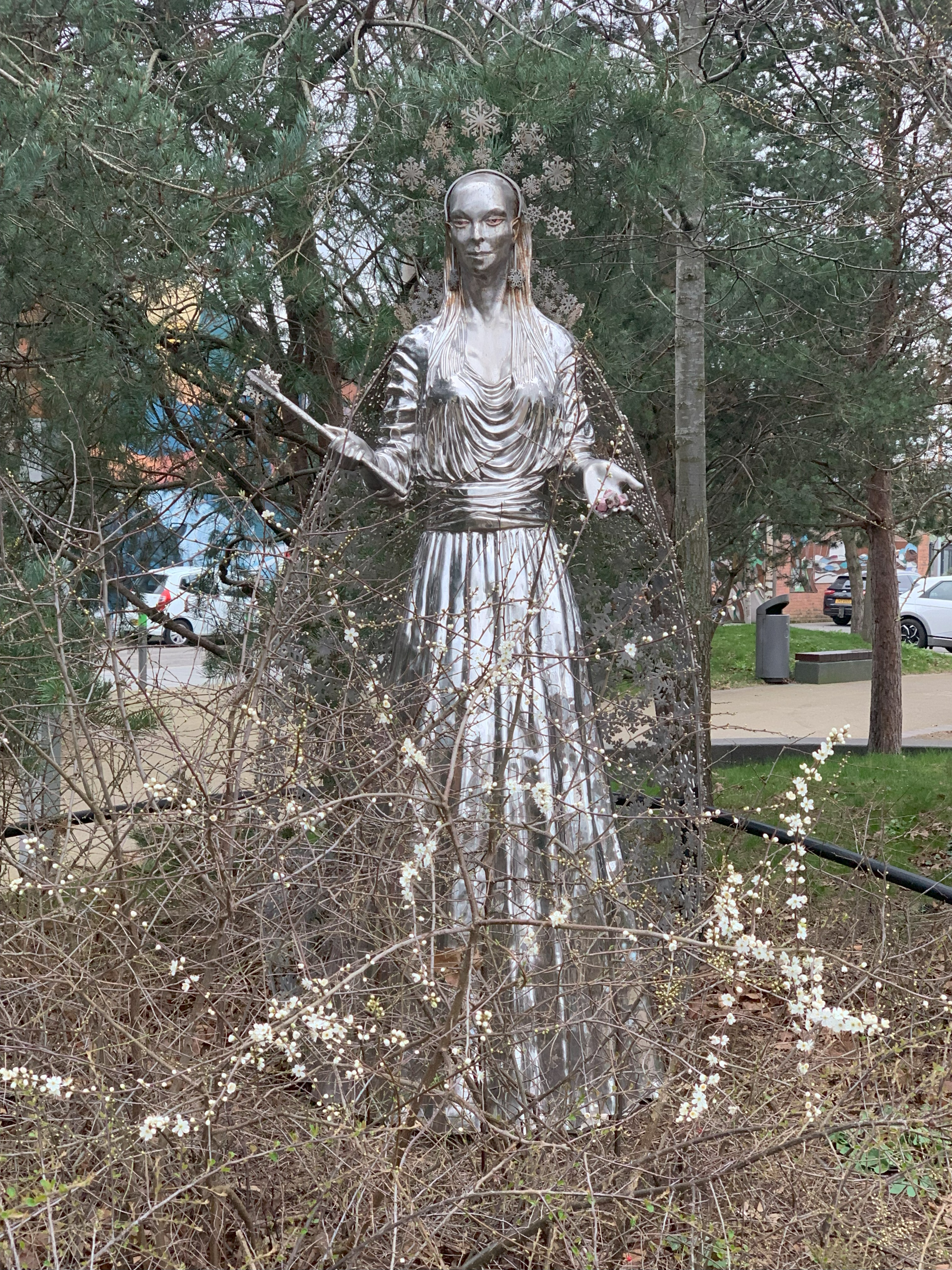
White Witch (by Maurice Harron (2016), CS Lewis Square, Belfast).

Jadis is described as a beautiful, extremely tall, and imposing woman, who enchants Digory Kirke, Andrew Ketterley and Edmund Pevensie on first encounters. She is seven feet tall, as were all members of the Royal Family of Charn. After eating the fruit of eternal life, her skin becomes as white as paper.

A natural-born sorceress and a cunning strategist, Jadis is arrogant and cruel, considering herself above all rules and viewing others as tools to be used or obstacles to be demolished. After she eats the Fruit of Everlasting Life, selfishly and against the written admonition on the gate, she discovers that her sense of inner power and life is amplified. Her callousness and sense of entitlement are most clearly demonstrated when she uses the Deplorable Word in Charn to vanquish her sister, even though the Word would eradicate all life in that world but her own. She prefers to destroy that entire world than submit to her sister's authority and shows afterward a remorseless pride in her actions.

Though her magic disappears when she leaves Charn, she manages to build it up again in Narnia's world, exercising both her previous experience and her privilege to witness a new world's dawning to become again a sorceress of formidable power, though she is still outclassed by Aslan. She eventually usurps the throne of Narnia, using her magic to cast the land into perpetual winter. Her most feared weapon is her wand, whose magic is capable of turning people into stone. The petrified remains of her enemies decorate the halls of her castle. For the brief time that Jadis is on Earth, she has no magical power but retains her phenomenal strength. This is demonstrated when she battles with Metropolitan Police in London, wielding the cross-bar she wrenched from a lamp post. The same cross-bar is taken into Narnia during its magical creation by Aslan, and grows into the full lamp post encountered by Lucy Pevensie many years later.

== Portrayals ==
=== Radio ===
The voice of Jadis was provided by Elizabeth Counsell in Focus on the Family's radio drama versions of The Lion, the Witch and the Wardrobe and The Magician's Nephew. Counsell also made a cameo appearance as a lamb in The Last Battle. The distribution rights to this version were later purchased by the BBC. In an earlier 1988 BBC radio version, she was played by Rosemary Martin.

=== Television ===
Jadis, the White Witch, portrayed by Barbara Kellerman in the BBC miniseries The Chronicles of Narnia (1988, season 1).

- The White Witch was played by Elizabeth Wallace in the 1967 British TV series The Lion the Witch and the Wardrobe.
- In the sixth episode of The Young Ones, during a game of hide-and-seek, Vyvyan attempts to hide in a wardrobe. He ends up in Narnia, and meets the White Witch, portrayed by actress Justine Lord. She approaches him much the same way as with Edmund in the book, but Vyvyan is uninterested, and tries to hide in an empty tree that leads back to the apartment, against her protests.
- American actress Beth Porter provided the voice of the White Witch for the 1979 animated television adaptation of The Lion, the Witch, and the Wardrobe (for the British release, Sheila Hancock's voice was dubbed in). In that version, Aslan lunges towards the White Witch and she disappears in a cloud of smoke upon her defeat.
- English actress Barbara Kellerman played the White Witch in the 1988 BBC miniseries The Chronicles of Narnia season 1, The Lion, the Witch and the Wardrobe (Kellerman was retained as the hag in season 2 and the Lady of the Green Kirtle in season 3, characters from the second and fourth Narnia novels). After her wand is broken, she runs up the ravine, only for Aslan to arrive with reinforcements and roar enough for the ground to shake and the White Witch to lose her balance and fall to her death.

=== Theatrical film series ===
Tilda Swinton as Jadis, the White Witch. Her collar is made from Aslan's mane, taken during his sacrifice.

In the 2005 Walt Disney Pictures feature film The Chronicles of Narnia: The Lion, the Witch and the Wardrobe, she was portrayed by British actress Tilda Swinton. Swinton's performance won particular acclaim among fans and critics. BBC film critic Stella Papamichael wrote:

As the cold-hearted White Witch, Tilda Swinton sets the tempo for this bracing adventure. She is a pristine picture of evil, like the spectre of Nazism that forces the children out of London to the sanctuary of a country manor.

Tilda Swinton was nominated for an MTV Movie Award for Best Villain for her performance as the White Witch in The Lion, the Witch and the Wardrobe, but lost to Hayden Christensen for his performance as Anakin Skywalker/Darth Vader in Star Wars: Episode III – Revenge of the Sith.

Swinton reprised her role as the White Witch in the 2008 sequel The Chronicles of Narnia: Prince Caspian. In a departure from the novel, Nikabrik and his fellow conspirators (a hag and werewolf) use the White Witch's retrieved wand to conjure an apparition of Jadis within a mystical wall of ice. She tries to coax Caspian and then Peter into offering her a drop of their blood so that she can come back to life, promising to lend her powers to their fight against King Miraz once she is made whole. However, Edmund shatters the ice, and the apparition vanishes.

Swinton reprised White Witch again in the 20th Century Fox film adaptation of The Voyage of the Dawn Treader, only as a manifestation of the Dark Island preying on Edmund's fears, a mental test that Edmund overcomes as he manages to kill the Dark Island's sea serpent, a manifestation of his fear. The apparition disappears, screaming in defeat.

Swinton had expressed interest in returning to the role once more in a film adaptation of The Magician's Nephew.

In Greta Gerwig's adaptation of the Narnia novels for the streaming service Netflix, Jadis the White Witch will be played by Emma Mackey.

=== Literature ===
Jadis appears in the Neil Gaiman short story "The Problem of Susan" which appeared in the 2006 collection Fragile Things.

== Commemoration ==
In 2011, the White Witch was one of eight British magical figures, which included characters from Arthurian legend, Harry Potter, and Discworld, commemorated on a series of UK postage stamps issued by the Royal Mail.

== See also ==
- "The Snow Queen"
