= Nicholas Barnes =

British actor (born 1967)

Nicholas Barnes (born 4 December 1967) is a British actor. Currently retired from acting, he is a successful novelist, having written such full-length thrillers as The Dickens Project, Grimm and The Drowned Cathedral.

== Selected credits ==
- 2008: Broken (short film) as "Bill"
- 2000: My Hero as "Police Constable"
- 2000: Bad Girls as "Security Guard"
- 1994: Romeo & Juliet (UK television movie) as "Balthasar"
- 1989: The Bretts as "Giles Browning"
- 1989: Ball-Trap on the Cote Sauvage (TV movie) as "Paul Britcamp"
- 1988: Casualty as "Eric"
- 1988: The Bill as "Squatter"
- 1987: Acorn Antiques as "Roberts - Scriptwriter"
- 1987: Scoop (TV movie) as "Bateson"
- 1986-87: No 73 (UK television series) as "Geoffrey Edwards" (7 episodes)
- 1987: A Killing on the Exchange (UK television miniseries) as "Billy"
- 1984: Goodbye Mr. Chips (UK television series) as "Marston"
- 1981: Silas as "Bein-Godik"
- 1981: Outland as "Paul"
- 1979: The Lion, the Witch and the Wardrobe as "Edmund" (voice)
- 1979: Jack on the Box as "Dickie Ducker"
- 1978: Heidi (UK television series) as "Peter" (22 episodes)
- 1978: Enemy at the Door (TV series) as "Bobby Beauchamp"
- 1977: Anna Karenina as "Grisha"
- 1977: The Brute as "Tim Shepherd"
- 1976: The Deadly Females as "Simon"
- 1974: Barlow at Large as "David Rees"
- 1973: Armchair Theatre (1973 episode: "The Golden Road", as "Schoolfriend")
- 1973: Armchair 30 (TV series; 1973 episode: "Simon Fenton's Story"; Barnes played the title role)

== Family ==
Nicholas Barnes and his first wife, actress Rebecca Mitchell, were married from 1995 until 2000. On 9 April 2004, he married his second wife Aegina Berg, an American university lecturer; the couple divorced in 2012. He has been married to his third wife, designer and artist Caitlin Gill, since 24 August 2013.

== Bibliography ==
- Holmstrom, John. The Moving Picture Boy: An International Encyclopaedia from 1895 to 1995. Norwich, Michael Russell, 1996, p. 369.
