= Digory Kirke =

- Narnia character
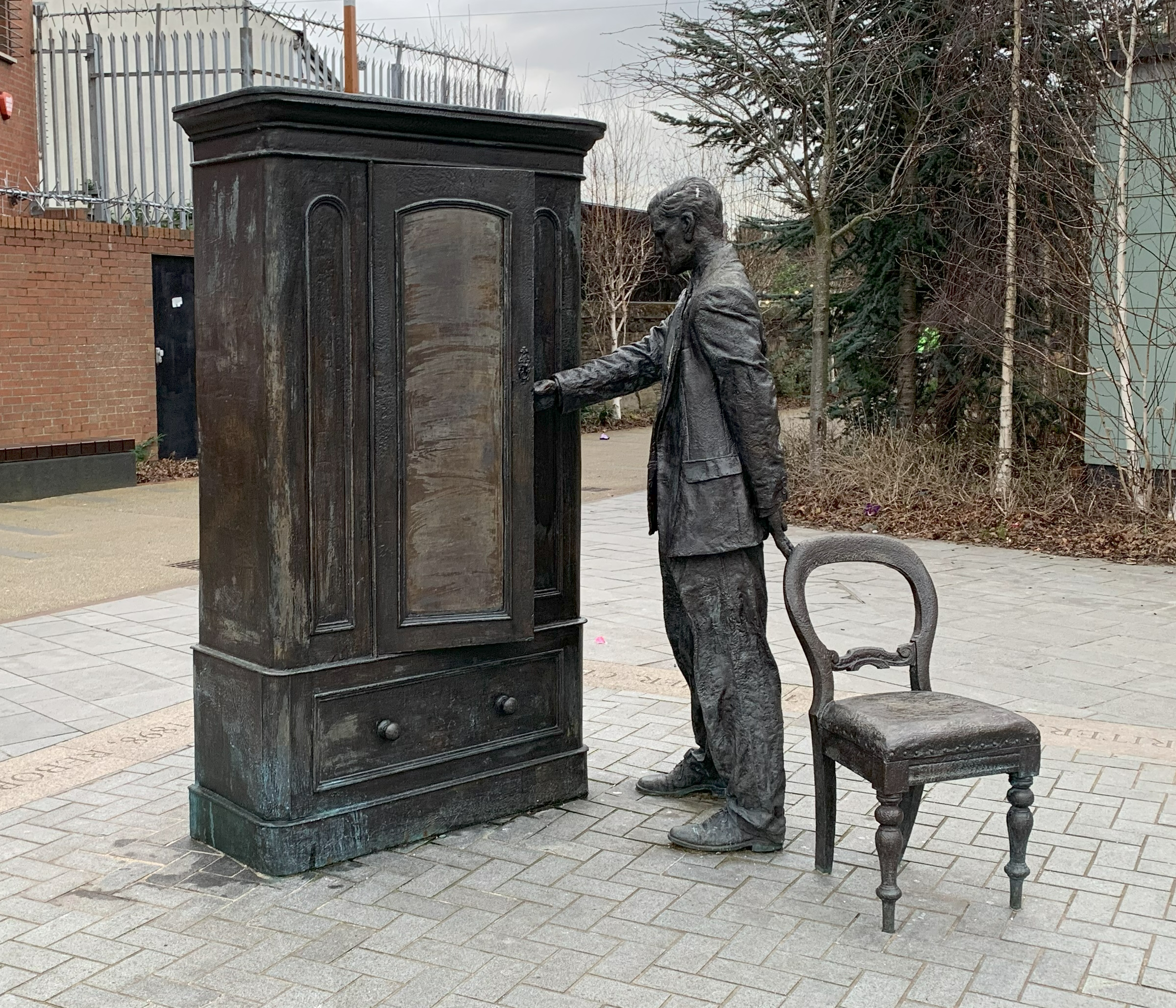
- (Ross Wilson, 1998), CS Lewis Square, Belfast.
- First appearance: The Lion, the Witch and the Wardrobe (1950)
- Last appearance: The Last Battle (1956)
- Created by: C. S. Lewis
- Portrayed by: Michael Aldridge (1988 TV serial); Jim Broadbent (2005 theatrical film); David McKenna (upcoming Netflix adaptation)

In-universe information
- Race: Human
- Gender: Male
- Occupation: Professor
- Family: Mabel Kirke (mother); Andrew Ketterley (uncle); Letitia Ketterley (aunt)
- Nationality: British

Professor Digory Kirke is a fictional character from C. S. Lewis' fantasy series The Chronicles of Narnia. He appears in three of the seven books: The Lion, the Witch and the Wardrobe, The Magician's Nephew, and The Last Battle.

In the 2005 film The Chronicles of Narnia: The Lion, the Witch and the Wardrobe, he is portrayed by Jim Broadbent. In the upcoming film Narnia: The Magician's Nephew, he is portrayed by David McKenna.

== Character biography ==
C.S. Lewis's notes, reprinted by Walter Hooper in Past Watchful Dragons, his study of the Narnian books, describes Digory as having been born in England in 1888, a year before Polly Plummer, with the events of The Magician's Nephew taking place in 1900, The Lion, the Witch and the Wardrobe in 1940, and the fatal train crash of The Last Battle in 1949.

=== The Lion, the Witch and the Wardrobe ===
Peter, Susan, Edmund, and Lucy Pevensie stay with the character, referred to in this book only as "the Professor", at his great house in the country to escape the Blitz. A wardrobe in this house leads Lucy to Narnia; when her siblings do not believe her story, the Professor speaks to them wisely and shows them that she is logically likely to be telling the truth. At the end of the story, he reassures the children that they will return to Narnia one day.

=== The Voyage of the Dawn Treader ===
The Professor is mentioned only briefly and in passing, but it is here that his surname, Kirke, is first used.

=== The Magician's Nephew ===
Digory Kirke is a young boy who lives in Victorian London with his Uncle Andrew and Andrew's sister Aunt Letty, because his father is in India and his mother is seriously ill. Uncle Andrew has made magic rings that allow whoever wears them to travel to other worlds by passing through the Wood between the Worlds. He first tricks Digory's friend Polly Plummer into trying one; when she vanishes, he manipulates Digory into following her with another ring in order to bring her back. Reunited with Polly, and finding that they can return to London through the pool from which they emerged into the Wood, Digory persuades Polly to try one of the many other pools.

They find themselves in a lifeless world called Charn, over which a dying red sun hangs. They find a great hall full of wax figures, and a golden bell. Against Polly's vehement opposition, Digory rings the bell, thus waking Queen Jadis, the last living resident of Charn, from her self-imposed enchanted sleep. Despite their attempts to shake her, Jadis follows Digory and Polly back to London, intent on conquest, where she causes havoc for an afternoon. Digory resolves to take her back to Charn, but instead accidentally brings her (and Uncle Andrew and others) into the empty world of Narnia shortly before Aslan starts creating it. Once the world is created, Jadis flees from Aslan, who sends Digory to a mysterious locked garden in the far west to retrieve an apple which, once planted, will grow a tree that will lock Jadis out of Narnia for centuries; it also has the power to cure sickness and grant immortality.

After Digory's long journey by flying horse, he arrives with Polly to find Jadis already there. Jadis tempts Digory to eat his apple himself and take another to save his ill mother. Digory, after a struggle of conscience, takes the apple to Aslan and plants it as instructed. With Aslan's permission and blessing, Digory is allowed to take an apple from this tree back to his world to cure his mother.

Soon afterwards, they inherit an elderly relative’s grand house in the countryside, and Digory plants the core in his garden, from which a new tree grows. Years later, this tree is blown down by a storm and Digory uses its wood to build the wardrobe that becomes the portal to Narnia in The Lion, the Witch and the Wardrobe.

=== The Last Battle ===
Prior to the events of the book, the now elderly Digory and Polly have been regularly meeting with the child protagonists of the other books in the series (excepting Susan) to reminisce about their adventures in Narnia. After the titular battle, they all meet again in the renewed Narnia in Aslan's Country. At the end of the book it is revealed that they have all been killed in a railway accident and are now in an eternal blessed afterlife.

=== The Le Fay Fragment ===
Published in Walter Hooper's Past Watchful Dragons: the Narnian Chronicles of C.S. Lewis, this draft story by C.S. Lewis both resembles and differs from the start of the book he would develop it into, The Magician's Nephew, describing an alternate origin story for Digory in which he is an orphan being raised by his unkind aunt but meeting Polly Plummer in almost identical circumstances as described in The Magician's Nephew. Most notably, Digory is visited by Mrs Le Fay, later referenced in The Magician's Nephew as the fairy-descended godmother of Digory's Uncle Andrew who has protected a box of Atlantean dust that Andrew ultimately uses to make the magic rings which transport Digory and Polly to the Wood Between the Worlds.

== Portrayals ==
Michael Aldridge played Digory in the 1988 BBC miniseries adaptation. Jim Broadbent played the character in the 2005 film. David McKenna will portray a young Digory in the upcoming film adaptation Narnia: The Magician's Nephew.
