= Polly Plummer =

- Narnia character
- First appearance: The Magician's Nephew (1955)
- Last appearance: The Last Battle (1956)
- Created by: C.S. Lewis

In-universe information
- Race: Human
- Gender: Female
- Nationality: English

Polly Plummer is a major fictional character from C. S. Lewis's fantasy series The Chronicles of Narnia. She appears in two of the seven books: The Magician's Nephew and The Last Battle.

== Biography ==
=== In The Magician's Nephew ===
Polly is introduced in The Magician's Nephew—which is the sixth book in the series to be published, but is the first in the internal chronology of Narnia.

In 1900, she is an 11-year-old girl who lives in London, England. She is the neighbor of Digory Kirke's aunt, with whom Digory and his gravely ill mother are staying. Polly befriends Digory, and one of the places they play together is her house's attic room, which leads into an inner-roof space that connects to the attic rooms in all the houses in their row of terrace houses. Polly uses the attic as a hide-out where she drinks ginger beer and is gradually writing a private story that she does not share with Digory.

One day, while exploring the inner roof space in the row of terrace houses, the children accidentally enter the study of Digory's Uncle Andrew. He is initially an alarming person in his own domain, but he successfully ingratiates himself with Polly and offers her a yellow ring as a gift which causes her to vanish as soon as she touches it. Uncle Andrew believes Polly has now been sent to another world and blackmails Digory into following her with another ring in order to bring her back. He wants to hear about what is occurring in the 'other place.' Digory is forced to comply, resulting in him finding himself (with Polly) in the other place. However, this is not a place as Uncle Andrew had imagined, and between Digory's sharp mind and inquisitiveness and Polly's practical caution and concern for safety, they realize that if they are careful, they can use this Wood between the Worlds in the same way as the inner roof space in the terrace houses; linking to all the worlds. The Wood is scattered with large pools as far as they can see, and they have emerged from just one. Polly and Digory come to realize that Digory's Uncle Andrew has no inkling of this reality as he is just an ignorant dabbler in arcane arts, with only pretensions to be a magician, and is not prepared to take his own risks.

After working this out, Polly and Digory decided to try a nearby pool and travel to the ruined city of Charn on a dead world that has a dying sun. There, against Polly's advice, Digory breaks an enchantment that releases Jadis, the future White Witch. Jadis follows the children back through the Wood to London. After returning home and being confined to her room for missing dinner and having wet shoes and stockings from jumping in puddles, Polly helps Digory return Jadis to the Wood, and they attempt to return her to Charn. Instead, the pool they choose takes them to the new world of Narnia, where they witness its first dawning and the creation of life by Aslan. Polly, Digory, and a cabby and his horse (who were brought along by mistake) are the only ones not alarmed by Aslan or his singing. Jadis and Uncle Andrew are both terrified; Jadis because she knows what he is and Andrew because he has no idea. After the world is created, the children and the flying talking horse Fledge (Strawberry, the Cabby's roan horse who has been transformed) fly to a walled garden in the Western Wild to retrieve a magical apple. This apple, when planted, grows into a tree that serves to protect the young land of Narnia. Aslan gave Digory an apple from the newly planted tree to heal his sick mother. Polly and Digory then return to England, where he heals his mother and buries the apple core and the rings around it.

Digory later moves away to a great house that his parents inherited from a great uncle. Polly spends nearly every holiday at their house in the country, and she and Digory remain close friends all their lives.

Polly's stolidity, friendship, morality, and sense of caution counterbalance Digory's drive, aggression, and grief. Polly's role is one of emotional and moral support (and challenge) to Digory, who is written as the protagonist. Her own sense of adventure, discovery, and wonder are no less than Digory's, however, and her experience of Narnia and the spiritual enlightenment and security that their encounter with Aslan provides give both her and Digory the basis for a significant platonic friendship throughout their lives.

=== In The Last Battle ===
In The Last Battle, the final book in the series (both chronologically and in order of publication), Polly is an adult of 60. She remains in contact with the other British "friends of Narnia" and is present with them when the apparition of Narnia's King Tirian appears to request their help. She seems like a very cheery, friendly, and wise adult; the children refer to her as "Aunt Polly". She is later killed in a railway accident and is transported to Aslan's country along with the other friends of Narnia. Once she arrives in Narnia, she and Digory become young again, and they are both dressed as royalty (and referred to as Lady Polly and Lord Digory).
