= The Magician's Nephew =

1955 children's novel by C. S. Lewis

- Dust jacket of first edition
- Author: C. S. Lewis
- Illustrator: Pauline Baynes
- Cover artist: Pauline Baynes
- Language: English
- Series: The Chronicles of Narnia
- Release number: 6
- Subject: The creation of Narnia
- Genre: Children's fantasy novel, Christian literature
- Publisher: The Bodley Head
- Publication date: 2 May 1955
- Publication place: United Kingdom
- Media type: Print (hardcover)
- Pages: 183 (first edition); 41,062 words (US)
- ISBN: 978-0-00-671683-9 (Collins, 1998; full-colour)
- OCLC: 2497740
- LC Class: PZ8.L48 Mag
- Preceded by: The Horse and His Boy
- Followed by: The Last Battle
- Text: The Magician's Nephew online

The Magician's Nephew is a portal fantasy novel by British author C. S. Lewis, published in 1955 by The Bodley Head. It is the sixth published of seven novels in The Chronicles of Narnia (1950–1956). In recent editions, which sequence the books in the chronological order of the story, it appears as the first volume of the series. Like the others, it was illustrated by Pauline Baynes whose work has been retained in many later editions. The Bodley Head was a new publisher for The Chronicles, a change from Geoffrey Bles who had published the previous five novels.

The Magician's Nephew is a prequel to the series. The middle third of the novel features the creation of the Narnia world by Aslan the lion, centred on a section of a lamp-post brought by accidental observers from London in 1900. The visitors then participate in the beginning of Narnia's history, 1000 years before The Lion, the Witch and the Wardrobe (Note: Forty years pass in our world, from 1900 to 1940, during that first millennium in Narnia. A manuscript by Lewis, the "Outline of Narnian History", dates major events in the Narnia world and simultaneous events in England. Since his death, it has been published in books about Narnia and is generally considered valid.) (which inaugurated the series in 1950).

The frame story, set in England, features two children ensnared in experimental travel via "the wood between the worlds". Thus, the novel shows Narnia and this world to be only two of many in a multiverse, which changes as some worlds begin and others end. It also explains the origin of foreign elements in Narnia, not only the lamp-post but also the White Witch and a human king and queen.

Lewis began The Magician's Nephew soon after completing The Lion, the Witch and the Wardrobe, spurred by a friend's question about the lamp-post in the middle of nowhere, but he needed more than five years to complete it. The story includes several autobiographical elements and explores a number of themes with general moral and Christian implications, including atonement, original sin, temptation, and the order of nature.

== Plot summary ==
In 1900, two children, Digory and Polly, live in the same London terrace. When exploring a crawl space joining the houses, they find themselves in the study of Digory's Uncle Andrew. Andrew tricks Polly into touching a yellow magic ring, causing her to vanish. He explains to Digory that the rings allow travel between worlds. He blackmails Digory into taking another yellow ring to follow Polly, and two green rings so that they both can return.

Digory is transported to a sleepy wood filled with pools where he reunites with Polly. They surmise that the wood is a "Wood between the Worlds", similar to the attic that links their houses back in England, and that each pool leads to a separate universe. They decide to explore a different world before returning to England, and jump into one of the nearby pools.

They find themselves in a desolate abandoned city of the ancient world of Charn. Inside the ruined palace, they find a bell with a hammer and an inscription inviting the finder to strike the bell. Despite Polly's protests, Digory rings the bell, awakening a witch-queen named Jadis, who, to avoid defeat in battle, deliberately killed every living thing in Charn by speaking the "Deplorable Word" before placing herself in an enchanted sleep that would end on the ringing of the bell.

The children attempt to flee, but Jadis follows them back to England by clinging to them as they clutch their rings. In England, she orders Uncle Andrew to fetch her a "chariot" – a hansom cab – so she can conquer Earth. She robs a jeweller's shop and returns to Kirke house pursued by police. Jadis tears an iron rod from a nearby lamp-post, using it to fight off police and onlookers when they mock her.

Polly and Digory grab Jadis and put on their rings to take her out of their world – accidentally bringing Uncle Andrew, Frank the cab-driver, and Frank's horse Strawberry, who were all touching each other when the children grabbed their rings. In the Wood between the Worlds, Strawberry, when attempting to drink from one of the ponds, accidentally brings everyone into a void. At first, Digory believes it to be Charn, but Jadis recognises it as a world not yet created. They witness the lion Aslan bringing stars, plants, and animals into existence as he creates the new world, Narnia. A terrified Jadis tries to kill Aslan with the iron rod, but it rebounds harmlessly off him, and in the creative soil of the new world it sprouts into a growing lamp-post.

Aslan gives some animals the power of speech. Frank the cabby and his wife Helen are crowned King and Queen of Narnia. Aslan confronts Digory with his responsibility for waking Jadis and for bringing her into Narnia, and tells Digory he must atone by helping to protect the new land of Narnia from her evil. Aslan transforms Strawberry into a winged horse, and Digory and Polly fly on him to a distant garden. Digory's task is to take an apple from a tree in this garden to plant in Narnia. At the garden Digory finds a sign warning not to steal the fruit.

Digory encounters Jadis in the garden, where she eats one of the apples to become immortal. She first tempts Digory to eat an apple himself, and then to take one back to Earth to heal his dying mother. Digory resists and Jadis departs for the north. Digory returns to Narnia and plants the apple, which grows into a mature tree as Aslan explains that anyone who steals the fruit for themselves will get their heart's desire, but in a form that renders it disagreeable: Jadis is now immortal, but eternally miserable. Moreover, the new tree will protect Narnia from Jadis for centuries to come. Aslan consents for Digory to take an apple from the new tree for his mother and returns Digory, Polly, and Uncle Andrew to England.

Digory's apple restores his mother's health, and he and Polly remain lifelong friends. Uncle Andrew reforms and gives up magic. Digory plants the apple's core with Uncle Andrew's rings in the back yard of his aunt's home in London, and it grows into a large tree. Soon afterwards, Digory's family inherits a mansion in the country, and many years later the apple tree blows down in a storm. Digory, now a professor, has its wood made into a wardrobe, setting up the events in The Lion, the Witch and the Wardrobe.

== Principal characters ==
- Digory Kirke: A boy who becomes the Professor in The Lion, the Witch and the Wardrobe
- Polly Plummer: Digory's friend who lives next door
- Mabel Kirke: Digory's mother
- Andrew Ketterley: Digory's uncle, a minor magician
- Letitia Ketterley: Uncle Andrew's sister, referred to in the book as "Aunt Letty"
- Jadis: Empress of Charn, who becomes the White Witch appearing in The Lion, the Witch and the Wardrobe
- Aslan: The Lion who creates Narnia and kills Jadis in The Lion, the Witch and the Wardrobe
- King Frank: A cabby who becomes the first king of Narnia and ancestor of the kings of Archenland
- Queen Helen: The wife of King Frank, the first queen of Narnia, and the ancestress of the Archenlanders
- Fledge: The winged horse, formerly the cab-horse Strawberry, who carries Polly and Digory to the mountain garden

== Writing ==
Lewis had originally intended only to write the one Narnia novel, The Lion, the Witch and the Wardrobe. However, when Roger Lancelyn Green asked him how a lamp-post came to be standing in the midst of Narnian woodland, Lewis was intrigued enough by the question to attempt to find an answer by writing The Magician's Nephew, which features a younger version of Professor Kirke from the first novel.

The Magician's Nephew seems to have been the most challenging Narnia novel for Lewis to write. While the other six Chronicles of Narnia books were written between 1948 and 1953, The Magician's Nephew was written over a five-year period between 1949 and 1954. He started in the summer of 1949 after finishing The Lion, the Witch and the Wardrobe, but came to a halt after producing 26 pages of manuscript and did not resume work until two years later. This may be as a result of the autobiographical aspects of the novel, as it reflects a number of incidents and parallels very close to his own experiences.

He returned to The Magician's Nephew late in 1950, after completing The Silver Chair. He managed to finish close to three-quarters of the novel, and then stopped work once again after Roger Green, to whom Lewis showed all his writing at the time, suggested there was a structural problem in the story. Finally he returned to the novel in 1953, after finishing The Last Battle in the spring of that year and completed early in 1954.

Lewis originally titled the novel "Polly and Digory"; his publisher changed it to The Magician's Nephew. This book is dedicated to "the Kilmer family".

=== The Lefay Fragment ===
The original opening of the novel differs greatly from the published version, and was abandoned by Lewis. It is now known as 'The Lefay Fragment', and is named after Mrs Lefay, Digory's fairy godmother, who is mentioned in the final version as Uncle Andrew's godmother, a less benevolent user of magic, who bequeathed him the box of dust used to create the magic rings.

In the Lefay Fragment, Digory is born with the ability to speak to (and understand) trees and animals; the distinction between Talking and non-Talking Beasts which was to become such a characteristic feature of the Narnian world is absent. Digory lives with an Aunt Gertrude, a former school mistress with an officious, bullying nature, who has ended up as a Government minister after a lifetime of belligerent brow-beating of others. Whenever his aunt is absent, Digory finds solace with the animals and trees, including a squirrel named Pattertwig. Polly enters the story as a girl next door who is unable to understand the speech of non-human creatures. She wants to build a raft to explore a stream which leads to an underground world. Digory helps construct the raft, but saws a branch from a tree necessary to complete it, in order not to lose face with Polly. This causes him to lose his supernatural powers of understanding the speech of trees and animals. The following day he is visited by his godmother Mrs Lefay who knows that Digory has lost his abilities and gives him a card with the address of a furniture shop which she instructs him to visit. At this point the fragment ends.

Pattertwig and Aunt Gertrude do not appear in the final version of the novel. Pattertwig does, however, appear as a Narnian creature in Prince Caspian, and Aunt Gertrude's career path is retraced by the Head of Experiment House in The Silver Chair.

==== Authenticity ====
Some doubt has been cast on the authenticity of the Lefay Fragment, as the handwriting in the manuscript differs in some ways from Lewis's usual style, and the writing is not of a similar calibre to his other work. Also in August 1963 Lewis had given instructions to Douglas Gresham to destroy all his unfinished or incomplete fragments of manuscript when his rooms at Magdalene College, Cambridge were being cleaned out, following his resignation from the college early in the month.

=== Autobiographical elements ===
A number of aspects of The Magician's Nephew are parallels with Lewis's own life. Both Digory and Lewis were children in the early 1900s, both wanted a pony, and both faced the death of their mothers in childhood. Digory is separated from his father, who is in India, and misses him. Lewis was educated in England after his mother's death, while his father remained in Ireland. He also had a brother in India. Both Lewis and Digory were voracious readers as children, and both are better with books than with numbers. Digory (and Polly) struggle with sums when trying to work out how far they must travel along the attic space to explore an abandoned house, Lewis failed the mathematics entrance exam for Oxford University. Lewis remembered rainy summer days from his youth and Digory is faced with the same woe in the novel. Additionally Digory becomes a professor when he grows up, who takes in evacuated children during World War II.

The character of Andrew Ketterley also closely resembles Robert Capron, a schoolmaster at Wynyard School, which Lewis attended with his brother, whom Lewis suggested during his teens would make a good model for a villain in a future story. Ketterley resembles Capron in his age, appearance, and behaviour.

== Style ==
The Magician's Nephew is written in a lighter tone than other Chronicles of Narnia books, in particular The Last Battle, which was published after. It frequently makes use of humour; this perhaps reflects the sense of looking back at an earlier part of the century with affection, and Lewis as a middle-aged man recalling his childhood during those years. There are a number of humorous references to life in the old days, in particular school life. Humorous exchanges also take place between Narnian animals. Jadis's attempt to conquer London is portrayed as more comical than threatening, and further humour derives from the contrast between the evil empress and Edwardian London and its social mores, and her humiliation of bumbling Andrew Ketterley after discovering he is not as powerful a sorcerer as she is (or was). This recalls the style of Edith Nesbit's children's books. Lewis was fond of these books, which he read in childhood, a number were set in the same period and The Magician's Nephew has some apparent references or homages to them.

== Reading order ==
"I think I agree with your [chronological] order for reading the books more than with your mother's. The series was not planned beforehand as she thinks. When I wrote The Lion I did not know I was going to write any more. Then I wrote P. Caspian as a sequel and still didn't think there would be any more, and when I had done The Voyage I felt quite sure it would be the last, but I found I was wrong. So perhaps it does not matter very much in which order anyone read them. I'm not even sure that all the others were written in the same order in which they were published."

— C. S. Lewis's reply to a letter from Laurence Krieg, an American fan who was having an argument with his mother about the reading order.

The Magician's Nephew was originally published as the sixth book in the Narnia Chronicles. Most reprintings of the novels until the 1980s also reflected the order of original publication. In 1980 HarperCollins published the series ordered by the chronology of the events in the novels. This meant The Magician's Nephew was numbered as the first in the series. HarperCollins, which had previously published editions of the novels outside the United States, also acquired the rights to publish the novels in that country in 1994 and used this sequence in the uniform worldwide edition published in that year.

Laurence Krieg, a young fan, wrote to Lewis, asking him to adjudicate between his views of the correct sequence of reading the novels – according to the sequence of events, with The Magician's Nephew being placed first – and that of his mother, who thought the order of publication was more appropriate. Lewis wrote back, appearing to support the younger Krieg's views, although he did point out that perhaps it would not matter what order they were read in.

Lewis scholars Peter Schakel and Paul Ford support the publishing order. Schakel points out that the narrative of The Magician's Nephew assumes that the reader has already read The Lion, the Witch and the Wardrobe (which was written and published first) and is now being shown its beginnings. Ford writes, "most scholars disagree with this decision and find it the least faithful to Lewis's deepest intentions". From a literary standpoint, Lucy Pevensie's discovery of the wardrobe that opens onto a forest and a mysterious lamp-post creates a sense of suspense about an unknown land she is discovering for the first time. This would be anticlimactic if the reader has already been introduced to Narnia in The Magician's Nephew and already knows the origins of Narnia, the wardrobe, and the lamp-post.

== Charn ==
Charn
- The Chronicles of Narnia location
- First appearance: The Magician's Nephew
- Created by: C. S. Lewis
- Genre: Children's fantasy

In-universe information
- Type: City
- Ruled by: Jadis

Charn is a fictional city appearing in the book. Charn, and the world of which it is the capital city, are the birthplace of Jadis, also known as the White Witch, who later seizes control of Narnia.

When visited briefly by Digory and Polly, the protagonists of the novel, the city is totally deserted, lifeless, and crumbling under a dying sun in a dark blue sky. However, according to Jadis, the sun had been that way for eons, but the sky was likely light blue. Rivers have dried up, and neither weeds nor insects live. All life in the world of Charn had been destroyed by Jadis through an evil magic spell known as the Deplorable Word. In the novel, the city stands as an example of the dead end that can result if a civilization succumbs to evil.

During their visit, Digory wakes Jadis from suspended animation, and she is able to leave the world with them.

=== History ===
According to Jadis, Charn was once the greatest city of her unnamed world, "the wonder of the world, perhaps of all worlds." It was a magnificent civilization ruled by a line of magically adept emperors and empresses, of whom Jadis was the last. However, by the time the protagonists enter, the world has become a cold, lifeless wasteland, and the city is on the brink of collapse.

Magic may have been widely used in Charn; Jadis referred to the common use of magic carpets for transportation. Their use was apparently limited to the nobility, who inherited inborn magical powers. Jadis disdained Andrew Ketterley, Digory's magician uncle, as a petty conjurer without a drop of real magic blood in his veins, saying, "Your kind was made an end of in my world a thousand years ago."

Apparently dragons were also once abundant in Charn and in the service of the royal and noble families.

The Hall of Images displays the regal history of Charn, showcasing lifelike portraits of past rulers who are depicted as tall, beautiful, and powerful figures seated upon their thrones. The sequence of these images, through the expressions on their faces, tells a story of a civilization that was once benevolent but degenerated into a cruel, tyrannical empire. The early Emperors and Empresses of Charn were kind and wise, but over centuries, for unexplained reasons, their lineage devolved into one of malevolence, corruption, evil, and despair, seeing their subjects only as a means to an end. Evidently, their hunger for power was insatiable and they conquered several other realms, as Jadis gloats that "many great kings" attempted to stand against Charn, but were defeated and their names lost to history. Slavery was once common in Charn, as was human sacrifice. The last queen of Charn was Jadis, although the numerous empty thrones after hers suggest a premature end to the dynasty.

As Jadis leads the children through the crumbling palace, she describes the cruelty of Charn and its leaders. She points out dungeons and torture chambers to them and recounts that her great-grandfather once invited seven hundred nobles to a banquet and slaughtered them all, "before they had drunk their fill," for "they had rebellious thoughts."

When the children finally see the full extent of the city from the balcony of the royal palace, it extends as far as the eye can see in any direction, as if covering the entire world. It is described as being full of pyramids, bridges, palaces, and towers, with a great river that had long since turned to dust. Jadis recalls viewing the city while it was full of life: "It is silent now. But I have stood here when the whole air was full of the noises of Charn; the trampling of feet, the creaking of wheels, the cracking of the whips and the groaning of slaves, the thunder of chariots, and the sacrificial drums beating in the temples. I have stood here (but that was near the end) when the roar of battle went up from every street and the river of Charn ran red."

=== Destruction of Charn ===
Jadis was responsible for the eradication of all life on Charn but blamed the destruction on her sister. Jadis and her sister fought a civil war for the throne, which Jadis eventually lost. She claimed she had offered to spare her sister's life if she surrendered, so the resulting destruction was the unnamed sister's fault. Jadis obliterated her kingdom and all its people rather than relinquishing her power over them.

According to Jadis's own account, her sister had started a long and murderous civil war. There was a solemn oath between her and the unnamed sister that neither side would use magic, a pact broken by the sister, who gained the advantage as a result. Jadis recounts that during the civil war, she "poured out the blood of her armies like water," but was eventually defeated. In the final battle, which was fought in the city itself over three days, the sister defeated the last of Jadis' forces.

Within the ruling family of Charn, there was knowledge of an evil spell, the Deplorable Word, which would destroy all life except the one who spoke it, though the word itself was a mystery. Although her ancestors had bound themselves and their descendants with oaths never to seek knowledge of this spell, Jadis had sought it out and learned the word "in a secret place and paid a terrible price to learn it." Her sister knew Jadis had discovered the Deplorable Word but did not think Jadis would use it. Facing defeat, Jadis spoke the Deplorable Word, which annihilated all life under the sun apart from herself.

After this, she put herself into an enchanted sleep in the Hall of Images. During her suspended animation, all water in Charn dried up and the once-magnificent city crumbled into ruin.

=== Waking of Jadis ===
The spell that bound Jadis was broken by Digory Kirke. He and Polly Plummer had arrived on Charn via the Wood between the Worlds, and they had explored the deserted royal palace. In the room where Jadis slumbered with life-sized images of her royal ancestors, Kirke succumbed to temptation after having read a verse:

Make your choice, adventurous Stranger;
Strike the bell and bide the danger,
Or wonder, till it drives you mad,
What would have followed if you had.

Charn's star is described as red, large, and cold. When Digory asks Jadis about the star's appearance, she asks him about his world's Sun. When informed that the Sun is yellow, brighter, smaller, and "gives off a good deal more heat," she remarks with sudden interest, "Ah, so yours is a younger world."

Charn and the realm in which it resided ceased to exist entirely after Jadis and the children left. Later, when Aslan and the children are in the Wood between the Worlds, Aslan shows them that the puddle leading to Charn is dried up, as the empty world has been destroyed. Jadis entered Narnia with the humans from Earth, and 900 years later appears as the White Witch in The Lion, the Witch and the Wardrobe, ruling that land for 100 years until Aslan returned and defeated her with the aid of the four Pevensie children.

=== Commentary ===
The name "Charn" suggests "charnel house," a repository for human skeletal remains. The hall of the figures of the rulers of Charn, inspired by the underground grotto of mummies in King Solomon's Mines, shows a progression illustrating the decline and fall of the city and its world, reflecting a view of history described by G. K. Chesterton. The "deplorable word" is most likely a metaphor for weapons of mass destruction, which many feared would bring about the destruction of the world at the time when the novel was written.

In the last chapter of the book, Polly asks Aslan if humanity has yet grown as corrupt as Charn, to which he replies:

"Not yet. But you are growing more like it. It is not certain that some wicked one of your race will not find out a secret as evil as the Deplorable Word and use it to destroy all living things. And soon, very soon, before you are an old man and an old woman, great nations in your world will be ruled by tyrants who care no more for joy and justice and mercy than the Empress Jadis. Let your world beware. That is the warning."

— Lewis, C. S. (1955). The Magician's Nephew. London: Bodley Head.

In this paragraph, Lewis may have been alluding to the tyranny, despotism, and corruption which had been spreading abroad. Aslan's statement that before the protagonists grow old, their world, which is our world, "will be ruled by tyrants who care no more for joy and justice and mercy than Empress Jadis", might be a reference to World War I and World War II. This is further suggested by the fact that The Lion, the Witch and the Wardrobe, which is set during World War II, portrays Digory as the elderly Professor Kirke.

== Themes and interpretations ==
=== Parallels with the Book of Genesis ===
Lewis suggested that he did not directly intend to write his Narnia stories as Christian tales, but that these aspects appeared subconsciously as he wrote, although the books did become Christian as they progressed. He thought that the tales were not direct representations or allegory, but that they might evoke or remind readers of Biblical stories. In The Lion, the Witch and the Wardrobe, Aslan is a Christ-like figure who suffers a death of atonement and returns to life in a similar way to Christ's crucifixion and resurrection. The Magician's Nephew has similar biblical allusions, reflecting aspects of the Book of Genesis such as the creation, original sin and temptation.

Parallels with events in the Book of Genesis include the forbidden fruit represented by an Apple of Life. Jadis tempts Digory to eat one of the forbidden apples in the garden, as the serpent tempts Eve into eating a forbidden fruit in the Garden of Eden; unlike Eve however, Digory rejects the offer. (Lewis's Perelandra also features a re-enactment of the same Biblical story, which in that book also ends with the tempter foiled and the fall avoided.)

While the creation of Narnia closely echoes the creation of the Earth in the Book of Genesis, there are a number of important differences. Human beings are not created in Narnia by Aslan, they are brought into Narnia from our own world. Unlike Genesis, where souls are given only to human beings, animals and half-human half-animal creatures such as Fauns and Satyrs and even trees and watercourses are given souls and the power of rational thought and speech. This appears to suggest Lewis combined his Christian outlook with his fondness for nature, myths and fairy tales.

Parallels may also be found in Lewis's other writings. Jadis's references to "reasons of State", and her claim to own the people of Charn and to be beyond morality, represent the eclipse of the medieval Christian belief in natural law by the political concept of sovereignty, as embodied first in royal absolutism and then in modern dictatorships. Uncle Andrew represents the Faustian element in the origins of modern science.

=== The Holy Spirit and the breath of life ===
On a number of occasions in the Chronicles of Narnia, Aslan uses his breath to give strength to characters, demonstrating his benevolent power of bringing life. He specifically does so in The Magician's Nephew when a "long warm breath" gives life to Narnia. Lewis used the symbol of breath to represent the Holy Spirit, also known as the Holy Ghost. Both spirit and ghost are translations of the word for breath in Hebrew and Greek. The flash from the stars when the Narnian animals are given the ability to talk also most probably represents the Holy Spirit or "breath of life" of Genesis chapter 2, as well as (possibly) the scholastic concept of the divine active intellect that inspires human beings with rationality. (Note: In the view of Avicenna and Maimonides, intellectual inspiration descends through ten angelic emanations, of which the first nine are the intelligences of the heavenly spheres and the tenth is the Active Intellect.)

=== Nature and a natural order ===
The Magician's Nephew suggests two opposing approaches to nature, a good approach associated with Aslan as creator and an evil approach associated with human deviation from divine intentions and the harmony of a natural order. On the one hand there is the beauty of Aslan's creation of Narnia, which is suggested as having a natural order by the use of musical harmony to bring landscapes and living things into being. There is also a distinct order to the process of creation, from earth to plants to animal, which evokes the concept of The Great Chain of Being. Lewis himself was a strong believer in the intrinsic value of nature for itself, rather than as a resource to be exploited. This is perhaps reflected in how Aslan also gives speech to spiritual aspects of nature, such as naiads in the water and dryads in the trees. Andrew Ketterley and Jadis represent an opposite, evil approach of bending the forces of nature to human will for their own gain. They see nature solely as a resource to use for their plans and thus disturb and destroy the natural order.

=== Weapons of mass destruction: the Deplorable Word ===
The Deplorable Word is a fictional magical curse which ends all life on a world except that of the one who speaks it.

In The Magician's Nephew, the children who are the central characters, Digory Kirke and Polly Plummer, come to a lifeless world called Charn. In an ancient, ruined building they awaken a queen called Jadis. She tells them of a worldwide civil war she fought against her sister. All of Jadis's armies were defeated, having been made to fight to the death of the last soldier, and her sister claimed victory. Then Jadis spoke the horrible curse which her sister knew she had discovered but did not think she would use. In speaking the Deplorable Word, Jadis killed every living thing in her world, except herself, to avoid losing the war to her sister.

The children are shocked by this account, but Jadis has no regrets or remorse. The past rulers of her race, who evidently had not always been evil, knew of the Deplorable Word's existence but not the word itself, and had vowed that none of them, nor their descendants, would seek to discover it. Jadis said she had “learned it in a secret place and paid a terrible price to learn it".

Lewis did not say what the word was, or the price paid to learn it.

The book was written in 1955 during the Cold War, ten years after the atomic bombings of Hiroshima and Nagasaki, and three years after the first thermonuclear weapon was detonated. Lewis does not explicitly link the Deplorable Word to any specific weapon of mass destruction, but he alludes to the power of humanity to destroy life. Near the end of the story Lewis has the lion Aslan say to the central characters from the Victorian era:

It is not certain that some wicked one of your race will not find out a secret as evil as the Deplorable Word and use it to destroy all living things. And soon, very soon, before you are an old man and an old woman, great nations of your world will be ruled by tyrants who care no more for joy and justice and mercy than the Empress Jadis. Let your world beware. That is the warning.

Several writers have interpreted this warning as an allusion to nuclear weapons. Katherine Langrish wrote, "the Deplorable Word is an unmistakable metaphor for the atom bomb."

== Influences ==
=== John Milton's Paradise Lost ===
The sacred Garden in the west of the Narnian world is surrounded by a "high wall of green turf" with branches of trees overhanging it, and "high gates of gold, fast shut, facing due east", which must be the only entrance because the travellers "walked nearly all the way round it" before they found them. In all these points Lewis echoes John Milton's description of Eden in Paradise Lost:

The verdurous wall of Paradise up sprung...

And higher than that Wall a circling row
Of goodliest trees loaden with fairest fruit,
Blossoms and fruits at once of golden hue,
Appeerd, with gay enameld colours mixt...

One gate there only was, and that look'd east
On th' other side...

Jadis takes on echoes of Satan from the same work: she climbs over the wall of the Garden in contempt of the command to enter only by the gate, and proceeds to tempt Digory as Satan tempted Eve, with lies and half-truths.

Some details of the creation of Narnia, such as the emergence of animals from the ground, and the way they shake earth from their bodies are also similar to passages in Paradise Lost, and may also have been inspired by descriptions of the processes of nature in the seventh book of Edmund Spenser's The Faerie Queene.

=== The Garden of the Hesperides ===
Four years before the publication of the first Narnia book, Lewis had written as follows on the experience of reading really good poetry for the first time:

...I did not in the least feel that I was getting in more quantity or better quality a pleasure I had already known. It was more as if a cupboard which one had hitherto valued as a place for hanging coats proved one day, when you opened the door, to lead to the garden of the Hesperides...

The element of the cupboard leading to a new world Lewis proceeded to use in The Lion, the Witch and the Wardrobe, but the snowy Narnia of that book is quite unlike the balmy Garden of the Hesperides, most of whose major mythological features appear as attributes of the sacred Garden in The Magician's Nephew where it differs from the Biblical or Miltonian Eden. It is set in the far West of the world; it has a watchful guardian; a hero (Digory) is sent, like Hercules, to fetch an apple from it; a female villain (Jadis) steals another of the apples, like Eris. Since the eponymous Hesperides were daughters of Hesperus, the god of the planet Venus in the evening, advocates of the planetary theory adduce this as evidence for a special association between The Magician's Nephew and Venus.

=== Edith Nesbit ===
Lewis read Edith Nesbit's children's books as a child and was extremely fond of them. The Magician's Nephew refers to these books in the opening of the novel as though their events were true, mentioning the setting of the piece as being when "Mr. Sherlock Holmes was still living in Baker Street and the Bastables were looking for treasure in the Lewisham Road". The Bastables were children who appeared in a number of Edith Nesbit's stories. In addition to being set in the same period and location as several of Nesbit's stories, The Magician's Nephew also has some similarities with Nesbit's The Story of the Amulet (1906). This novel focuses on four children living in London who discover a magic amulet. Their father is away and their mother is ill, as is the case with Digory. They also manage to transport the queen of ancient Babylon to London and she is the cause of a riot; a very similar event takes place in The Magician's Nephew when Polly and Digory transport Queen Jadis to London and she also causes a similar disturbance.

=== J. R. R. Tolkien ===
The creation of Narnia may also have been influenced by his close friend J. R. R. Tolkien's The Silmarillion, which also contains a creation scene driven by the effect of music.

=== Morgan Le Fay and Pandora's Box ===
Lewis greatly enjoyed stories of Arthurian legend and wrote poetry about this world. Mrs Lefay visits Digory in The Lefay Fragment, and becomes Andrew Ketterley's nefarious godmother in the finished novel. She gives Ketterley a box from Atlantis containing the dust from which he constructs the rings Digory and Polly use to travel between worlds. Both Lefays are allusions to Morgan Le Fay, a powerful sorceress in a number of versions of King Arthur's tales, who is often portrayed as evil. The box itself is also evocative of Pandora's box from Greek myth, which also contained dangerous secrets.

=== The Atlantis legend ===
The box of dust enabling travel between worlds originated in Atlantis. Both Lewis and Tolkien were fascinated by the Atlantis legend. The degeneration of Charn's rulers, Jadis's ancestors, from the early kind and wise to the later cruel and arrogant is reminiscent of the similar degeneration in Tolkien's Númenor, the fabled island kingdom that finally sank under the waves due to the sinfulness of its latter inhabitants. The world of Charn was destroyed when Jadis spoke The Deplorable Word, a form of knowledge ancient Charnian scholars feared for its destructive potential. A number of commentators believed Lewis was referring to the use of the atomic bomb, used less than a decade earlier. It is perhaps more likely that Lewis was echoing the mythical destruction of Atlantis by the forces of evil and arrogance. As noted by Alice Ward, the comparison with nuclear arms is made explicit in Aslan's last warning: "You [Earth] are growing more like it [Charn]. It is not certain that some wicked one of your race will not find out a secret as evil as The Deplorable Word and use it to destroy all living things".

== Adaptations ==
=== Theatrical ===
Aurand Harris was a well-known American playwright for children, whose works are among the most performed in that medium. He wrote 36 plays for children including an adaption of The Magician's Nephew. The play was first performed on 26 May 1984 by the Department of Drama, University of Texas, Austin and staged at the B. Iden Payne Theatre. A musical score by William Penn was written for use with productions of the play.

Erina Caradus wrote a playscript for The Magician's Nephew that was performed in Dunedin, New Zealand in 2005. (Note: The homepage now promotes the last of four Narnia theatrical productions, The Voyage of the Dawn Treader (2010). Information about the four numbers varies.)

=== Film ===
An agreement among representatives of 20th Century Fox, Walden, and the C. S. Lewis Company determined that The Magician's Nephew would be the basis for the next film following the release of the 2010 film The Voyage of the Dawn Treader. However, in October 2011, Douglas Gresham confirmed that Walden Media's contract with the C. S. Lewis estate had expired.

On 1 October 2013, the C.S. Lewis Company announced that they had entered into an agreement with The Mark Gordon Company to jointly develop and produce The Silver Chair, ultimately deciding to continue releasing the films to mirror the novel series' publication order.

In October 2018, Netflix announced an agreement with the C. S. Lewis Company. Netflix would develop and produce a new series adaptation of The Chronicles of Narnia. Mark Gordon, Douglas Gresham, and Vincent Sieber are attached as producers for the series. The film, directed by Greta Gerwig, is scheduled for release in theaters on 12 February 2027, before streaming on Netflix from 2 April 2027.

=== Television ===
In 2003, the BBC produced a 10-part version read by Jane Lapotaire and signed by Jean St Clair wearing different Narnia-like clothes in British Sign Language, for the TV series Hands Up! which was first broadcast on the 16 January 2003. Jean signed in front of various high quality illustrations representing parts of the novel. It was later repeated on CBBC on the 3 December 2007, and BBC Two on the 16 September 2008.

=== Radio ===
A BBC Radio 4 adaptation exists. Focus on the Family also made an adaptation of this book with a full cast, sound editing, and music. Both productions adapted all seven books.

=== Manga ===
A HarperCollins Japan manga adaptation, Chronicles Of Narnia: The Magician's Nephew: I Opened the Wrong Door! (Japanese: ナルニア国物語: 魔術師のおい: 間違ったドアを開けた!, Hepburn: Narnia Koku Monogatari: Majutsushi no Oi: Machigatta Doa o Aketa!), began publication in 2018, before concluding in 2020 after two volumes.

== Critical reception ==
T.M. Wagner of SF Reviews said "The Magician's Nephew may not be the best of the Narnia novels, but it's a brisk and funny tale certain to delight its intended young audience", saying that it may not satisfy readers in their teenage years and older.

Jandy's Reading Room reviewed the book, saying that although they feel it is the weakest of the series, they would still recommend it. They say it "gives a wonderful picture of the beginning of a new world, in the manner of the Creation."
