= Novosti (TV program) =

- Genre: News; Current affairs
- Created by: Channel One
- Country of origin: Russia
- Original language: Russian

Production
- Production locations: Ostankino Technical Center, Moscow, Russia
- Camera setup: Multi-camera

Original release
- Network: Soviet Programme One (1968-1991); 1st channel Ostankino (1991-1994) Channel One (1995-present)
- Release: 14 February 1956 - present

Related
- Vremya, Vesti, Segodnya, Sobytia, Izvestia

Novosti (Russian: Новости), literally News is an information program that has been broadcast since 14 February 1956 on Channel One (in 1956-1967 and in 1985-1991 - on Channel One of the Central Television of the USSR, in 1992-1995 on 1st channel Ostankino, in 1995-2002 - on ORT). It is an overview of information for the past part of the day. Since 1996, it has been produced by the Information Programs Directorate of JSC Channel One.

== History ==
News on the "first button" began to be broadcast from 14 February 1956 to 31 December 1967 and from 10 February 1985. From 1 January 1990 to 31 December 1991, the program was called Television News Service. From 28 August until the end of 1991 at 21:00, the program was called "TV Inform".

=== TV Inform/News Ostankino (1991-1992) ===
After the closure of the program "Vremya" and "TSN" on 28 August 1991, a new information program "TV Inform" appeared.

In November 1991, ITA was created on the basis of TSN, while the previous information service - the Studio of Information Programs of Television - was abolished, and the production of the "News" program was transferred to ITA, while the program acquired its intro only on 1 January 1992. The morning newscasts of Ostankino News were hosted by Boris Kostenko, Pavel Ogorodnikov, Marina Nazarova, the evening newscasts at 9:00 pm since October 1991 were hosted by Tatyana Komarova, Sergey Medvedev, Irina Mishina, Pavel Kasparov, the evening newscasts at 6:00 pm and the night newscasts were hosted by Mikhail Osokin, Dmitry Kiselyov and Tatyana Mitkova. The abbreviation "ITA" was mentioned on Russian television back in late 1991 in the program "TV Inform".

With the collapse of the Soviet Union in December 1991, Ostankino News began to be broadcast, which was also produced by ITA. "Ostankino News" began to be broadcast at 6:00, 9:00, 12:00 (all with a duration of 20 minutes), 15:00 (25 minutes), 18:30 (25 minutes), 21:00 (40 minutes) and 0:00 (25 minutes).

In February 1992, Sergey Dorenko (previously hosted the night editions of "Vesti") moved to the channel, becoming the host of the evening news instead of Pavel Kasparov. In 1993, Sergey Dorenko moved to Moscow Independent Broadcasting Corporation, where he headed the information service. Nelly Petkova (journalist), Mikhail Svetlichny and Igor Vykhukholev became morning hosts.

=== ITA News (1992-1996) ===
Since 28 July 1992, 1st channel Ostankino began broadcasting the news program"ITA News instead of the news program "Ostankino News", which usually aired without the channel's logo (instead, the "ITA" logo was displayed in the lower right corner of the stories). It had the headings "Economic News", "Sports News", "Weather" and others.

On 18 September 1993, some of the journalists of this program - hosts Tatyana Mitkova and Mikhail Osokin, correspondents Vladimir Luskanov, Vladimir Lensky, Irina Zaitseva, Alexander Gerasimov, Mikhail Svetlichny, Alexander Zarayelyan, Boris Koltsov, Александр Хабаров и Andrei Cherkasov, Alexander Khabarov and Andrei Cherkasov due to disagreements with the chairman of the Russian State Television and Radio Broadcasting Company Ostankino, Vyacheslav Bragin, left "Novosti" and formed the NTV Information Service, where they began to produce the information program "Today", which began to be broadcast on Channel 5, and later on NTV.

In December 1993, Irina Mishina was removed from presenting the news. Sergei Alekseev became the host of the weekly information and analytical program "Sunday".

Nelli Petkova replaced Irina Mishina as the host of the evening news, and Alexander Ilyichev, Vladimir Kalinovsky, and Anna Prokhorova became the hosts of the morning news.

In January 1994, Sergei Medvedev became the host of the weekly information and analytical program "Novosti Plus" (aired at 9:00 PM on Saturdays until November 1994), and Igor Vykhukholev became the host of the evening news. In mid-1994, Pavel Ogorodnikov was appointed a correspondent, and Boris Kostenko began hosting his program in his place, but at the end of 1994, he stopped hosting the news. Sergei Shatunov, Alexander Panov, Alexander Goryanov, and Sergei Lomakin became the hosts of the programs.

From 28 February 1994, the 6:00 AM news program was cancelled. Since 4 July 1994, due to the introduction of a daytime break on the Ostankino TV channel from 11:20 to 16:00, the broadcast time of news releases was changed. The 9:00 and 12:00 releases began to be broadcast an hour earlier (at 8:00 and 11:00, respectively), and the 15:00 release was broadcast an hour later, at 16:00.

Since July 1994, the hosts of the morning and daytime releases are Alexandra Buratayeva, Irina Paley, Maria Volkova and Natalia Romanova.

From 1 August 1994 to 31 March 1995, ITA Novosti also went on air in the GMS programming block, which now occupied part of the daytime and nighttime airtime of 1st channel Ostankino. In this block, news releases were aired in a shortened format - they had an 8-minute running time and were aired at the 52nd minute of every hour (from 11:52 to 14:52 and from 1:52 to 3:52); some of the news, due to the short running time, were read by the host without showing video clips (if there was a "Cultural News" section within the release, the release was aired without them at all). From 3 October 1994, this format was also introduced in the "main" broadcast of the Ostankino channel - news began to be aired every hour from 7:52 to 3:52 Moscow time (except for 19:52, 20:52, 21:52, 22:52 and 0:52; the 7:52 release for Central Russia was aired within the Teleutro program under the "Day Chronicle" banner). From 16 December 1994, the 9:00 PM newscasts were called "Vremya, as they had been before 1991.

From 1 April 1995, the program began to be produced jointly by ITA and ORT and aired on weekdays in three-hour increments, as before 1994 (the first broadcast at 6:00 AM, the last broadcast on a floating schedule from 11:30 PM to 12:45 AM), and on weekends at 9:00 AM, 3:00 PM, and 6:00 PM. From 10 April to 30 September 1995, a shortened version of Vremya was aired every day (including Sunday) at 6:00 PM instead of the regular newscast. All broadcasts were 20-25 minutes long, as they had been before October 1994.

Since 2 October 1995, the night edition has been broadcast in the format of a final review of the day's events, lasting about 10 minutes. It replaced Sergei Dorenko's analytical program "Versii" (Versions), which was closed on ORT, in the broadcasting schedule. The format of this "News" edition has changed several times since then: in particular, since 11 March 1996, it was broadcast without a host who would voice a summary of the day's events off-camera.

At the end of 1995, Nelly Petkova became the host of the weekly information and analytical program "Sunday".

In January 1996, on the initiative of the first deputy general director of ORT information programs Ksenia Ponomareva, a reform of the television company's news broadcasting was launched. The main goal was to make ORT news releases the same as NTV (the television company's staff partly consisted of former ITA employees), but oriented not so much toward prepared and informed viewers, but toward a wider audience.

=== ORT/First Channel News (since 1996) ===
In March 1996, the ORT Information Programs Directorate was created on the basis of ITA, which received the right to produce all news broadcasts on the channel. Since the spring of 1996, news on the channel was broadcast without the ITA logo as regular ORT news, and soon this logo also disappeared from the branded reporter microphones (instead, the ochre-colored ORT logo of 1995-1996 began to be displayed on the cubes). Until the early 2000s, news broadcasts were formed as follows: 70% of all news reports were determined by the Interfax agency, 20% of the news was chosen by the journalists themselves, and the remaining 10% by the channel's managers. Some stories could be of an overtly advertising nature. Three years after Konstantin Ernst took over as ORT CEO, an analytical directorate headed by Marat Gelman was created within its structure, publishing weekly "temniks". These temniks included all the news recommended for coverage, subdivided in turn into main, basic and others, with advice on presentation, interpretation and use of certain words, often with the phone numbers of experts that journalists needed to contact for comments.. Most of the news blocks did not do without stories about the trips of the President and the Chairman of the Government of Russia, people close to them. Until the mid-2000s, ORT's own correspondents for the Directorate of Information Programs, working in the post-Soviet space, were appointed from among the citizens of the countries they represented on air, which was due to economic reasons, as well as their high professionalism and ability to navigate the situation. Since 10 May 1996, the Novosti edition at 9:00 on weekends began to be broadcast at 10:00.

In October 1998, the format of the night edition was changed: now it was dedicated to a current topic of the passing day, on which experts or persons involved in the event spoke in synchronicities. A little later, the edition was called "News of the Day" and the identification plates for the place and persons were individually designed. Its hosts were political commentators Pavel Shirov and Anton Vernitsky (every other week). On weekends, thematic late-evening news releases "Sports News" and "Cultural News" were added, reviews of events that had occurred in the world of sports and culture, respectively, consisting of reports from ORT's own correspondents. The hosts of the specialized sports and cultural editions were the channel's specialized commentators Viktor Gusev and Alexander Kazakevich, respectively.

Since 15 March 1999, Mikhail Leontyev's analytical program Odnako (However) began airing instead of Novosti Dnya (Day News), and since 15 June of the same year, after it moved to the Vremya (Time) program's timeslot, the night news broadcast was returned to the air in the previous format of reviewing the day's events. The weekly issues of Novosti Sporty (Sports News) and Novosti Kultury (Culture News) lasted until the summer of 1999.

On 27 September 1999, the timing of the 18:00 news broadcast, which was called Novosti. Evening Edition, was increased to 25 minutes. By analogy with it, the program that aired in the timeslot after midnight was called Novosti. Nochnoy Ekspiysk (Night Edition). In 2000, these two broadcasts were renamed Vecherniye Novosti (Evening News) and Nochniye Novosti (Night News), respectively. The evening editions of the program were hosted by Zhanna Agalakova (she moved from NTV) and Igor Vykhukholev, the morning and afternoon editions were hosted by Igor Gmyza and Olga Kokorekina, and also for a short time from May to September 2001 by Anna Pavlova.

Since 2 October 1999, a 10-minute "News" edition was broadcast on Saturdays and Sundays in the morning at 8:00, which opened ORT's broadcast on weekends. In the fall of 2002, it was moved to 7:00, and in the spring of 2003 (finally) to 6:00. Similarly, the episodes were also broadcast on holidays, with the exception of 1st of January (when the episode was not broadcast at all), and from 2000 to 2002, also on 9 May (then the episode was broadcast at 7:00).

From July to September 2001, the program "Night News" was broadcast at 23:30 and always included the sections "However" and "Sports News". From 24 September 2001, it was renamed "Night "Vremya", and its hosts became Andrei Baturin and Zhanna Agalakova (the latter was later replaced by Pyotr Marchenko). In those years, the program had a more analytical nature and could periodically attract specialists to cover events, who would give their assessments.

Since the autumn of 2001, the morning newscast was hosted by Rustam Suleimankhil (previously a correspondent and host of the "Chronicles of the Day" section of the "Good Morning" program) and Evgeny Agoshkov (previously worked in the international shift of the ORT Information Programs Directorate). The daytime and evening newscasts of the program at that time were presented by Igor Gmyza, Oksana Rostovtseva, Olga Kokorekina and Igor Vykhukholev. Andrey Baturin became the backup host of the information programs (he mainly hosted special editions). From that time on, the program began to be broadcast in a blue-brown light studio, developed by the "Scene" company.

Since 13 July 2002, the 15:00 "News" on weekends began to be broadcast at 14:00, and since September of the same year, the 18:00 release on Sundays was cancelled due to the transfer of the "Vremena" program to this time. Since 26 July 2003, the 14:00 "News" on weekends began to be broadcast at 12:00. Also since 2003, the evening news release on weekdays was increased in duration from the previous 20-25 to 30 minutes.

From 24 March to 20 June 2003, an additional news release was broadcast at 2:00 on weekdays, in which the host presented the main events in the country and the world in one line. Since 30 September 2003, the day of the introduction of round-the-clock broadcasting of Channel One on a permanent basis, it was resumed, but at 3:00, dividing the broadcast feature film into two parts. At the same time, a similar news release was introduced, initially from Monday to Thursday, now from Monday to Friday at 5:00. In 2003-2005, it divided the film into two parts, in 2005-2006 it came out before the First Program, and since 14 August 2006, it began to open the Good Morning program.

In August 2003, Anton Voloshko (previously a correspondent for Channel One) became the host of the morning broadcasts. Since the beginning of 2004, Natalia Tingayeva began hosting the morning broadcasts instead of Rustam Suleimankhil, who was transferred to administrative work. The daytime broadcasts were presented by Zhanna Agalakova, Olga Kokorekina, Igor Vykhukholev and Evgeny Agoshkov. In February 2004, the evening broadcasts returned to their previous length of 20 minutes.

In November 2004, Kirill Kleimyonov was appointed director of the Information Programs Directorate of Channel One. After his arrival, a reform of the entire information service began. During the first months of his work, 40 of the 80 correspondents of the channel's Information Programs Directorate who worked on the program were fired. Among the reasons for the dismissal and large-scale layoffs are the professional incompetence of employees, irregular appearances for work and on air, mediocre quality of the stories shown, and a desire to rejuvenate and renew the workforce. The mediocre quality of news broadcasts was also noted by journalists from some print and online publications shortly before the changes in the management of the newsroom. The appearance of the presenters working on camera also raised questions among television critics: reviewers thought that the people working on the channel's news broadcasts looked like "school teachers or political officers", which distinguished them from the presenters of similar programs on Rossiya and NTV, as well as from the non-news presenters of Channel One of those years. In total, from 2004 to 2006, about 150 people left the Directorate of Information Programs for various reasons, and about the same number came to replace them. In 2006, the number of employees of the Directorate of Information Programs was approximately 700 people. Several correspondent offices in the post-Soviet countries were closed.

On 31 January 2005, due to a change in the evening broadcasting schedule on Channel One, the Evening News on weekdays was shortened from 20 to 10 minutes (in July 2006, the duration was again increased to 17-20 minutes), while sports news was removed from the program (the weather forecast was removed in late 2003 - early 2004). That same year, Igor Vykhukholev was appointed editor-in-chief of the morning and night information broadcasts of Channel One, and Vyacheslav Kriskevich began hosting the evening news instead. Since 12 September 2005, Vsevolod Neroznak has been hosting the morning news instead of Yevgeny Agoshkov, and the 11:40 p.m. newscast, hosted by Tatyana Kalinina and Vsevolod Neroznak, was again called "Night News" and returned to its previous format of a classic review of the day's news.

Since 2006, the morning, afternoon, and evening newscasts have been hosted by Dmitry Borisov, Yulia Pankratova, Maxim Sharafutdinov, and Valeria Korableva. Since 2007, the "Night News" program has been hosted by the channel's former UK correspondent Anatoly Lazarev and Olga Kokorekina, who was later replaced by Natalia Semenikhina.

Since 8 September 2007, the Saturday edition of Vecherniye Novosti was cancelled, and the analytical talk show Vremena with Vladimir Pozner, which had previously aired on Sunday evenings, began to be broadcast instead.

Since 2 March 2008, all news broadcasts from 9:00 to 1:00 have been broadcast from the large studio of the Vremya program, which was previously the Ostankino concert studio, but nothing remains of the hall. The Directorate of Information Programs stopped using studio tapes and completely switched to computer video editing.

In the summer of 2008, the running time of Other News was reduced from half an hour to 20 minutes, from that moment on, from 2 June 2008 to 26 August 2011. Almost all News broadcasts, including the non-political 14-hour news on weekdays, lasted 20 minutes.

Since 6 September 2008, a 15:00 broadcast has been aired on weekends (it was cancelled in 2009, and from 2014 to 2017 it was aired on Saturdays, sometimes on Sundays).

Since the summer of 2010, the broadcast of the "Sports News" blocks has resumed in the daytime (weekends) and nighttime (weekdays) "News". Since 29 August 2011, the block has returned to the "Evening News". This block existed in two versions: with a commentator's voice-over under the picture (in daytime and nighttime broadcasts) and with a presenter in the studio (in the evening news).

Since 1 June 2011, the program has been broadcast in 16:9 format.

Since 29 August 2011, the Evening News has been broadcast with an extended running time — 50 minutes (almost an hour) on weekdays and 15 minutes on Saturdays. The presenters, who replace each other every week, have become uniform for all of the channel's "orbits."

In July 2013, the program saw a partial change in presenters. Instead of Anatoly Lazarev, the daytime news is hosted by Alena Lapshina, instead of Yulia Pankratova, the Evening News is hosted by Anna Pavlova, instead of Anna Pavlova, the Night News is hosted by Yuri Lipatov, instead of Alexei Galatinov and Alena Lapshina, the morning news (for Moscow — the night edition) is now hosted by Maria Vasilyeva and Andrei Levandovsky.

From 7 to 23 February 2014 (during the 2014 Winter Olympics in Sochi), the program was broadcast from the Sochi studio, located near the Fisht Stadium and the Sochi Olympic Park. In the first days of the Games, all news broadcasts were broadcast from Sochi, and later it was also used in live broadcasts and roll calls with the large studio. During the Paralympics, it was included with the Paralympic news.

From 20 May 2014 to 28 January 2018, at the end of each hour (or in the interprogram space), "News of the Hour" was broadcast.

The program "Other News" was closed on 2 June 2014, along with the programs "It's Your Business", "The Truth Is Somewhere Nearby" and "Understand. Forgive".

From 26 August 2014, the program began to be broadcast in HD quality instead of SD. The complete refurbishment of the Information Programs Directorate was completed in December 2014.

Since 24 May 2015, the Sunday edition of "Evening News" at 17:45-18:00 was cancelled.

From 29 August 2016 to 22 February 2017 and from 6 to 10 March 2017, a 10-15 minute-long edition was broadcast from the studio for morning editions on weekdays at 14:00. One week it was hosted by Yuri Lipatov (until December 2016 - former correspondent of the TV channel Ekaterina Berezovskaya), the next by Maxim Sharafutdinov.

On 23 January 2017, in connection with the appearance of the program "First Studio", the workday schedule underwent changes. "Evening News" was divided into two parts. The first part preceded the talk show and lasted 25-30 minutes. After the First Studio, the second part of the Evening News was broadcast at 19:45-19:50, lasting 10-15 minutes. Also, instead of Elena Vinnik, who went on maternity leave, the 18:00 news broadcast was hosted by Valeria Korableva, and Ekaterina Berezovskaya became the host of the daytime broadcasts at 9:00, 10:00, 12:00 and 15:00. At the same time, the Sports News section began to disappear from the program - the last time it was broadcast on the weekend news was on 15 January (commentator - Maria Rumyantseva), on the Evening News - on 17 January (host - Viktor Gusev), on the Night News - on 19 January (commentator - Alexander Lidogoster). After the first reports of the closure of this section appeared, the channel's management announced that this was a temporary decision. As a result, sports news began to be broadcast as a separate block in the "Good Morning" program with a commentator's voice-over, as well as in daytime releases on "Orbits", edited to the morning releases for the Moscow time zone.

Since 22 February 2017, "Evening News" on Fridays or before holidays is not divided into two parts. Since 27 February, the 14:00 release began to be broadcast very rarely, and since 13 March it was finally cancelled.

Since 15 May 2017, the division of the "Evening News" into two parts was cancelled.

Since 28 August 2017, Andrei Ukharev temporarily took over the evening news broadcasts from Dmitry Borisov.

Since 4 September 2017, "Evening News" has been hosted again by Elena Vinnik, who returned from maternity leave, and since 11 September, Valeria Korableva has been hosting daytime news instead of Ekaterina Berezovskaya. Since that time, due to the fact that Dmitry Borisov became the new host of the program "Let Them Talk", "Evening News" has been hosted instead of him by Andrey Ukharev (previously the editor-in-chief of "Evening News" with Elena Vinnik in 2015-2016, host of morning news in 2004-2006). "Night News" is also hosted by Ekaterina Berezovskaya instead of Yuri Lipatov.

Since 4 December 2017, Larisa Medvedskaya has been hosting morning news for the Far East, and Maria Vasilyeva has been hosting news for the European part of Russia.

Since 29 January 2018, "Night News" (the last episode of which was aired on 25 December 2017) along with "Novosti Hura" were officially closed, due to which the work schedule of the main presenters changed. Maxim Sharafutdinov and Ekaterina Berezovskaya (alternating with each other after some time) began hosting morning editions on weekdays at 8:00, 8:30 and 9:00 and on weekends at 10:00 and 12:00 (until 20 October 2018, one of these presenters working on weekend editions also hosted the Saturday edition of "Evening News"). Alena Lapshina and Valeria Korableva remained on weekday editions at 12:00 and 15:00. Elena Vinnik and Andrey Ukharev began hosting "Evening News" only on weekdays. On 30 January, the duration of these broadcasts was also reduced to 25 minutes due to the fact that the program "Vremya Pokazhet" is broadcast from 18:25 to 18:50.

Since 20 February 2018, after returning to the large news studio after its three-month reconstruction, the presenter now not only reads the introductions to the reports while sitting, but also walks around the studio, hosting part of the program while standing (similar to the program "Vremya").

From 17 July to 31 August 2018, the duration of the evening news on weekdays was the same as on weekends - 15 minutes.

Since 27 October 2018, the "Evening News" broadcasts on Saturdays and Sundays have been cancelled.

Due to the transition of Channel One to broadcasting in eleven hourly versions, which occurred on 25 December 2018, there were changes in the schedule and production of the program. Thus, the "News" issues in the "Good Morning" program for the Far East are aired an hour earlier, from 20:00 Moscow time. Also, from 25 December 2018 to 11 October 2019, a separate issue of "Evening News" for the Far East was broadcast at 9:00 Moscow time (18:00 Kamchatka time) from the morning news studio; these issues were hosted by Alena Lapshina and Valeria Korableva.

In late 2018 and early 2019, the hosts of the morning broadcasts for the Far East changed: instead of Andrei Levandovsky and Larisa Medvedskaya, they were hosted by Yulia Gamaeva (previously she worked as the TV channel's news editor, and even earlier she was a host and correspondent on various TV channels in St. Petersburg) and Makar Rudenchik (former Channel One correspondent in Vladivostok), respectively.

Since 24 January 2019, the "News" at 9:00 are divided into two parts by an advertising block, while their duration has become the same as that of the "Evening News" on weekdays - 25 minutes. Since 14 October 2019, "News" at 9:00 are broadcast on zones with an offset from Moscow time from +9 to +5 hours as "Evening News" for the Far East and Eastern Siberia.

Since 9 September 2019, the running time of "Evening News" has increased from 25 to 30-35 minutes, and since 14 January 2020, it has returned to 25 minutes.

Since 16 November 2019, morning newscasts have been aired on Saturdays at 7:00 and 8:00 a.m. (as part of the "Good Morning. Saturday" TV show), with a running time of 7 minutes.

Since 30 March 2020, the running time of "Evening News" has been increased to 35-45 minutes. From 9 to 17 April 2020, a 14:00 newscast was temporarily aired on weekdays, with a running time of 10 minutes.

In 2022, after a long time, evening newscasts and the "Vremya" program were returned on 31 December.

From 4 November 2023 to 8 July 2024, news broadcasts were broadcast from a special studio for the International Exhibition and Forum Russia at VDNKh in Moscow.

On 12 October 2024, the chair under the host of the program "Time" Ekaterina Andreeva broke during a live broadcast. However, the TV presenter stayed on her feet and did not show it, continuing to read the text from the teleprompter.

Since 4 December 2024, the morning news has been broadcast from a large studio, and since 20 May 2025 - from a small studio.
