= Yevgeny Suslov =

Yevgeny Yakovlevich Suslov (Russian: Евгений Яковлевич Суслов; October 10, 1937 – February 1, 2019) was Soviet journalist who was a long-time announcer for Soviet Central Television and an Honored Artist of the RSFSR (1984).

== Biography ==
Suslov was born October 10, 1937, in Moscow. During his school years, he participated in amateur performances and recited poetry well. After graduating, he entered the Bauman Moscow State Technical University but did not graduate. He served his compulsory military service in the Soviet Navy. An engineer by training, In 1962, he won a competitive selection for the announcers' department of Central Television. He then spent the next 30 years in television, working on the program Vremya and many other programs. He was known for his diction, having announced the deaths of Soviet leaders Yuri Andropov and Konstantin Chernenko, the launch of the Soyuz 38 spacecraft as well as military parades and other holiday events. Suslov began his television career when the Ostankino Tower was still being built. He was made an Honored Artist of the RSFSR on August 30, 1984.

After retirement, Suslov lived in Moscow from the mid-1990s. In the final years of his life, Suslov suffered from serious illness and he died at the age of 81 on February 1, 2019, after a battle with rectal cancer. His funeral service took place on February 4 at Yelokhovsky Cathedral. It was attended by friends Alla Danko, Tatyana Sudets and Kaleria Kislova. His body was cremated, and his ashes were buried in the columbarium at the Nikolo-Arkhangelskoye Cemetery.

== Personal life ==
Suslov was married to Alevtina Mikhailovna Suslova (1942–2022), who worked as a model at GUM. He had two daughters, Svetlana and Natalia. He was also not a member of the Communist Party of the Soviet Union.
