= TEFI =

Russian television award

- A TEFI statuette by Ernst Neizvestny.
- Awarded for: Excellence in television
- Country: Russia
- Presented by: Russian Academy of Television
- First award: 1994
- Website: http://www.tefi.ru/

TEFI (Russian: ТЭФИ) is an annual award given in the Russian television industry, presented by the Russian Academy of Television. It has been awarded since 1994. TEFI is presented in various sectors (up to 50 nominations in 2008), such as television shows, notable people in the television industry, journalists, or channels. The winners are awarded the Orpheus statuette created by Ernst Neizvestny. It can be considered the Russian analogue of the Emmy Awards. The 2002 Edition was postponed to 31 January 2003 due to the Moscow theater hostage crisis.

== History of the Award ==
In April 1994, the Academy of Russian Television was established by several influential broadcasting organizations (RTRC "Ostankino", NTV Television Company, and 2x2), effectively replacing television film festivals, the last of which (the 15th) took place in 1993. On 21, the Academy founded the TEFI Award (from "Television EFIr" [Television Broadcast]). Initially, it included three categories for entertainment programs ("Best Television Film," "Best Entertainment Program," "Best Entertainment Program Host"), one for artistic-publicistic programs ("Best Arts Program"), five for news and socio-political programs ("Best News Program," "Best News Anchor," "Best Reporter," "Best Publicistic Program," "Best Publicistic Program Host"), and others for thematic programs ("Best Educational Program," "Best Sports Program," "Best Children's Program").

In 1998, the "Best Television Film" category was split into "Television Fiction Film/Series" and "Television Documentary Film/Series." The "Publicistic Program" category gave rise to "Talk Show," and "Sports Program" was divided into "Sports Commentator." New categories included "Directing," "Cinematography," and "Producing."

In 2000, "Television Fiction Film/Series" was split into "Television Fiction Film" and "Television Fiction Series." The "Entertainment Program" category became "Television Game" and "Comedy Program," while "Journalistic Investigation" and "Interviewer" were introduced as separate categories. The "Screenwriter" category was added.

The 2002 TEFI Awards were originally scheduled for October 2002 but postponed to January 2003 due to the tragic events in Moscow from October 23–26, 2002.

In 2003, new categories were introduced: "Best Actor in a Television Film/Series," "Best Actress in a Television Film/Series," "Production Design," and "Sound Design." The "Screenwriter," "Directing," and "Cinematography" categories were divided into subcategories for films/series and thematic programs.

In 2004, the "Screenwriter," "Directing," and "Cinematography" categories for films/series were further split into fiction and documentary subcategories. The "History Program" category was separated from "Science Program."

In 2007, Gazprom-Media (owner of NTV and TNT) withdrew from the competition.

In 2008, VGTRK (channels "Rossiya," "Kultura," "Sport," and "Vesti") also withdrew. That year, "Sitcom" emerged as a separate category from "Television Fiction Series," while "Producer," "Production Design," and "Sound Design" were divided into subcategories for films/series and thematic programs.

Following the withdrawal of several major TV channels, Vladimir Pozner resigned as president of the Academy of Russian Television, succeeded by Mikhail Shvydkoy.

In 2011, the category "Television Fiction Series" was split into "Television Fiction Series — TV Novel/Telenovela." The "Music Program" category was divided into "Music Program: Classical" and "Music Program: Popular Music," while "Television Game" was split into "Television Game: Intellectual Competition" and "Television Game: Sports Competition."

In 2013, VGTRK withdrew from the Academy of Russian Television, halting its funding and barring its regional channels from participating in TEFI competitions. Subsequently, Channel One Russia announced it would not nominate programs for "TEFI—2013" due to the "absence of major competitors". Mikhail Shvydkoy also resigned as president of the Academy.

On 23, the Board of Trustees of the Academy of Russian Television decided to suspend the TEFI competition until new rules and regulations could be established.

In December 2013, the Board elected Alexander Akopov as the Academy’s new president and approved the transfer of intellectual property rights for the "TEFI" brand, the "National Television Award TEFI," and the TEFI statuette to the newly formed "Committee of Industrial Television Awards" (headed by Pavel Korchagin), established on November 15, 2013. The transfer was finalized on April 3, 2014.

On 24, the national TEFI competition resumed, accepting entries for "TEFI—2014." Categories were renamed ("Daytime Broadcast" and "Evening Prime") with 12 nominations each. Remaining nominations included "Television Film/Series" (for films, miniseries, serial dramas, telenovelas, and sitcoms) and acting awards. Voting rules were revised: juries included 20 representatives from each founding organization (e.g., Channel One, VGTRK, Gazprom-Media, STS Media, and National Media Group).

On 11, leadership changes occurred: Mikhail Shvydkoy became Chairman of the Board, and Maya Kobakhidze was appointed General Director.

In 2016, under "Daytime Broadcast," "Telenovela" and "Sitcom" merged into "Daytime Television Series." The "Evening Prime" category "Television Film/Series" (retaining films, miniseries, serial dramas, and telenovelas) spawned "Television Multi-Episode Comedy/Sitcom." New categories included "Director of a Television Film/Series," while "Entertainment Program" split into "Humorous Program/Show."

The "TEFI—2017" ceremony, initially scheduled for June 27, 2017, was postponed to October 3 after a "computer error" during vote counting necessitated a revote.

== Recipients ==
News programs

- Vremya (Channel One) — 2002, 2006, 2007
- Vesti (Russia TV) — 1995, 2001
- Segodnia (NTV) — 1996, 1997, 1998, 1999, 2004
- Vesti with Sergey Brilyov (Rossiya 1) — 2006
- Nedelia s Mariannoy Maximovskoy (REN TV) — 2008, 2009, 2010
- News 24 with Mikhail Osokin (REN TV) — 2010
- Culture News (Kultura) — 2003

Game shows

- Umniki i umnitsy (Channel One) — 1996, 2001
- What? Where? When? (Channel One) — 1997, 2001
- Zov Djungley (Channel One) — 1999
- O, shastlivchik (NTV) — 2000
- Srazis s Natsiey (Bibigon) — 2008
- Total Recall (Bibigon) — 2008

Other

- Gentleman show (Channel One, NTV, Rossiya 1) — 1994
- KOAPP (Channel One, TV Company "Class!") — 2001
- Spokoinoi nochi, malyshi! (Channel One/Rossiya) — 1997, 2002, 2003
- Gorodok (Rossiya 1) — 1996, 1999, 2002
- Dancing with the Stars (Rossiya 1) — 2006
- Dve Zvezdy (Channel One) — 2008
- Thank God You're Here (CTC) — 2008
- Prozhektorperiskhilton (Channel One) — 2008, 2009, 2010
- Bolshaya raznitsa (Channel One) — 2009, 2010
- In the World of Animals (Channel One) — 1996
- V Nashu Gavan Zahodili Korabli (NTV, TV6, TBC) — 2000, 2002
- Puteshestvie Naturalista (NTV) — 2001, 2002
- Vremena (Channel One) — 2001
- Zhdi Menia (Channel One) — 2001, 2002
- Tushite Sviet (NTV, TNT, TV6, TBC) — 2001, 2002, 2004
- Shkola Zloslovia (Kultura) — 2003
- Little Non-Blue Light (Ren TV) — 2004
- Istorii v Detaliakh (CTC) — 2006
- Poka vse doma (Channel One) — 2006
- Dezhurny po strane with Mikhail Zhvanetsky (Rossiya 1) — 2006
- Sto Voprosov Vzroslomu (TV Center) — 2007
- History of Russian show business (CTC) — 2010
- Oryol i Reshka (Pyatnica!) — 2014, 2016
- Polyglot (Kultura) — 2014
- On the Knives (Pyatnica!) — 2019
- «Fortress. The History of the Russian Crisis» (Documentary. Digital media; Alexey Bokov) - 2021

=== People ===
- Vladislav Listyev — 1994
- Valentina Leontyeva — 2000
- Svetlana Sorokina — 1996, 2000, 2005
- Leonid Yakubovich — 1995, 1999
- Yelena Masyuk — 1995, 1998, 2002
- Alexander Maslyakov — 1996, 2002
- Fyodor Torstensen — 1997, 2004
- Vladimir Molchanov — 1998
- Konstantin Ernst — 1998, 2001
- Gleb Skorokhodov – 1999
- Alexander Rodnyansky — 2004, 2005
- Anastasia Zavorotnyuk — 2005
- Arkady Mayofis — 2005
- Leonid Mlechin — 2007
- Dmitry Guberniev — 2007
- Ivan Urgant — 2007, 2009, 2010, 2011, 2014, 2015, 2016
- Pyotr Tolstoy — 2007
- Ekaterina Andreeva — 2007
- Sergei Pashkov — 2007
- Kevin Owen — 2008
- Sergei Kapitsa — 2008
- Dmitrii Frolov — 2008
- Larisa Sinelshchikova — 2009

== Prize statuette ==
Bronze statuette "Orpheus"

The winners of the competition are awarded a bronze statuette "Orpheus" and a "golden" diploma, the finalists of the competition receive only a "silver" diploma. The prize presented to the winners is a sculpture of a character from ancient Greek mythology, singer and musician Orpheus, who tears his chest and plays on the strings of his soul. The author of the statuette, sculptor Ernst Neizvestny, scaled his two—meter statue of Orpheus, created in 1962, for a new award. The prizes are made in the American workshop of Ernst Neizvestny's student Jeff Blumis. One statuette weighs 8.5 kg, the cost of its manufacture at the beginning of the 2000s was one thousand US dollars.

== Criticism ==
- The film "The Great Mystery of Water", which won three awards, caused a huge resonance in society, numerous disputes and criticism from representatives of the Russian Orthodox Church, who accused the creators of occult and esoteric content passed off as science, as well as disorientation of believers. Georgy Belodurov noted that most of the academicians involved in the film are academicians of the Russian Academy of Natural Sciences. The Commission on Combating Pseudoscience and Falsification of Scientific Research of the Russian Academy of Sciences spoke extremely harshly about the film. The bulletin of the Commission notes:

"In April 2006, the Rossiya TV channel showed the masterfully shot film The Great Mystery of Water, which cannot be called anything but a lampoon on world science. At the end of 2006, the film won three TEFI awards. Thus, the TV makers have convincingly demonstrated that the most important thing for them is the rating, even if it is achieved at the cost of gross deception. And the fact that at the same time science is completely shamelessly trampled on, that medieval ideas are imposed on people, the organizers of the award show are indifferent."

- Fyodor Razzakov writes about the award to Andrei Malakhov, Quoting an article from a newspaper Izvestia:

"Today, however, Malakhov is primarily associated with the program Let them Talk by the general public, television critics, and, we are sure, those in power. It tramples on any, even the most rudimentary ideas about morality. So the presentation of the TEFI to Malakhov is unwittingly perceived as an admission of vulgarity."

- Director Oleg Dorman, who was awarded a Special Prize by the Academy of Russian Television in 2010 as part of the TEFI—2010 Award (for the film Podstrachnik), refused to accept the award, saying:

"Among the members of the Academy, its jury, founders, and so on, there are people who prevented our film from reaching the audience for eleven years. People who despise the public and who have made television the main factor in the moral and social catastrophe that has occurred over the past ten years..."

- TV journalist Evgeny Kiselyov noted in 2004:

... When the academy was just being created ten years ago — and this was happening before my eyes — the founders of the academy, the heads of the main Russian TV channels, had another calculation. There was hope that the academy would be able to somehow rally the television community and revive the departed spirit of professional solidarity. Alas, the hopes were not fulfilled. When passions were boiling around NTV, TV-6, TVS, when programs and entire channels were closed, journalists were fired and their managers, the television academy, as a rule, remained in the role of an outside observer ....

A similar opinion is shared by the television critic Slava Taroshchina. and the award-winning TV journalist Julia Muchnik.

- In the context of the postponement of the 2017 TEFI Award ceremony from June to October of the same year, Russian journalist Vladimir Kara—Murza Sr. noted:

"…The premium is heading for its downfall. It is necessary or Posner to return, or to find another unifying figure. It seems to me that such a person can become Leonid Parfenov. But I'm afraid that none of the founders wants honest judging — everyone wants to amuse themselves. Unfortunately, today the award does not reflect the level of professional skill in any way, and it is not related to the quality of work. The driving force is the lobby. If TEFI wants to continue giving prizes Dmitry Kiselyov, Olga Skabeeva, Valery Fadeev, who do not deserve to win, so there is no need to change anything. "TEFI" will disappear on its own sooner or later…"
