= Irina Mishina =

Russian journalist (born 1962)

- Ирина Мишина
- Born: Irina Anatolyevna Mishina; 5 November 1962 (age 64); Moscow, Soviet Union
- Occupations: Journalist; Television presenter
- Years active: 1984–present
- Spouse: Andrey Barkovsky
- Children: 1

Irina Anatolyevna Mishina (Russian: Ирина Анатольевна Мишина; born 5 November 1962) is a Russian journalist and television presenter. She has worked at Radio Mayak, at REN TV and the NTV Plus service. Mishina has also presented news programmes such as the Vremya and Novosti news bulletins on Channel One. She has also had her works published in the Moskovskij Komsomolets, Komsomolskaya Pravda, Novaya Gazeta, Nasha Versia and the Argumenty i Fakty newspapers.

== Biography ==
Mishina was born in Moscow on 5 November 1962. Her mother died shortly after Mishina was born and she was brought up by her father. She began working at the Moskovskij Komsomolets newspaper when she was 16. Mishina is a 1983 graduate of the full-time television department of the MSU Faculty of Journalism with honours and was an intern at the State Committee of Television and Radio Broadcasting of the Soviet Union. She began working in television in mid-1984, joining the Main Directorate of Foreign Relations at Soviet Central Television. Mishina was junior editor in the department of joint filming with foreign countries of the Main Directorate of International Relations, helping representatives of leading foreign television companies. She worked at Radio Mayak from 1986 to 1989. Mishina held the positions of junior letters editor, correspondent, international news commentator and live broadcast presenter.

From 1989 to 1991, she was the presenter of the morning infotainment programmes 120 Minutes and Morning on Channel One. Mishina began presenting the Vremya news bulletin in June 1991. She announced the dissolution of the Soviet Union in December 1991. She was also a columnist for the programme as well as for Novosti until 1996 when she was sacked by the channel's president Boris Berezovsky. Mishina was the first female Russian journalist to report from the front lines of a battle zone with the Tajikistan: Half a Step from War and Army – a New Sight filmed on the Afghanistan–Tajikistan border in 1996. A year earlier, she was invited by the Reuters news agency to present the information and publicistic program Before and After... until the programme ended after six months and went on to present Big Planet in 1996.

In 1996, Mishina authored the book On the Other Side of the Air about the behind-the-scenes side of the television industry. She was a presenter of informational news programmes on REN TV from 1997 to 2000, such as What Happened? between October 1997 and January 1999 before going on to work on her own project on the channel from January 1999, alternating the presenting job in the former programme with Andrey Illesh. She left REN TV because of disagreements with the channel's president Irena Lesnevskaya. In 2001, Mishina presented the Moscovia talk show programme Rubicon about individuals who have survived extreme situations and started a new life. She joined the Novaya Gazeta newspaper as a columnist the following year.

Since 2005, Mishina has worked as a screenwriter and director of auteur films and was the director of documentaries at the United Media Group television studio. She has been the author of the Who is Who channel on the NTV Plus service and the director of films and programmes 12 November 2007, being promoted to the job of editor-in-chief in 2009. In 2013, Mishina returned to journalism as the author and director of the programme The Complex Case with Irina Mishina produced by the IMI-TV television studio. She is the author of more than 100 investigative journalism pieces. Mishina has also had her works published in the Komsomolskaya Pravda, Nasha Versia and the Argumenty i Fakty newspapers. She teaches the Television Mastery course to high school students at the Media School of the Palace of Pioneers of the Moscow Department of Education.

== Personal life ==
She is married to Andrey Barkovsky. They have one child. In June 2003, Mishina was burgled by several young men outside the entrance of her apartment in Moscow, receiving a severe facial injury.

== Awards ==
She was the recipient of the Diploma from the Russian Union of Journalists as a director of the television programme series Photo Album. the Prize of the First All-Russian Festival “Profession: Journalist” for the film Mr. X of Soviet Television, Laureate of the 13th Eurasian Teleforum (film “Petr Leshchenko. Under a Foreign Sky), Laureate of the Union of Journalists’ Prize “For Professional Excellence” "for a series of television programs about outstanding figures in contemporary culture and journalism and the Awarded a First Degree Diploma at the nternational festival in Sevastopol for the film Man of Flight.
