= Ekaterina Andreeva (journalist) =

Russian journalist, actress and anchor (born 1961–1965)

- Екатерина Андреева
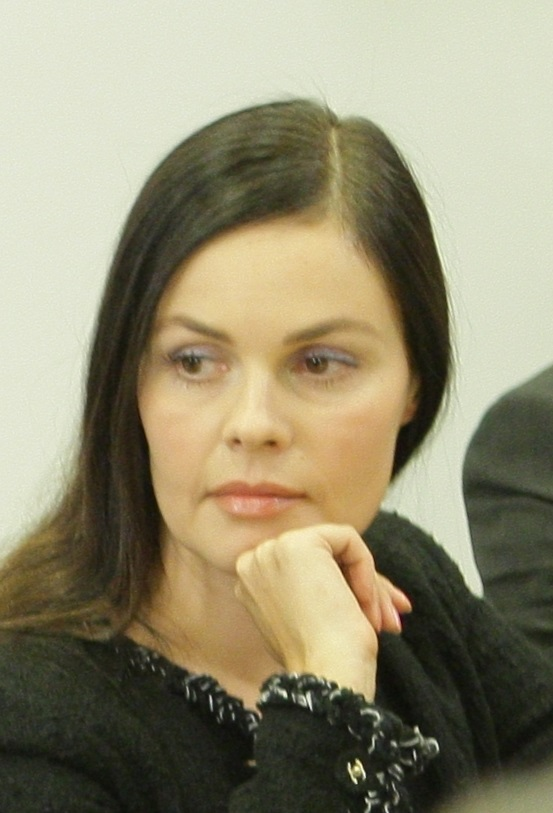
- Andreeva in 2011
- Born: Ekaterina Sergeevna Andreeva; 27 November 1965 (age 60); Moscow, Russian SFSR, Soviet Union
- Citizenship: Soviet Union: Russia; Montenegro; Honduras
- Occupations: Journalist; television presenter; announcer; contributing editor; actress

Ekaterina Sergeevna Andreeva (Russian: Екатери́на Серге́евна Андре́ева; born 27 November 1965) is a Russian journalist, actress and anchor of Vremya and Novosti, Channel One Russia's main evening news bulletins since 1997.

== Biography ==
Her father was a deputy chairman of the Gossnab of USSR, and her mother was a housewife. Ekaterina Andreeva has a younger sister, Svetlana. As a child, she had an interest in basketball, and briefly studied at the School of Olympic Reserve.

In 1990, she entered the All-union training courses for radio and television broadcasters (with the USSR Radio and Television). She studied with Igor Kirillov.

In 1991, Andreeva began working in television as an announcer leading the program Good morning at the Central Television and broadcasting company, Ostankino. In 1995, she began working for the TV Company ORT as the information program editor and presenter of the program Novosti.

She was awarded the Order of Friendship in 2006 and was awarded TEFI in 2007.

In 2010, she was listed among the top 10 of Russian TV presenters.

In August 2014, Ukraine included Andreeva in the sanctions list due to her position on the war in the east of Ukraine and the annexation of Crimea by Russia.

In October 2020, during the COVID-19 pandemic in Russia, Andreeva drew backlash after she supported the anti-mask movement.

On 14 March 2022, during a live television broadcast, Andreeva's colleague Marina Ovsyannikova staged a protest against the Russian invasion of Ukraine by holding up an anti-war sign behind her. Although the incident received international media attention, Andreeva herself did not support the protest. In fact, in 2022, she publicly expressed support for Russia’s invasion of Ukraine. On 8 July 2022, she was included in Canada’s sanctions list of “Russian disinformation agents” for “enabling and supporting Russia’s unprovoked and unjustified invasion of Ukraine.” On 16 June 2025, she was banned from entering Latvia indefinitely and added to the country’s list of undesirable persons. On 29 January 2026, Andreeva was sanctioned by the European Union for her role in disseminating state propaganda and disinformation in support of Russia’s war against Ukraine.

== Personal life ==
Andreeva is married to Dušan (Duško) Perović, a Serbian businessman who has headed the representative office of the Republika Srpska in Russia since 2010. In 2023, the United States imposed sanctions against him for lobbying on behalf of pro-Russian Republika Srpska leader Milorad Dodik.

Andreeva has a daughter, Natalya, from her first marriage.

In April 2025, the head of the Anti-Corruption Foundation (FBK), Maria Pevchikh, stated that the FBK had appealed to the Montenegrin authorities to revoke the citizenship of TV host Yekaterina Andreyeva. FBK lawyer Vyacheslav Gimadi wrote on his Twitter page that, under the law, “Montenegrin citizenship is terminated if the behavior of a ‘specially significant citizen’ causes serious damage to the country’s vital interests.” On April 17, 2025, the FBK published a new investigation revealing that Andreyeva had obtained Honduran citizenship on November 27, 2005, through her husband, Duško Perović, whose Honduran citizenship had been reported by Komsomolskaya Pravda in late 2004.
