= Bodrov =

Bodrov (Russian: Бодро́в) and Bodrova (Russian: Бодро́ва; feminine) is a Russian surname. Notable people with the surname include:

- Denis Bodrov (born 1986), Russian professional ice hockey defenseman
- Ihor Bodrov (born 1987), Ukrainian sprinter
- Mikhail Bodrov (1903–1988), Soviet diplomat
- Nadiya Bodrova, Ukrainian hurdler
- Nonna Bodrova (1928–2009), Russian news presenter
- Sergei Bodrov (born 1948), Soviet and Russian film director, screenwriter, and producer
- Sergei Bodrov Jr. (1971–2002), Russian actor and son of Sergei Bodrov
- Yevgeni Bodrov (born 1988), Russian professional ice hockey player
