= Ekaterina Andreeva =

Ekaterina Andreeva may refer to:

- Ekaterina Andreeva (arachnologist)
- Ekaterina Andreeva (journalist)
- Ekaterina Andreeva (swimmer)
