= Yevgeni Kochergin =

Russian presenter (born 1945)

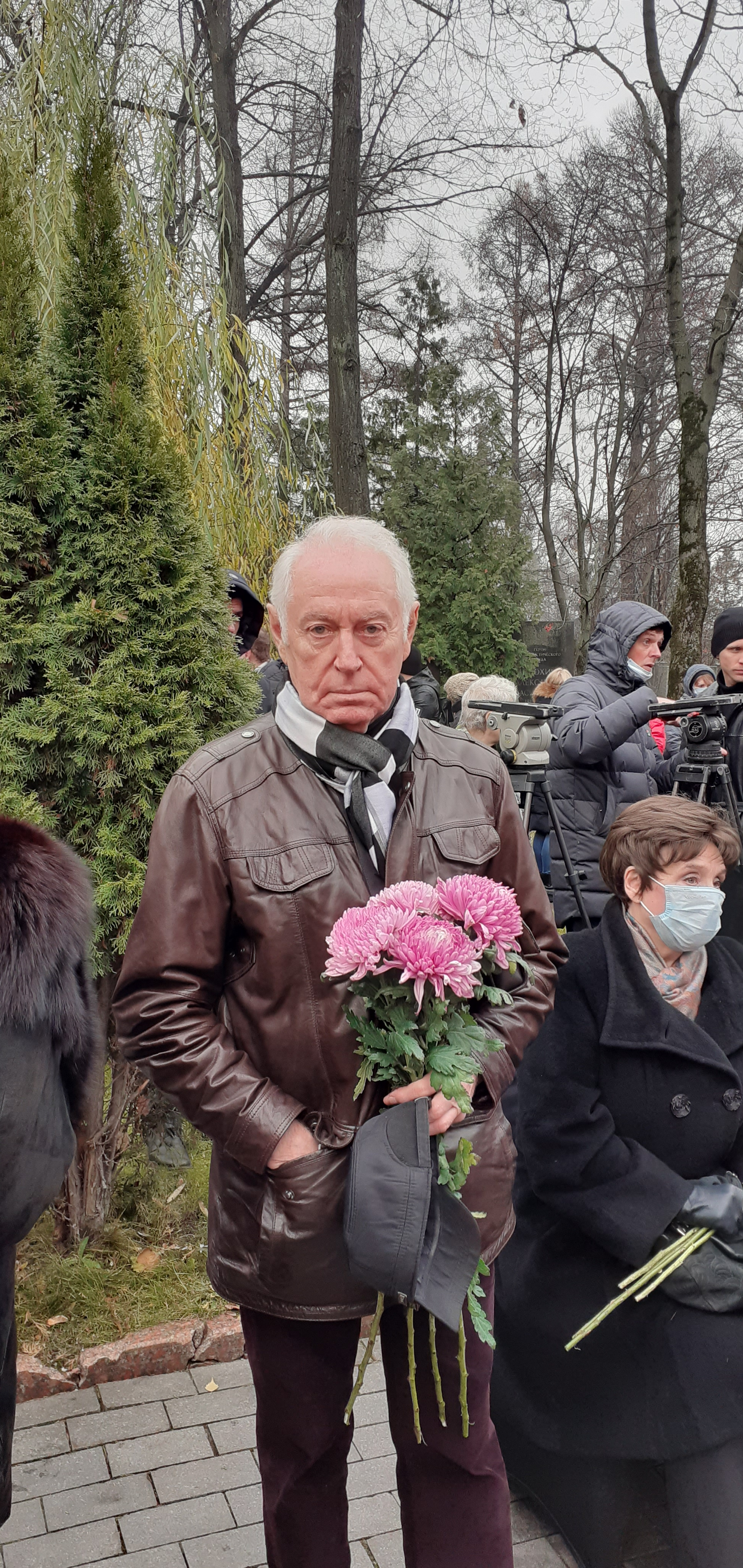
- Born: 7 November 1945 (age 80); Stalingrad, Russian SFSR, Soviet Union
- Occupation: TV presenter
- Years active: 1972–present
- Spouse: Nina Guseva

Yevgeni Aleksandrovich Kochergin (Russian: Eвге́ний Алeкса́ндрович Кoчeрги́н; born 7 November 1945, Stalingrad, USSR) is a Soviet and Russian speaker and presenter. The announcer Central Television Broadcaster of the USSR. He awarded the honorary title of Honored Artist of Russia.

18 to 21 August 1991, the period of August coup on the central television program Vremya (Russian: Время) with the speaker Vera Shebeko issued a statement State Committee on the State of Emergency on discharge from the post of President of the USSR Gorbachev and the introduction of a state of emergency.

== Personal life ==
His wife, Nina Guseva, is a civil engineer. He had two daughters from two marriages: Irina Volodina (15 September 1979 – 14 January 2016; was killed by falling elevator), a graduate of MGIMO, and Natalia, a lawyer.
