= Anna Shatilova =

Soviet television presenter

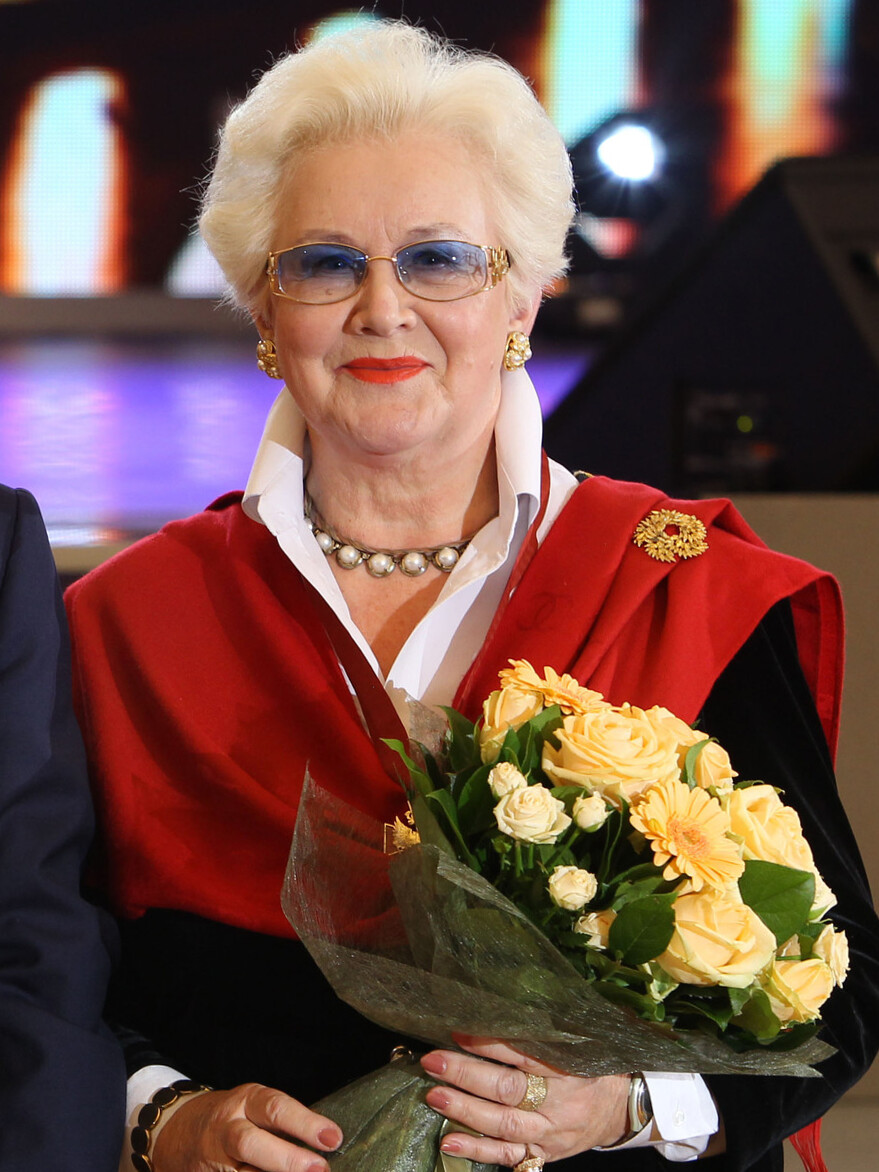
- In awarding the Order of Merit of III degree
- Born: Anna Nikolaevna Shatilova; 26 November 1938 (age 87); Shihovo, Odintsovsky District, Moscow Oblast, Russian SFSR, USSR
- Education: Krupskaya Moscow Regional Pedagogical Institute
- Occupations: speaker, TV presenter
- Years active: 1962 — present
- Awards: Order "For Merit to the Fatherland", Order "For Merit in Culture and Art", Order of Honour, Medal "For the Development of Virgin Lands", People's Artist of the RSFSR, Honored Artist of the RSFSR

Anna Nikolaevna Shatilova (Russian: А́нна Никола́евна Шати́лова; born November 26, 1938, Shihovo, Odintsovsky District, Moscow Oblast, Russian SSR, USSR) is a Soviet and Russian speaker and presenter. The announcer Central Television Broadcaster of the USSR (1962-1995). Honored Artist of the RSFSR (1978), People's Artist of the RSFSR (1988).

Known for many years a duet with Igor Kirillov.

== Biography ==
Anna Shatilova was born on November 26, 1938, into the family of Nikolai Ivanovich Pankin, a participant in the Great Patriotic War. Her father went missing in October 1941. His fate was learned sixty years later: he died when she was five years old, one hundred kilometers from Leipzig, in the Zeithain prisoner-of-war camp. Her mother worked as a cook at the Shikhov orphanage, where children who had been orphaned during the war were taken.

Anna spent her childhood in Zvenigorod, where she graduated from Secondary School No. 2 with a gold medal. From the age of five or six, she began reciting poems on stage, such as the lyrical "Birch Tree" and the patriotic "Ballad of Zaslonov and His Adjutant Zhenka." In her opinion, it was then that her voice developed naturally. As a schoolgirl, she participated in amateur performances.

After finishing school, she studied at the Physics and Mathematics Department of the Krupskaya Moscow Regional Pedagogical Institute. In her third year, together with other students, she was sent by the institute for three weeks to the Altai virgin lands to harvest grain and beets.

Having returned from the virgin lands, she accidentally read an announcement in the dormitory of the institute in Malakhovka about recruiting announcers for the All-Union Radio of the USSR State Television and Radio Broadcasting Company, took a risk - and passed the selection: out of five hundred people, five were selected, and later only three ended up on television. The selection was conducted by the leading announcers of the Soviet era Olga Sergeevna Vysotskaya and Yuri Levitan, known throughout the country for the reports of the "Sovinformburo" and the radio news they transmitted from the front during the Great Patriotic War. Subsequently, they became her teachers and mentors in the profession. In addition to Vysotskaya and Levitan, Anna's teacher was another famous Soviet announcer of the All-Union Radio of the USSR State Television and Radio Broadcasting Company - Vladimir Borisovich Gertsik.

Immediately after enrolling in the announcer courses, Shatilova transferred to the correspondence department of the philological faculty of the same institute and graduated from it.

In 1962, Anna Shatilova was accepted to the Soviet Central Television, remaining the face of Soviet television for many years. She hosted the news programs Vremya, "News", entertainment programs, among which "Blue Light" was extremely popular, as well as reports from festive processions, demonstrations, festivals.

In 1963, the young announcer Anna Shatilova was instructed to read an urgent TASS report on the assassination of John F. Kennedy on live television.

In 1973, Shatilova was sent by the State Committee of Television and Radio Broadcasting of the Soviet Union to Japan to teach Russian language lessons on television at the invitation of a Japanese television company, where she hosted the program "Speak Russian" for a whole year. During her time working in Tokyo, she found her “signature” style of clothing.

According to Shatilova, she did not join the CPSU only because she was too lazy to learn the Party Charter.

She worked in television until 1995, and from 1991 to 1995 she remained an announcer for the Russian State Television and Radio Broadcasting Company “Ostankino”.

== See also ==
- Vremya
