= Leonid Mlechin =

Russian journalist (born 1957)

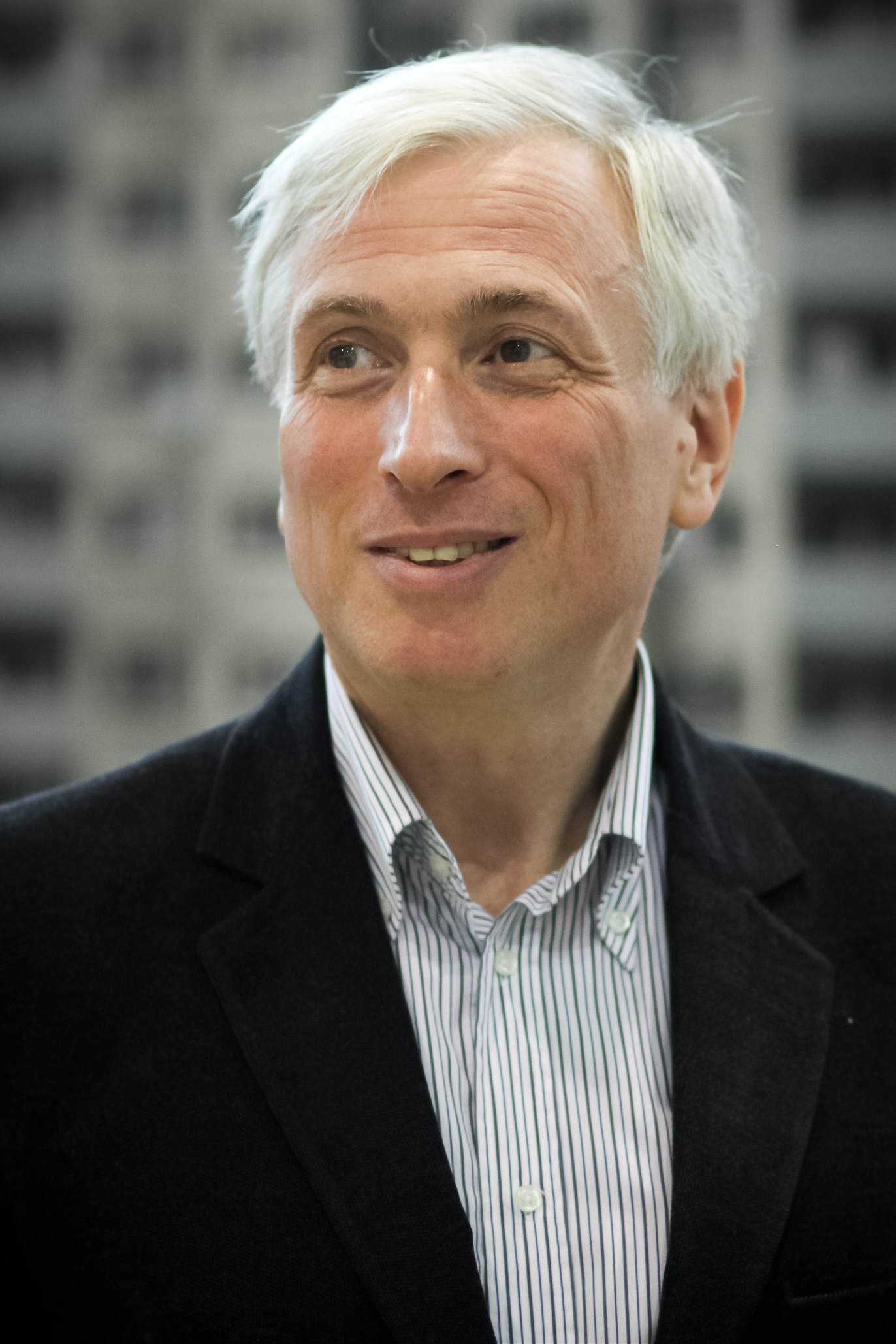
- Born: 12 June 1957; Moscow
- Writing career
- Language: Russian
- Website: mlechinshistory.ru

Leonid Mlechin (Russian: Леони́д Миха́йлович Мле́чин; born June 12, 1957, Moscow) is a Soviet and Russian journalist, international observer, moderator of the "special file" of "TV Center", and two-time winner of TEFI (2007, 2009). A member of the Writers' Union (since 1986), and Russia. Honored Worker of Culture of the Russian Federation.

== Biography ==
Mlechin graduated from the International Department of the MSU Faculty of Journalism in 1979. From 1979 to 1993 he was a reporter and columnist for the international weekly magazine "Modern Times". Afterwards he became an Editor of the international department and deputy editor of the newspaper "Izvestia". Since 1994 he has been the host of the weekly program "De facto" on the channel "Russia". He was also a member of their editorial board until 1996. In 1997 until 1999, Mlechin was the author and host of the weekly current affairs program "The whole world without borders." In November 1997 he authored and hosted the weekly program "Late dinner." In 1997 he was the author of the weekly current affairs program "The Seventh Day" on TV Center. In January 1998 Mlechin was author and host of the journalistic program "Special Folder". In September 1999 he became the lead commentator on the daily current affairs program "Events". From July to December 2010 he was the co-host of the "Court of time."

Mlechin is a regular contributor and member of the editorial board of the journal "New Time", by the "Expert." Mlechin regularly appears in the broadcast Osoboye mneniye of the Echo of Moscow.

== Family ==
Mlechin's was born to Irina Mlechin (b. 1935), a translator with a doctor of philology degree. His stepfather was Vitaly Syrokomsky (1929-2006), a Soviet journalist.

== Publications ==
=== Books ===
Author of many books, translated into English, Japanese, Spanish, Polish and other languages.

- Mlechin L.M. Children who are deprived childhood. Essays. - Moscow: Pos. Lit., 1980.
- Mlechin L.M. Syrokomsky VA Children who are deprived of childhood, New York City: Children's Books, 1980, 145s.
- Mlechin L.M. Verge of madness. The political story. - M. Mol. Guard, 1983.
- Mlechin L.M. Project "Valhalla." The political story. - M. Mol. Guard, 1983. 127., Ill. (Series "Arrow")
- Mlechin L.M. Last thing Inspector Imai. M. Legal Literature. 1984 224s.
- Mlechin L.M. FBI Special Agent. - Moscow: Legal. Lit., 1989.
- Mlechin L.M. In the shadow of the shrine. Essays. - Moscow: Pos. Lit., 1990.
- Mlechin L.M. My fellow dictators.
- Mlechin L.M. Biggest mystery of the Führer.
- Mlechin L.M. Russian army between Trotsky and Stalin.
- Mlechin L.M. KGB. Chairpersons of state security bodies. Declassified fate.
- Mlechin L.M. Late dinner.
- Mlechin L.M. Who bombed America. Empire of terror 'Red Brigades' to 'Islamic Jihad'.
- Mlechin L.M. Short life, long death.
- Mlechin L.M. History of the Foreign Intelligence Service. Career and destiny.
- Mlechin L.M. Famous suicides.
- Mlechin L.M. World. Accidental war.
- Mlechin L.M. Iron Shurik.
- Mlechin L.M. Network Moscow-OGPU-Paris, M.: End of the Century, 1991, 207s.
- Mlechin L.M. "Farmer" reports from Paris, IPK "Moskovskaya Pravda", 1992, 64c.
- Mlechin L.M. Alibi for a great singer [Dance with General] (series "Supershpionki twentieth century"), M. Gay, 1997, 272s.
- Mlechin L.M. Yevgeny Primakov. The story of one's career, Moscow, 1999.
- Mlechin L.M. Kremlin. The presidents of Russia. Strategy of power from Yeltsin to Putin. - M.: Tsentrpoligraf, 2002. - 703 p. ISBN 5-227-01931-2.
- Mlechin L.M. Brezhnev. M.: Young Guard, 2008. 624 c., Ill. (A series of "great people») ISBN 978-5-235-03114-2.
- Mlechin L.M. Yevgeny Primakov. M.: Young Guard, 2008 (series of "great people. Biography continues").
- Mlechin L.M. MFA. The Ministers of Foreign Affairs: Romantics and Cynics. - M.: Tsentrpoligraf, 2001.
- Mlechin L.M. Famous suicide. - M.: Detective Press, 2001.
- Mlechin L.M. Cold War: politics, generals, intelligence officers. - Moscow Tsentropoligraf, 2009. - 274 p.
- Mlechin L.M. Shelepin. - 2009. - 389 c., Ill. - 3000 copies. - ISBN 978-5-235-03221-7.
- Mlechin L.M. Why Stalin killed Trotsky. - M.: Tsentrpoligraf, 2010. - 351 p. ISBN 978-5-227-02270-7.
- Mlechin L.M. Furtseva. - 2011.
- Mlechin L.M. Munich 72: Bloody Olympics. - M.: "Yauza" "Eksmo" 2005.
- Mlechin L.M. Putin, Bush and the war in Iraq. - M.: "Yauza" "Eksmo" 2005.
- Mlechin L.M. Nazarbayev. Group portrait of the president. 2011.
- Mlechin L.M. Lenin. Seduction Russia. - St.: Peter, 2012. - 432 c. - 3500 copies. - ISBN 978-5-459-00708-4.

== Awards ==
- Order of Friendship (16 November 2011) - for his contribution to the development of domestic broadcasting and many years of activity.
- Medal of the Order "For Services to the Fatherland" II degree (June 27, 2007) - for outstanding contributions to the development of national television and long-term work
- Honored Worker of Culture of the Russian Federation (14 August 2004) - for many years of work in the fields of Culture, Media and Broadcasting.
- Winner of "TEFI-2007" for "Written television program" ("Women who dreamed of power").
- Winner of "TEFI-2009" for "The best writer of the documentary television series" ("The heroes and victims of the Cold War").
