= Marina Ovsyannikova =

Russian journalist (born 1978)

- Марина Овсянникова
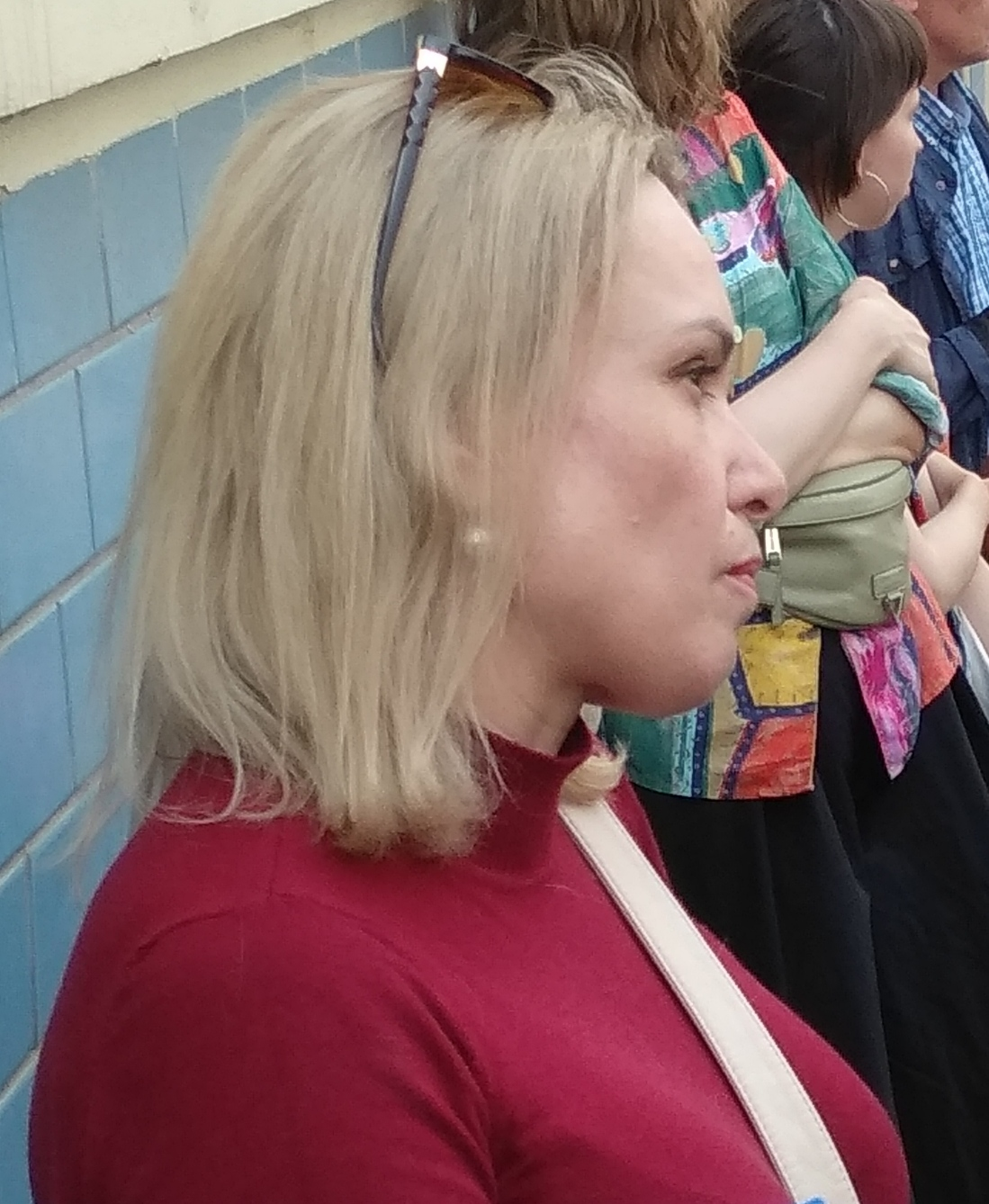
- Ovsyannikova in 2022
- Born: Marina Vladimirovna Tkachuk; 19 June 1978 (age 48); Odesa, Ukrainian SSR, Soviet Union
- Education: Kuban State University; Russian Presidential Academy of National Economy and Public Administration
- Occupation: Journalist
- Employer(s): Channel One Russia (2003–2022); Die Welt (2022)
- Children: 2

Marina Vladimirovna Ovsyannikova (Russian: Мари́на Влади́мировна Овся́нникова, Russian pronunciation; née Tkachuk (Ткачу́к); born 19 June 1978) is a Russian journalist who was employed on the Channel One Russia television channel. She worked for Russia's main evening newscast Vremya on Channel One since the beginning of the 2000s, later describing her role as "producing Kremlin propaganda".

In March 2022, she interrupted a broadcast of Vremya to protest against the 2022 Russian invasion of Ukraine, which made international news headlines. She was arrested, held without access to her lawyer, fined 30,000 rubles (280 dollars at the time), and later released. As of early October 2022, she is wanted by the Russian justice system after escaping her pre-trial house arrest; her lawyer says that she fled to Europe. In February 2023, it was revealed she had fled to Paris, France with her daughter.

== Early life and career ==
Ovsyannikova was born on 19 June 1978 in Odesa, Ukrainian SSR, Soviet Union. Her mother is Russian, and her father is Ukrainian. She lived with her mother in Grozny until the start of the Chechen War, but then they moved to Krasnodar. As a child, she practiced swimming and artistic gymnastics. Her swimming team won the university level Krasnodar championship competitions.

Ovsyannikova graduated from the Kuban State University and later from the Russian Presidential Academy of National Economy and Public Administration (RANEPA). She worked for the All-Russia State Television and Radio Broadcasting Company (VGTRK). Since 1997, she was a journalist and news presenter for the "Kuban" TV channel (a regional subsidiary of VGTRK), and a favorite of its head Vladimir Runov, who is claimed to have helped her enter RANEPA.

In 2003, after moving to Moscow, she was hired by Channel One Russia. Politico wrote: "Since 2003, her job was to watch Western news streams and press conferences, and collect excerpts that made the West look bad and Russia look good". The Telegraph described Ovsyannikova during her time at Channel One as a "state mouthpiece" and "the flesh and blood of the Kremlin's propaganda machine". Ovsyannikova retroactively described herself as "having spent many years producing Kremlin propaganda" while working for Channel One.

== Anti-war protests ==
Shortly after this part, broadcasting switched to a pre-recorded feature on a medical topic

Ovsyannikova initially supported Putin, but images of the war in Ukraine brought back memories of the war she experienced as a child in Chechnya. She had planned to protest near the Kremlin, but later decided it was not very useful.

On 14 March 2022, during a live broadcast related to the Russian invasion of Ukraine on the evening news programme Vremya, which had millions of viewers, she appeared behind the news anchor, Ekaterina Andreeva, carrying a poster stating in a mix of Russian and English:

(Ukraine) No War (Russia)
Russian: Остановите войну
не верьте пропаганде
здесь вам врут, romanized: Ostanovite voynu, ne verte propagande, zdes vam vrut
[Stop the war, don't believe the propaganda, here you are being lied to.]
Russians against war

Ovsyannikova shouted:

Russian: Остановите войну! Нет войне!, romanized: Ostanovite voynu! Nyet voyne! [Stop the war! No war!]

After a few seconds, the broadcast cut away to a recorded segment. The recording of the news program was not available for download, which is uncommon for this TV channel. The protest was unusual as the state-operated program does not deviate from the Kremlin line of a "special military operation", and viewers had previously not been told that the Russian invasion of Ukraine was a war.

=== Pre-recorded message ===
After Ovsyannikova's on-air protest, Russian human rights group OVD-Info posted a video she had pre-recorded on Telegram. In the video, she stated that she was "ashamed of working for Kremlin propaganda":

What is happening in Ukraine is a crime. Russia is an aggressor country and the responsibility for this aggression rests on the conscience of only one person. That person is Vladimir Putin. My father is Ukrainian, my mother is Russian, and they've never been enemies. This necklace I'm wearing (Note: Ovsyannikova refers to her parents as well as to her necklace in the colors of the Russian and Ukrainian flags to symbolize that Ukrainians and Russians are not enemies and to urge Russia to stop the fratricidal war.) is a symbol of that fact that Russia must immediately end this fratricidal war and our fraternal peoples will still be able to reconcile. Unfortunately, I've spent the last few years working for Channel One, doing Kremlin propaganda, and I'm very ashamed of this. Ashamed that I allowed lies to be broadcast from TV screens. Ashamed that I allowed others to zombify Russian people. We were silent in 2014 when all this started. We didn't protest when the Kremlin poisoned Navalny. We just silently watched this inhuman regime at work. And now the whole world has turned its back on us. And the next ten generations won't wash away the stain of this fratricidal war. We Russians are thinking and intelligent people. It's in our power alone to stop all this madness. Go protest. Don't be afraid of anything. They can't lock us all away.

=== Reactions ===
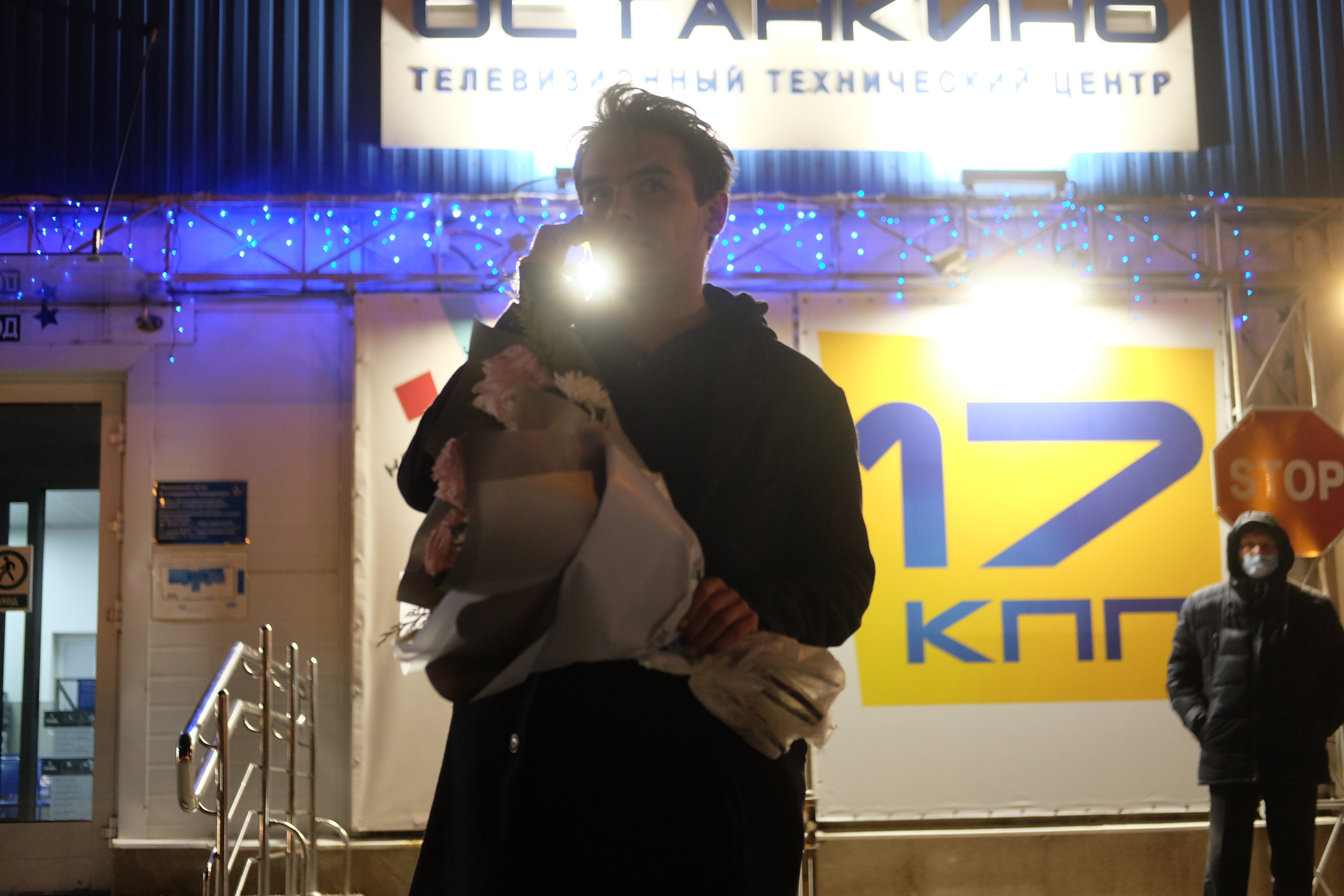
Denis Zakharov, an anti-war activist, on the night of 15 March 2022, in front of the Ostankino television center. He is waiting for the detained Marina Ovsyannikova to express his words of support and give her a bouquet of flowers.

Clips of Ovsyannikova's protest were widely shared around the world and attracted substantial global media coverage.

Ukrainian president Volodymyr Zelenskyy thanked Ovsyannikova during one of his broadcasts. French president Emmanuel Macron offered Ovsyannikova protection at the French embassy or through asylum. Russian government spokesman Dmitry Peskov referred to her protest as "hooliganism".

Russian opposition politician Lev Shlosberg said, "Five seconds of truth can wash away the dirt of weeks of propaganda." Russian opposition politician Ilya Yashin described Ovsyannikova as a "hero of Russia". The detained Kremlin critic Alexei Navalny lauded Ovsyannikova for her defiance during his final statement in court.

The BBC reported that Ovsyannikova's protest had drawn attention to a gradual stream of resignations from Russian state-run TV, with three others emerging within hours.

Kirill Kleimyonov, head of Channel One Russia's news division, accused her of being a "British spy" and said she called the British embassy prior to the onstage protest. The UK Foreign Office said there was no contact prior to the on-screen protest.

=== Persecutions and activism ===
Ovsyannikova was detained and taken to Ostankino police station. Her lawyer was not able to contact or even locate her for more than 12 hours. The morning after the broadcast, her whereabouts were still unknown. It was reported Ovsyannikova may face up to 15 years in prison under Russia's disinformation laws about the Ukrainian invasion.

Later on 15 March, the Twitter account of Kevin Rothrock, an editor at Meduza, posted a picture showing Ovsyannikova with Anton Gashinsky, a human rights lawyer, in court. For the video posted on Telegram, Ovsyannikova was charged with organizing an unauthorized public event and fined 30,000 rubles ($280, £200 or €255). Russian state news agency TASS reported that Russia's Investigative Committee was also investigating Ovsyannikova for the on-air protest on charges of publicly spreading "false information" about Russia's invasion of Ukraine. Under a new law passed on 4 March, she could be prosecuted for calling the invasion of Ukraine a war instead of the government's euphemism "special military operation" and sentenced to up to 15 years in prison.

On 17 March, Ovsyannikova quit her job on Channel One Russia. She stated that she rejected asylum in France, and was to stay in Russia with her children.

It was announced on 11 April 2022, that Ovsyannikova had accepted, with immediate effect, work as a freelance correspondent for Axel Springer SE's German newspaper Die Welt, covering Russia and Ukraine. Shortly after she moved to Berlin, Germany, leaving her children behind in Russia as her ex-husband did not give her permission to take the children out of the country.

On 25 May 2022, during the annual Oslo Freedom Forum in Oslo, Norway, Ovsyannikova received the Václav Havel Prize for Creative Dissent. This prize is given to honor "those who, with bravery and ingenuity, unmask the lies of dictatorship, and who put forth work that exemplifies tremendous courage and creativity".

Between 27 and 31 May 2022, Ovsyannikova visited Ukraine as a freelance correspondent for Die Welt. The visit caused public uproar, which forced Die Welt to abort the visit and evacuate Ovsyannikova from the country.

After her contract with Die Welt expired, Ovsyannikova returned to Russia. On 15 July 2022, she made a single-person protest at the Sophia Embankment, in front of the Kremlin, with a poster reading "Putin is a murderer. His soldiers are fascists. 352 children died. How many more should die for you to stop?" Two days later, she was arrested and later released. On 9 August, a criminal case was started against her due to this event where she was charged under Russia's 2022 war censorship laws with "discrediting" the military; her home was raided by police and she was detained for questioning. She was later released, after being ordered to spend the night at Moscow police headquarters. The next day, she was put under house arrest for two months, until 9 October 2022. However, on 1 October, her husband Igor announced that she had escaped house arrest together with her 11-year-old daughter. Her immediate whereabouts were unknown. On 17 October 2022, Ovsyannikova's lawyer confirmed she had fled Russia "to one of the European countries, where she is now under protection". On the same day, Ovsyannikova was restricted of parental rights on her 10 years old daughter and 17 years old son — the court ordered that Ovsyannikova's daughter must live with her father because her mother "is involved in political activity".

On 10 February 2023, Ovsyannikova gave a press conference in Paris, France, where she now resides, and described how she was assisted by Reporters Without Borders in fleeing the country. She was offered asylum by French president Emmanuel Macron after her on-air protest, and was at the time of her escape living in various safehouses in France. She detailed her journey out of Russia, which involved changing vehicles seven times, removing the electronic surveillance bracelet from her body, and crossing the border on foot. According to the Wall Street Journal, Ovsyannikova has said that she still fears for her life: "Each time I speak with my friends in Russia they ask me, 'What would you prefer, Novichok, polonium or a car crash?' ", referring to methods the FSB has allegedly used to assassinate critics living abroad.

Ovsyannikova was tried in absentia in Russia and on 4 October 2023 was sentenced to 8.5 years jail term for "spreading false information" about the Russian Army. In a declaration, Ovsyannikova called the sentence "politically motivated".

On 3 October 2025, Russian Ministry of Justice included Ovsyannikova in its "foreign agents" list.

=== Criticism ===
News of Ovsyannikova being hired as a correspondent to cover the Russian invasion of Ukraine for Die Welt led to protests in Berlin by the Ukrainian community and war refugees due to her previous work for Russian media. The protesters demanded that she be fired, but Die Welt refused to do so, saying that she is "on the right side of history". This decision sparked discussion in journalistic circles in Germany and other countries.

In Ukraine, despite having been praised by Volodymyr Zelenskyy, Ovsyannikova is largely regarded as a propagandist of Russian official viewpoint and her appearance on TV is ignored or held against her. Ukrainian journalists were unhappy with her being awarded prizes, and her press conference in Kyiv in May 2022 was canceled due to the "uproar".

== Personal life ==
As of 2022, Ovsyannikova lived in New Moscow (the former southwest sector of Moscow Oblast appended to Moscow in 2012) with her two children. In October 2022, she took her young daughter and fled the country. They are now living in Paris. She is married to Igor Ovsyannikov, a television director for RT. The couple were reported by one source in March 2022 as being "recently separated". She has relatives in Ukraine, but she does not have much contact with them.

== See also ==
- Mediazona – Russian human rights media outlet
- Vladimir Danchev – Russian newscaster who criticized the Soviet invasion of Afghanistan on live television in 1983
- Liz Wahl – Journalist for RT America who resigned on-air in 2014
