= Gleb Skorokhodov =

Soviet writer and journalist (1930–2012)

- Born: Gleb Anatolyevich Skorokhodov; April 23, 1930; Grozny, Chechen Autonomous Oblast, USSR
- Died: October 10, 2012 (aged 82); Moscow, Russia
- Occupations: novelist, playwright, journalist, film critic, film critic, TV presenter, radio host
- Awards: TEFI

Gleb Anatolyevich Skorokhodov (Russian: Глеб Анато́льевич Скорохо́дов; April 23, 1930, Grozny – 10 October 2012, Moscow) was a Soviet and Russian writer, playwright, journalist and film critic. He was also given the title Honored Artist of Russia in 2000.

== Biography ==
His parents were Anatoliy Vladimirovich Skorokhodov (1907–1990) and Gutta Borisovna Skorokhodova (1905–1993).

Skorokhodov graduated from the Moscow State University (MSU) Faculty of Journalism. In the 1960s, he was the author and director of the main edition of the literary and drama programs of the Soviet Union and worked as a reporter and editor in the state recording studio Melodiya. He was also a lecturer at the Faculty of Journalism of the Peoples' Friendship University of Russia. Since 1970, he was an associate professor of VGIK, a Moscow film school.

He became known for his book on the history of records. In the 1990s, Skorokhodov collaborated with television broadcaster ATV. From 1993 to January 2002, he led the transfer of Raiders of the Lost (in Russian) on Channel One Russia and NTV; in 1994–95, he hosted the program Old news on radio station Nadezhda; and from 2002 to 2005 he hosted Gleb Skorokhodov's Film history on RTR. In 1999, he received the Russian Academy of Television Award (TEFI).

Skorokhodov authored books on Faina Ranevskaya, Klavdiya Shulzhenko, Leonid Utesov and other artists. He implemented literary adaptations of the books Klavdiya Shulzhenko and Lidiya Smirnova.

He died October 10, 2012, in Moscow, after a long illness when he was 82 years old. On October 13, a funeral service was held at the Cathedral of Cosmas and Damian in Shubin (Moscow), then the writer's body was cremated at Khovanskoye Cemetery. The ashes were buried at the Danilovskoye Cemetery in Moscow.
