= Liz Wahl =

American journalist

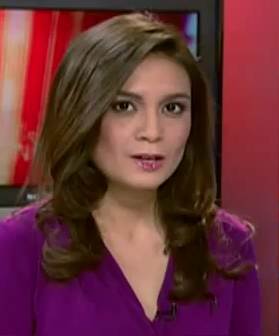
- Wahl in 2012
- Born: May 27, 1985 (age 41); Subic Naval Base, Philippines
- Education: Fairfield University
- Occupations: Journalist; correspondent; activist
- Political party: Democratic

Liz Wahl (born May 27, 1985) is an American journalist. She was a correspondent for the Russian government-sponsored RT television network from 2011 to 2014 but left the network following a harshly critical on-air resignation that went viral.

== Early life ==
Wahl was born at the U.S. Naval Base Subic Bay in the Philippines to a Filipina mother and a Hungarian American father. She was raised in Connecticut. She graduated from Fairfield University. Her paternal grandparents were refugees from Hungary, who fled the on-coming Soviet invasion during the Hungarian Uprising. Wahl cited her grandparents' experience as a factor in her public denunciation of RT and the network's coverage of the Russo-Ukrainian War.

== Career ==
=== RT America ===
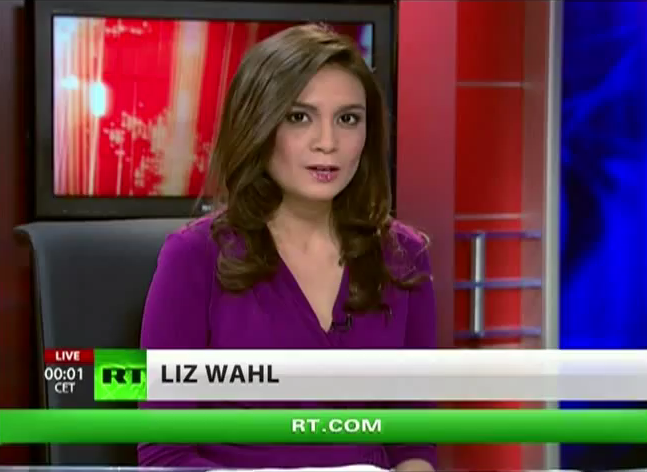
Liz Wahl on RT America, March 16, 2012

Wahl worked at the United States branch of RT since 2011. She and colleague Abby Martin began criticizing RT’s coverage of the annexation of Crimea by the Russian Federation on-air on March 3, 2014. On March 5, 2014, Wahl went off script and resigned her job during her live segment while denouncing her employer RT. Wahl stated "I cannot be part of a network funded by the Russian government that whitewashes the actions of Putin."

The video of Wahl's resignation immediately went viral on the internet, with millions of hits on YouTube. She appeared on three major American cable news outlets – CNN, Fox News, and MSNBC – was also invited to appear on The View, and the shows of Anderson Cooper, and Stephen Colbert for additional interviews.

Then RT Breaking the Set host Abby Martin criticised Wahl’s on-air resignation, which she said was a publicity stunt engineered by Bill Kristol's Foreign Policy Initiative think tank. Barbara Walters initially voiced criticism of Wahl, saying she should not be treated like a hero, but Walters recanted afterwards and praised Wahl's efforts.

Politico published Wahl's tell-all firsthand story where she detailed her early career, how she was recruited to RT, her frustrations working for the Russian-funded network. Wahl's contact, James Kirchick, admitted to having foreknowledge of her resignation but denied suggestions that he had orchestrated the event, stating that Wahl did what she did out of her own volition and that she initially reached out to him months earlier following his own on-air protest on the network against anti-gay legislation in Russia. Wahl told David Weigel writing for Slate that her detractors were behaving as though her contact with Kirchick were part of a conspiracy. It began following his unexpected criticism of Russia's anti-gay laws during his appearance on RT.

=== Post-RT career ===
Wahl has reported for Newsy. Wahl spoke at a peace conference in the Hague and addressed the Parliament of Canada on foreign interference in the digital era.

In January 2019, Wahl announced her candidacy in the 2020 election for the United States House of Representatives Texas's 23rd congressional district as a Democrat. Wahl failed to appear on the ballot for the Democratic primary on March 3, 2020.

== See also ==
- List of on-air resignations
- Marina Ovsyannikova
- Vladimir Danchev
