= Igor Fesunenko =

Soviet writer and journalist (1933–2016)

- Born: И́горь Серге́евич Фесуне́нко; 28 January 1933; Orenburg, USSR
- Died: 28 April 2016 (aged 83); Moscow, Russia
- Education: Moscow Historical Archives Institute
- Occupations: Journalist, Author, Teacher
- Parent(s): Sergey Fesunenko; Evdokia Fesunenko

Igor Fesunenko (28 January 1933, Orenburg, RSFSR, Soviet Union – 28 April 2016, Moscow, Russia) was a Soviet and Russian journalist, foreign affairs writer, and teacher at the MGIMO.

== Biography ==
His father, Sergey Fesunenko, worked as a chief mechanic at the Zaporozhye aluminum plant. The whole family moved there when the war broke out, and they were evacuated to the Urals aluminum plant, where his father worked in the production of aluminum for aircraft. His mother, Evdokia Ivanovna, graduated from law school Fesunenko in Irkutsk, was a housewife, and in 1944 returned to his father in Kiev on the recovery plant.

He was born in Orenburg, spent his childhood in Moscow and Zaporozhye, and during the war, he lived in the Urals. In 1955, he graduated from the Moscow Historical Archives Institute, historian and archivist. The next two years he served in the Soviet Army. From 1957 to 1963 he worked in godv Main Archive Department. Freelance collaborated with the Komsomolskaya Pravda and Broadcaster of the USSR, which in 1963 became a member of the Latin American edition (Fesunenko at that time owned by the Spanish). He was sent to Brazil, where he studied Portuguese.

Since 1966 — correspondent of Television in the Soviet Union in the countries of South America (news bureau in Rio de Janeiro)

In 1971 he returned to the USSR. From 1973 to 1975 the correspondent of Radio and Television of the USSR, Cuba. From 1975 to 1979 he worked in Portugal. He then worked as a political columnist and host of such programs as Today in the World, The Camera Looks Into the World, International Panorama, Vremya. In the early 1990s, he worked in Italy. In the 1990s, led to the transfer of Mayak, ORT, in the 2000s — on Channel 5 (Petersburg) after the return of the canal to the federal air.

== Award ==
He was awarded the Order of the Badge of Honour, Medal For Distinguished Labour is the title of Honorary Radio Operator. It is known for numerous books on football theme. He is a fan of the football club Botafogo (Rio de Janeiro) and CSKA (Moscow).
