= Arkady Mayofis =

Media manager

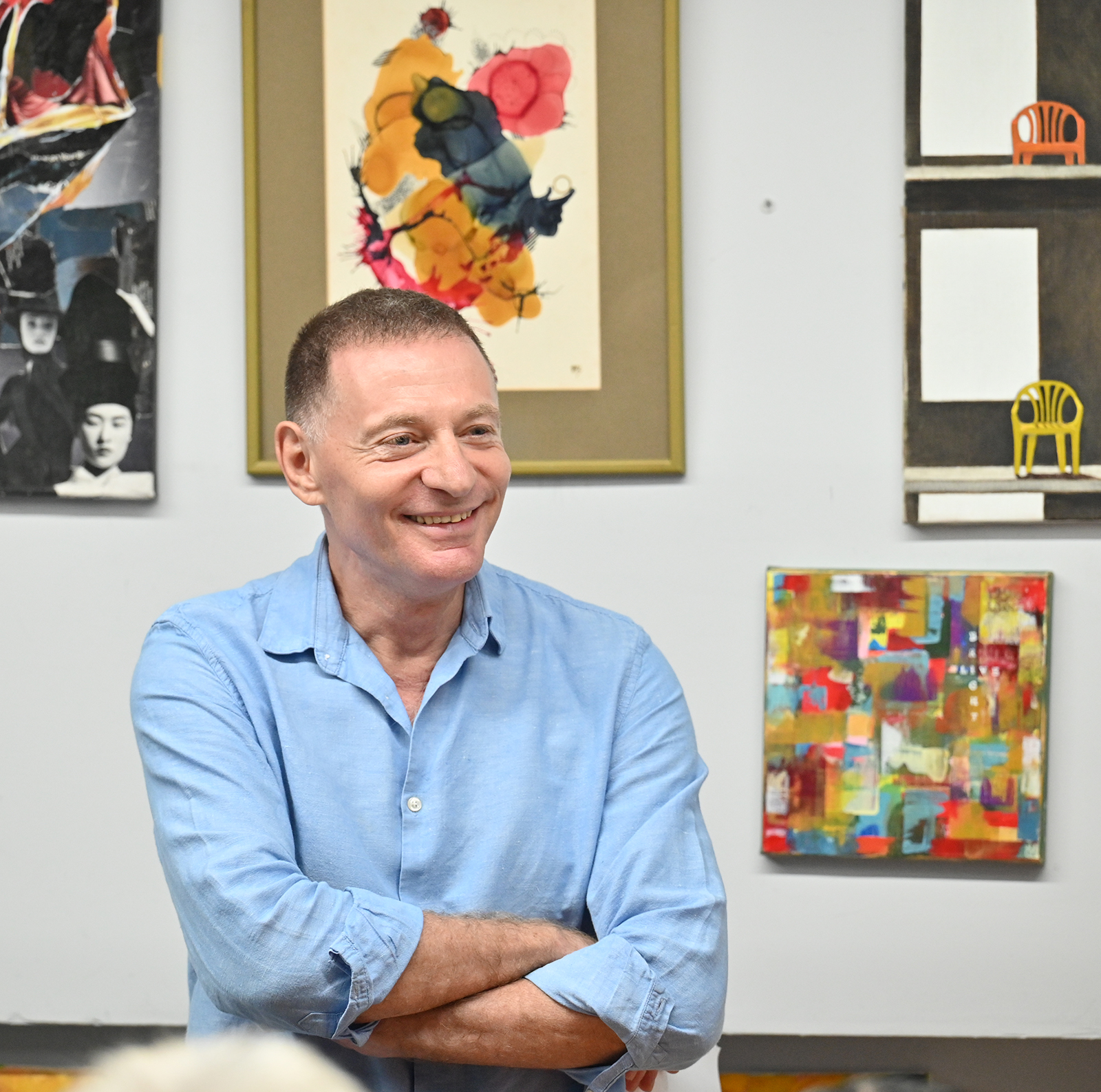
- Born: May 30, 1962 (age 64); Tomsk
- Citizenship: Russian Federation, Israel
- Education: Tomsk State University
- Occupations: media manager, entrepreneur, journalist
- Awards: TEFI, 2015

Arkady Mayofis (born May 30, 1962, Tomsk, USSR) is a Russian and Israeli media manager, entrepreneur, and journalist. He is a founder of TV-2: TV company and news agency in Tomsk, one of the first independent television studios in Russia.

Since 2015, he has been living in Israel. He is the founder of the family gift brand YOFFI.

== Biography ==
Mayofis was born in 1962 in Tomsk, Soviet Union.

Arkady graduated with honors from the Faculty of Philology at Tomsk State University. He worked as a journalist and editor on regional television.

=== TV-2 ===
In 1990, Arkady founded TV-2 — one of the first non-state TV companies in the Soviet Union. TV-2 gained widespread recognition for its high-quality journalism and independent editorial policy. The company received more than 20 TEFI awards.

Arkady Mayofis personally received a TEFI award "For Contribution to the Development of Russian Television" and was recognized as one of Russia's top media managers.

In 2002, a large regional media holding, Tomsk Media Group (TMG), was created on the basis of TV-2. It included TV channels, radio stations and advertising agencies. Arkady Mayofis initiated the creation of the holding and played a key role in its development.

In 2015, authorities launched pressure on the company due to its editorial policy on the war in Ukraine and freedom of speech and eventually refused to renew its broadcasting license. The channel was shut down, and the holding was also later dissolved.

In February 2015, Arkady Mayofis repatriated to Israel.

== Work in Israel ==
Upon repatriation, in 2015, Mayofis founded the family company YOFFI, which produced gift sets from Israeli products: dates, tahini, honey, spices, herbal teas, and dried fruits. The products were sold in duty-free shops, on Amazon, and other platforms. The word YOFFI is translated from Hebrew as "beauty" and is also part of the Mayofis family name. YOFFI gifts were purchased by Israeli universities, major corporations, and government institutions. The company is considered a pioneer in the Israeli gourmet souvenir market.

The company operated for ten years and In 2025, amid the war in Israel, ceased commercial operations. Mayofis then focused on humanitarian initiatives, philanthropy, and public commentary.

Arkady Mayofis has been included in the list of 70 most influential immigrants in Israel by “The Jerusalem Post”.

== Family ==
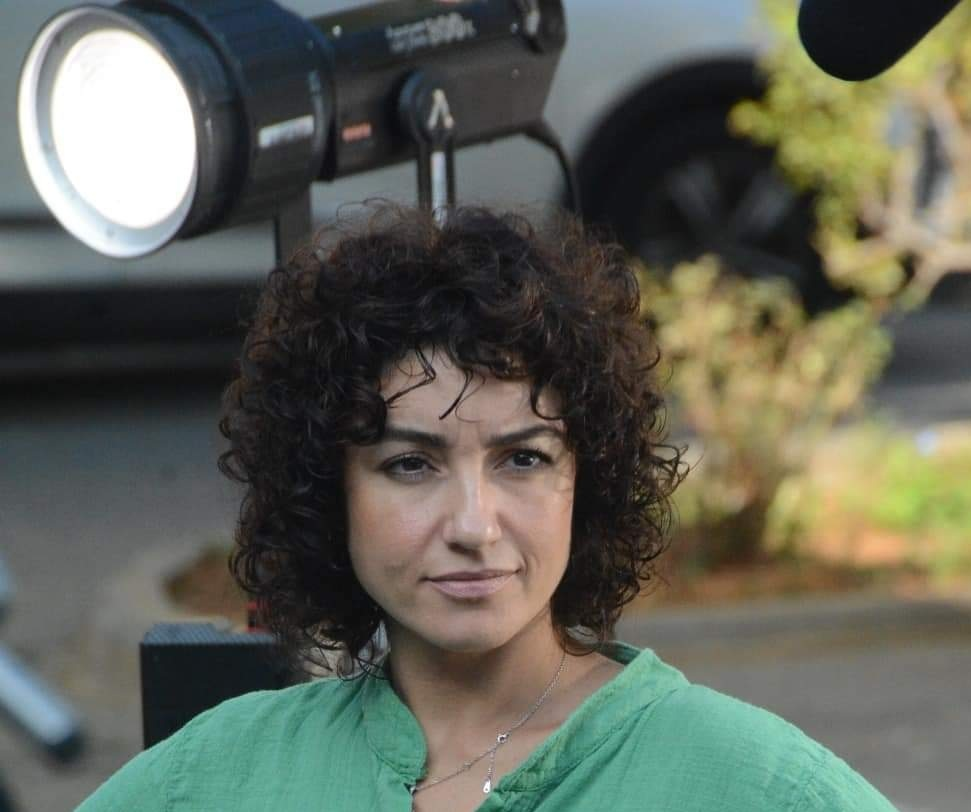
Polina Mayofis

Arkady Mayofis is married with five children.

His wife, Polina Mayofis, is a singer and vocal coach.

== Awards ==
- TEFI award “For Contribution to the Development of Russian Television”
- National award “Media Manager of Russia”
