= Alla Danko =

Russian television presenter and journalist

- Алла Георгиевна Данько
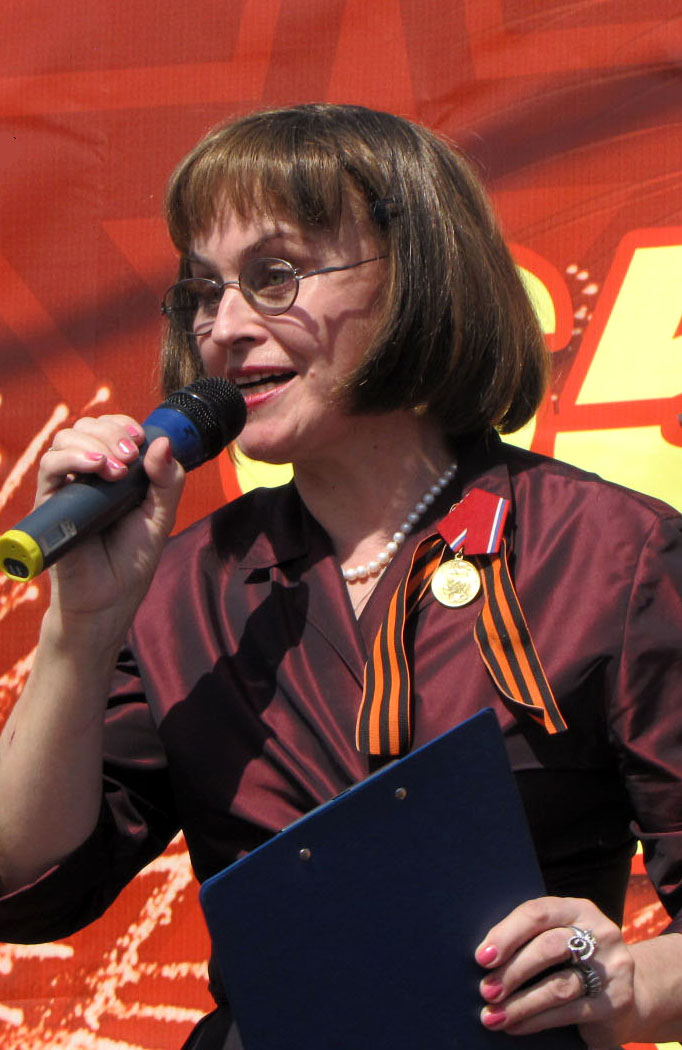
- Alla Danko in 2010
- Born: 15 March 1946; Moscow, RSFSR, Soviet Union
- Citizenship: Russia
- Education: First Moscow State Medical University
- Occupations: TV presenter, journalist
- Known for: Announcer of the Soviet Central Television
- Awards: Medal of the Order "For Merit to the Fatherland", Medal "In Commemoration of the 850th Anniversary of Moscow"

Alla Georgievna Danko (Russian: А́лла Гео́ргиевна Данько́; born 15 March 1946, Moscow) is a Russian TV presenter, journalist, and former announcer of Soviet Central Television.

== Biography ==
Her father worked in television and her mother a linguist.

Graduated I.M. Sechenov First Moscow State Medical University, then - clinical residency on "occupational diseases of the nervous system"; worked as a junior researcher.

Since 1975, successfully passed a competition for the position of speaker, began to work on the Central Television in the TV company Ostankino: led information, music, sports programs (Morning, Vremya, Moscow News, Good Evening, Moscow, Mom's School, What Are Your Names, and others).

Since 1995 to 2000 - chief editor, assistant producer music service Channel One Russia.

Subsequently, she worked on the channels of TV Center, REN TV, REN TV.

Currently, the general director of Dankoproduction. She teaches at the Higher National School of television.

== Awards ==
- Honoured Artist of Russia
- Medal "In Commemoration of the 850th Anniversary of Moscow" (1997)
