= Vesti (VGTRK) =

Russian TV news program

- Genre: News
- Created by: Oleg Dobrodeyev; Yevgeny Kiselyov; Anatoly Lysenko; Oleg Poptsov
- Country of origin: Russia
- Original language: Russian

Production
- Production company: VGTRK

Original release
- Network: Russia-1
- Release: 13 May 1991

Related
- Novosti, Vremya

Vesti (Russian: Вести, lit. "News") is a brand used by the Russian broadcaster VGTRK and the regional GTRKs for their television, radio, and online news services.

== History ==
Logo of the Vesti program 2002-2010

The very first edition of Vesti went on air on 13 May 1991 at 17:00. With that, the RTV channel began its broadcast, now known as Russia-1. From May 14, Vesti began broadcasting 15 minutes-long editions at 20:00 and 23:00. Compared to Vremya, Vesti was innovative in terms of news presentation. For the first months of broadcast it was an opposition media, supportive of Boris Yeltsin and the Democratic Russia party. After the August coup and breakup of the Soviet Union, Vesti turned into official news bulletin of the new, post-Soviet Russia. The program was later extended to 50 minutes in 2002 due to the now called Telekanal Rossiya now airing a children’s program Spokoynoy nochi, malyshi at 20.50 (due to the fact that Channel One no longer airs it), and Vesti’s logo is inspired by the BBC. Vesti now airs at a full hour at 20.00.

March 4, 2019, the local edition of "Vesti" will be added at 9:00, And local branch stations broadcast the dialect version of "Vesti".

== Editions ==
- 8:00 (Region, Saturday - Sunday)
- 9:00 (Region, Monday - Friday)
- 11:00
- 14:00
- 16:00 (Monday - Friday)
- 17:00 (Saturday - Sunday)
- 20:00 (Monday - Saturday)
- Vesti Nedeli ("News of the Week", 20:00 Sunday)

== Hosts ==
=== Current ===
- Igor Kozhevin
- Ernest Mackevičius
- Yevgeny Rozhkov
- Maria Sittel
- Denis Polunchiukov
- Dmitry Kiselyov (Sundays)

=== Former ===
- Sergey Dorenko†
- Vladislav Flyarkovsky
- Aleksandr Gurnov
- Marina Kim
- Yevgeny Kiselyov
- Nelly Petkova
- Yevgeny Popov
- Yevgeny Revenko
- Arina Sharapova
- Svetlana Sorokina
- Konstantin Syomin

== See also ==
- Vremya
- Vesti FM
