= Vladimir Danchev =

Soviet newscaster

Vladimir Danchev (Russian: Владимир Данчев, born 1948) is a former Russian newscaster at the foreign broadcasting service of Soviet radio in Moscow, who changed the English texts he was given to read in 1983, to express support for the Afghan people in their resistance to Soviet armed forces in their country. His activities, which began in February 1983, were not covered until the BBC and other Western media reported his actions in May that year.

His case was then followed throughout 1983 by the fortnightly USSR News Brief bulletin.

Of mixed Russian-Bulgarian descent, Danchev refused to repent his actions and was subsequently sent to a psychiatric hospital in Tashkent, the city where he had grown up. He was released from the hospital that autumn, according to his employers at Radio Moscow, and returned to work in December 1983 by which time all broadcasts were pre-recorded.

According to Noam Chomsky and other commentators, Danchev's principal transgression was to embarrass the Soviet government by describing the presence of Soviet forces in Afghanistan as an "invasion". According to official ideology, the USSR had not invaded Afghanistan in December 1979. It was defending the Afghan people against "terrorists funded by foreign sources": this was how the USSR referred to the Mujahedin and their backers in the CIA and Saudi Arabia.

Danchev was praised at the time in the U.S. media as a hero of free speech and free thought and in 1991 the International Federation of Human Rights inaugurated an award for journalists in his name.

== See also ==
- Liz Wahl
- Marina Ovsyannikova
