= Nasha Versia =

- Type: Daily newspaper
- Format: A3 per spread
- Owner: Vyacheslav Kalinin
- Editor: Ruslan Gorevoy
- Founded: 1998
- Political alignment: independent
- Headquarters: Moscow, Russia, 1905 goda str. d7 str1
- Circulation: 170,000
- Website: http://www.versia.ru/

Nasha Versija ("Our Version") is a Moscow-based Russian weekly tabloid founded in 1998 by Artyom Borovik, nowadays owned by Vyacheslav Kalinin. Weekly print circulation of 170 000 in March 2017. The newspaper adheres to the generally accepted standards of investigative journalism.

In 2005 the newspaper received a new logo Nasha Versija (previous – Versija). The same year, Rodionov publishing house tried to buy a popular newspaper from Veronika Borovik-Khiltchevskaya, Borovik's widow, but the ownership finally changed in 2007. The new owner became Nikolai Zyatkov. Since then newspaper changed ownership till it was finally acquired by Vyacheslav Kalinin in 2025.

Those who worked and contributed to Nasha Versia:

Leonid Radzikhovsky - a political analyst and independent journalist, Orkhan Jamal – prominent investigative journalist, Rustam Arifdjanov – second after Artyom Borovik editor-in-chief, nowadays representative of the Council of Elders of the Federal National-Cultural Autonomy of Azerbaijanis of Russia, Oleg Lurje – investigative journalist, author of scandalous publications about the activities of the Bank of New York, Mabetex and Roman Abramovich. Konstantin Zyatkov - CEO and editor-in-chief, Alexander Sinistchuk is the editor-in-chief of printed edition since May 2013, Ruslan Gorevoy - columnist, observer and since January 2025 editor-in-chief.

Nasha Versija has a number of regional joint projects:

- Nasha Versia on the Neva - regional publishing project in Saint Petersburg,
- Nasha Versia in Saratov,
- Nasha Versia in the Republic of Bashkortostan
