= Nonna Bodrova =

Russian news presenter (1928–2009)

- Nonna Bodrova in 1971
- Born: Nonna Viktorovna Bodrova; December 13, 1928; Leningrad, Russian SFSR, Soviet Union
- Died: January 31, 2009 (aged 80); Moscow, Russia
- Occupation: Journalist

Nonna Viktorovna Bodrova (Russian: Но́нна Ви́кторовна Бодро́ва; 17 December 1928, Leningrad, USSR – 31 January 2009, Moscow, Russia) was a Soviet TV presenter, an Honored Artist of the RSFSR (1972), and a laureate of the USSR State Prize (1977). She was one of the first newscasters of the Soviet Central Television and was an announcer of the news program Vremya.

== Early life and education ==
Nonna Viktorovna Bodrova was born on 17 December 1928 in the city of Leningrad. She graduated from the Moscow Art Theater School in 1956.

== Career ==
She began working for the Soviet Central Television immediately after graduation. She, along with Igor Kirillov, co-anchored the news program Vremya and was the news frontman of the Soviet Union's state-owned network for all of the nation's pivotal events since the 1950s, covering the annual celebrations of state occasions.

== Personal life ==
She was married to Boris Bodrov and had only one child, Boris.

== Death ==
Bodrova died on 31 January 2009 from lung disease. Her remains were buried on Troyekurovskoye Cemetery, Moscow, Russia.

== Legacy and honors ==
Angelina Vovk, a TV presenter and People's Artist of the Russian Federation commented that Bodrova was "always collected, very strict, rarely smiled, but when she smiled, it was a very kind smile. She was entirely devoted to her work. She had two purposes in life - her family, and her work in the media".

Bodrova was an Honored Artist of the RSFSR. She was also a recipient of USSR State Prize.
