= Nelly Petkova (journalist) =

Russian journalist (born 1960)

- Нелли Петкова
- Born: Nelly Olegovna Petkova; 10 March 1960 (age 66); Vladivostok, Russian SFSR, Soviet Union
- Occupation: Journalist
- Years active: 1983–present
- Children: 1

Nelly Olegovna Petkova (Russian: Нелли Олеговна Петкова; born 10 March 1960) is a Russian journalist. She has presented the Vremya (ORT), Federation and the morning edition of Vesti (Russia-1) news programmes in the 1990s. Petkova made her last on-screen appearance in 1998 and worked as Deputy Director of Information Broadcasting at VGTRK. She has been the head of the External Communications Department at the Interstate Fund for Humanitarian Cooperation of the CIS Member States since 2014.

== Biography ==
Petkova was born to a border guard officer at Vladivostok on 10 March 1960. She studied at a physics and mathematics school and a music school majoring in piano. In 1982, Petkova graduated from the philological faculty of Kaliningrad State University with a philology degree. A year later, she began working in television in Kaliningrad and Magadan. Petkova began working on Russian television as a news presenter in 1990. From 1991 to 1996, she was a presenter of the Vremya news bulletin on ORT in Moscow. Petkova reported on the assassination of Vladislav Listyev, the Chechen–Russian conflict and president Boris Yeltsin's heart surgery among others. In 1994, she had a role in the television series Goryachev i drugie and was in the film Poyezd do Bruklina in 1995.

From 1996 to 1998, she was the Deputy Directorate of Information Programs of the Russia-1 channel and was the presenter of the news programmes Federation and the morning edition of Vesti after receiving an invite. Petkova made her last on-screen appearance in 1998 and became Deputy Director of Information Broadcasting at VGTRK from 1998 to 2000, working as the producer of the information service of Channel One Worldwide. She later graduated from the Russian Presidential Academy of Public Administration in 2001, defending her Doctor of Philosophy in her Candidate of Political Sciences and a lecture on information policy. Petkova had experience in a public relations agency and in intercultural dialogue organisations.

She led the press service of the Central Election Commission of the Unity Party from 2000 to 2002 and was vice-president of public relations at IMA Group LLC from 2002 to 2006, also working as a senior lecturer in the Information Policy Department at the Russian Academy of State Service. Petkova later became General Director of the Center for Communication Technologies, LLC between 2006 and 2014, promoting Russian literature and book publishing. She was an educator at the Russian Presidential Academy of National Economy and Public Administration in the Department of Information Policy. Since 2014, Petkova has been the head of the External Communications Department at the Interstate Fund for Humanitarian Cooperation of the CIS Member States. She is the teacher of courses such as Professional Ethics of Journalists.

== Personal life ==
She is married to the CEO of a television series production company. They have one child.

== Awards ==
Petkova is a recipient of the Golden Pen of Russia from the FSB Border Service of Russia, the Medal "In Commemoration of the 850th Anniversary of Moscow" and the Russian Federation Presidential Certificate of Honour. She also has Certificates of Honour from the Federal Agency for Press and Mass Media, the Minkomsvyaz and the Federation Council.
