= Tatyana Sudets =

- Born: 22 August 1947 (age 79); Moscow, Russian SFSR, Soviet Union
- Education: Moscow Power Engineering Institute

Tatyana Alexandrovna Sudets (Russian: Татья́на Алекса́ндровна Суде́ц; first marriage — Grushina, née — Burantseva) (born August 22, 1947 in Moscow) is a Soviet and Russian TV presenter and television announcer. She was recognised as a Merited Artist of the Russian Federation in 2000.

== Biography ==
Tatyana was born in Moscow, August 22, 1947. She graduated from the Moscow Power Engineering Institute.

In 1972 he came to the Soviet Central Television. Has been leading the program Vremya, Little Blue Light, Skillful Hands, Pesnya goda, Good Night, Little Ones!.

In the years of perestroika went to Central Television switched to cable, led a variety of concerts.

=== Personal life ===
- Her first husband — Anatoly Grushin (1965-1972), Research Fellow
  - Son — Andrey (killed in 1992)
- Second husband (from 1978 to 1985) — a military translator Vladimir, the son of Air Marshal Vladimir Sudets;
  - Daughter — Darya
    - Grandson — Kirill (2006)
    - Granddaughter — Anna (2010)
- Third husband — KGB colonel Mikhail Miroshnikov (1988 to 1995)
