= Vremya =

Russian newscast

- Logo since 2018
- Genre: News; Current affairs
- Presented by: See Presenters below
- Opening theme: Theme from film "Galya" by Nikita Bogoslovskiy (1970–1979), Rodina (1979-1980), Patrioticheskaya Pesnya by Mikhail Glinka (1984–1986), Time, Forward! by Georgy Sviridov
- Countries of origin: Soviet Union (1968–1991); Russia (1994–present)
- Original language: Russian

Production
- Production locations: Ostankino Technical Center, Moscow, Russia
- Camera setup: Multi-camera
- Running time: 30 minutes to 1 hour (general); 1 hour to 1 hour 30 minutes (Sunday edition)
- Production company: Channel One Russia

Original release
- Network: Soviet Programme One (1968–1991); Channel One (1994–present)
- Release: 1 January 1968 – 27 August 1991 (Soviet Union); 16 December 1994 – present (Russia)

Related
- RT News, Vesti, Novosti

Vremya (Russian: Вре́мя, lit. 'Time'; pronounced [ˈvrʲemʲə]) is the main evening newscast in Russia, airing on Channel One Russia (Первый канал, Pervy kanal) and previously on Programme One of the Central Television of the USSR (CT USSR; Russian: Центральное телевидение СССР, ЦТ СССР). The programme has been on the air since 1 January 1968 (there were no broadcasts from August 1991 to December 1994) and has broadcast in color since 1974.

== Editorial line ==
During the lifespan of the Soviet Union,Vremya had a pro-government bias and typically did not report on news that could potentially fuel anti-government sentiment. The programme promoted socialism. The newsroom was tied to the Politburo of the Communist Party of the Soviet Union's Central Committee. This situation changed after Glasnost, when a director of news was introduced alongside the news being sourced from official outlets. This made CT USSR report accurately on the collapse of the governments of the Soviet Union's communist allies in Eastern Europe in 1989. This also allowed Vremya to be shown uncensored and critical, triggering the protests that hastened the end of the Soviet Union.

In the Russian Federation era, Vremya became a "flagship propaganda outlet" of the government. Reporting during the 2022 Russian invasion of Ukraine featured the Kremlin's messaging, and, at the same time, independent news outlets were curtailed.

== Schedule and popularity ==
Vremya ordinarily airs on television at 9:00 PM local time throughout Russia. To accomplish this, Channel One broadcasts eleven separate feeds of its schedule, one for each of the eleven time zones of Russia. Multiple editions of the newscast are produced live from Moscow throughout the day, ensuring the content is up-to-date by the time it airs in each individual time zone.

During the Soviet era, the programme's main edition was also carried simultaneously on the primary channel of each republican station: AzTV, Belarus 1, Eesti Televisioon, Georgian Public Broadcasting, Kazakhstan-1, Channel 1 of the Kiev Telecentre, LTV1, Lithuanian National Radio and Television, Uzbekistan 1, etc. The program was also simulcast in autonomous republics as well. Since its premier in 1968, Vremya has been aired via satellite.

The broadcast lasts 30 minutes, but in special circumstances (more ubiquitous during the Soviet era), the broadcast was extended beyond the 30 minutes allotted when necessary (such as the Red Square state ceremonies and parades, CPSU Party Congress telecasts together with other CPSU-led activities, plenary sessions of the Supreme Soviet of the USSR, and the deaths of Soviet leaders Leonid Brezhnev, Yuri Andropov and Konstantin Chernenko). Even highlights of the celebrations of the Union-wide holidays were also broadcast.

Starting in the mid-1970s, another 30-minute late edition was presented on the All-Union Programme (launched in 1956) around 11:00 PM (this was in the form of a live simulcast of Vremya in the next Orbita transmission zone, occasionally a repeat of the 9:00 PM programme, especially in the European USSR). Prior to that, both channels aired Vremya simultaneously at 9:00 PM, whereupon a replay broadcast would be aired the next morning when the First Programme signed on around 7:30 AM (later 6:30 AM) after the exercise programme. This was succeeded by children's programming and schools and colleges programmes, all produced in collaboration with the USSR Ministry of Education and were also seen on Programme 4. Later, a live morning edition was shown at 6:30 AM, before the breakfast programme 120 minut (which continues today on Channel One Russia as Dobroye Utro, Russian: Доброе утро) on weekdays (on weekends a morning edition of Vremya aired at 8:00 AM after sign-on).

News summaries were added as the transmissions increased during the day. There was a bulletin at the end of the morning and midday programmes (i.e. around 1:00 PM), an afternoon edition at 3:00 PM, and another at 6:30 PM on the first channel. From 1989, the latter bulletin began to use the two presenter format of Vremya, as well as the Vremya moniker, and its corresponding studio and graphics (including the title sequence and theme music), looking as it was the program's first edition (the 6:30 AM program was the morning news edition while the one at 1 PM was the midday update), with the 9:00 PM telecast serving as the second (main) edition, and the one at 11:00 PM as the third or late edition or the late night replay. The All-Union Programme's daytime schedule always began with the news at around 15:00. Midnight newscasts did not appear until the 1980s, when the First Programme screened a headline update preceding the closedown sequence, usually after midnight. All of these bulletins were known as Novosti (Russian: Новости, "The News"). From 1989, the 15:00 news round-up on the All-Union Programme and the midnight news round-up on the First Programme were known as TSN: Television News Service (Russian: TCH: Телевизионная служба новостей, TSN:Televizionnaya sluzhba novostey), which ended in 1991. Today the news on Channel One Russia follows a similar schedule to this one, with Vremya, Novosti, and the all-Russian and regional news updates.

Between 1980 and 1984, and since 1986, Vremya has used the iconic theme song from Time, Forward! as its signature tune and opening sequence. The French song Manchester et Liverpool of Marie Laforêt was used as the background music that was heard during the weather forecast from 1968 to 1981. After 1985, various songs were used alternatively, but Train at 1:30 and Mikhaela of Anatol Chiriac were the most regularly used background music songs for the weather forecast of Vremya. Until 1991, the weather forecast featured a sequence of photos from various republics of the USSR and during their photos the temperature and weather conditions in each republic was shown, while one of the above songs (like Train at 1:30 and Mikhaela from the mid eighties and after) was used as the background music throughout the weather forecast.

In a two-week test that lasted from 12 to 23 February 1990, more than 100 PBS member stations across the United States broadcast Vremya. The test was coordinated by WGBH-TV. The test was then extended for another two weeks, but was not carried by all of the same stations.

== Coverage during the last days of the USSR ==
After the introduction of glasnost and perestroika, Vremya loosened its fidelity to the party line and began presenting reports about the events plaguing Eastern Europe at the time with more candour. On 15 March 1989, 150 million Soviet citizens watched as the station aired an 85-page speech by Gorbachev to a plenum of the CPSU Central Committee criticizing the poor state of agriculture and setting out the case for reforms, the highlights of that address being featured on that day's telecast.

In the 1980s, 86% of Soviet adults relied on television coverage as their primary source of news. However, Vremya was seen as "a joke" by many Soviet citizens due to its poor coverage of news events. The coverage of the Chernobyl nuclear disaster, for example, was often relegated to lesser news items during the ongoing coverage of the disaster; in contrast, western news media such as CBS Evening News led with the story for six consecutive weekdays. Following the evacuation of the nuclear workers' closed city of Pripyat, Vremya issued the following brief announcement:

There has been an accident at the Chernobyl Nuclear Power Plant. One of the nuclear reactors was damaged. The effects of the accident are being remedied. Assistance has been provided for any affected people. An investigative commission has been set up.

— Vremya, 28 April 1986, 21:00

In 1987, the program logo appeared for the first time in its studio. 1988 saw a big change for the newscast as its studios featured picture backdrops for the first time, and debuted a new logo, with a styled letter В in a box (this was the year of its 20th anniversary). On 19 August 1991 it showed pictures of the impending coup d'etat in Moscow for the first time, albeit in the new styled studios which opened in 1990.

Vremya covered highlights of the March 1989 elections for the Congress of People's Deputies of the Soviet Union and the sessions of the Congress in Moscow, making interviews with its leadership and deputies.

== Transition ==
The last Soviet-era Vremya newscast was broadcast on 27 August 1991 and replaced with another news programme known as TV-Inform (ru: ТВ-Информ) the following day. The closure was owing to pressure from RSFSR President Boris Yeltsin, claiming that the programme was "too tied to the CPSU", but according to the news anchors themselves it was due to CT USSR being forced to lay off a large number of their staff who were conjectured to be KGB agents. When the USSR dissolved in December that year, the programme, now Novosti Ostankino, changed broadcasters from Soviet Central Television to the new 1st channel Ostankino and 4th channel Ostankino. During the network's name change to ORT-1 (Public Russian Television-1, Russian: Общественное Российское Телевидение) in April 1995, and Ostankino 4's earlier 1994 reformatting into NTV, the newscast was integrated as part of the Novosti ITA brand of newscasts with the 9pm edition being the flagship.

Vremya resumed broadcasting on 16 December 1994, in time to report on the looming conflict in Chechenya. The format was then changed to that of a single-presenter one, but the dual-presenter one was kept for special editions of the program, and was even incorporated into the newscast's 1995-99 opening sequence. Special New Year's Day openers debuted in 1998, in celebration of the program's 30th anniversary.

On 1 January 2018, the program celebrated its 50th anniversary. Russian President Vladimir Putin visited the studio and congratulated the staff for the occasion.

== Sunday Vremya ==
On Sundays since the late 1980s, the programme also has a separate Sunday edition, initially called Seven Days (Семь дней, Sem' dney), since 2003 known as Sunday Vremya (Воскресное Время, Voskresnoe Vremya, Sunday Time). This programme also airs a roundup of the week's news. Until its launch, Vremya was shown as per Monday-Saturday. Sunday Vremya debuted on the then Programme One of Soviet Central Television in 1989.

== 2022 anti-war protest ==
During a live Vremya broadcast related to the Russo-Ukrainian war, on 14 March 2022, employee Marina Ovsyannikova appeared behind the news anchor, Ekaterina Andreeva, holding a poster, made visible to millions of viewers, which stated, in a mix of Russian and English:

No War
Остановите войну, не верьте пропаганде, здесь вам врут.
[Stop the war, don't believe the propaganda, here you are being lied to.]
Russians against war

== Presenters ==
=== Soviet-era edition ===
- Vera Shebeko
- Igor Kirillov† - chief presenter until the 1980s, reporting on major events such as the Red Square ceremonies and overseas visits of the Soviet leader
- Maya Sidrova
- Evgeny Suslov
- Gennady Chetrov
- Evgeny Kochergin
- Inna Ermilova
- Elena Kovalenko
- Anna Shatilova
- Yuri Kovelenov
- Tatyana Sudets
- Victor Balashov†
- Aza Lihitchenko
- Galina Zimenkova
- Nonna Bodrova†
- Sergey Medvedev
- Leonid Elin
- Igor Fesunenko†

=== Russian Federation-era edition ===
- Nelly Petkova 1991–1996
- Igor Vykhuholev: 1994–2003
- Tatiana Komarova: 1994–1995
- Igor Gmyza: 1995–1999
- Alexandra Buratayeva: 1995–1999
- Alexandr Panov: 1995-1996
- Arina Sharapova: 1996–1998
- Sergey Dorenko†: 1996–1999 (Information-analytic programme "VREMYA with Sergey Dorenko")
- Kirill Kleimyonov: 1998–2005, 2018–2020
- Zhanna Agalakova: 1998–2007
- Pavel Sheremet†: 1999–2001 (Information-analytic programme "VREMYA", Saturday)
- Andrey Baturin: 2003–2005: ("VREMYA" at night, literally "Night time")
- Pyotr Marchenko: 2003–2005
- Olga Kokorekina: 2007–2008
- Pyotr Tolstoy 2005–2012 (Information-analytic programme "Sunday VREMYA")
- Maxim Sharafutdinov: 2007–? (Summer releases to the Far East and Siberia + CIS and other countries)
- Dmitry Borisov: 2011–2017
- Irada Zeinalova: 2012–2016 (Information-analytic programme "Sunday VREMYA")
- Valery Fadeyev: 2016–2018 (Information-analytic programme "Sunday VREMYA")

=== Current presenters ===
- Ekaterina Andreeva: 1997–present
- Mikhail Leontyev: 1999–present
- Vitaly Eliseyev: 2007–present
- Andrei Ukharev: 2018–present (Information-analytic programme "Sunday VREMYA")
- Ekaterina Berezovskaya: 2020–present (Information-analytic programme "Sunday VREMYA")

== Similar newscasts in other socialist countries ==
- Aktuelle Kamera (1952) – Deutscher Fernsehfunk – East Germany
- Dziennik Telewizyjny (1958) – TVP – Poland
- Televizní Noviny (1958) – ČST – Czechoslovakia (continues today on TV Nova within the Czech Republic only, 1994-)
- Híradó (1957) – Magyar Televízió – Hungary
- Panorama (Панорама, 1968) – BNT – Bulgaria
- Po sveta i u nas (По света и у нас, 1960) – BNT – Bulgaria
- Telejurnal (1966) – TVR – Romania
- Dnevnik (Дневник, 1959) – JRT – Yugoslavia
- Revista Televizive - RTSH - Albania
- Xinwen Lianbo (Broadcast News, 新闻联播, 1978) – CCTV – People's Republic of China
- Podo (Report, 보도) – Korean Central Television – North Korea
- Noticiero Nacional de la Televisión Cubana (1961) – Cubavision – Cuba
- Thời sự (Current Events, 1971) Vietnam Television - Vietnam

== See also ==
- Marina Ovsyannikova
