= Svetlana Sorokina =

Russian journalist (born 1957)

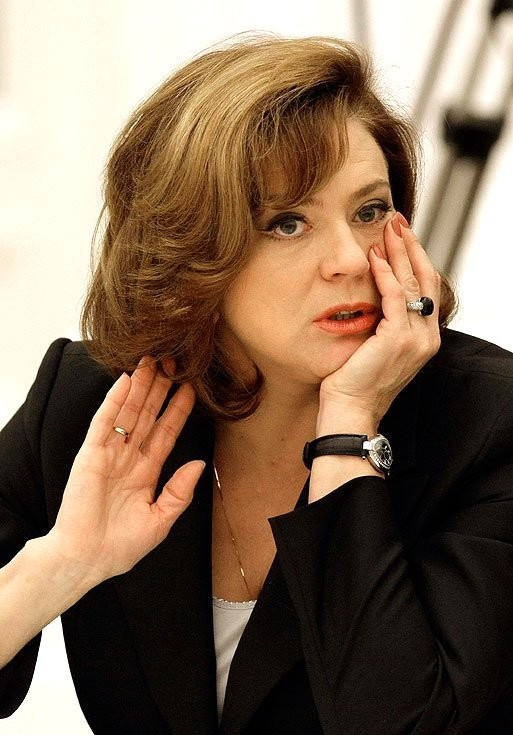
- Born: 15 January 1957 (age 69); Pushkin, Saint Petersburg, Russian SFSR, USSR
- Education: Saint Petersburg State Forestry University

Svetlana Innokentyevna Sorokina (Russian: Светла́на Инноке́нтьевна Соро́кина; née Sarykova; born 15 January 1957, Pushkin) is a Russian journalist, member of the Russian Television Academy, teacher at the Higher School of Economics, and a former member of the Presidential Council for Civil Society and Human Rights (2009–2011).

== Career ==
Sorokina was born on 15 January 1957.

In 1987, she was included in the staff of the Leningrad television in 1988–1990 leading the program 600 seconds.

She worked at the All-Russia State Television and Radio Broadcasting Company, NTV, TV-6, Channel One Russia and other.

From September 2005 onward—along with Yuri Kobaladze from September 2006—co-hosts a weekly radio show In a circle of light on the Echo of Moscow station.

From April to December 2015 hosted a talk show Sorokina on the TV Rain channel.

== Personal life ==
- Single. Kept her husband's surname from the first marriage—her maiden name is Sarykova. Her second husband was a television operator Vladimir Grechishkin.
- In July 2003, she became the foster mother of daughter Tonya.

== Awards ==
- Awarded the Order "For Personal Courage" (1993)
- A three-time winner of TEFI (1996, 2000, 2005)
