= Ekaterina Berezovskaya =

Russian TV personality (born 1990)

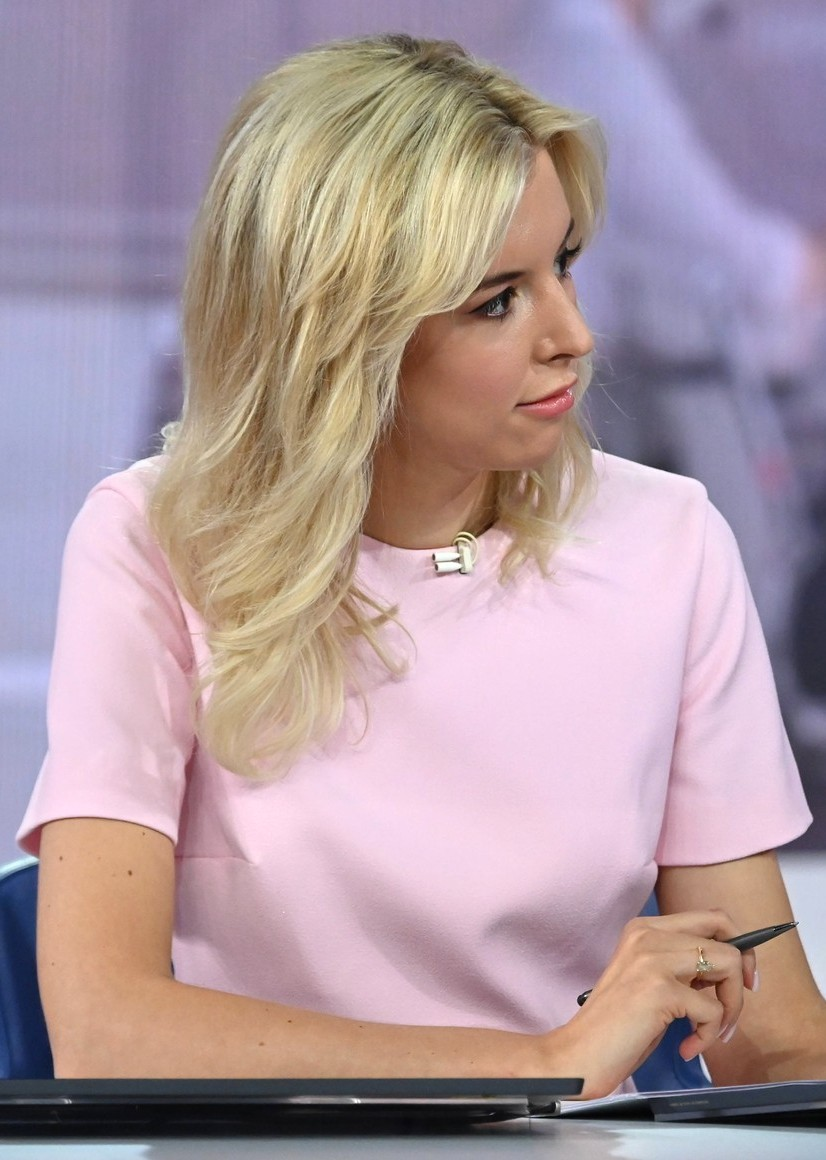
- Berezovskaya in 2021
- Born: Ekaterina Vladimirovna Berezovskaya; 4 February 1990 (age 36); Moscow, RSFSR, Soviet Union
- Education: MGIMO
- Occupations: announcer, TV presenter

Ekaterina Vladimirovna Berezovskaya (Russian: Екатери́на Влади́мировна Березо́вская; born February 4, 1990) is a Russian journalist and TV presenter. Best known for her work at the Channel One Russia.

== Biography ==
She was born on February 4, 1990, in Moscow.

In 2012 Berezovskaya graduated from MGIMO (Faculty of International Journalism).

During her studies, from 2010 to 2011 she worked as a correspondent in the information service of the REN TV channel, from December 2011 to January 2014 at Russia 24. From January 2014 to June 2016 he was a correspondent for Channel One Russia. From August to December 2016, she hosted the morning news broadcasts (weekly with Yuri Lipatov).

On January 23, 2017, Berezovskaya became the host of news broadcasts at 9:00, 10:00, 12:00 and 15:00.

On July 8, 2017, she hosted an unscheduled news release in connection with the participation of Vladimir Putin at the 2017 G20 Hamburg summit.

In March 2020, she made her debut as the host of the newscast Vremya.

In 2021, Berezovskaya was the host of the Direct Line with Vladimir Putin.

== Sanctions ==
Berezovskaya was sanctioned by the Ukrainian government on 15 January 2023, amid the Russian invasion of Ukraine.
