= Vera Shebeko =

Soviet journalist (born 1938)

- Born: Vera Alekseyevna Shebeko; July 10, 1938 (age 87); Smorodnika, Krupki Raion, Minsk Oblast, BSSR
- Occupation: News presenter
- Known for: Vremya
- Television: Soviet Central Television
- Children: Yuri Mshetsyan (Melisov)

Vera Alekseyevna Shebeko (Russian: Вера Алексеевна Шебеко; born 10 July 1938) is a former Russian anchorwoman for Soviet Central Television and host of the channel's main editorial program Novosti.

== Biography ==
In 1965, Shebeko graduated from the Russian language and literature faculty of the Belarusian State University, working as a newsreader for radio stations in Belarus after graduation. She was hired by Soviet Central TV in 1971 in the editorial department; she later became the head anchor of the popular news program Vremya (Russian: Время), as well as appearing on other programs. She was a member of the Communist Party of the Soviet Union until 1990.

In the post-Soviet era was a teacher of speech on the NTV channel and NTV Plus, several years worked with the staff of these channels.

Her son, Yuri Mshetsyan (Melisov), is a guitarist with the Russian rock group Epidemia (Russian: Эпидемия).

== Awards ==
- Honored Artist of the RSFSR
- Order of the Badge of Honour
