= Igor Kirillov =

Russian–Soviet television presenter and announcer (1932–2021)

- Игорь Кириллов
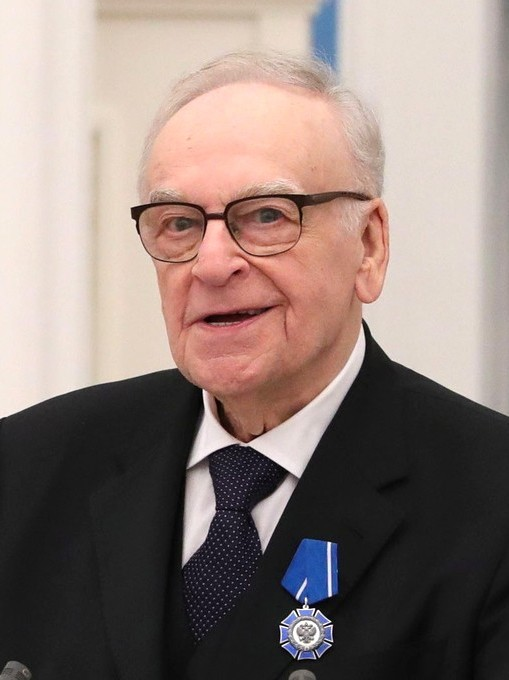
- Kirillov in 2018
- Born: Igor Leonidovich Kirillov; 14 September 1932; Moscow, Soviet Union
- Died: 29 October 2021 (aged 89); Moscow, Russia
- Occupations: Announcer, TV presenter, radio host, TV journalist
- Years active: 1955–2021
- Spouses: Irina (d. 2004); Tatyana
- Children: 2

Igor Leonidovich Kirillov (Russian: Игорь Леонидович Кириллов; 14 September 1932 – 29 October 2021) was a Soviet and Russian news presenter, announcer and actor.

He was a news anchor for Soviet Central Television (CT USSR) and announcer for the CT USSR news program Vremya for 30 years. He was awarded the People's Artist of the USSR in 1988.

== Early life and education ==
Kirillov was born in Moscow. His father, Leonid Mikhailovich Kirillov (1904–1979), was an engineer, and his mother, Revekka Veniaminovna Kirillova (1902–1995), was a librarian. He planned to become a director, but was admitted to the Gerasimov Institute of Cinematography to study acting. He left after one year and graduated from the Mikhail Shchepkin Higher Theatre School.

== Career ==
After graduation, he worked at the Moscow Drama and Comedy Theatre. Two years later, in 1957, he won an audition to become a newsreader for Soviet Central Television. For 30 years he co-anchored the network's prime time news broadcast Vremya, with Nonna Bodrova and Anna Shatilova as co-anchors during his tenure. He was known for his slow delivery, which he told an interviewer was a Russian preference, and also said was for the benefit of Soviet citizens with native languages other than Russian. During his tenure, Kirillov was the anchor for all of the Soviet Union's pivotal events, covering the annual celebrations of state occasions, the death and state funeral of Leonid Brezhnev and his successors Yuri Andropov and Konstantin Chernenko, and as well as Yuri Gagarin's orbit of the earth in 1961, the Soviet government's decision to invade Afghanistan in 1979, and the Moscow Olympics the following year. Kirillov also accompanied Soviet leaders on their official visits to foreign countries to report on location.

He also made cameo appearances in some Russian films, and in Sting's 1985 hit "Russians", and was host of the Russian TV pop music show and the annual Песня года (Song of the Year). He retired as a newsreader in 1988, joining CT USSR (later Ostankino TV, then ORT). He retired in 1996, but he occasionally appeared as an emcee for some concerts and the annual Red Square Victory Day parade.

== Personal life and death ==
He married his first wife, Irina Vsevolodovna Kirillova, a sound engineer, while they were both students; she died in 2004. Their daughter, Anna, is a professional pianist; their son died in 2011. He nursed his wife's sister, Natalya, during a two-year illness that ended with her death also in 2011. He later remarried to Tatyana Aleksandrovna Kirillova.

Kirillov died on 29 October 2021, at the age of 89, the last surviving news announcer to have been made a People's Artist of the USSR. He had been hospitalized for circulatory problems in September and died after contracting COVID-19.

== Awards and honours ==
- Honored Artist of the RSFSR (1968)
- USSR State Prize (1977)
- Order of Friendship of Peoples (1980)
- People's Artist of the RSFSR (1982)
- People's Artist of the USSR (1988)
- Order "For Merit to the Fatherland", 4th class (2006)
- Order "For Merit to the Fatherland", 3rd class (2011)
- Order of Honour (2018)
- Order of the Red Banner of Labour
- Medal "In Commemoration of the 850th Anniversary of Moscow"
