= Igor Gmyza =

Russian radio and TV presenter (born 1965)

Igor Gennadyevich Gmyza (Russian: Игорь Геннадьевич Гмы́за; born January 12, 1965, in Minsk) is a Russian radio and TV presenter. In 1995–2004 he was the host of the news program on the Public Russian Television (ORT, now Channel One). From 2006 to 2016 he was a political commentator on Radio Rossii. Currently, he is a teacher at the Higher school of television of Moscow State University.

He is married and has a son Nikita.
