= Kirill Kleimyonov =

- Кирилл Клеймёнов
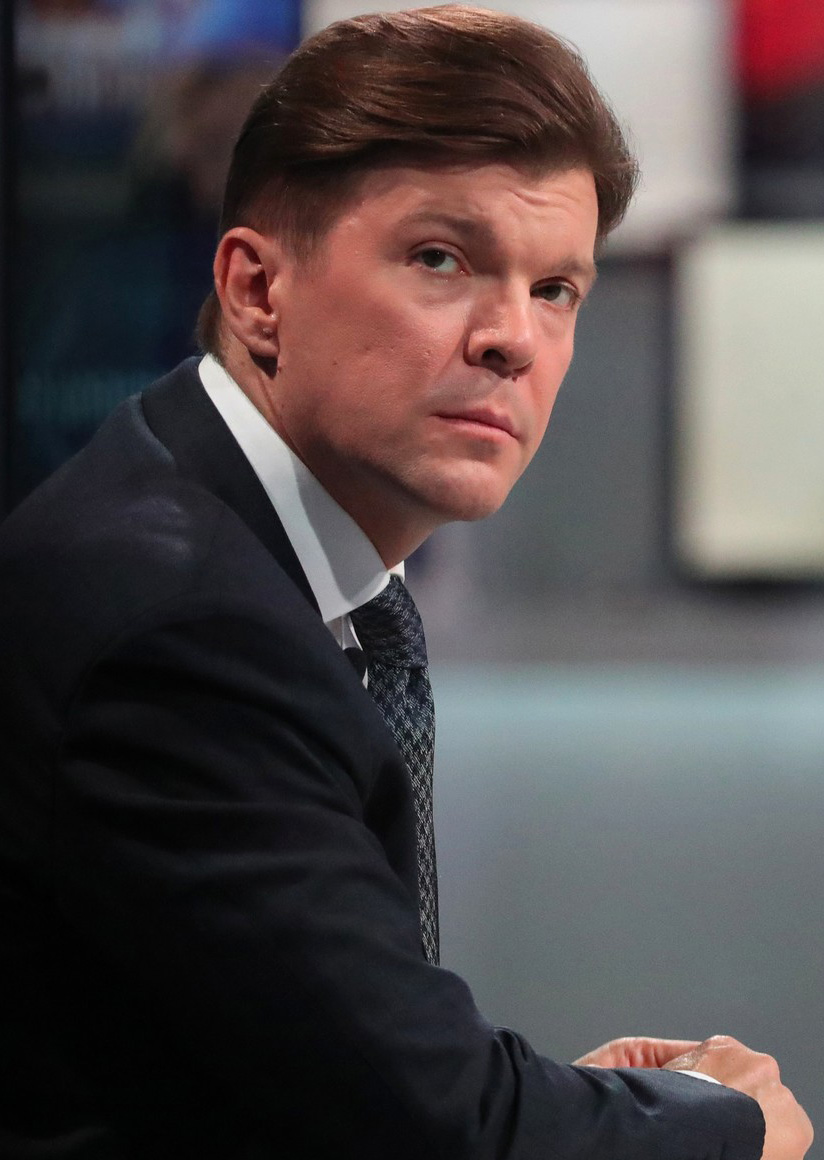
- Kleimyonov in 2018
- Born: 20 September 1972 (age 53); Moscow, RSFSR, USSR
- Education: Moscow State University
- Employer: Channel One
- Awards: Order "For Merit to the Fatherland"; Order of Honour; Order of Friendship; Presidential Certificate of Honour

Kirill Alekseevich Kleimyonov (Russian: Кири́лл Алексе́евич Клеймёнов; born 20 September 1972, Moscow) is a Russian journalist, broadcaster, Deputy General Director — Head of the Directorate of Information Programs — a member of the Board of Directors of the Channel One Russia.

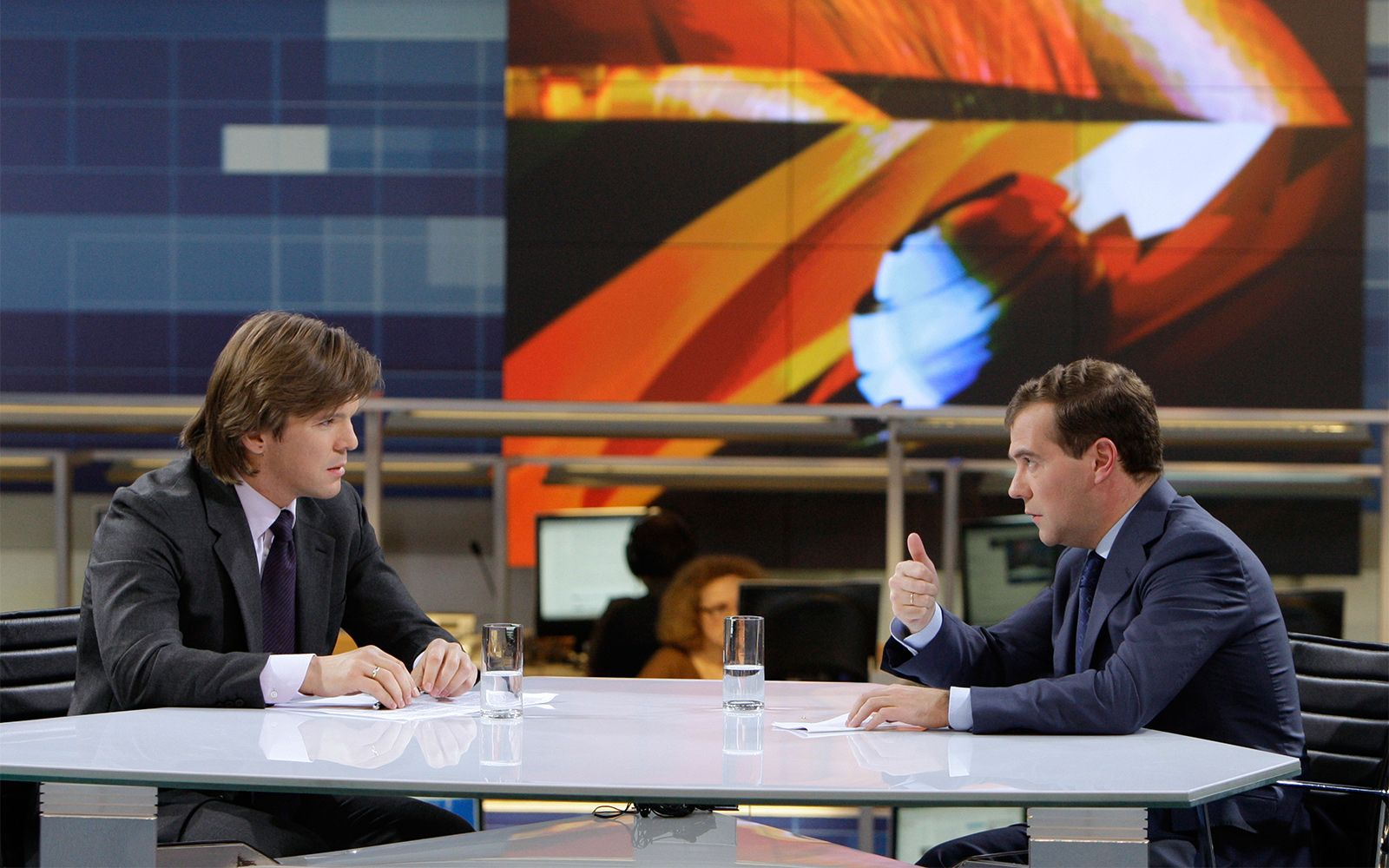
With President Dmitry Medvedev, 7 October 2009

Following Marina Ovsyannikova's on-screen protest on Channel One Russia opposing the 2022 Russian invasion of Ukraine, Kleimyonov denounced Ovsyannikova as a British spy.
