= Alexandr Grishin (sports commentator) =

Russian sports commentator (1978–2025)

- Александр Гришин
- Born: June 26, 1978; Soviet Union
- Died: August 5, 2025 (aged 47); Bitsa, Moscow Oblast, Russia
- Education: Moscow Polytechnic University
- Occupations: Sportscaster, journalist
- Years active: 2002—2025

Alexandr Viktorovich Grishin (Russian: Александр Викторович Гришин; 26 June 1978 – 5 August 2025) was a Russian sports commentator and journalist who specialized in figure skating.

== Biography ==
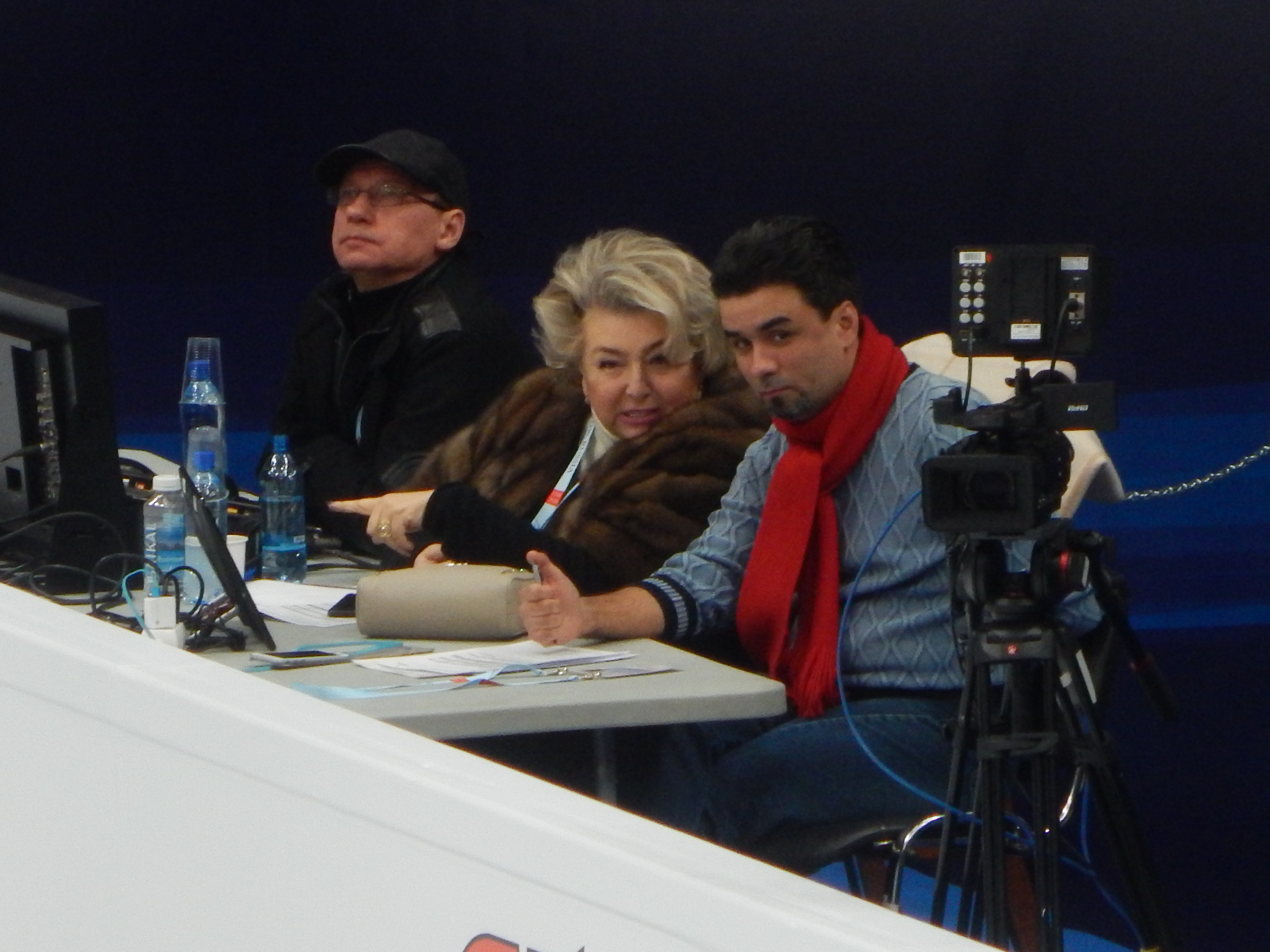
Alexandr Grishin (front) with Tatyana Tarasova at the European Figure Skating Championships. Moscow, Megasport Sports Palace, January 17, 2018

Alexander Grishin was born on June 26, 1978. From an early age, he loved playing football. At the age of 8, he began training in gymnastics at the CSKA sports school and later took up diving. He graduated from the Moscow State Technological University with a degree in Technology and Automation of Mechanical Engineering.

His career in sports journalism began in 2002 on the 7TV channel, where he worked as a correspondent on the "Football Affairs" (a few months later the show, hosted by Ilya Kazakov and Vladimir Stognienko, was renamed “Football of Russia” and started airing on VGTRK channels). From 2004 to 2015, he worked for the Sport channel (Russia-2), and then at Match TV until 2018. From 2018 until his death, he commented on competitions on Channel One Russia.

Grishin covered the Olympic Games, the World and European Figure Skating and football, as well as national Russian tournaments. He often worked in tandem with Tatyana Tarasova. Grishin also reported directly from major rally raids such as the Dakar Rally, Silk Way Rally, and Africa Eco Race. Occasionally, he commentated on diving and weightlifting events, including during the 2016 Olympic Games.

== Death ==
Grishin died in Bitsa, Moscow Oblast on 5 August 2025, at the age of 47. His death was "as a result of an accident on a railway platform in heavy rain", according to his wife. He was buried at the Domodedovo Cemetery. A figure skating show and memorial event was organized in the Navka Arena on October 5th and broadcast on Channel One.

== Personal life ==
Grishin was married to Anastasia Grishina. In September 2023, their son Pavel was born.

== Awards and recognition ==
Grishin was repeatedly nominated for the "Voice of Sport" award:

- 2018 — the category "Best Olympic Games Commentator";
- 2022 — the categories "Best Sports Commentator (Media Choice)", "Best Olympic Games Commentator", "Best Commentary Duo".
