= Ice Age (TV program) =

Russian ice show

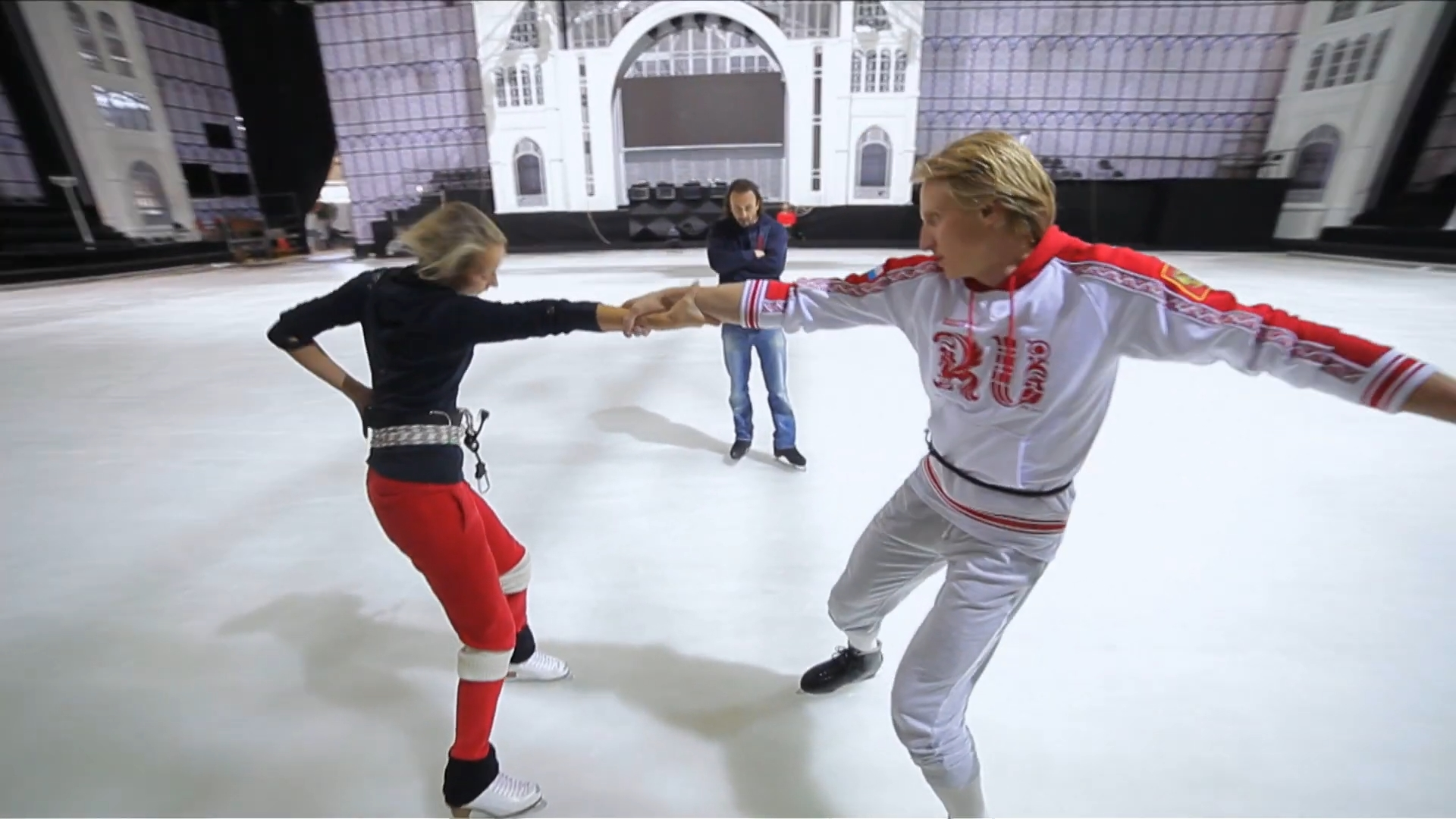
- Oxana Domnina (left), Ivan Skobrev (right) and the producer Ilya Averbukh (front) in a rehearsal for the show
- Original title: Ледниковый период
- Genre: Ice show
- Presented by: Marat Basharov; Irina Slutskaya; Ingeborga Dapkunaite; Alla Mikheyeva; Alexei Yagudin; Alina Zagitova; Anna Shcherbakova
- Narrated by: Andrey Golovanov
- Country of origin: Russia
- Original language: Russian

Production
- Producer: Ilya Averbukh
- Running time: 2 hours 40 minutes
- Production company: Channel One Russia

Original release
- Release: 1 September 2007 – present

Ice Age (Russian: Ледниковый период, romanized: Lednikovy period) is a weekly Russian ice show. It is originally produced by Channel One Russia (Pervy Kanal), broadcasting intermittently since 2007.

== Description ==
The show Ice Age consists in a sports TV competition of several couples in figure skating. One of the partners in each pair is a well-known representative of the Russian theater, sports, ballet, stage, cinema or television, far from this sport, and the other is a titled professional in sports ice dancing or single figure skating.

The skills of the competing duets are judged by five judges headed by Honored Coach of the USSR Tatiana Tarasova. The marks are given on a six-point system in the same way as in real figure skating competitions before 2005 - for technique and artistry.

In the period from 2007 to 2014, the participants were divided in two teams led by coaches Alexander Zhulin and Ilya Averbukh. Coaches were also the authors of the dance numbers of their wards. Since 2015, Ilya Averbukh has been the coach and producer of the show. Figure skaters Maxim Stavisky, Albena Denkova and Elena Stanislavovna Maslennikova are also involved in staging dances and working with participants.

== Participants ==
=== 1st season ===
- Tatiana Navka - actor Ville Haapasalo
- TV presenter Larisa Verbitskaya - Povilas Vanagas
- Margarita Drobiazko - actor Alexander Dyachenko
- singer Victoria Dayneko - Alexey Yagudin
- ballerina Anastasia Volochkova - Anton Sikharulidze
- actor Grigory Siyatvinda - Elena Leonova
- singer Alexandra Savelyeva - Sergey Sakhnovsky
- Tatyana Totmyanina - singer Nikita Malinin
- actress Chulpan Khamatova - Roman Kostomarov
- actress Alisa Grebenshikova - Alexey Tikhonov
- Maria Petrova - comedian Mikhail Galustyan
- Irina Lobacheva - actor Dmitry Maryanov
- Albena Denkova - actor Igor Vernik
- actress Olga Kabo - Maxim Marinin
- tennis player Anastasia Myskina - Andrey Khvalko
- Anna Semenovich - actor Alexei Makarov

=== 2nd season ===
- actress Alyona Babenko - Roman Kostomarov
- actress and TV presenter Ekaterina Strizhenova - Alexey Tikhonov
- Ekaterina Gordeeva - actor Egor Beroev
- actress Ksenia Alferova - Povilas Vanagas
- singer Anna Sedokova – Andrey Khvalko
- Margarita Drobyazko - actor Dmitry Miller
- actress Olesya Zheleznyak - Maxim Marinin
- actress Valeria Lanskaya - Alexey Yagudin
- Irina Lobacheva - actor Vladimir Shevelkov
- Anna Semenovich - fencer Pavel Kolobkov
- actress Tatyana Arntgolts / Olga Arntgolts - Maxim Stavisky
- Tatyana Totmyanina - TV presenter Leonid Zakoshansky
- singer Vera Brezhneva – Vazgen Azroyan
- actress Anastasia Makeeva – Alexander Abt
- Albena Denkova - showman Timur Rodriguez
- singer Zhanna Friske - Vitaly Novikov
- Maria Petrova - boxer Konstantin Tsyu
- Tatiana Navka - actor Vadim Kolganov
- Irina Slutskaya - choreographer Gediminas Taranda

=== 3rd season ===
- Tatiana Navka - actor Marat Basharov / actor Egor Beroev
- Anna Semenovich - actor Vadim Kolganov
- Margarita Drobyazko - actor Pyotr Krasilov
- Elena Berezhnaya - comedian Mikhail Galustyan
- Actress Valeria Lanskaya - Alexey Yagudin
- Actress Alisa Grebenshikova - Maxim Stavisky
- Ballerina Anastasia Volochkova - Maxim Marinin
- Actress Alyona Babenko - Alexey Tikhonov
- Anzhelika Krylova - actor Vyacheslav Razbegaev
- Actress Anna Bolshova – Povilas Vanagas
- Singer Yulia Kovalchuk - Roman Kostomarov
- Albena Denkova - jazzman Igor Butman
- Actress Ksenia Alferova - Pyotr Chernyshev
- Irina Lobacheva - actor Dmitry Maryanov

=== 4th season ===
- Actress Lyanka Gryu - Maxim Marinin
- Actor Artem Mikhalkov - Tatyana Navka
- Actress Marusya Zykova - Roman Kostomarov
- Singer Anita Tsoi — Alexey Tikhonov
- Actress Irina Medvedeva - Povilas Vanagas
- Actress Katerina Shpitsa - Maxim Stavisky
- Actress Yulia Zimina - Petr Tchernyshev
- Singer Nyusha - Maxim Shabalin
- Margarita Drobiazko - ice hockey centre Alexey Yashin
- Yana Khokhlova - comedian Dmitriy Khrustalev
- Albena Denkova - actor Petr Kislov
- Maria Petrova - actor Askold Zapashny
- Tatiana Totmyanina - actor Oskar Kuchera
- Oksana Domnina - actor Vladimir Yaglych

=== 5th season ===
- Oksana Domnina - speed skater Ivan Skobrev
- Peter Tchernyshev - actress Elena Podkaminskaya
- Povilas Vanagas - actress Anna Begunova
- Roman Kostomarov - actress Alexandra Ursuliak
- Maria Petrova - actor Valery Nikolaev
- Tatyana Totmyanina – actor Artur Smolyaninov
- Maxim Stavisky - singer Alena Toymintseva
- Margarita Drobyazko - actor Stanislav Yarushin
- Alexey Tikhonov – actress Kristina Asmus
- Yana Khokhlova – singer Aleksey Goman
- Albena Denkova – comedian Timur Batrudinov
- Maxim Marinin - comedian Alla Mikheeva

=== 6th season ===
- Tatiana Navka — actor Andrey Burkovsky
- Oksana Domnina — actor Daniil Spivakovsky
- Albena Denkova — actor Viktor Vasiliev
- Maria Petrova — singer Alexey Serov
- Yana Khokhlova - singer Irakli Pirtschalava
- Margarita Drobyazko — actor Anatoly Rudenko
- Tatyana Totmyanina — actor Mikhail Gavrilov
- Actress Darya Moroz - Oleg Vasiliev
- Comedian Ekaterina Varnava - Maxim Marinin
- Actress Angelika Kashirina — Roman Kostomarov
- Singer Yulianna Karaulova — Maxim Trankov

=== 7th season ===
- actress Olga Kuzmina and Alexander Enbert
- actor Vyacheslav Chepurchenko and Tatyana Totmyanina (episodes 1-2)/Yana Khokhlova (from episode 3)
- TV presenter Regina Todorenko and Roman Kostomarov
- actor Wolfgang Cerny and Oksana Domnina
- actress Irina Pegova and Alexey Tikhonov
- football player Dmitry Sychev and Maria Petrova
- actress Maria Lugovaya and Povilas Vanagas
- singer and TV presenter Olga Buzova and Dmitry Solovyov
- actor Evgeny Pronin and Tatyana Volosozhar (dropped out in the 10th episode) - 9th place
- singer Vlad Topalov and Elena Ilinykh (dropped out in the 9th issue) - 10th place
- singer Vlad Sokolovsky and Ekaterina Bobrova (dropped out in the 8th episode) - 11th place
- correspondent Olga Pautova and Maxim Shabalin (dropped out in the 7th episode) - 12th place
- TV presenter Vladimir Marconi and Margarita Drobiazko (dropped out in episode 6) - 13th place
- actress Nadezhda Mikhalkova and Maxim Marinin (dropped out in episode 5) - 14th place

=== 8th season ===
- Ekaterina Bobrova - actor Makar Zaporozhsky
- TV presenter Kseniya Borodina - Dmitry Soloviev
- Tatyana Volosozhar - actor Fedor Fedotov
- Oksana Domnina - actor Kirill Zaytsev
- Natalya Zabyako - actor Nikita Presnyakov
- Actress Darya Melnikova - Maxim Marinin
- Evgenia Medvedeva - singer, TikToker Danya Milokhin
- Actress Agata Muceniece - Alexander Enbert
- Adelina Sotnikova - singer David Manukyan (eliminated before the start of the show)
- Actress Anna Starshenbaum - Roman Kostomarov
- Actress Yanina Studilina - Vitaly Novikov
- Tatiana Totmyanina - actor Ivan Kolesnikov
- Yana Khokhlova - actor Gela Meskhi
- Actress Aglaya Shilovskaya - Maxim Shabalin

=== 9th season ===
- Elena Ilinykh - actor Egor Beroev
- Actress Valeria Lanskaya - Roman Kostomarov
- Evgenia Medvedeva - singer, TikToker Danya Milokhin
- Actress Darya Moroz - Maxim Marinin
- Singer Natalya Podolskaya - Dmitry Soloviev
- Victoria Sinitsina - speed skater Ivan Skobrev
- Alexander Enbert - singer Regina Todorenko
- Comedian Alla Mikheeva - Ivan Bukin
- Actress Liza Arzamasova - Nikita Katsalapov
- Tatiana Volosozhar - Vyacheslav Chepurchenko
- Oksana Domnina - TV host Marat Basharov
- Tatyana Totmyanina - actor Ivan Kolesnikov
