= Michael Bohm =

American journalist

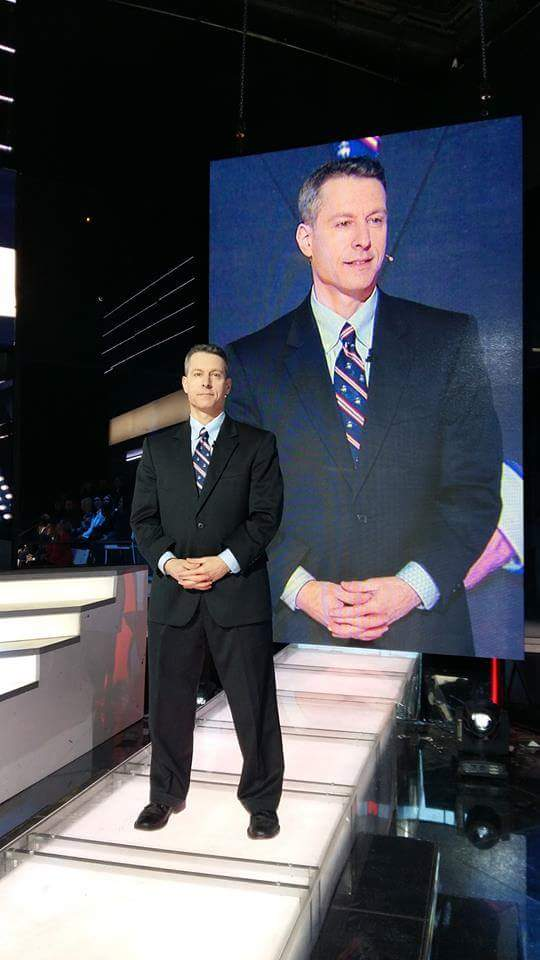
- Born: Michael Bohm; November 8, 1965 (age 60); St. Louis, United States
- Education: School of International and Public Affairs, Columbia University

Michael Bohm (Russian: Майкл Бом) is an American journalist, residing in Moscow, Russia. Bohm is a regular guest on Russian television political programs such as Time Will Tell, Special Correspondent, and Evening with Vladimir Solovyov.

== Biography ==
=== Early life ===
Michael Bohm was born on November 8, 1965, in St. Louis, Missouri. Michael's father, Robert Bohm, is a businessman. Michael has an older brother, Rich, and a younger sister, Julie. Rich works as a tax consultant, and Julie followed in her mother's footsteps by becoming a teacher.

Bohm first came to Russia in 1987 as a student. Bohm eventually returned as an insurance executive in 1997. He studied at Lawrence University and in graduate school at the School of International Affairs at Columbia University in New York City. He is the author of a book about the Russian character called The Russian Specific.

=== Career ===
Bohm has lived and worked in Russia for nearly twenty years. He is fluent in Russian, speaking with a slight accent.

From 2007 to 2014, he served as an opinion page editor and wrote an op-ed column for the Moscow Times.

Bohm also writes a blog for the liberal radio station Echo of Moscow. He taught a journalism course in 2015 at the Moscow State Institute of International Relations.

His opinion columns have been published in "Moskovsky Komsomolets" and "Nezavisimaya Gazeta."

In 2015 a book was published in his name, President Putin's Mistake, in which Bohm sued the author for intellectual property violations. He won the lawsuit in a Moscow court.

=== Controversies ===
Bohm received nationwide attention throughout Russia in 2013 when during a TV appearance, he said Russian's views on gay rights were primitive. After a commercial break Bohm was asked to apologize.

In October 2017, while on the show Time Will Tell, Bohm was assaulted by the host Artyom Sheynin. The incident erupted after a heated discussion about the US having denied the Russian consulate in San Francisco diplomatic status in 2017, after which US authorities removed Russia's flags from the compound. The scuffle was broken up by the co-host Ekaterina Strizhenova.

An investigation from the French public broadcasting service Arte indicates some of Bohm's appearances might have been staged. They allege that Bohm made these TV appearances in the guise of representing a critical view of Russian policies, only to abruptly change face throughout the program to a more pro-Russia stance. Social media posts back this up. Arte advocates for a more critical look at the role of Bohm and other western political commentators involved in Russian television.

=== Private life ===
Bohm married Svetlana who was 16 years his junior. The wedding took place in Russia, according to Russian traditions. Immediately after the wedding, Bohm became a father. Their daughter's name is Nicole. At the end of 2015, Michael and Svetlana divorced. Now ex-wife Svetlana and Nicole live near Moscow. Bohm has a Russian residency permit.

== See also ==
- Tim Kirby (radio host)
