= Strizhenov =

Strizhenov (masculine, Russian: Стриженов) or Strizhenova (feminine, Russian: Стриженова) is a Russian surname. Notable people with the surname include:

- Gleb Strizhenov (1925–1985), Soviet actor, brother of Oleg
- Oleg Strizhenov (1929–2025), Soviet–Russian actor, brother of Gleb
- Yekaterina Strizhenova (born 1968), Russian actress and television presenter, daughter-in-law of Oleg
