= Aleksandr Grishin =

Aleksandr Grishin may refer to:

- Aleksandr Grishin (footballer)
- Alexandr Grishin (sports commentator)
