= Santa Claus. Battle of the Magi =

2016 Russian film by Aleksandr Voytinskiy

- Theatrical release poster
- Directed by: Aleksandr Voytinskiy
- Written by: Aleksandr Voytinskiy; Lev Karasev; Lev Murzenko; Anna Ovsyannikova
- Produced by: Georgiy Malkov; Vladimir Polyakov; Lev Karasev; Aleksandr Voytinskiy; Aleksandr Yermolov; Daniil Makhort; Anastasiya Akopyan
- Starring: Taisiya Vilkova; Nikita Volkov; Fyodor Bondarchuk; Aleksei Kravchenko; Egor Beroev; Ksenia Alfyorova; Sergey Badyuk; Irina Antonenko; Igor Chekhov; Filipp Gorenshteyn; Vladimir Gostyukhin
- Cinematography: Anton Zenkovich
- Edited by: Lev Karasyov; Dimitri Vorontsov; Aleksandr Voytinskiy
- Music by: Dmitriy Selipanov
- Production companies: Angel - Film Company; Perpetual Eight
- Distributed by: 20th Century Fox CIS; Renovatio Entertainment
- Release date: 24 December 2016 (Russia)
- Running time: 117 minutes
- Country: Russia
- Language: Russian
- Budget: $3 million 200 million RUB
- Box office: $2.632.583

Santa Claus. Battle of the Magi (Russian: Дед Мороз. Битва магов, romanized: Ded Moroz. Bitva magov) is a 2016 Russian Christmas fantasy action film directed by Aleksandr Voytinskiy and produced by Georgiy Malkov, Vladimir Polyakov and Lev Karasev. The film's protagonist is Masha, a girl who witnesses an epic battle of monsters with young magicians in the center of Moscow; one of the sorcerers saves the girl and leads her to a secret organization where she learns not only that Father Frost (Santa Claus) truly does exist, but also that the New Year is a real magical ritual. It stars Taisiya Vilkova, with Nikita Volkov, Fyodor Bondarchuk, Aleksei Kravchenko, Egor Beroev, Ksenia Alfyorova, Sergey Badyuk, Irina Antonenko, Igor Chekhov and Filipp Gorenshteyn in supporting roles.

The premiere of the film in Russia took place on 24 December 2016, and it later appeared in Russian screens on the eve of the New Year 2017.

== Plot ==
Young Masha is tormented by visions of flying fiery monsters. Mother worries about her daughter being bullied by classmates. But one day in the very center of Moscow Masha sees a battle of winged fire monsters with young people who call themselves magicians. One of them at the last moment, rescues Masha from the attack of a chimera. So Masha gets into a secret corporation, where she learns that Father Frost (Santa Claus) really exists and, leading an army of magicians able to control snow and ice, protects the Earth from the invasion of dark forces.

== Cast ==
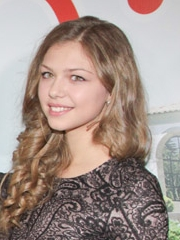
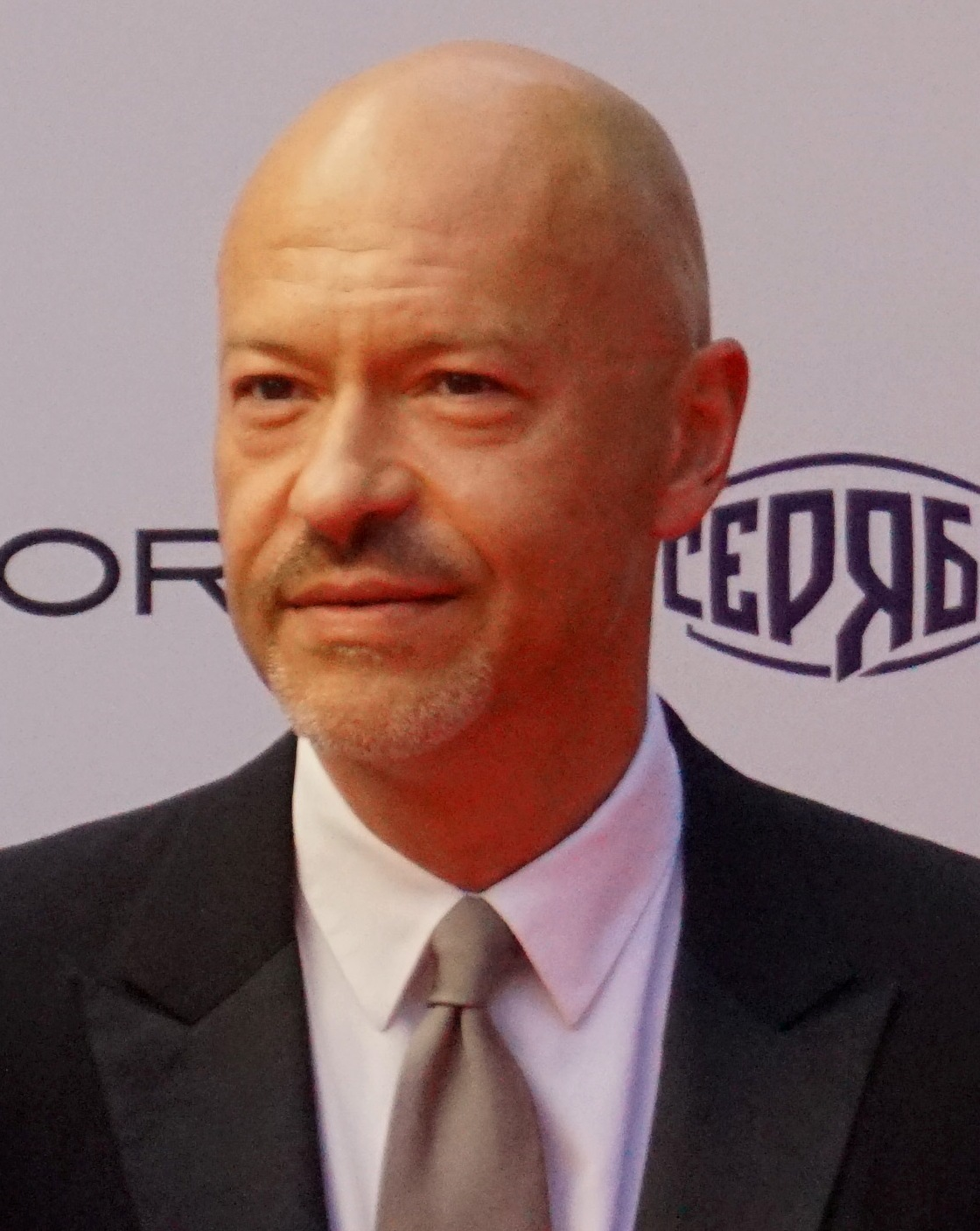
Taisiya Vilkova and Fyodor Bondarchuk, lead actors of the film
- Taisiya Vilkova as Mariya "Masha" Petrova
  - Marta Timofeeva as child Masha
- Nikita Volkov as Nikita Krutov
- Fyodor Bondarchuk as Miran Morozov, the Father Frost (Santa Claus)
- Aleksei Kravchenko as Karachun, the evil wizard
- Egor Beroev as Masha's father
- Ksenia Alfyorova as Masha's mother
- Sergey Badyuk as Dobrohot, the chief assistant of Santa Claus.
- Irina Antonenko as Lina
- Igor Chekhov as Ilya
- Filipp Gorenshteyn as Maks
- Vladimir Gostyukhin as Vitaliy Semenovich
- Svetlana Permyakova as Baba Lyuba
- Yan Tsapnik as participant of the auction
- Anastasiya Ukolova as Asya Raevskaya, Snegurochka (The Snow Maiden)
- Taras Glushakov as Stepan
- Maksim Pinsker as Santa Claus (II)
- Oleg Volku as Papay Noel
- Viktor Myutnikov as Daidi Na Nollaig
- Yevgeniy Saranchev as Ehee Dyshl
- Dmitriy Sitokhin as Khizir Ilyas
- Timur Koshelyov as Yolu Pukki
- Elina Sudyna as Irina Nikolaevna, music teacher
- Diana Pozharskaya as Elvira
- Peter Kovrizhnykh as Oleg Skvortsov

== Production ==
=== Development ===
The creators spent two years developing a unique mythology for the film, inspired by the New Year celebrations throughout different periods of Russian history. Over 50 intricate costumes were designed, including eight for Father Frost (Santa Claus) and three for his antagonist, Karachun. Makeup artists dedicated several hours daily to creating natural-looking beards, mustaches, and wigs for all the characters.

A large creative team worked diligently to create a magical atmosphere. Artists and graphic designers constructed immersive new worlds, such as the Santa Claus Corporation with secret rooms, an archive for letters to Santa Claus, and training halls for young magicians. They also designed the headquarters of the Morozov brothers at the North Pole and Karachun's lair. Additionally, they created numerous magical items and creatures, including Santa Claus's sleigh and staff, the magicians' snow-controlling spheres, the Lunar sword sought by Karachun, fire chimeras, and snow owls.

A computer graphics supervisor was present on set daily, and stuntmen participated in nearly 70% of the scenes.

=== Filming ===
The location filming took place from December last year on the streets of New Year's Moscow, all the main and large-scale events of the tape unfolded in places not only iconic for the New Year, but also supporting the atmosphere with their festive decoration and illumination - the Central Children's Store on Lubyanka, Red Square, Tsaritsyno Palace, Patriarch Ponds and Tverskaya Street.

== Release ==
Santa Claus. Battle of the Magi was released in the Russian Federation on 24 December 2016 by 20th Century Fox CIS.

=== Critical response ===
The film received mostly negative reviews in Russian media. He received only one positive review from the newspaper "Izvestia", which he called "quality family fantasy". All other reviews were neutral or negative. They wrote about the film: The scenario, suffering from all existing mental disorders, was wiped out by a sick fantasy, "Rossiyskaya Gazeta", It is possible to analyze the absurdities of the film indefinitely, The film leaves a sense of confusion.
