= Let Them Talk (talk show) =

- Genre: Talk show
- Directed by: Konstantin Kuts (2001–2003); Mikhail Anisimov (2003–2004); Roman Butovsky (2004–2009); Aleksei Morozov (2010–2024)
- Presented by: Andrey Malakhov (2001–2017); Dmitry Borisov (since 2017)
- Country of origin: Russia
- Original language: Russian

Production
- Executive producers: Sergey Kuzmenko (2001–2004); Gulnara Ilchinskaya (2004–2009)
- Producers: Alexander Mitroshenkov, Larisa Krivtsova (2001–2004); Natalia Nikonova (2004–2009); Mikhail Sharonin, Natalia Galkovich (2010–2024)
- Camera setup: Multiple
- Running time: 60 minutes

Original release
- Network: Syndicated; Channel One Russia and affiliates
- Release: July 23, 2001 – present

Let Them Talk (Russian: Пусть говорят, transliterated: Pust' govoryat) is a Russian talk show hosted by Dmitry Borisov. It invites guests to appear before a studio audience to address personal issues, such as crime, drug abuse, suicide, prostitution, and infidelity, as well as social issues, such as bombings, migration, and international relations.

The program is inspired by the American Jerry Springer show, although it was originally conceived as a clone of the Oprah Winfrey show.

== Notable episodes ==
Actress Lindsay Lohan appeared on the show in 2016. A leak contract showed that she had originally demanded a fee of $860,000 and an audience with Vladimir Putin if she were to appear on the show.

On Tuesday, February 1, 2017, rape victim Diana was a guest on the show. She talked about her rape at the hands of a 21-year-old man Semyonov. Semyonov was sentenced to eight years in a prison colony for “rape” and “violent acts of a sexual nature.” An appellate court later reduced his sentence to three years and three months. Commentators blamed Diana for provoking sexual assault. Almost all the panelists and most of the audience were clearly on the side of Semyonov. The show spawned many online debates and memes.

In early 2017, Nadezhda Semenyuk, former wife of triathlete Roman Paralonov, went on the show with her ex-husband, who had severely beat her.

In September 2024, it became known about the final return of "Let Them Talk" in an updated version. Filming began on October 29, 2024. The program will resume airing on November 11, 2024 at 19:50.
