= Ilya Kazakov (journalist) =

Russian football commentator, TV presenter and journalist (born 1972)

- Илья Казаков
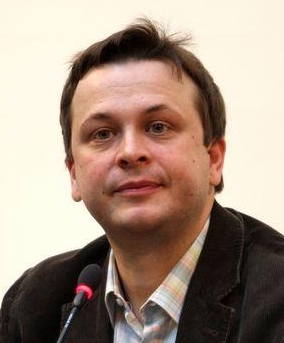
- Kazakov in 2010
- Born: 3 August 1972 (age 54); Kaliningrad, Moscow Oblast, Russian SFSR, Soviet Union
- Education: Moscow Power Engineering Institute
- Occupations: Sports commentator; journalist; author

Ilya Arkadievich Kazakov (Russian: Илья Аркадьевич Казаков; born 3 August 1972) is a Russian football commentator, TV presenter, journalist, author and former press attaché of the Russian national football team (2005–2015). He was the Ambassador for 2018 FIFA World Cup host city Saransk.

== Biography ==
In 1989-1996 he studied at the Faculty of Energy Physics of Moscow Power Engineering Institute. In February 1996 he graduated from the Moscow Power Engineering Institute with a degree in thermal engineering, and worked for six months in the specialty in RKK Energia.

On television, Ilya Kazakov came in 1996 after winning the first competition of sports commentators, announced by the television channel NTV-Plus. Since December 2001 to June 2003 he worked on the sports TV channel Seven TV, where he conducted weekly broadcasts about the Russian Championship.

In June 2003, Ilya Kazakov switched to the newly opened sports TV channel VGTRK Sport (since 2010 it became the television channel Russia-2). Here he conducted the program Football of Russia, commented on various football matches. Commented on the matches of the World and European Championships in 2004 (from Portugal), 2006 (from Germany), 2008 (from Austria and Switzerland), 2010 (from South Africa) and 2016 (from France). He worked on the broadcasts of the championships of Russia and England, as well as matches of European soccer championships the Champions League and the UEFA Cup.

In 2005 he commentateded on all the matches of CSKA in the winning UEFA Cup, including the final from Lisbon. He conducted live coverage of the election of organizers of the World Cups in football in 2018 and 2022 and many similar ceremonies of FIFA and UEFA.

In addition to football, he covered skiing at the 2010 Olympics and the 2011 World Hockey Championship.

From September 2015 to present — adviser to the President of the Handball Federation of Russia.

Since November 2016, he hosts the updated version of the program Football of Russia on the TV channel Russia-24, alternately with Vladimir Stognienko.

== Personal life ==
His wife is Maria. He is friends with Valery Nepomnyashchy. He is a fan of Shakhtar Donetsk.

== Books ==
- 2008 — This Team, or the Hiddink Phenomenon (Russian: Настоящая сборная, или Феномен Хиддинка)
- 2015 — Foot'Ball People (Russian: Foot’Больные люди)
- 2017 — Girl Behind Back (Russian: Девушка за спиной)
