= Good Morning (Russian TV program) =

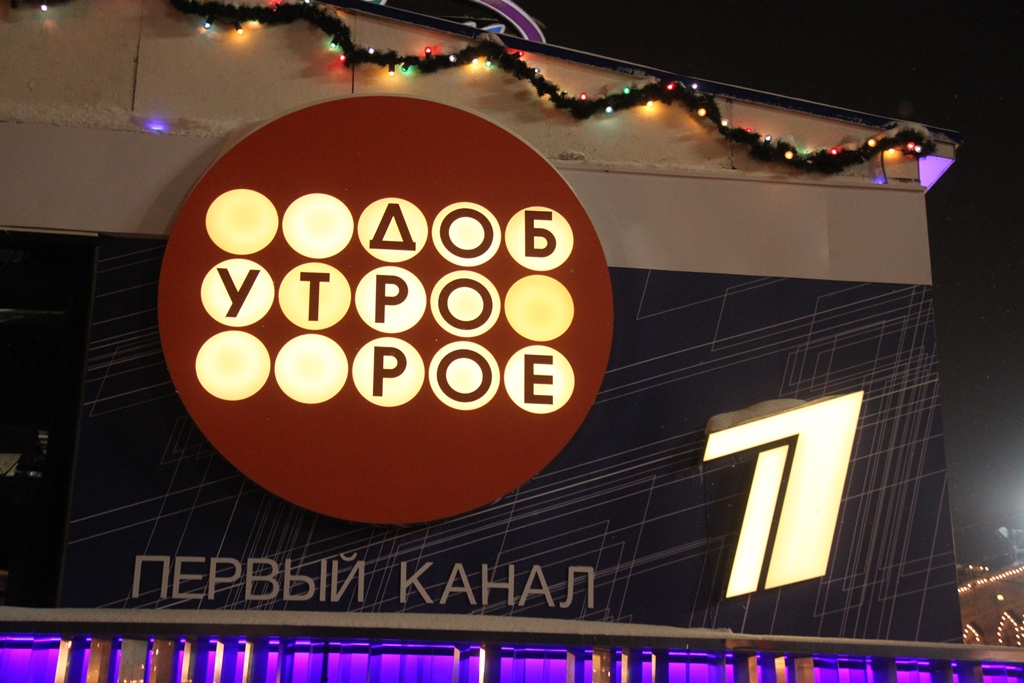
- Genre: Breakfast television
- Country of origin: Russia
- Original language: Russian

Production
- Running time: 180 minutes
- Production company: Channel One (Russia)

Original release
- Release: 1986 – present

Good Morning (Russian: Доброе Утро, romanized: Dobroye Utro) is a Russian morning television program and talk show that is broadcast on Channel One (Russia). It debuted in 1986, and has aired ever since.

The program features news, interviews, and weather forecasts. The primary anchors are Tatyana Vedeneyeva (1988—1996, 2000), Larisa Verbitskaya (1987—2014), Ekaterina Andreeva (1992—1993), Andrey Malakhov (1995—2001), Arina Sharapova (2001—present), Yekaterina Strizhenova (1997—present), Larisa Krivtsova (1997—2003), Alexander Nevsky (1999), Yana Churikova (2002), Irina Apeksimova (2006—2008), Boris Shcherbakov (2007—2014) and Marina Kim (2014–present).

== Program team ==
=== Television presenters ===
- Yekaterina Strizhenova
- Yulia Zimina
- Svetlana Zeynalova
- Timur Solovyev
- Olga Ushakova
- Roman Budnikov
- Anastasia Tregubova
- Irina Muromtseva
- Sergey Babaev
- Anastasia Orlova
- Polina Tsvetkova
- Evgeny Pokrovsky

=== Reporters ===
- Sergey Abramov-Sotnik
- Dmitry Kuzmin
- Alexander Zheleznov
- Elizaveta Nikishova
- Anna Soldatova
- Margarita Ilyina
- Natalia Kovaleva
- Ruslan Yunyaev
- Olga Yakunina
- Anastasia Savelyeva
- Natalia Lyubchenko
- Maria Osadnik
- Karina Makaryan
- Svetlana Neimanis
