= Wait for Me (TV program) =

Russian television program

Original title

Wait for Me (Russian: Жди меня, romanized: Zhdi menya) is an international telecast, talk show and also a popular public search service. It appeared on Russian television since March 14, 1998. It was originally broadcast on Russia-1 (1998), before being broadcast on ORT (since 2002 on Channel One Russia) (1999–2017) and currently is being broadcast on NTV. Wait for Me is also a TEFI TV Award winner (2018).

The production of the program is handled by the television company VIDgital. The authors of idea were journalists Oksana Naychuk and Victoria El-Mualla.

In the first years of the program's existence, it was possible to find 15-20 people each month with its help, and in 10 years about 150 thousand people were found. By October 2017, their number had increased to 200 thousand.

Since 2005, VID has begun production of Wait for Me for viewing in other countries. Since then, the program has come out in an international format.

Also, from October 2000 to 2004 a newspaper was published with the same name.

== Presenters ==
- Oksana Naychuk (1998)
- Igor Kvasha (1998–2012)
- Maria Shukshina (1999–2014)
- Sergei Nikonenko (2000, 2008)
- Chulpan Khamatova (2005–2006)
- Aleksandr Domogarov (2005)
- Mikhail Yefremov (2009–2014)
- Egor Beroev (2014)
- Aleksandr Galibin (2014–2017)
- Ksenia Alfyorova (2014–2017)
- Sergei Shakurov (2017–2018)
- Julia Vysotskaya (2017–2018)
- Grigory Sergeev (2017–2018)
- Aleksandr Lazarev Jr. (since 2018)
- Tatyana Arntgolts (since 2018)
- Alyona Babenko (since 2023)
