= Karlo Lukanov =

Bulgarian politician (1897–1982)

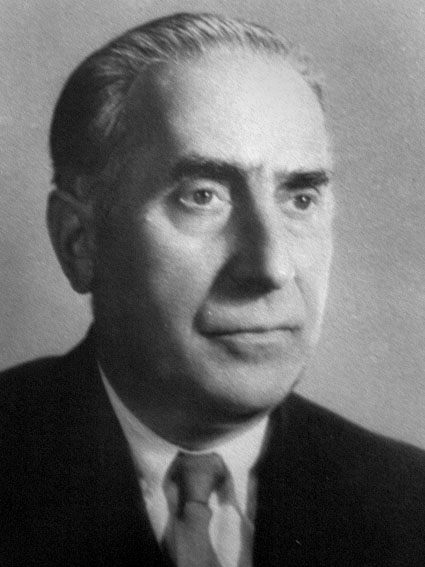

Minister of Foreign Affairs
- In office 11 August 1956 – 27 November 1962
- Prime Minister: Anton Yugov
- Preceded by: Mincho Neychev
- Succeeded by: Ivan Bashev

Personal details
- Born: 1 November 1897 Pleven, Bulgaria
- Died: 15 July 1982 (aged 84) Sofia, Bulgaria
- Party: BCP (1917–1982)
- Children: 1 (Andrey)
- Education: Sofia University
- Occupation: Jurist, Politician

Karlo Todorov Lukanov (Bulgarian: Карло Тодоров Луканов; 1 November [O.S. 20 October] 1897 – 15 July 1982) was a Bulgarian politician of the Bulgarian Communist Party and Minister of Foreign Affairs from 1956 to 1962. His father Todor Lukanov and his son Andrey Lukanov were both prominent socialist and communist politicians.

== Biography ==
Karlo Lukanov was born in Pleven, a city in north central Bulgaria, to the family of Todor Lukanov, a socialist politician and member of the National Assembly of Bulgaria from Lovech. In 1917, he graduated from the Military School for Reserve Officers and took part in World War I as part of the Bulgarian Army's 26th Artillery Regiment. In the same year, Lukanov joined the Bulgarian Workers' Social Democratic Party (Narrow Socialists), a precursor of the Bulgarian Communist Party.

In 1921, Lukanov graduated in law from the Clement of Ohrid University of Sofia to become a lawyer in Pleven. During the White Terror which ensued in the wake of the St Nedelya Church assault of 1925, he was sentenced to four years in prison, but amnestied in 1926. Shortly thereafter, Lukanov moved to the Soviet Union, where he worked as a clerk at a construction company. From 1927 to 1944, he was on the books of the All-Union Communist Party (Bolsheviks), later known as the Communist Party of the Soviet Union. In 1936, Lukanov left for Spain, where he remained until 1939. In Spain, Lukanov took various governing positions within the International Brigades that assisted the Republican forces in the Spanish Civil War. He was known as "Major Belov". From November 1936 to February 1937 he was Chief of Staff of the XII International Brigade, known as the "Garibaldi Brigade". In July 1937 he was appointed commander of the base in Albacete, which was the administrative and training center of the International brigades. After his return to Moscow, Lukanov worked at the Comintern and from 1941 on at the Hristo Botev Bulgarian-language radio.

Following the 9 September coup d'état of 1944, Lukanov returned to Bulgaria, where he was appointed director of the Bulgarian National Radio by the newly established communist government. He went on to hold various offices, including deputy chairman of the State Planning Commission, a ministry-rank institution in charge of the People's Republic of Bulgaria's planned economy (1947–1949), chairman of the Committee for Science, Art and Culture (1949), chairman of the State Planning Commission (1949–1952) and deputy Prime Minister of Bulgaria (1952–1954) under Valko Chervenkov.

In 1954, Lukanov was elected member of the Central Committee of the Bulgarian Communist Party, a post he held until the end of his life. From 1954 to 1956, he was Bulgarian ambassador to the Soviet Union, Mongolia and Finland. Upon his return to Bulgaria Karlo Lukanov was appointed Minister of Foreign Affairs under Anton Yugov (1956–1962) and briefly deputy Prime Minister (1956–1957). After his release from the government, he was sent to Switzerland as Bulgarian ambassador (1963–1966). He died in Sofia on 15 July 1982 at the age of 84.

Political offices
Preceded by Mincho Neychev	Foreign Minister of Bulgaria; 11 August 1956 – 27 November 1962	Succeeded by Ivan Hristov Bashev
