= Tim Kirby (radio host) =

American-Russian radio host (b. 1981)

- Born: Timothy Dennis Kirby; October 19, 1981 (age 45); Cleveland, Ohio, U.S.
- Citizenship: United States; Russia (since 2018)
- Education: Art Institute of Pittsburgh
- Occupations: Radio host, political commentator
- Spouse: Inge Morozova

Timothy Dennis Kirby (Russian: Тимоти Деннис Керби), known as Tim Kirby (Тим Керби), is an American-Russian radio personality based in Moscow. In 2006, Kirby migrated from the United States to Russia. He is best known for the program Alien on the radio station Mayak (Радио Маяк). He has often appeared on the Russian TV and multi-media network RT.

== Personal life ==
Kirby is married to Inge Morozova, a native of Kirov. He obtained Russian citizenship in 2018.

== See also ==
- Michael Bohm
- Jeff Monson
