= Mincho Neychev =

Bulgarian politician

- Минчо Нейчев
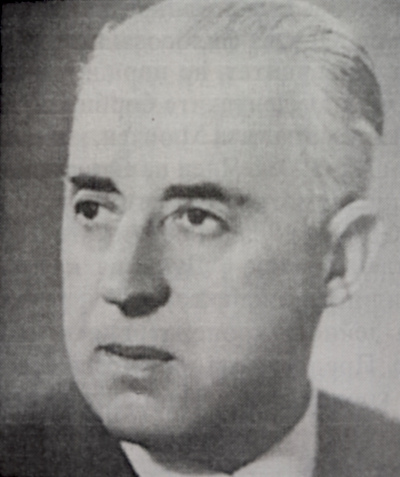
- Neychev, before c. 1950

Chairman of the Presidium of the National Assembly
- In office 9 December 1947 – 27 May 1950
- Preceded by: Vasil Kolarov
- Succeeded by: Georgi Damyanov

Foreign Minister of Bulgaria
- In office 27 May 1950 – 11 August 1956
- Preceded by: Vladimir Poptomov
- Succeeded by: Karlo Lukanov

Minister of Public Education
- In office 22 November 1946 – 11 December 1947
- Preceded by: Stoyan Kosturkov
- Succeeded by: Kirill Dramaliev

Minister of Justice
- In office 9 September 1944 – 31 March 1946
- Preceded by: Boris Pavlov
- Succeeded by: Luben Kolarov

Personal details
- Born: Mincho Kolev Neychev; 4 April 1887 Stara Zagora, Principality of Bulgaria
- Died: 11 August 1956 (aged 69) Targovishte, People's Republic of Bulgaria
- Party: Bulgarian Communist Party

Mincho Kolev Neychev (Bulgarian: Минчо Колев Нейчев; 4 April 1887 – 11 August 1956) was a Bulgarian communist political figure. He was born in Stara Zagora, and served as the Chairman of the Presidium of the National Assembly (head of state) between 1947 and 1950. He then served as foreign minister of Bulgaria from 1950 until his death on 11 August 1956, although he was removed from the Politburo in 1954.

== See also ==
- List of Bulgarians

Political offices
| Preceded by Vasil Kolarov | Chairman of the Presidium of the National Assembly; 9 December 1947 – 27 May 1950 | Succeeded by Georgi Damyanov |
| Preceded by Vladimir Poptomov | Foreign Minister of Bulgaria; 27 May 1950 – 11 August 1956 | Succeeded by Karlo Lukanov |
