= Larisa Krivtsova =

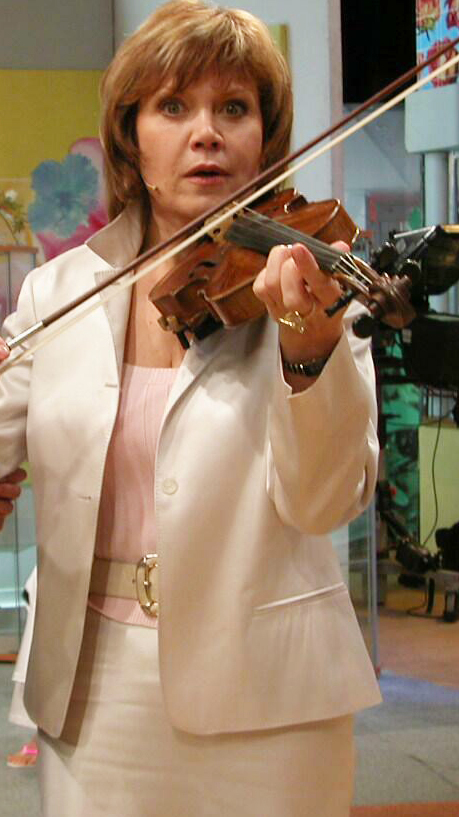
Larisa Krivtsova in 2007

Larisa Valentinovna Krivtsova (Russian: Лари́са Валентиновна Кривцо́ва; born January 1, 1949, Lithuanian Soviet Socialist Republic) is a Soviet and Russian journalist, producer, director, media manager, and former TV presenter (1991–2004).

== Biography ==
In 1974 she graduated from the Yaroslavl State Pedagogical Institute in the specialty Russian language and literature. In the same year he was admitted to the Yaroslavl Theater School at the acting department.

In journalism since 1980 (director of Yaroslavl Television Studio).

In 1986, he graduated from the journalism faculty of Moscow Higher Party School. In 1987 - the correspondent of the Moscow edition of Soviet Central Television.

From December 1997, before 2003, she was a permanent host of the program Good Morning on Thursday on the Channel One Russia.

Since 2008, Director of the morning program Channel One. Creator and a source of inspiration software Let Them Talk, Malakhov+, Fashion Sentence, City of Women, Big Lunch.

The author of a cycle of journalistic works Of contemporary life Mowgli, devoted to the problems of children's homes.

=== Personal life ===
Krivtsova is married. Her son, Yevgeny, is a journalist and broadcaster.
