= Vladimir Stognienko =

Russian sports commentator

Stognienko Vladimir Sergeevich
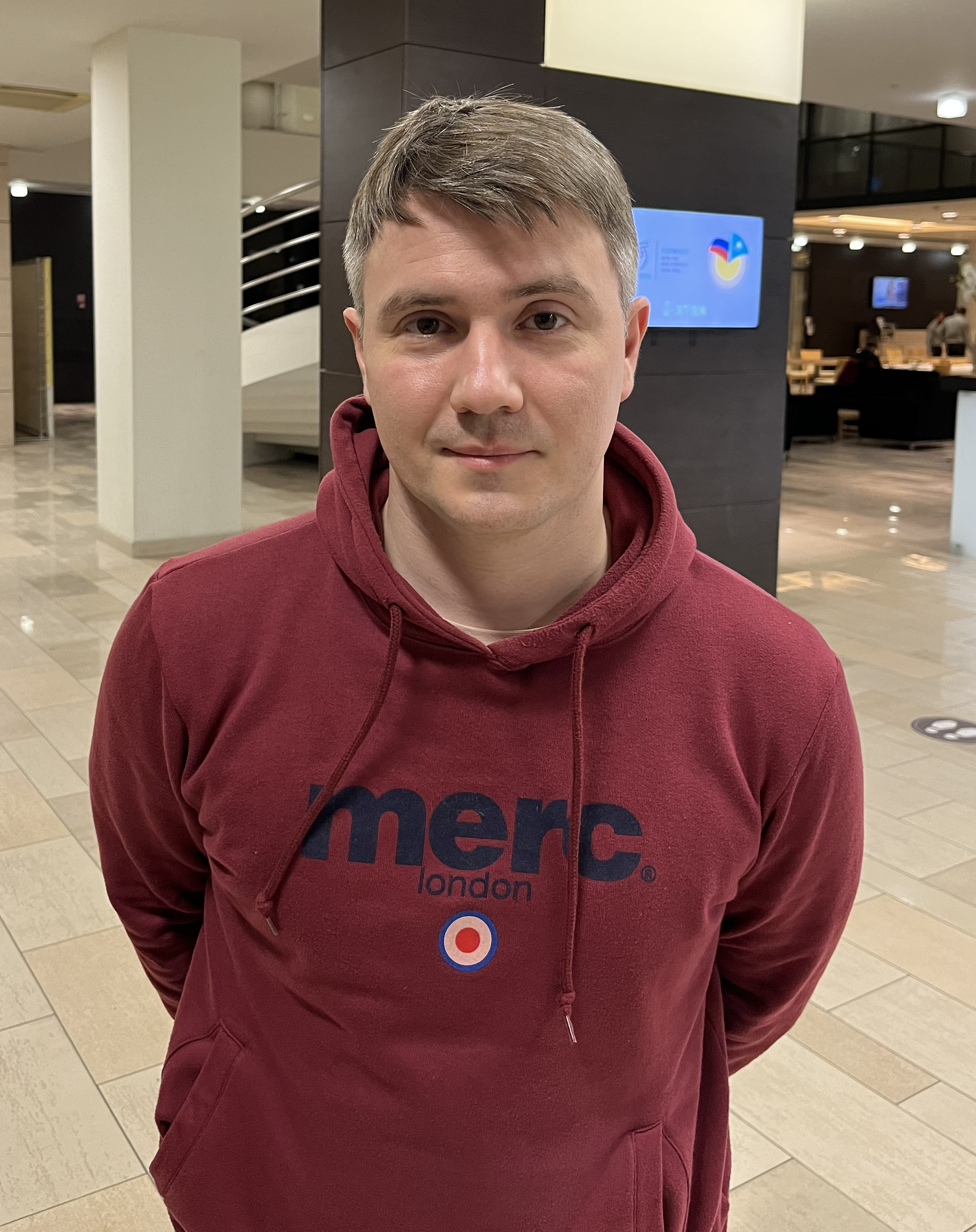
- Born: 20 August 1980 (age 45); Moscow, USSR
- Citizenship: Russia
- Occupations: sports journalist, TV presenter, football commentator, radio presenter, editor, correspondent
- Awards: "Golden Microphone" (2009) "TEFI" Award (2016)

Vladimir Sergeyevich Stognienko (born 20 August 1980, Moscow) is a Russian sports commentator. Currently, he is the editor-in-chief of Okko Sport and collaborates as a guest commentator with other TV channels. Previously, he worked for VGTRK and Eurosport 1 TV channel, as well as for NTV-Plus Football TV channels (later — Match! Football 1"), "7TV", "Sport" (later — "Russia-2"), "Sport-1" and the channels of the subholding "Match!".

== Career ==
He began his television career in February 2001. His first feature on federal television aired on 9 April 2001, on "Football Club".

In 2002, he moved to the channel "7TV". He worked as a football department correspondent and commentator, traveling on assignments across the country and abroad. Together with Andrey Golovanov, he commentated on matches of the Italian championship.

He made his debut as a commentator in 2002. He first appeared on screen in 2003 . From 2003 to 2005, he simultaneously commentated and read sports news on the "Eurosport" channel.

From August 2004 to October 2015, he was a commentator for the "Sport" channel, later renamed "Russia-2". He first appeared as a host on the channel on 21 May 2008, during the pre-match studio for the Moscow UEFA Champions League final. From 2008 to 2013, he hosted the program "Football of Russia".

From November 2010 to February 2011, he was the editor-in-chief of the Russian edition of the SportWeek magazine.

In August 2015, he was hired as a staff member of the new sports channel "Match TV".

From 13 May 2016, he began collaborating with the sports channel Eurosport 1. From 19 May to 31 December 2016, he was an observer at the sports internet portal Championat.com.

In summer 2016, he became the head of the sports editorial office of the Russia-24 channel.

== Commentary career ==
He worked on matches of championships in Russia, England, Italy, France, Netherlands, and Spain, as well as matches of European cups (Champions League, UEFA Cup), Olympic football tournaments, World Cups (2006, 2010, 2014, 2018, 2022), European Championships (2008, 2012, 2016, 2020, 2024) and Copa América (2015, 2021, 2024).

In 2010, he commentated live on the World Cup final on the "Rossiya-1" channel, between the national teams of Spain and the Netherlands in South Africa. Two years later, he reprised this role in the final of the 2012 European Championship (Spain vs. Italy).

He commentated on several matches of the 2014 World Cup on the "Rossiya-1" channel, including the opening match alongside Sergey Brilyov, as well as the semifinal match Brazil vs. Germany on the "Sport-1" channel.

In September 2016, he commentated on matches of the 2016 World Cup of Hockey on the "Championat.com" portal.

In 2018, during the home World Cup, he commentated on two matches of the Russian national team against Egypt and the round of 16 against Spain, as well as the final.

== Awards ==
At the end of the 2009 Russian football championship, he received the award "Golden Microphone," presented by Komsomolskaya Pravda and Soviet Sport . In summer 2016, he became a laureate of the television award TEFI in the category "Host of a Sports Program/Sports Commentator". In 2019, he was awarded an Honorary Certificate by the Ministry of Sports of the Russian Federation "for achievements in the field of physical culture and sports".
