= Larisa Verbitskaya =

Russian television host

- Лариса Вербицкая
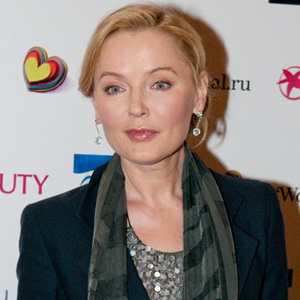
- Verbitskaya in 2010
- Born: Larisa Viktorovna Verbitskaya; 30 November 1959 (age 66); Feodosia, Crimean Oblast, Ukrainian SSR, Soviet Union
- Occupations: announcer, TV presenter
- Children: 2
- Parents: Viktor Verbitsky (father); Elena Shcherbatyuk (mother)

Larisa Viktorovna Verbitskaya (Russian: Лари́са Ви́кторовна Верби́цкая; born November 30, 1959, Feodosia, Crimean Oblast, Ukrainian SSR) is a Soviet and Russian announcer and TV presenter. In the past, the host of the popular TV show Good Morning (1987—2014).

Russian spokesperson in Eurovision Song Contest 2001 and Eurovision Dance Contest 2008.

== Life and career ==
She was born on November 30, 1959, in Feodosia in the Crimean region. Father was a military man, he was transferred to Chișinău. The father died in the 1990s. Mother, Elena Scherbatyuk, worked as a senior operating nurse. Mother was brought up in an orphanage, in 1946 her parents died of starvation, there were seven children in the family.

She studied at an English school in Chișinău, in an English language course, her parents wanted her to study at the Institute of International Relations. She did sports: acrobatics, swimming, scuba diving, diving, then track and field.

After high school, she graduated from the Department of Russian Language and Literature at the Ion Creangă State Pedagogical University in Chișinău.

Since 1982 he has been an announcer on Chișinău television.

Since 1986, he has been an announcer for Soviet Central Television.

She appeared in the first season of ice show contest Ice Age.

== Awards ==
- Merited Artist of the Russian Federation (2004)
- Order of Friendship (2006)
