= Time Will Tell (talk show) =

- Presented by: Yekaterina Strizhenova; Anatoly Kuzichev (Since 2017); Artyom Sheynin; Peter Olegovich Tolstoy (Former)
- Country of origin: Russia
- Original language: Russian

Original release
- Network: Channel One Russia
- Release: September 15, 2014 – present

Time Will Tell (Вре́мя пока́жет, Vremya Pokazhet) is the main daytime political talk show that on Channel One Russia that premiered on September 15, 2014. The program discusses current news and events. Experts, politicians, political scientists, journalists and businessmen take part in the discussion held in the program’s studio.

The subject of the first episode was sanctions against Russia and the response taken by Russia's leadership. The television show covers topics in the current news cycle. Topics discussed in past programs is the war in Ukraine, the problem of domestic violence in Russia, consumer loans, drug prices, the investigation of the 2014 plane crash in Vnukovo and many other topics.

American journalist and former Moscow Times employee Michael Bohm often participates in the show. In October 2017, Artyom Sheinin attacked Bohm, grabbing the guest by the neck and threatening to use force Bohm said he “did not take offense” at Scheinin, for he considered the incident “arranged for the sake of the show” . The episode with the attack was cut by the TV channel from the published broadcast.

Since June 20, 2017, messages of users of the social network Twitter, sent to the program account, were broadcast every few minutes. The next month, the show was exposed by Vedomosti newspaper as using bots to pose as audience members on social media.

On June 26, 2018 Artyom Sheynin was punished by Channel One for swearing on television.

On 1 March 2022, it was reported that the country's media tries to show photos and videos from Ukraine that contradict official invasion accounts. On Channel One's Vremya Pokazhet (Time Will Tell), pundits and authorities discussed allegations that hundreds of Russian soldiers had been killed, indicating that such information could no longer be kept hidden from the public.

== Special editions ==
- Throughout the autumn of 2014, only the war in Ukraine was discussed during the second, foreign policy bloc section.
- Since 2014, special issues lasting two to three hours have been broadcast, dedicated to President Putin's message. This includes a press conference with Putin, and a direct call with him [24], immediately after the end of the live broadcast of these events. In addition, from 2016 at 11:00 there are issues that precede the straight line with Vladimir Putin, his message to the Federal Assembly of the Russian Federation and the press conference with him.
- February 28, 2015 at 7 pm a special edition was dedicated to the murder of the Russian politician Boris Nemtsov.
- September 28, 2015, twice that day the program discussed Vladimir Putin’s speech at the UN General Assembly.
- On September 18, 2016, from 9:41 pm, the program was devoted to the results of elections to the State Duma which included political scientists and public figures. The presenters were Artyom Sheinin and Valery Fadeev (at 0:55 he was replaced by Anatoly Kuzichev). The program was interrupted by the live broadcast of the hockey match at the World Cup between Russia and Sweden. The broadcast lasted until 2:07 am.
- On November 9, 2016, the program was entirely devoted to the results of the presidential elections in the United States, the topic was continued with two other special issues.
- On December 20, 2016, the program was completely devoted to the assassination of the Russian ambassador to Turkey.
- On April 3, 2017, the third part of the program from 3:20 pm was dedicated to the terrorist attack in the St. Petersburg metro.
- On July 7, 2017, are two special issues were released dedicated to the G-20 summit in Hamburg and the meeting of the presidents of Russia and the United States.
- On July 26, 2017 a special issue was aired on the new American sanctions against Russia. The release lasted from 6:30 pm to 7:50 pm.
- On December 5, 2017, a special issue was aired on the IOC’s decision on the participation of Russians in the Olympic Games under the Olympic flag. The release lasted from 9:55 pm to 11 p.m.
- On March 18, 2018, on the day of the presidential election in Russia, a large special issue was released from 7:50 pm to 0:46, in which the results of the election, entitled “Russia: Choosing the Future” (moderated by Artyom Sheinin and Ekaterina Strizhenova, who led the program until 9 p.m.). The program was interrupted for special issues of "News of the Channel One Russia" with Elena Vinnik, and later with Andrei Ukharev.
- On March 26, 2018, on the second day of the fire in the shopping center “Winter Cherry” in the city of Kemerovo from 3:15 pm to 4 p.m. there was a special issue dedicated to this topic. Also, all planned releases of the program from March 26 to 28 were devoted to this topic.
- On May 7, 2018, on the day of the inauguration of Russian President Vladimir Putin, a special issue dedicated to this topic was published from 3:15 pm to 4 p.m.
- On June 14, 2018, on the opening day of the Russian World Cup, there were issues dedicated to this topic from 12:15 to 3 p.m. and from 3:25 pm to 5 p.m.
- On July 16, 2018, from 6:50 pm to 8 p.m. there was a special issue dedicated to the meeting of Vladimir Putin and Donald Trump in Helsinki.
- On April 19, 2019, from 6:25 pm to 7:55 pm, a special issue was released dedicated to the debate of Ukrainian presidential candidates Volodymyr Zelensky and Petro Poroshenko.
- On May 6, 2019, from 5 p.m. to 6 p.m., a special issue was aired on the tragedy at Sheremetyevo Airport.
- On January 21, 2020 from 7:40 pm to 9 p.m. a special issue was aired on the announcement of the new composition of the Government of the Russian Federation.

== Awards ==
- TEFI Award for Day Talk Show - winner - 2017
- TEFI Award for Best Prime Time Political Talk Show Host - nominated - 2018
