= Ksenia Alfyorova =

Russian actress

- Ксения Алфёрова
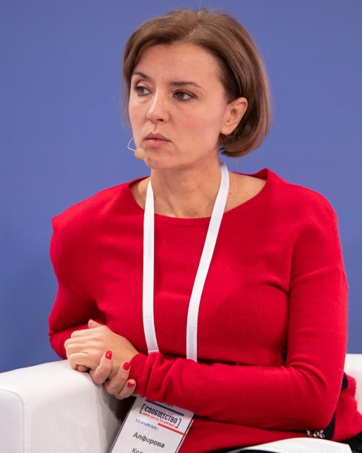
- Born: Ksenia Alexandrovna Alfyorova; 24 May 1974 (age 52); Sofia, Bulgaria
- Citizenship: Russia
- Occupation: Actress
- Years active: 1991–present

Ksenia Alexandrovna Alfyorova (Russian: Ксения Александровна Алфёрова; born 24 May 1974) is a Russian actress and television presenter.

== Early life ==
She was born on 24 May 1974, in Sofia, Bulgaria. She is the daughter of actress Irina Alfyorova and Boyko Gyurov, son of the Bulgarian politician Stoyan Gyurov, Ambassador of Bulgaria to the USSR). Until age 7, she lived with her grandmother Ksenia Arkhipovna Alferova in Novosibirsk. Until 16 she considered her stepfather, actor Aleksandr Abdulov, to be her father. Subsequently, she was adopted by Abdulov when he married Irina Alfyorova.

In 1992, she entered Moscow State Law Academy. In 2004, she graduated from the Moscow Art Theatre School (course of Yevgeny Kamenkovich).

== Career ==
She debuted in The Woman in White. She first appeared on television in the episode "Andersen's Tale" (1985) of the children's TV show Alarm Clock.

From 2000 to 2001, she was co-host of Vladimir Markin in the TV Bingo Show program on RTR, and from 26 December 2014, to 1 September 2017, she hosted the program Wait for Me on Channel One (replacing Maria Shukshina in this role).

She entered cinema in 2001. She took a leading role in the film by British director John Daly Petersburg-Cannes Express, where she played in English.

In 2008–2009, she participated in the Channel One projects Ice Age-2 (paired with figure skater Povilas Vanagas) and Ice Age-3 (paired with figure skater Peter Tchernyshev) In 2015, she took part in the show of the TV channel "Russia" Dancing with the Stars (paired with dancer Denis Tagintsev).

In 2012, together with her husband Egor Beroev, she founded the I Am! Charitable Foundation for Supporting Children with Developmental Disabilities, which works to change society's attitude towards people with developmental disabilities.
