= Egor Beroev =

Russian actor (born 1977)

- Егор Бероев
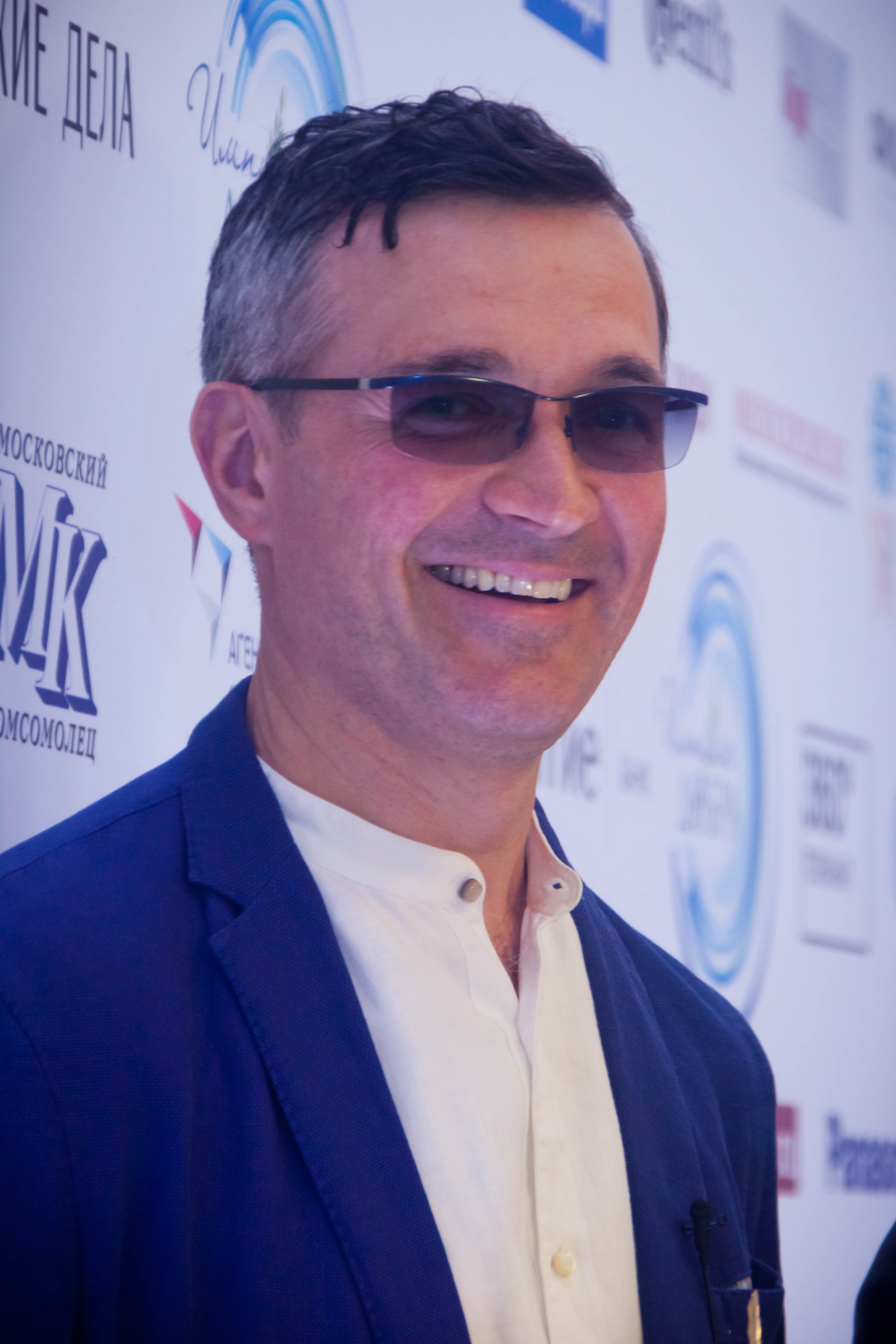
- Born: Egor Vadimovich Beroev; 9 October 1977 (age 49); Moscow, RSFSR, USSR
- Citizenship: Russia
- Education: Mikhail Shchepkin Higher Theatre School (Institute)
- Occupation: Actor
- Years active: 1994–present
- Spouse: Ksenia Alfyorova (m. 2001)
- Children: 1

Egor Vadimovich Beroev (Russian: Егор Вадимович Бероев; born 9 October 1977) is a Russian actor of film, television and theater. He appeared in more than thirty films since 1994.

== Career ==
Beroev was born in Moscow, Russian SFSR, Soviet Union. He graduated from the Mikhail Shchepkin Higher Theatre College in 1998. He is an actor in The Moscow Art Theatre (MKhAT).

From 12 September to 14 November 2014, he hosted the program Wait for Me together with Maria Shukshina.

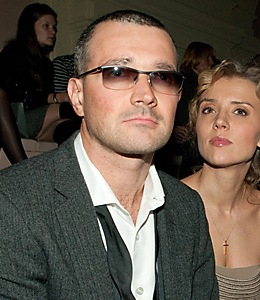
Egor Beroev and Kseniya Alfyorova in 2010.

He appeared in two seasons of ice show contest Ice Age.

== Personal life ==
Beroev has been married to Russian actress Ksenia Alfyorova since November 2001. They have one child, daughter Evdokiya, who was born on 5 April 2007. Evdokiya was born in Sicily, Italy, where Egor and Kseniya own a small vacation cottage.

Beroev is a supporter of the 2022 Russian invasion of Ukraine and performed on Russian TV in support of the invasion.

== Selected filmography ==
Year	Title	Role	Notes
1994	Dedication in Love	schoolboy	TV
2000	Rostov-Dad	Sergei	TV series
2001	Citizen Chief	Andrey	TV series
2001	Family Secrets	Slava Ermakov, owner of the club	TV series
2002	Railway Romance	Alexey	TV
2003	Wild Herd	Dmitriy	
2004	Daddy	David Schwartz	
2005	Kazaroza	Osipov	Mini-series
2005	The Turkish Gambit	Erast Fandorin	
2008	Admiral	Mikhail Smirnov	
2008	White Bear	Pavel Vasilkov	
2009	Landing Forces	Andrey Sumarokov, lieutenant	TV series
2009	The Man Who Knew Everything	Alexander Bezukladnikov	
2011	Rader	Artem Pavlov, lawyer	
2012	August Eighth	Zaur/Kind Robot	
2012	Waiting for the Sea	Marat	
2012	Moms	Viktor	
2015	Territory	Vladimir Mongolov	
2015	Happiness is...	driver	
2015	Because of Love	Andrey Gavryushov	TV series
2015	Anna Karenina	Stiva Oblonsky	
2016	Santa Claus. Battle of the Magi	Masha's father	
2023	Forgotten Experiment	Professor Henry Blake	
