= Railway Romance =

- Russian: Железнодорожный романс
- Directed by: Ivan Solovov
- Written by: Aleksandr Detkov
- Produced by: Marianna Balashova; Aleksandr Krylov
- Starring: Egor Beroev; Olga Budina; Aleksey Frandetti; Nina Grebeshkova; Leonid Kuravlyov; Aleksandr Semchev
- Music by: Ilya Dukhovnyy
- Release date: 2002
- Country: Russia
- Language: Russian

Railway Romance (Russian: Железнодорожный романс) is a 2002 Russian drama film directed by Ivan Solovov.

== Plot ==
The film tells about a good Muscovite named Alexei, who meets a girl. They agree on a date, but as a result, Alexei loses his job and apartment. Various troubles begin to occur regularly with him and now, many years later, on the eve of the New Year, he meets her again.

== Cast ==
- Egor Beroev as Aleksei
- Olga Budina as Vera
- Aleksey Frandetti
- Nina Grebeshkova as Vera's Mother
- Leonid Kuravlyov as Petrovich
- Aleksandr Semchev as Valeriy Semyonovich
