= Tatiana Tarasova =

Russian figure skating coach and adviser

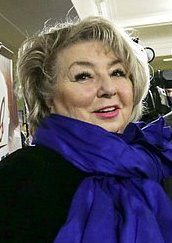
- Tarasova in 2018

Personal information
- Native name: Татьяна Анатольевна Тарасова
- Full name: Tatiana Anatolyevna Tarasova
- Born: 13 February 1947 (age 79)

Figure skating career
- Country: Soviet Union; Russia
- Retired: 1966

Tatiana Anatolyevna Tarasova (Russian: Татьяна Анатольевна Тарасова; born 13 February 1947) is a Russian figure skating coach and national figure skating team adviser. Tarasova has been coach to more world and Olympic champions than any other coach in skating history. Her students have won a total of eight Olympic gold medals in three of the four Olympic figure skating disciplines, in addition to 41 gold medals at the European and World championships.

== Biography ==
Tatiana Tarasova was born on February 13, 1947 in Moscow, in the family of Anatoly Tarasov, a famed ice hockey coach, who introduced her to figure skating at the age of five.

She lived for more than a decade in Simsbury, Connecticut before moving back to Russia in 2006. She is the widow of Vladimir Krainev, who died in April 2011.

== Competitive career ==
At the All-Union Junior Individual and Team Competition held in Kyiv in March 1961, 14-year-old Tatyana Tarasova, pair skating with Alexander Tikhomirov and representing the Trud sports society, placed second in the first-class category. The pair of Tatyana Tarasova and Georgi Proskurin was briefly coached by Elena Tchaikovskaia. With Proskurin, she was a two-time Soviet national medalist. They finished 7th at the 1965 World Championships and 4th at the 1966 European Championships. Shortly thereafter, she was forced to end her competitive career due to an injury at the age of 18.

== Results ==
with Georgi Proskurin:

International
Event	63–64	64–65	65–66
Worlds		7th	
Europeans		6th	4th
Prague Skate		3rd	
Winter Universiade			1st
National
Soviet Champ.	3rd	2nd	

== Later career ==
Tarasova started coaching at age 19, at her father's insistence. Her most notable students have been Alexei Yagudin, Ilia Kulik, Natalia Bestemianova / Andrei Bukin, Oksana Grishuk / Evgeni Platov, Ekaterina Gordeeva / Sergei Grinkov, Marina Klimova / Sergey Ponomarenko, and Irina Rodnina / Alexander Zaitsev.

In 1974, she entered the Institute of Physical Culture, from which she graduated in 1979.

In the mid-1980s, Tarasova launched the Russian All-Stars, an ice ballet. She coached for ten years at Simsbury, Connecticut's International Skating Center before announcing her retirement from full-time coaching and moving back to Russia in 2006.

In 2001, Tarasova published an autobiographical book titled Beauty and the Beast.

In 2005, Tarasova was appointed consultant coach for the Figure Skating Federation of Russia.

She served as the head judge for several television shows on Channel One Russia, including Stars on Ice (2006), Ice Age (from 2007 to 2009 and since 2012), and Ice and Fire (from 2010 to 2011). Since April 1, 2018, she has been the head judge of the television project Ice Age. Kids.

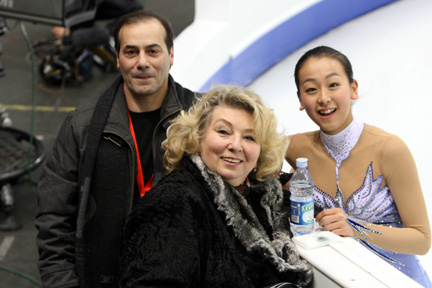
Rafael Arutyunyan, Mao Asada and Tatiana Tarasova at the Grand Prix of Figure Skating Final, December, 2007

On March 21, 2008, during the World Figure Skating Championships in Gothenburg, Tarasova was inducted into the World Figure Skating Hall of Fame.

In the summer of the same year, 2008 world champion Mao Asada of Japan began training under Tarasova’s guidance. Asada continued to train at her university base in Nagoya, visiting Tatyana Anatolyevna in Moscow periodically. Tarasova, in turn, occasionally visited the athlete in Japan and accompanied her to major competitions. After the 2010 Winter Olympic Games, where Mao won the silver medal, and the World Championships, which she won, their cooperation came to an end.

In the winter of 2011, under Tarasova’s direction, an ice theatre production based on Charles Perrault’s fairy tale Sleeping Beauty was staged.

As a coach, Tatyana Anatolyevna Tarasova has participated in every Winter Olympic Games, World, and European Figure Skating Championship since 1967. A notorious chain smoker, Tarasova was known for smoking cigarettes during her coaching sessions.

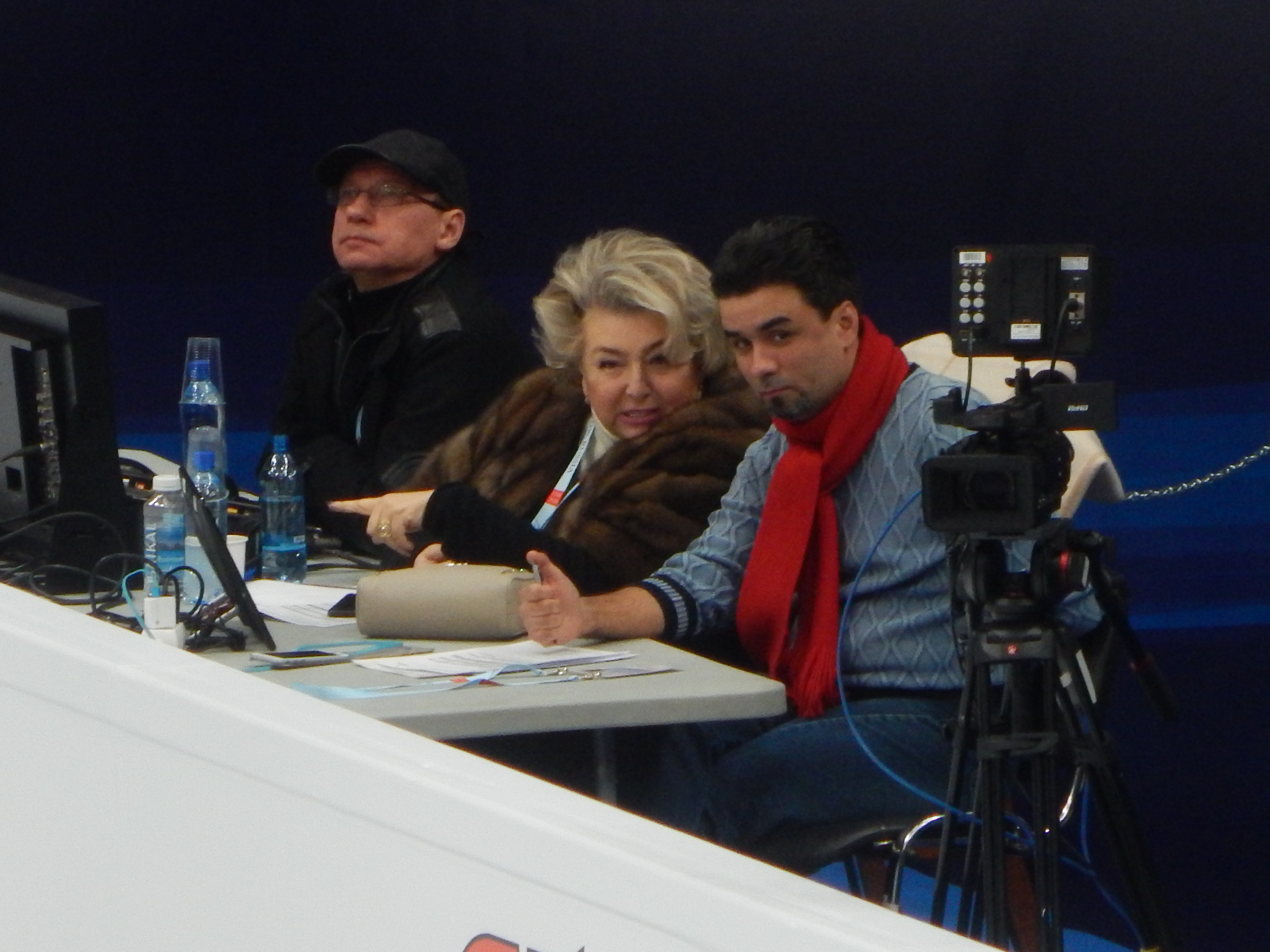
At the European Figure Skating Championships. Moscow, Megasport Sports Palace, January 17, 2018

Until 2020, she provided commentary on figure skating events for Channel One Russia (in tandem with Alexandr Grishin) and the Match TV channel.

=== Students ===
- Mao Asada: She coached Asada from 2008 until 2010. Asada won the 2010 World title and 2010 Olympic silver medal under Tarasova. Tarasova continued to choreograph for her.
- Eteri Tutberidze: Eteri trained under her for a year during the 1991-1992 season before deciding to perform on ice shows
- Shizuka Arakawa: Led her to win the World Championships in 2004 and Olympic gold medal in 2006 together with Nikolai Morozov.
- Maxim Kovtun: Coached and choreographed his programs starting 2012.
- Natalia Bestemianova / Andrei Bukin: Led them to four World Championships and the Olympic gold medal in 1988.
- Artem Borodulin: Coached him and choreographed programs for him.
- Shae-Lynn Bourne / Victor Kraatz: Coached 2000–2002 with Nikolai Morozov
- Galit Chait / Sergei Sakhnovski: Coached 1999–2001 with Nikolai Morozov.
- Sasha Cohen: Coached her from 2002 until 2004. Was also her choreographer.
- Annette Dytrt: Choreographed programs for her.
- Barbara Fusar-Poli / Maurizio Margaglio: Coached 1997–2002.
- Elene Gedevanishvili. Has worked with her during multiple periods of her career.
- Timothy Goebel: Choreographed multiple programs for him.
- Oksana Grishuk / Evgeni Platov: Led them to win 1997 World Championship and an Olympic gold medal in 1998.
- Ekaterina Gordeeva / Sergei Grinkov: Coached in first professional time period 1990–1992.
- Brian Joubert: choreographed his programs in the 2004-5 season.
- Marina Klimova / Sergey Ponomarenko: Led them to 1992 World Championships and the Olympic gold medal.
- Ilia Kulik: Was also his choreographer. Led him to win the Olympic gold medal in 1998.
- Michelle Kwan: Choreographed her short and free programs for the 2005-6 season.
- Evan Lysacek: Choreographed multiple programs for him.
- Kevin Reynolds: Choreographed some of his programs.
- Irina Rodnina / Alexander Zaitsev: Led them to win four World Championships 1975–1978 and two Olympic gold medals in 1976 and 1980.
- Adelina Sotnikova: Choreographed her programs.
- Denis Ten: Worked with him during periods of his career as well as choreographed programs for him.
- Sergei Voronov: Choreographed programs for him.
- Johnny Weir: Choreographed multiple programs for him.
- Alexei Yagudin: Coached and choreographed him from 1998 to his retirement in 2003. Led him to three World Championships and an Olympic gold medal in 2002.

Tarasova is assisted by choreographer Jeanetta Folle.

== Views ==
In April 2001, Tarasova spoke out in support of the journalistic staff of the NTV television company, who were protesting against the appointment of new management.

In 2022, Tarasova reacted sharply and negatively to a proposal by State Duma deputy Roman Teryushkov, who suggested equating the change of citizenship by Russian athletes with treason, calling him "a piece of an idiot".

In March 2023, Tarasova lashed out at Canadian athletes who signed a petition calling for a continuation of the ban on Russian athletes amidst the Russo-Ukrainian War:

We do not care if they don't want to see us. It always seemed to me that Canadians are a friendly, non-violent nation, they never showed themselves that way [negatively]. But here they can be understood – of course, they want to win, including in figure skating, at least something in [ice] dance. They don't need more competition. There is no other way to explain this statement. I don't want to believe that Tessa [Virtue] is an evil and unfair person. And I also think that we will participate in the [2026 Winter Olympic] Games.

== Family and personal life ==
Father — Anatoly Tarasov (1918–1995), Honored Coach of the USSR. Mother — Nina Grigoryevna Tarasova (1918–2010), instructor in athletics and skiing.

Sister — Galina Tarasova (married name Skuratovskaya; 1941–2009), teacher of Russian language and literature at Moscow schools.

Nephew — Alexey Igorevich Tarasov (born 1968), president of the All-Russian Young Hockey Players’ Club "Golden Puck" named after A. V. Tarasov.

Grandnephews — Fyodor and Matvey.

Tatiana Tarasova was married three times; her husbands were:

- Alexey Samoylov (born 1945) — actor, son of People’s Artist of the USSR Yevgeny Samoylov. The marriage lasted two years.
- Vasily Khomenkov (1947–1976) — track and field athlete, son of Soviet sportsman, coach, and official Leonid Khomenkov.
- Vladimir Krainev (1944–2011) — pianist, People’s Artist of the USSR (1990).

She had no children.

== Honours and awards ==
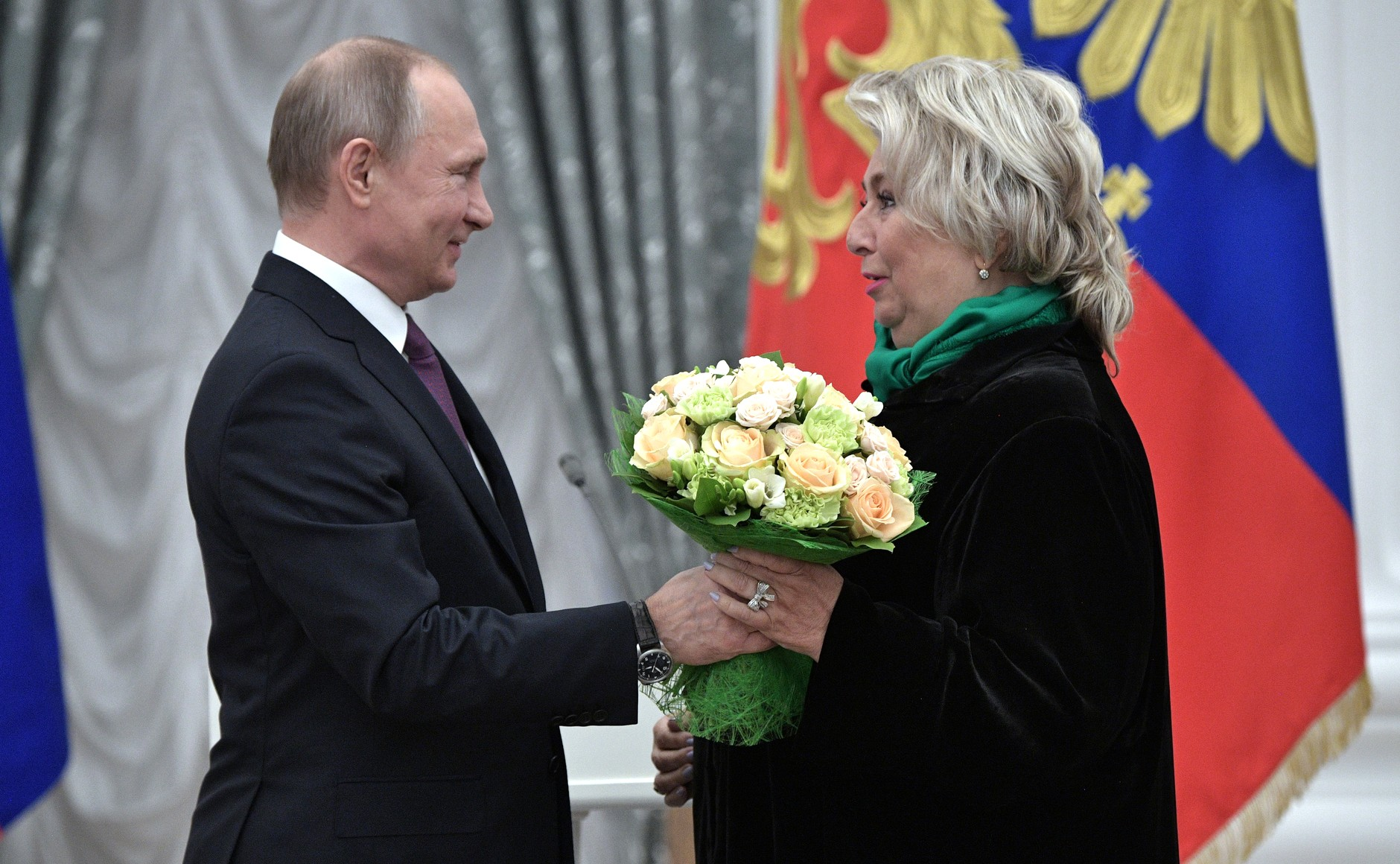
Award of the Order of Merit for the Fatherland, IV degree. May 24, 2017

- Order of Merit for the Fatherland, 3rd class (27 February 1998) – for outstanding athletic achievement at the XVIII Olympic Winter Games in 1998;
- Order of Honour (13 February 2007) – for outstanding contribution to the development of physical culture and sport and many years of fruitful activity;
- Order of the Red Banner of Labour, twice.
- Order of the Badge of Honour (1976);
- Order of Friendship of Peoples (1984);
- Honoured coach of the USSR (1975);
- Honoured coach of the RSFSR (1972);
- Honoured Artist of the RSFSR;
- Master of Sports of the USSR of international class;
- In March 2008, Tarasove was inducted into the World Figure Skating Hall of Fame.
