= Ivan Hristov Bashev =

Bulgarian diplomat

- Иван Христов Башев

Minister of Foreign Affairs of Bulgaria
- In office 27 November 1962 – 13 December 1971
- Preceded by: Karlo Lukanov
- Succeeded by: Petar Mladenov

Deputy Minister of Foreign Affairs
- In office 1961–1962

Personal details
- Born: 11 February 1916; Sofia, Bulgaria
- Died: 13 December 1971 (aged 55); Vitosha, near Sofia

Ivan Hristov Bashev (Bulgarian: Иван Христов Башев) (11 February 1916 – 13 December 1971) was a Bulgarian diplomat and Foreign Minister of Bulgaria from 1962 to 1971. Bashev headed the Ministry of Foreign Affairs until his death on 13 December 1971 and is considered one of the "most remarkable foreign ministers of Bulgaria".

== Biography ==
Bashev was born on 11 February 1916 in Sofia, Bulgaria. A lawyer by education, he was editor-in-chief of the national daily Narodna Mladezh from 1944 to 1946. He joined the Bulgarian Communist Party in late 1946 and was elected to the party's central committee in 1962.

In 1956, Bashev was appointed Deputy Minister of Education followed by an appointment as Deputy Minister of Foreign Affairs. In 1962, he became Foreign Minister for the new government that was formed by Todor Zhivkov after the fall of the Anton Yugov government and the defeat of the Stalinist and pro-Chinese Communist Party faction headed by Vulko Chervenkov. In 1966, Zhivkov reorganized his government, yet Bashev was allowed to retain his post. When the Stanko Todorov cabinet was formed in July 1971, he again was allowed to keep his post.

Bashev was instrumental in reestablishing relations between Bulgaria and Denmark. On 7 April 1968 he became the first Eastern Bloc Foreign Minister to visit Reykjavík, Iceland. His visits were instrumental in the elimination of the visa regime between Bulgaria and Denmark, Norway, and Iceland.

On 13 December 1971 Bashev was found frozen to death. According to a Foreign Ministry statement, he had been caught in a sudden snowstorm while skiing alone on mount Vitosha near Sofia. He had apparently fallen, been injured, and died of hypothermia and exhaustion before being found by the mountain rescue service.

== See also ==
- Foreign relations of Bulgaria

Political offices
Preceded by Karlo Lukanov	Foreign Minister of Bulgaria; 27 November 1962 –13 December 1971	Succeeded by Petar Mladenov
