= Navka Arena =

Indoor ice complex in Moscow, Russia

- Interactive map of Navka Arena
- Address: Moscow, Nizhni Mnevniki str., 10A
- Location: Khoroshyovo-Mnyovniki District, Moscow, Russia
- Coordinates: 55°44′39″N 37°27′14″E
- Owner: Moscow City Sports Department
- Capacity: 2,025

Construction
- Built: July 2022
- Opened: 30 January 2025

Website
- https://navkaarena.ru/

The Navka Arena (Russian: Навка Арена) is a multi-purpose indoor ice complex in Moscow, Russia. Opened in 2025 and was named in honor of Olympic figure skating champion Tatyana Navka. The venue accommodates up to 2,025 spectators and is used for sports competitions, training, and cultural events.

== History ==
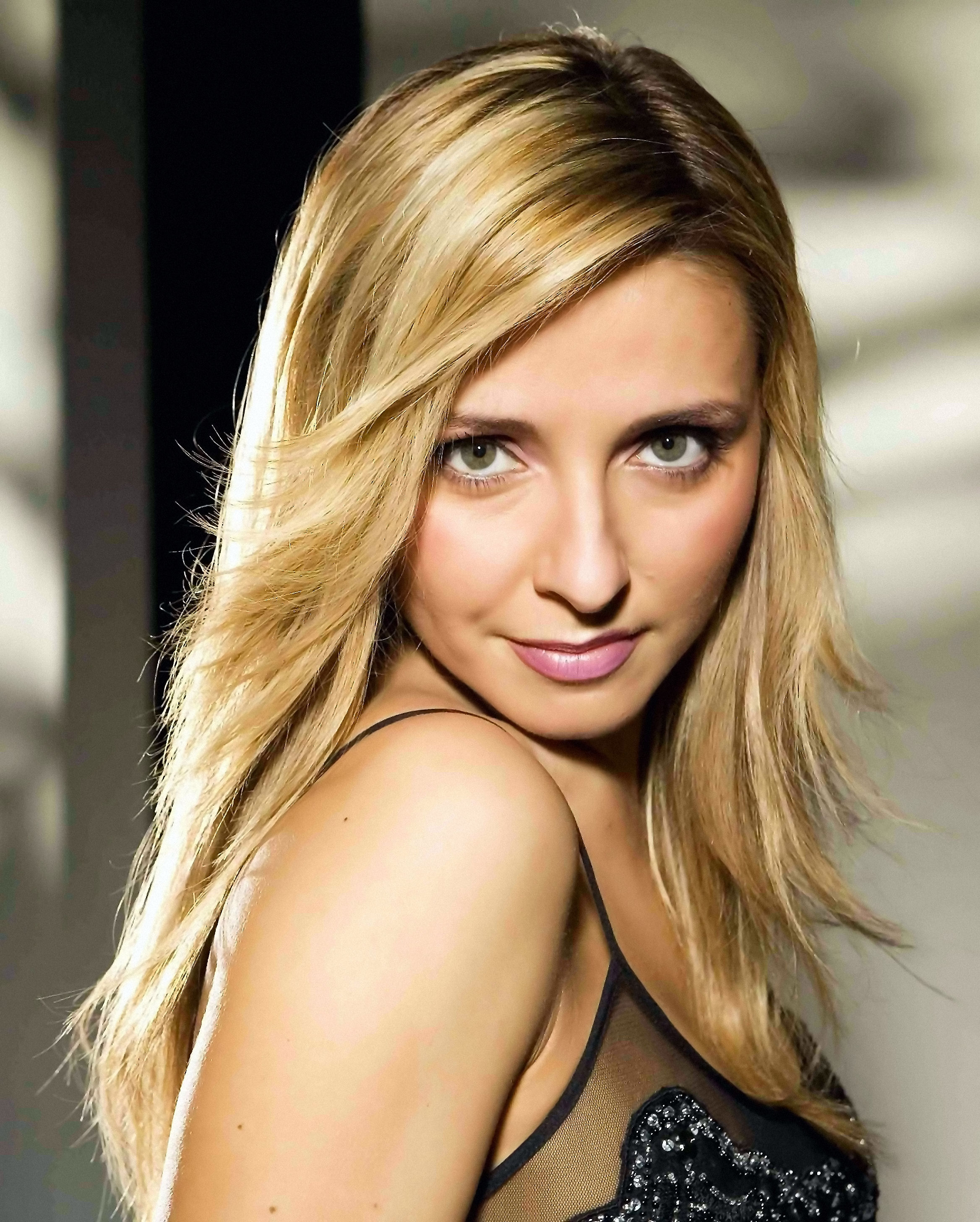
Tatyana Navka, after whom the arena was named

The facility was built on the initiative of the Moscow government as a custom-designed project developed together with Tatyana Navka. Permission for construction was granted in 2019, and the works took place over two and a half years, starting in July 2022 and finishing in December 2024. The arena was funded entirely through the city budget.

The arena is situated in the Khoroshyovo-Mnyovniki District of Moscow's North-Western Administrative Okrug, on an artificial island in the Mnyovnikovskaya floodplain, within the residential quarter Ostrov. One of the building's distinctive design elements is a canopy resembling a skate blade, decorated with a perforated image of a figure skater and patterns reminiscent of skating traces on ice.

The official opening took place on 30 January 2025, with Moscow Mayor Sergey Sobyanin and Tatyana Navka participating in the ceremony.

The total floor area of the complex is 20,600 m^{2}. It includes a main ice rink measuring 60×26 m with seating for 2,025 people and a secondary training rink sized 60×30 m. Both ice surfaces meet the standards of the International Skating Union (ISU) and the International Ice Hockey Federation (IIHF).

The venue also features a martial arts hall with a boxing ring, punching bags, and fitness equipment; a padel tennis court; a gym; a multipurpose sports hall; the rhythmic gymnastics center "Academy of the First" (Russian: Академия Первых); two dance studios; and a conditioning hall equipped with gymnastic rings and wall bars. Additional amenities include guest rooms under the IceLand hotel brand, a café, a laundry service, and a Navka Sport retail store. The surrounding area is equipped with car parking.

== Activities ==
The main resident organizations are the figure skating academy "Our Hopes" (Russian: Наши надежды) and the theatrical company "Navka Show", which train athletes and stage ice performances. As of 2025, training is also conducted by the group of Honored Coach of Russia Svetlana Sokolovskaya, which includes European champion and Olympic medalist Mark Kondratyuk. Both commercial and free classes for children and adults are offered in figure skating, ice hockey, dance, and padel tennis.

The rhythmic gymnastics center "Academy of the First" also operates at the arena, while the dance halls are used for lessons in choreography, pilates, and yoga. The multipurpose hall accommodates basketball, volleyball, handball, futsal, and badminton, and the martial arts hall hosts boxing as well as group and individual classes in TRX, cycling, and crossfit.

Navka Arena regularly hosts sports competitions and cultural events. Among them are the ice performance "The Scarlet Flower", featuring Pyotr Chernyshev, Maxim Kovtun, Elizaveta Khudaiberdieva, Egor Bazin, and Alexei Tikhonov, the Moscow fitness festival FitExpo, and the figure skating finals of Battle of Schools 2025.
