= Yulia Zimina =

Russian actress (born 1981)

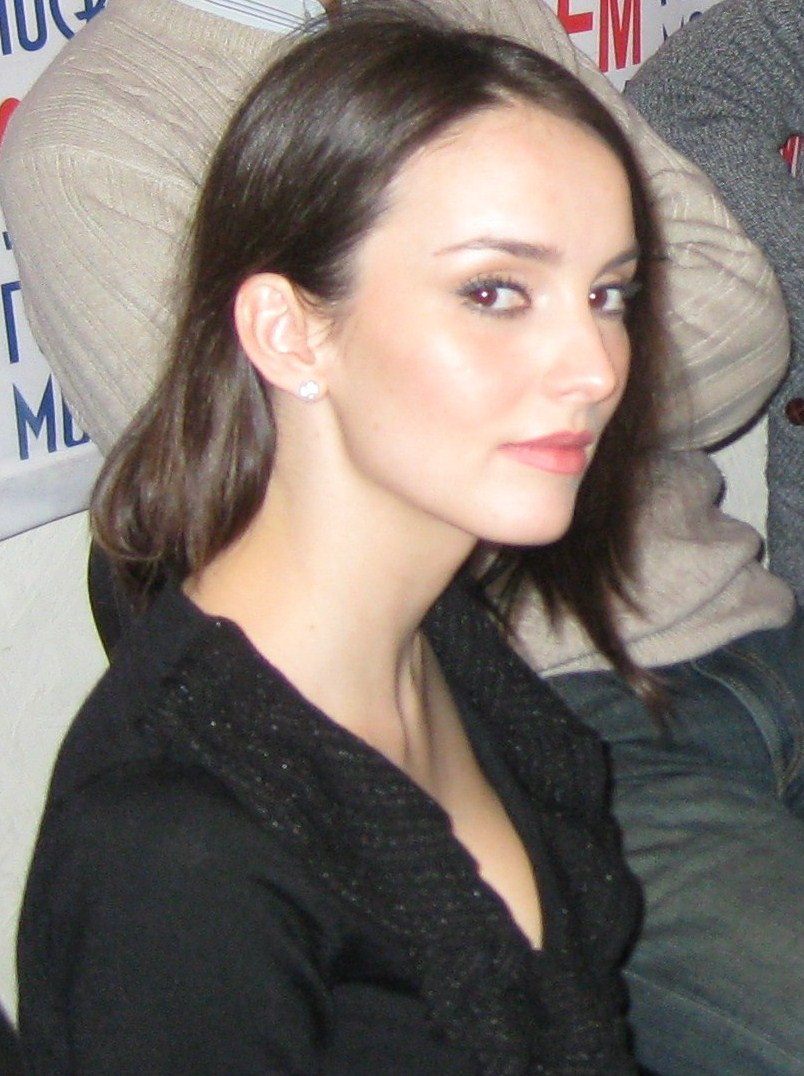
- Born: Yulia Alexandrovna Zimina; 4 July 1981 (age 45); Krasny Kut, Saratov Oblast, Russian SFSR, Soviet Union
- Education: Saratov Conservatory
- Occupations: actress, television presenter
- Years active: 2005 — present
- Height: 5 ft 5 in (165 cm)

Yulia Alexandrovna Zimina (Russian: Ю́лия Алекса́ндровна Зимина́; born July 4, 1981, Krasny Kut, Saratov Oblast) is a Russian film actress and TV presenter.

== Biography ==
On July 4, 1981, Zimina was born in the town of Krasny Kut, Saratov Oblast. Zimina's father is Alexander Petrovich, a veterinary doctor. Zimina's mother is Zoya Grigorievna, a school teacher.

From the second grade, Zimina studied at a music school, which she graduated perfectly well. In childhood she decided to become an actress. In 1999, Zimina entered the actors department of the Saratov Conservatory (course of Rimma Belyakova). In 2003, Zimina graduated from school, playing several roles in graduation performances.

In 2004, among 200 contenders, director Rauf Kubayev chose Zimina to become the main role in television series Karmelita (Russia 1).

In 2006, as part of the Russian team, Zimina took part in the television game Fort Boyard.

Since August 4, 2010, Zimina is the host of the Good Morning program on Channel One Russia, replacing Alexander Mirzayan.

In 2010–2013, Zimina met with actor Maxim Shchyogolev.

In the spring of 2015, she gave birth to a daughter, Simona.
