= Andrey Golovanov =

Russian sports reporter and television commentator

Andrey Yurievich Golovanov (Russian: Андр́ей Юрьевич Голова́нов; born October 3, 1974, Moscow) is a Russian sports reporter and television commentator.

== Biography ==
In journalism since 1991, and on television since 1994. He also worked on the canals Seven TV (2003-2010) and Eurosport-Russia. Since 1994 - a sports writer and commentator First Channel.

Its main profiling sports: football, ice hockey and figure skating. There is also summer and winter Olympic Games, world championships in hockey (2010 and 2011) and figure skating. As a football commentator worked at five World Championships (1998, 2002, 2006, 2010, 2014) and three European championships (2000, 2008, 2012).

In 2010-2013 he was a commentator on children's programs on the TV channel Carousel.

He also collaborates with the TV channel Eurosport 1. Commented mainly on the luge. Since the fall of 2016 is one of the main commentators of the matches of the NHL on Eurosport 1.
