= Artyom Sheynin =

Russian television presenter

Artyom Sheinin
- Артём Шейнин
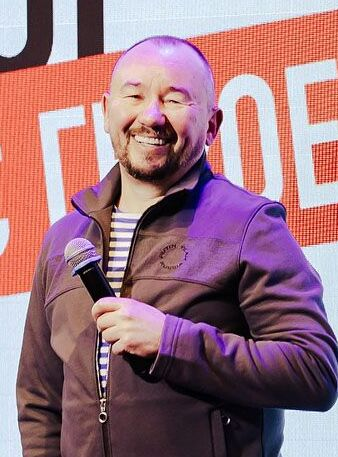
- Sheynin in 2025
- Born: January 26, 1966 (age 60); Moscow, Soviet Union
- Occupations: TV presenter, propagandist

Artyom Grigoryevich Sheynin (Russian: Артём Григорьевич Шейнин; born 26 January 1966) is a Russian journalist and propagandist. He has been alleged to serve as a government. He worked as a TV presenter and as First Deputy Director of the Directorate of Social and Journalistic Programs of JSC Channel One. From August 2016 (with a break from January to April 2017) — he hosted Time Will Tell. Since 2008, he served as manager of the show with Vladimir Pozner as host. From January 23 to July 20, 2017, he hosted talk show First Studio.

== Career ==
From 1984 to 1986 he served in the military. He was a participant in the Soviet–Afghan War as a sergeant of 56th Guards Air Assault Brigade.

In 1993 graduated from MSU Faculty of History. In 1996 he worked as anthropologist in Sakhalin and Chukchi Peninsula.

In 2007–2010, took part in television voice-over for documentaries for Discovery and TV shows for 2x2.

In 2008 received the Gratitude of the President of the Russian Federation (April 23, 2008 a) — "for information support and active public activities for the development of civil society in the Russian Federation".

In 2016 become a host of Time Will Tell TV show.

=== Sanctions ===
He was sanctioned by the UK government in 2022 in relation to the Russo-Ukrainian War.

== Personal life ==
He remarried after divorcing his first wife and has three children.
