= Dmitry Borisov (anchorman) =

Russian journalist

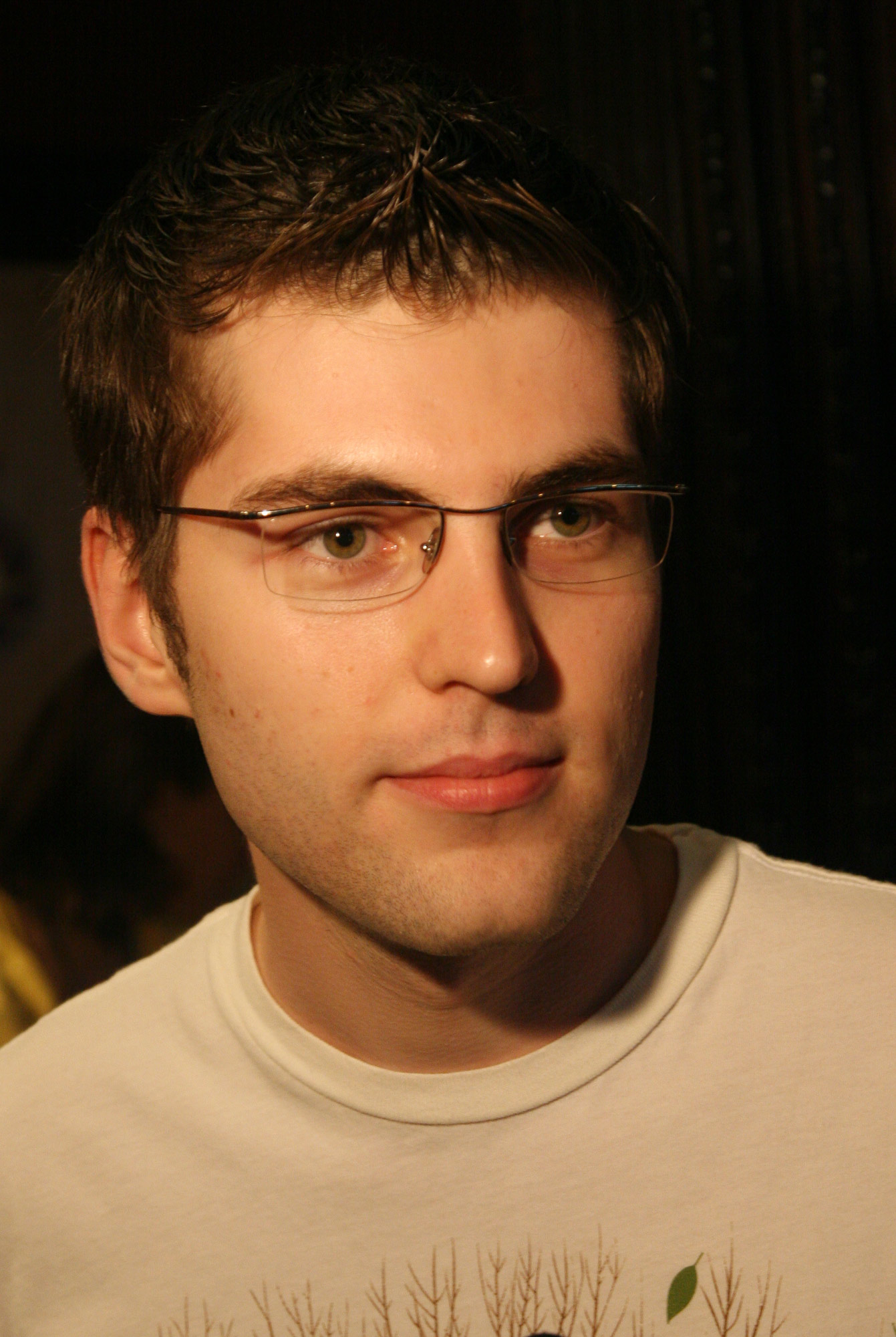
- Born: Dmitry Dmitriyevich Borisov; August 15, 1985 (age 41); Chernivtsi, Ukrainian SSR, Soviet Union
- Education: Russian State University for the Humanities

Dmitry Dmitriyevich Borisov (Russian: Дми́трий Дми́триевич Бори́сов; born August 15, 1985, Chernivtsi, Ukrainian SSR) is a Russian journalist, TV host on Channel One Russia, a Runet activist, producer of documentary projects and (since 2015) chief executive producer of Channel One Russia Worldwide. He has won a TEFI award as the best TV news presenter (2016, 2017).

== Career ==
He started work for the radio station Echo of Moscow when he was 16 (2001). In 2006 he joined Channel One Russia as a news anchor.

In 2008, he was awarded the Channel One prize for best TV presenter.

From 2011 until August 2017, he hosted The Evening News and Vremya.

He was one of the Sochi Games torchbearers 2014 Winter Olympics torch relay.

In 2014, for his contribution to the preparation and holding of the XXII Olympic Winter Games in Sochi awarded Medal of the Order "For Merit to the Fatherland" 1st class.
