= Andrey Malakhov =

Russian television personality and presenter (born 1972)

- Андрей Малахов
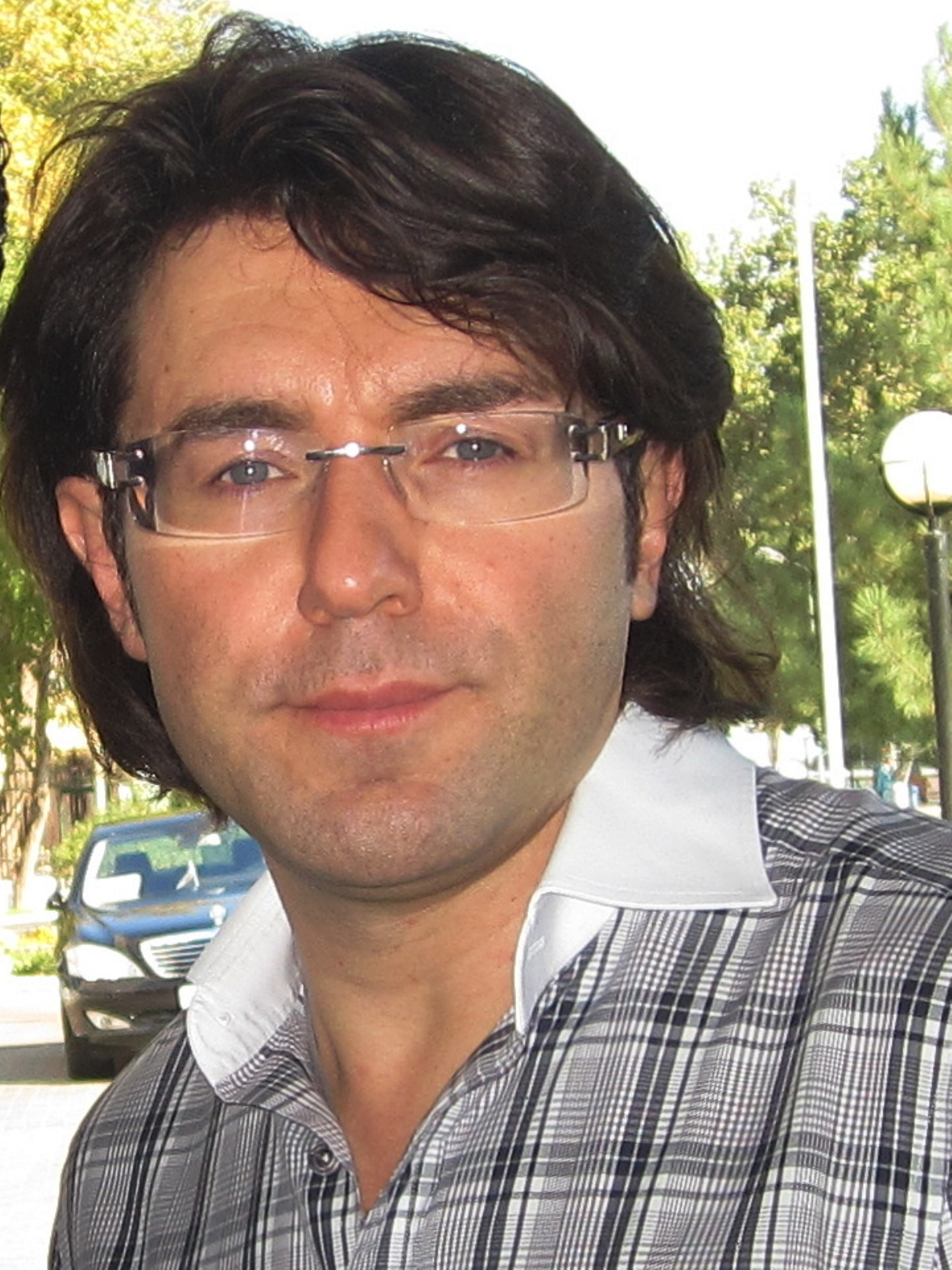
- Andrey Malakhov in 2011
- Born: Andrey Nikolayevich Malakhov; 11 January 1972 (age 54); Apatity, Murmansk Oblast, RSFSR, USSR
- Education: Moscow State University; Michigan State University; Russian State University for the Humanities
- Occupations: TV presenter; journalist; showman; actor; writer; radio host; teacher; editor; television producer
- Years active: 1992–present

Andrey Nikolayevich Malakhov (Russian: Андре́й Никола́евич Мала́хов; born 11 January 1972) is a Russian television personality and presenter on the main Russian television channel, Russia-1.

== Biography ==
Malakhov was born in the town of Apatity, Murmansk Oblast, Russian SFSR, Soviet Union, and studied violin at music school.

In 1995 he graduated from the Faculty of Journalism of the Moscow State University, before studying for one and a half years at Michigan State University. During these studies worked on the newspaper Moskovskiye Novosti and broadcast the show Стиль (Style) on Radio Maximum.

He publishes a magazine and website of the same name, StarHit.

In 1998 entered the faculty of law of the Russian State University for the Humanities and since graduating has worked there, teaching the basics of journalism.

== Career ==
Malakhov has hosted the talk show Let Them Talk from July 2001 to 2017.

In May 2009, Malakhov presented the semifinals of the 2009 Eurovision Song Contest with the Russian model Natalia Vodianova.

=== Television ===
- 1992: worked at The Sunday with Sergey Alekseev
- 1995: editor of the international informational program Morning and the presenter of the show Style
- 1996–2001: the show Good Morning on Channel One
- 2001–2004: talk show The Big Washing
- 2004–2007: the music show Golden Gramophone
- 2004–2005: talk show Five Evenings
- 2005–2017: talk show Lets Them Talk
- April–May, 2006: the show about folk medicine Malakhov+Malakhov (together with his namesake Gennady Malakhov)
- 2005–2007: broadcast Golden Gramophone on Russkoe Radio
- 2008: TV show TV star — Superstar on Ukrainian TV
- 2008: the show Two Stars, together with Masha Rasputina (as a participant)
- 2010–2011: the show Lie Detector
- 2012–2017: the Saturday talk show Tonight
- since 2017 TV show “Live with Andrey Malakhov”
- since 2017 the Saturday talk show “Hello, Andrey!”

=== Filmography ===
Malakhov made cameo appearances as himself in the following films:

- 2007: Kilometer Zero
- 2007: Indigo
- 2007: Happy Together
- 2009: Daddy's Daughters
- 2011: Exchange Wedding
- 2015: The Very Best Day
- 2019: Serf

== Awards ==
- Medal of the Order "For Merit to the Fatherland" 2nd class (2006)

== Personal life ==
In June 2011, Malakhov married Natalia Shkuleva (born 31 May 1980), a publisher of magazine Elle by Hearst Shkulev Digital (Russian edition). They married in the Palace of Versailles. In August 2017, the couple announced that they are expecting their first child.

== See also ==
- List of Eurovision Song Contest presenters

| Preceded by (Serbia) Jovana Janković and Željko Joksimović | Eurovision Song Contest presenter 2009; With: Natalia Vodianova (Semi-finals) | Succeeded by (Norway) Nadia Hasnaoui, Haddy Jatou N'jie and Erik Solbakken |
