= List of ambassadors of Bulgaria to Russia =

The following is a list of ambassadors of Bulgaria to the Russian Empire, Soviet Union and the Russian Federation:

== Russian Empire ==
- Konstantin Stoilov - Diplomatic Agent in Saint Petersburg – 1883
- Dimiter Stancioff - Diplomatic Agent in Saint Petersburg – 1897–1906
- Stefan Paprikov - Diplomatic Agent in Saint Petersburg – 1906; Minister Plenipotentiary in Saint Petersburg 1910–1912
- Dimiter Tsokov - Diplomatic Agent and Minister Plenipotentiary in Saint Petersburg 1908–1909
- Stefan Bobchev - Minister Plenipotentiary in Saint Petersburg 1912–1913
- Radko Dimitriev - Minister Plenipotentiary in Saint Petersburg 1913–1914
- Michail Madjarov - Minister Plenipotentiary in Saint Petersburg 1914–1915

== Soviet Union ==
- Stefan Chaprashikov - Minister Plenipotentiary in Soviet Russia 1918
- Nikola Antonov - Minister Plenipotentiary in Moscow 1936-1939
- Todor Christov - Minister Plenipotentiary in Moscow 1940
- Ivan Stamenov - Minister Plenipotentiary in Moscow 1940-1941
- Dimiter Mihalchev - Minister Plenipotentiary in Moscow 1934-1936; Political Representative and Minister Plenipotentiary in Moscow 1944-1946
- Nayden Kourdalanov - Minister Plenipotentiary in Moscow 1946; Ambassador to the USSR 1948-1949
- Stella Blagoeva - Ambassador to the USSR 1949-1954
- Karlo Lukanov - Ambassador to the USSR 1954-1956
- Lyuben Nikolov - Ambassador to the USSR 1956-1963
- Stoyan Karadjov - Ambassador in Moscow 1963-1967
- Stoyan Ivanov - Ambassador in Moscow 1967-1973
- Dimiter Zhulev - Ambassador in Moscow 1973-1986
- Georgi Pankov - Ambassador Extraordinary and Plenipotentiary in Moscow 1986-1990
- Vladimir Velchev - Ambassador in the USSR and the Russian Federation 1991-1992

== Russian Federation ==
- Vladimir Velchev - Ambassador in the USSR and the Russian Federation 1991-1992
- Volodya Neykov - Minister Plenipotentiary in Moscow 1992-1994
- Hristo Miladinov - Ambassador in the Russian Federation 1994-1997
- Vassiliy Takev - Ambassador in Moscow 1997-2000
- Ilian Vassilev - Ambassador Extraordinary and Plenipotentiary in Moscow 2000-2006
- Plamen Grozdanov - Ambassador in Moscow 2006-2012
- George Gergov - Ambassador in Moscow 2006-2019

== See also ==
- Bulgaria–Russia relations
- List of ambassadors of Russia to Bulgaria
