= Yekaterina Strizhenova =

Russian actress and TV host

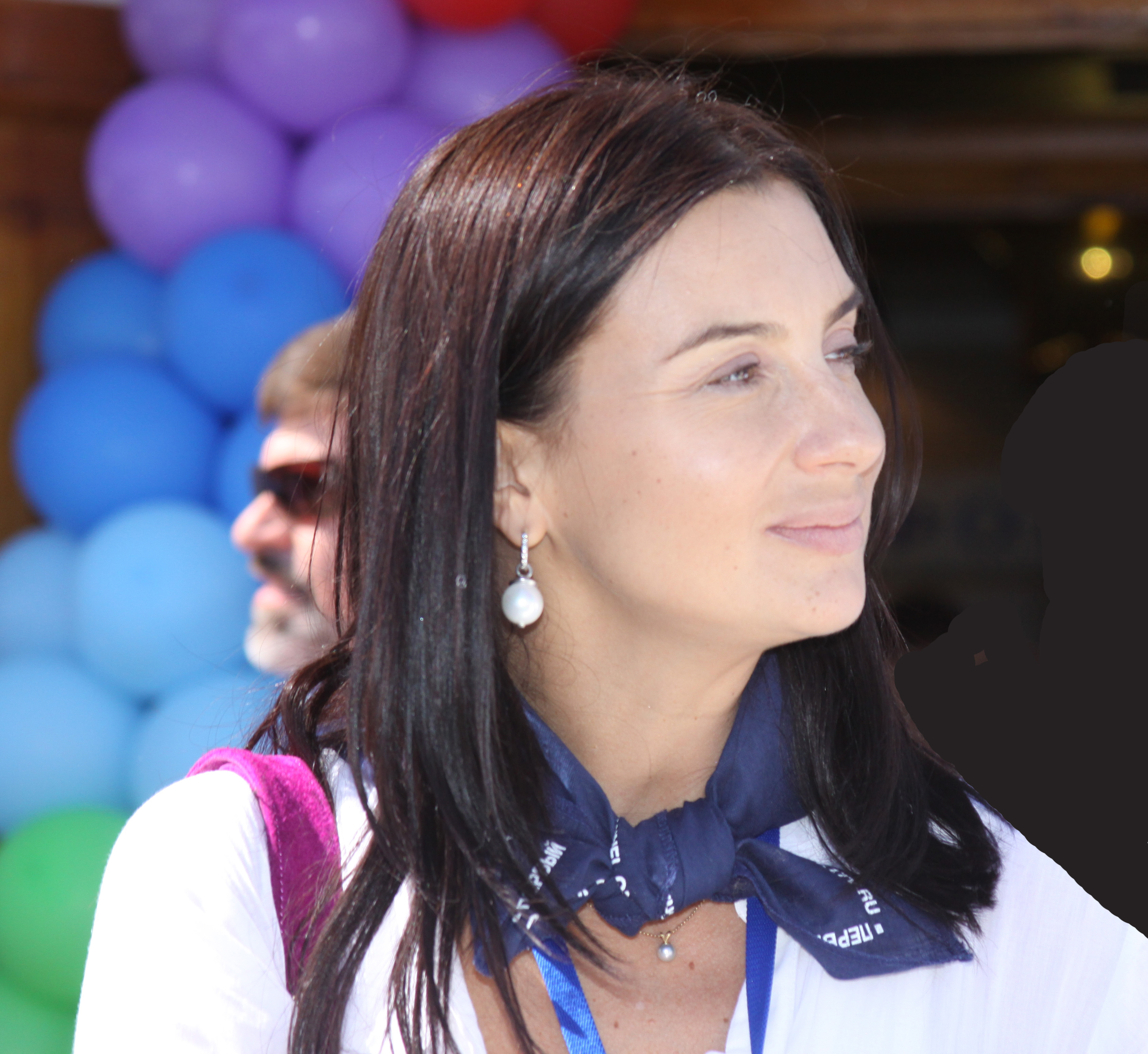
- Yekaterina Strizhenova in 2009
- Born: Yekaterina Tokman; March 20, 1968 (age 58); Moscow, USSR
- Occupations: Actress, tv presenter
- Years active: 1984–present
- Height: 1.68 m (5 ft 6 in)
- Relatives: Oleg Strizhenov (father-in-law)

Yekaterina Strizhenova (Russian: Екатерина Владимировна Стриженова; born Yekaterina Tokman; March 20, 1968) is a Russian film stage actress and television presenter.

Yekaterina was born in Moscow, graduated from Moscow Institute of Culture (now Moscow University of Culture and Arts). She made her film debut in 1984 film drama Leader, where she played the role of a high school student Tanya.

Strizhenova is one of the hosts of television program Good Morning (Russian: Доброе утро, Dobroe Utro) on Channel One. In 2008 she participated in show Ice Age, where celebrities paired with professional figure skaters each week compete by performing ice dancing. She was paired with Alexei Tikhonov. From September 15, 2014 to the present, Ekaterina leads the political talk show Time will Tell on Channel One Russia.

Yekaterina is married to actor and director Alexandr Strizhenov (born 1969, son of actor Oleg Strizhenov), formerly they hosted Good Morning together. The couple has two daughters, Anastasiya (1988) and Alexandra (2000).
