= Seven TV =

Defunct television channel in Russia

Semyorka (7TV)
- Last logo
- Country: Russia
- Broadcast area: Russia; CIS
- Headquarters: 3rd floor, Warsaw Street, Moscow

Programming
- Language: Russian
- Picture format: 576i SDTV

Ownership
- Owner: UTH Russia

History
- Launched: September 17, 2001; 24 years ago
- Closed: December 31, 2011; 14 years ago
- Replaced by: Disney Channel (Russia)

Semyorka, or 7TV (Russian: Семёрка) was a Russian federal television channel, owned by UTH Russia. The channel was launched on 17 September 2001 as a national television channel.

Between 2010/11 season, MegaFon sponsored the channel.

Originally, 7TV broadcast sports. From March to August 2011, it says the channel said that it was under "reconstruction" before being rebranded. The channel used to broadcast a wide variety of TV programs related to entertainment, series and movies. As of March 1, 2011, 7TV rebranded itself as "SevenTV" with their new slogan, "entertained benefit". The headquarters for the channel were located on the 3rd floor of the shopping centre on the Varshavskoye Highway in Moscow. According to TNS, in the third quarter of 2010 the average viewership for the category "18-54 years old", increased to 1.5% compared to the rating of 0.2% in 2009.

Despite those ratings increases, the channel was shut down on December 31, 2011. It was replaced with the Russian version of Disney Channel on same day. The final program aired on the channel was the 1973 film Three Gifts for Cinderella.
