= Arntgolts =

Arntgolts (Russian: Арнтгольц) is a surname. Notable people with the surname include:

- Albert Arntgolts (born 1937), Russian actor, father of below
- Olga Arntgolts (born 1982), Russian actress, twin sister of Tatyana
- Tatyana Arntgolts (born 1982), Russian actress, twin sister of Olga
