= Roizman =

Roizman is a surname. Notable people with the surname include:

- Bernard Roizman (born 1929), American scientist
- Morrie Roizman (1912–1985), American cutter and film maker
- Owen Roizman (1936–2023), American cinematographer
- Yevgeny Roizman (born 1962), Russian politician
- Zinovy Roizman (1941–2022), Russian film and animation director and screenwriter
