= Last Weekend =

Last Weekend or The Last Weekend may refer to:

- Last Weekend (2005 film), a Russian thriller film
- Last Weekend (2014 film), American comedy-drama film
- The Last Weekend, 2010 novel by Blake Morrison
  - The Last Weekend (TV series), 2010 UK miniseries based on the novel
- Pure Mule: The Last Weekend, Irish TV drama
- "The Last Weekend", a 2023 episode of British dark comedy series Inside No. 9
