= Tatyana Arntgolts =

Russian theater and film actress

- Татьяна Арнтгольц
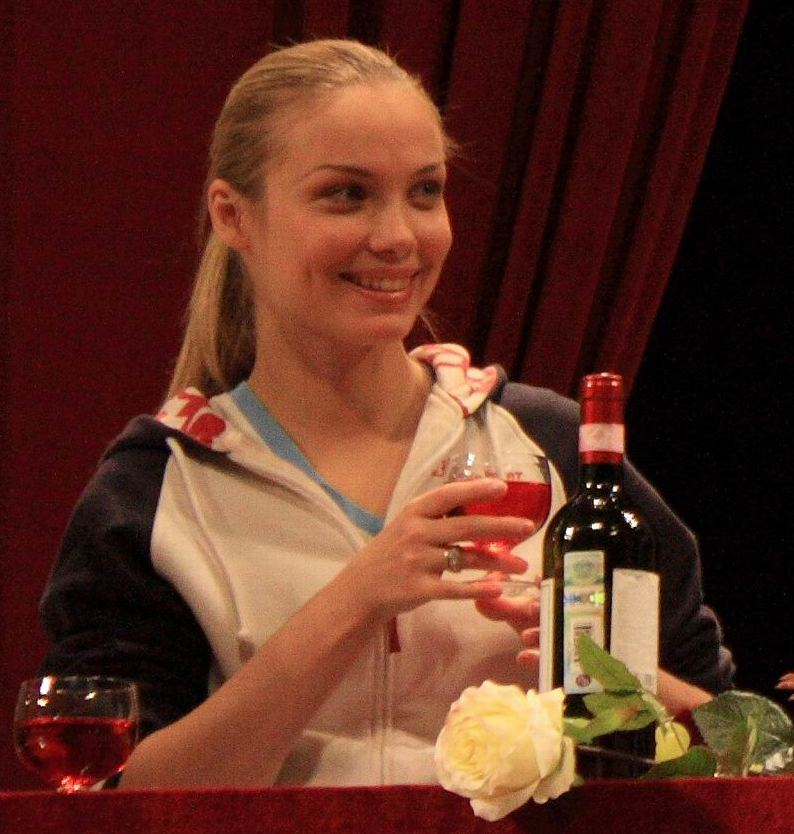
- Tatyana Arntgolts in the play The Old Goat's Tricks on the stage of the Severodvinsk Drama Theater, March 2010
- Born: Tatyana Albertovna Arntgolts; 18 March 1982 (age 43); Kaliningrad, RSFSR, USSR (now Russia)
- Occupations: Actress; TV presenter
- Years active: 1999–present
- Website: Tatyana-Arntgolts.ru

Tatyana Albertovna Arntgolts (Russian: Татьяна Альбертовна Арнтгоольц; born 18 March 1982) is a Russian theater and film actress, and TV presenter. She is well-known for starring in the miniseries Snipers: Love under the Crosshairs.

== Biography ==
Twin sisters Tatyana and Olga were born in Kaliningrad, Russian SFSR, Soviet Union in a family of actors of the Kaliningrad Regional Drama Theater: Honored Artist of the RF Albert Arntgolts and actress Valentina Arntgolts (née Galich). Olga Arntgolts, an identical twin sister, is also an actress. Together they studied at M.S. Schepkin Higher Theatre School in Moscow.

In 2008, Tatyana married actor Ivan Zhidkov. In September 2009, she gave birth to daughter Maria in Moscow. In the summer of 2013 the couple divorced.

== Career ==
In 1999 Arntgolts made her acting debut in the youth drama series Prostiye istiny (The Simple Truth), in which she played student Katya Trofimova.

In 2008 Arntgolts participated in the Channel One show Ice Age, where celebrities paired with professional figure skaters and each week competed by performing ice dancing routines. Her partner was Maxim Staviski.

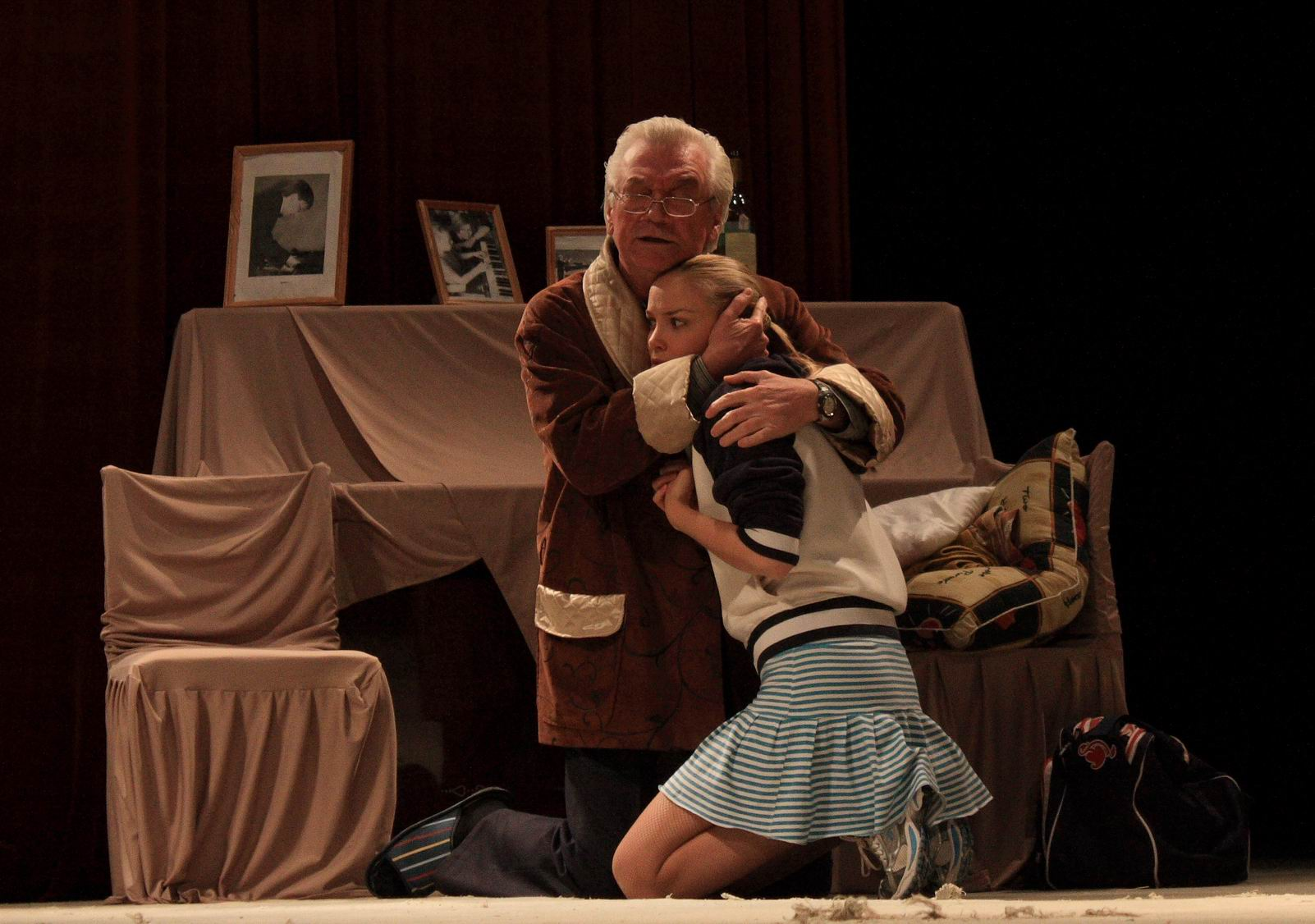
Aristarkh Livanov and Tatyana Arntgolts performed the theater in Severodvinsk, 2010

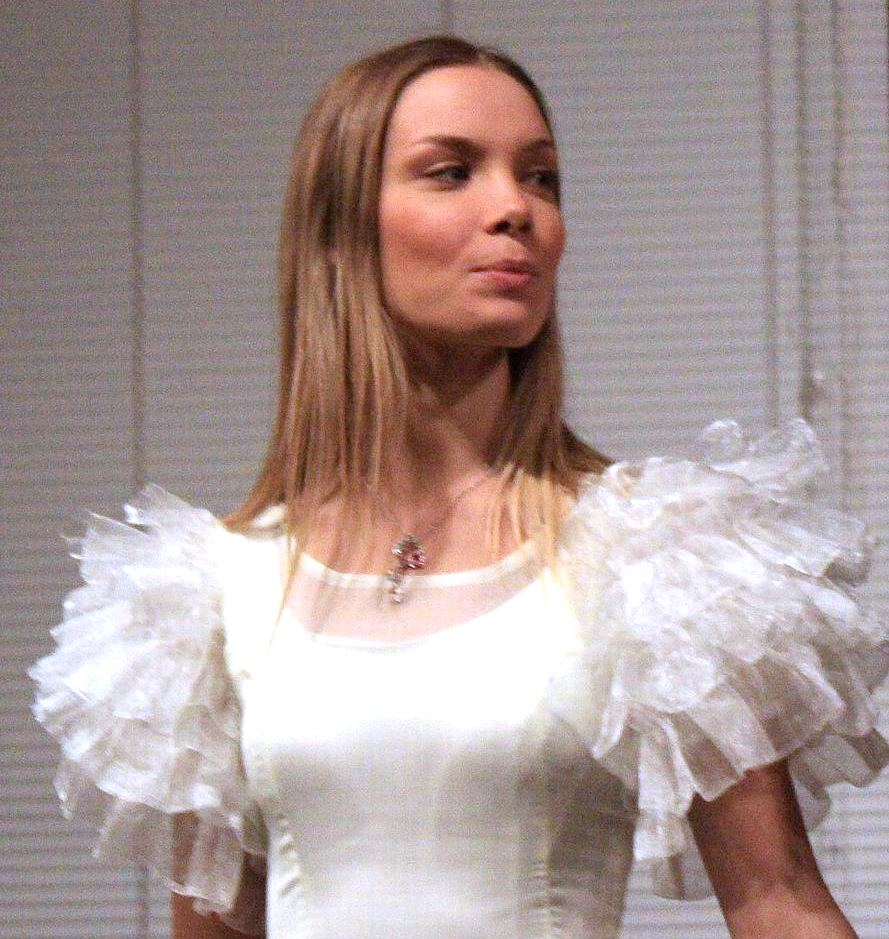
Twin sister of Olga Arntgolts, an actress.

In 2012 Arntgolts starred alongside Wolfgang Cerny in the WWII drama television miniseries Snipers: Love under the Crosshairs which was about snipers who fall in love and are at opposing sides in the war.

== Filmography ==
Year	Title	Role	Notes
1999 -2003	Simple Truths (Простые истины)	student Katya Trofimova	from 57. episode to 350. episode
2001	Next (Следующий)	Nata	2. and 4. episode; season 1
2003	Moscow. Central District (Москва. Центральный округ)	Nijole	12 episodes
2003	Daytime Representative (Дневной представитель)	Yvetta	film
2003	Miracles in Reshetov (Чудеса в Решетове)	rusalka Inka Berendeyeva	film
2003	Why do you need an alibi? (Зачем тебе алиби?)	felon Natasha	4 episodes
2003	The Honeymoon (Медовый месяц)	bride Alya	4 episodes
2003	Cavaliers of the Sea Star (Кавалеры Морской Звезды)	Olga	8 episodes
2004	Moscow. Central District 2 (Москва. Центральный округ 2)	pregnant Nijole	8 episodes
2004	Obsession (Наваждение)	Vera	8 episodes
2004	The New Year Is Cancelled! (Новый год отменяется!)	Katya	film
2005	Last Weekend (Последний уик-энд)	Katya	film
2005	Talisman of Love (Талисман любви)	Liza Kolzova	60 episodes
2005	Diamonds for Juliet (Бриллианты для Джульетты)	Lena	4 episodes
2006	The Madhouse (Дурдом)	nurses Katya Filippova and Svetlana Kulik	12 episodes
2006	Genius Hunt (Охота на гения)	TV reporter Anya Galkina	16 episodes
2006	Under the hail of bullets (Под ливнем пуль); Confrontation (Противостояние) film = 3 + 4 ep.	nurse Vera Sviridova	3 episode of 4
2006	Midlife crisis, or the Fab Four (Бес в ребро, или Великолепная четвёрка)	Catarina	12 episodes
2006	Leningradets (Ленинградец)	Anjuta	3. and 4.; of 4 episodes
2006	Cactus and Elena (Кактус и Елена)	Elena	film
2006	And yet I Love... (И всё-таки я люблю…)	Vera	first 19 of 24 episodes
2007	Gloss	Oksana	film
2007	Stronger than Fire (Сильнее огня) or Two and the War (Двое и Война)	teacher and diversant radist Marina Samoylova	4 episodes
2008	That night the angels cried (Этим вечером ангелы плакали)	Tanya	film
2008	Testament's wedding (Брак по завещанию)	Alexandra Kozintseva alias Sandra Seymour	12 episodes
2008	Daughter (Дочка)	prostitute Lera Ivanova	film
2009	Cuties (Лапушки)	stripper Natasha	8 episodes
since 2009	Heart of the Enemy (Сердце врага)	German pilot's wife Elsa Vesling	not allowed
2010	Grass under the snow (Трава под снегом)	Lesya	4 episodes
2011	Furtseva. Legend of Catherine (Фурцева. Легенда о Екатерине)	Catherine Furceva politician in her youth	first 5 of 12 episodes
2011	Testament's wedding. Returning Sandra (Брак по завещанию. Возвращение Сандры)	Alexandra Kozintseva alias Sandra Seymour	8 episodes
2011	Pure gold (Чистая проба)	pedologyst Julia	8 episodes
2012	Swallow's Nest (Ласточкино гнездо)	Ida	12 episodes
2012	Victoria (Виктория)	Victoria	8 episodes
2012	Snipers: Love under the Crosshairs (Снайперы: Любовь под прицелом)	sniper Catherine Rodionova	8 episodes
2013	Second revolt of Spartacus (Второе восстание Спартака)	Polish resistance fighter Beata	10 episodes
2013	Night Swallows (Ночные ласточки)	pilot Eugenia Zvonaryova	8 episodes
2013	Testament's wedding. Firewalking (Брак по завещанию. Танцы на углях)	Alexandra Kozintseva alias Sandra Seymour	9 episodes
2014	The Champions (Чемпионы)	figure skater Elena Berezhnaya	film
2014	Photographer (Fotograf)	policewoman Natasha	film
2014	Temptation / Repentance (Соблазн / Раскаяние)	Vera Matveyeva	16 episodes
2015	Cult (Культ)	Nadezda Ljubavina	12 episodes
2015	The past can wait (Прошлое умеет ждать)	Polina Kirsanova	4 episodes
2015	Argentina (Аргентина)	Olga Metelska	4 episodes
2016	25th Hour (25-й час)	journalist Anna Gromova	12 episodes
2017	Provocateur (Провокатор)	Alina	20 episodes
2017	The Monk (Монах)	Catarina	film 19 min.
2017	The lure of an angel (Наживка для ангела)	Dasa Panteleyeva	16 episodes
2017	Double life (Двойная жизнь)	Nadezda Stroyeva	episodes 3 - 8
2018	New person (Новый человек)	Irina	17 episodes
2019	Death in the Language of Flowers (Смерть на языке цветов)	Lilya	4 episodes

== Theater ==
- Fairy-Tales Of Old Arbat — as Viktosha — based on the play of the same name written by Alexey Arbuzov, directed by Olga Shvedova
- Tricks of the old goat — as Sasha — written by Vitaliy Krym, directed by Olga Shvedova
- Let sleeping dogs lie — as Betty Whitehouse — based on J. B. Priestley's play Dangerous Corner, directed by Olga Shvedova
- Five Evenings — as Katya — written by Alexander Volodin, directed by Olga Anochina
- Two for the Seesaw — as Gitel Mosca — based on the play of the same name written by Villiam Gibson, directed by Alexey Kiryushenko
- The Crossroads Of Love — as Shura — based on the play Faryatev's Fantasies written by Alla Sokolova, directed by Rodion Obchinnikov
