= Bigga than Ben =

2008 comedy film

- Film poster
- Directed by: Suzie Halewood
- Written by: Suzie Halewood
- Based on: Bigga Than Ben: The Russians' Guide to Ripping Off London by Sergei Sakin and Pavel Tetersky
- Produced by: Suzie Halewood; Liz Holford; Melissa Simmonds
- Starring: Ben Barnes; Andrei Chadov; Ovidiu Matesan; Hero Fiennes Tiffin
- Cinematography: Ben Moulden
- Music by: Paul E Francis
- Production company: Gas Station 8
- Distributed by: Tiny Hand Films
- Release dates: 31 May 2008 (Brooklyn International Film Festival); 10 October 2008 (United Kingdom)
- Running time: 85 minutes
- Country: United Kingdom
- Language: English
- Budget: $250,000
- Box office: $750,000

Bigga than Ben is a 2008 British black comedy film written and directed by Suzie Halewood. The film is based on the 1999 Russian novel of the same name.

It was released on 10 October 2008 in the United Kingdom and 18 November 2008 in the United States. It stars Ben Barnes, Andrei Chadov, Ovidiu Matesan and Hero Fiennes Tiffin.

== Plot ==
This dark comedy from the UK, is a tale of two selfish, wayward young Russian backpackers who come to London in an attempt to amass an easy fortune.

But it's not too long before Spiker and Cobakka realize that legally, they aren't going to get very far. So, aided by the dodgy Artash they learn to shoplift from supermarkets, rip off banks, joyride on the London Underground and turn mobile phones into crack cocaine.

== Cast ==
- Ben Barnes as Cobakka
- Andrei Chadov as Spiker
- Ovidiu Matesan as Artash
- Hero Fiennes Tiffin as Spartak

== Critical reception ==
Bigga than Ben received generally favourable reviews from critics. The review aggregator Rotten Tomatoes reported that 60% of critics gave the film positive reviews. The film was nominated for Best Narrative Film at Austin Film Festival, played Best of the Fest at Edinburgh, Won Best Comedy Film at Los Angeles DIY FF and made The Times Top 100 Films of that year.

Cosmo Landesman in The Sunday Times gave the film four stars and said the film was "Dark, funny, charming, fast, immoral, decadent and delightful. The best double act buddies since Butch Cassidy & the Sundance Kid."

London's Time Out said, "Makes Dirty Pretty Things look like a government advisory documentary... street-smart, non-PC and very funny" and also gave the film four stars.
