= Miraz =

Fictional character in The Chronicles of Narnia

King Miraz
- Narnia character
- Sergio Castellitto as King Miraz in The Chronicles of Narnia: Prince Caspian

In-universe information
- Race: Human
- Title: Miraz the Usurper, King of Narnia, Emperor of the Lone Islands, Lord of Telmar
- Family: Caspian IX See relations of Caspian.
- Spouse: Prunaprismia
- Children: Unnamed son
- Nationality: Narnia

Miraz is a fictional character from C. S. Lewis's fantasy series The Chronicles of Narnia. He is the main antagonist in the book Prince Caspian, and is the uncle of the book's protagonist.

Miraz killed his brother, Caspian IX, allowing his nephew to live as heir until, as the book opens, his wife bears him a legitimate heir. He is a descendant of the Telmarines who had invaded Narnia hundreds of years before, and a cruel and unpopular ruler. Most notorious for banning the teaching of Narnia's pre-Telmarine history, he also levies high taxes and enacts harsh laws. He is ultimately defeated in a duel by Peter Pevensie and then slain by his own advisors.

== Character ==
Miraz is a tyrant. Eliana Ionoaia notes that "this type of kingship can be termed a tyranny since Miraz rules through oppression, cruelty, and fear." Matthew Dickerson and David O'Hara argue that:

Miraz seeks to remove all sense of enchantment from nature – swords and battles are what are real for Miraz, not talking animals and trees – and by removing enchantment he seeks also to remove all sense of nature's sanctity. For in disenchanting and desanctifying the earth and its creatures, he will be more justified in exploiting it.

== Significance ==
The relationship between Miraz and his nephew, Prince Caspian, resembles that of Claudius and Hamlet in Shakespeare's play Hamlet, as well as Pelias and Jason from Greek mythology.

In a Christianity Today opinion piece published in 2008, Devin Brown noted that Miraz was "aloof and emotionally distant" like Lewis's own father. This theme is explored in more detail in Chandler Hanton's dissertation, The Tragedy of Caspian: C. S. Lewis and His Trauma.

== Adaptations ==
Robert Lang as Miraz in the BBC serial

In the 1989 BBC adaptation, Miraz is played by Robert Lang.

In the 2008 cinematic adaptation, Miraz is portrayed by Sergio Castellitto, an accomplished Italian actor hypothesized by IGN as chosen "to give the Telmarines a Latin-Mediterranean ethnic flavor." The New York Times' review noted that the film's "major source of dramatic energy is the villain, Caspian’s uncle Miraz, who is played with malignant grandeur" by Castellitto. While panning the movie as a whole, movie critic Mick LaSalle found Miraz "square-shouldered and decisive and, by medieval king standards, probably not all that bad. His beard may be too pointy for virtue, but he's hardly evil enough to make it worth yanking the Pevensie siblings out of 1940s England." In an extended critique of the movie, Steven D. Boyer complains that the rivalry between Caspian and Peter is nowhere in the books, but is rather itself a reflection of Miraz's original character.

Regnal titles
Preceded by Caspian IX	King of Narnia; 2290–2303	Succeeded by Caspian X
