= Killing Bono =

2011 film by Nick Hamm

- Theatrical release poster
- Directed by: Nick Hamm
- Screenplay by: Dick Clement; Ian La Frenais; Simon Maxwell; Ben Bond
- Based on: Killing Bono: I Was Bono's Doppelgänger by Neil McCormick
- Produced by: Ian Flooks; Nick Hamm; Mark Huffam; Piers Tempest
- Starring: Ben Barnes; Robert Sheehan; Krysten Ritter; Peter Serafinowicz; Stanley Townsend; Justine Waddell; Martin McCann; Pete Postlethwaite
- Cinematography: Kieran McGuigan
- Edited by: Billy Sneddon
- Production companies: Greenroom Entertainment; Wasted Talent; The Salt Company; Generator Entertainment
- Distributed by: Paramount Pictures
- Release date: 1 April 2011
- Running time: 114 minutes
- Countries: United Kingdom; Ireland
- Language: English

Killing Bono is a 2011 comedy film directed by Nick Hamm, based on Neil McCormick's memoir Killing Bono: I Was Bono's Doppelgänger (2003).

The film stars Ben Barnes as Neil McCormick, Robert Sheehan as Ivan McCormick and Martin McCann as Irish singer Bono. It marked the final film role of Pete Postlethwaite, who died three months before its release.

== Plot ==
The film loosely recreates the story of young Irish rocker McCormick and his younger brother, Ivan, who attempt to become rock stars but can only look on as their secondary school friends form one of the biggest bands in the world, U2.

== Cast ==
- Ben Barnes as Neil
- Robert Sheehan as Ivan
- Martin McCann as Bono
- Stanley Townsend as Danny
- Pete Postlethwaite as Karl
- Krysten Ritter as Gloria
- Peter Serafinowicz as Hammond
- Hugh O'Conor as Gary
- Aidan McArdle as Bill
- Luke Treadaway as Nick
- Justine Waddell as Danielle
- Ralph Brown as Leo

== Production ==
The film was shot in Northern Ireland, was funded by Northern Ireland Screen and was released by Paramount Pictures (the distributor of U2's film Rattle and Hum) in the United Kingdom and Ireland on 1 April 2011. Sony Music Entertainment released the film's soundtrack worldwide. The European premiere was held in the Savoy Cinema in Dublin.

== Reception ==
On Rotten Tomatoes, the film holds an approval rating of 56% based on 43 reviews, with an average rating of 5.4/10. Metacritic assigned the film a weighted average score of 46 out of 100, based on 12 critics, indicating "mixed or average reviews".

Jeannette Catsoulis of The New York Times called the film "shapeless", and added that "like its deluded antihero, just doesn't know when to stop".

Noel Murray of The A.V. Club wrote "There's a difference between "funny" and "comedy", and the movie adaptation of Killing Bono tries way too hard to be nutty, at the expense of just getting across what McCormick knows."

According to Jesse Cataldo of Slant Magazine "[the film] never really gets going, mostly because it has no real idea of how to convey joy, pain, or any type of emotional progression".

Joshua Rothkopf of Time Out was more positive of Killing Bono. His reaction was: "Amadeus it's not, but as light transitional music, the film-which has Pete Postlethwaite's final performance, as a swishy landlord-is tuneful enough".

Jordan Mintzer of The Hollywood Reporter was also positive about the film, writing "This cleverly conceived, behind-the-scenes tale features fine lead performances and enough nods to the epic group's early days to interest fans outside the U.K."
