= Andrei Chadov =

Russian actor (born 1980)

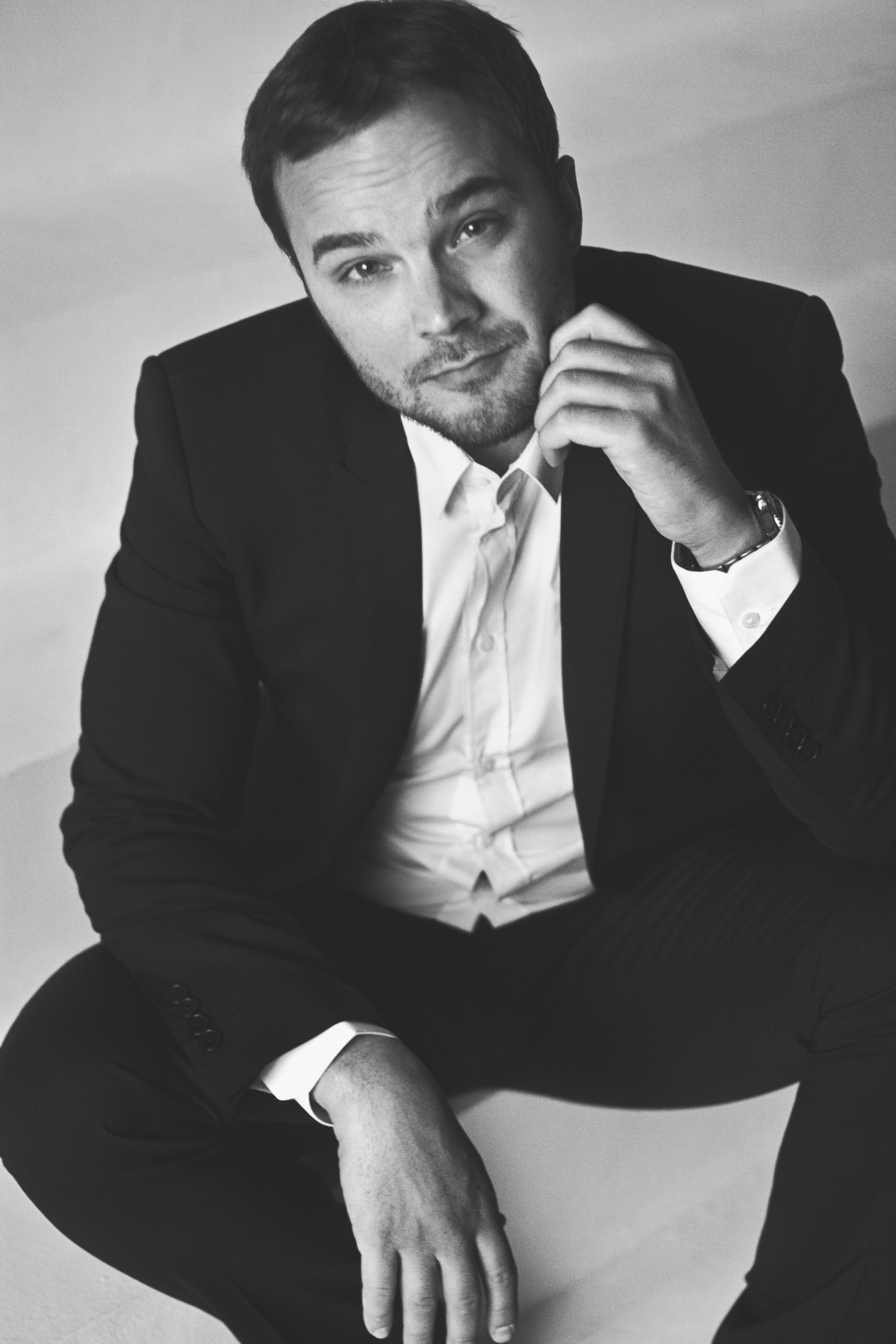
- Born: Andrei Aleksandrovich Chadov; 22 May 1980 (age 45); Solntsevo, Moscow Oblast, Russian SFSR, Soviet Union (now Moscow, Russia)
- Education: Mikhail Shchepkin Higher Theatre School
- Occupations: Actor; television actor
- Years active: 2001–present

Andrei Aleksandrovich Chadov (Russian: Андрей Александрович Чадов; born 22 May 1980) is a Russian theater and film actor, producer.

== Early life ==
Chadov was born on born 22 May 1980 in the city of Solntsevo, Moscow Oblast, Russian SFSR, Soviet Union (in May 1984, the city of Solntsevo became part of Moscow, Russia). He has a younger brother, Aleksey, who is also an actor. His father, Aleksandr Chadov, died in 1986, leaving the brothers to be raised by their mother. Chadov began acting at school, then continued as amateur actors at the municipal theatre-studio in Peredelkino, Moscow Oblast. After graduating from school, Chadov enrolled at the Shchukin Acting School, then transferred to join his brother at Shchepkin Theatrical School in Moscow.

== Career ==
While a student, Chadov made his film debut in a supporting role in Avalanche (2001) by director Ivan Solovov.

Andrei became famous after starring in television series The Cadets, where he played one of the main characters: the young Peter Todorovskiy.

In 2004 he starred in the drama Russians. For this role, Andrei received the prize at the festival "Moscow Premiere" in the category Best Actor.

In 2006, Chadvo appeared alongside his brother in the film Alive. They have also appeared together in various other films and television series, such as SLOVE. Soldiers of Love, and the television show A Matter of Honor.

Chadov has also been involved in Western film productions, such as the 2008 British film Bigga than Ben.

== Personal life ==
During filming of the television show Big Race Chadov met Svetlana Svetikova, who became his girlfriend, although they broke up in the spring of 2010.

== Filmography ==
Year	Title	Role	Notes
2001	Avalanche		
2004	The Cadets (Курсанты)	Pyotr Gluschenko	Television series
2004	It's Russian (Русское)	Edik Savenko	
2006	Alive (Живой)	Kir	Television film
2007	Young Wolfhound	Kattai	Television series
2007	Enemy's Heart	Erich Hartmann	
2008	Bigga than Ben	Spiker	British film
2008	Limousine	F.	Polish film
2009	The Alpinist (Альпинист)	Max Pavlov	
2011	SLOVE. Soldiers of Love (SLOVE: Прямо в сердце)	Ronin	Russo-German film
2011	A Quiet Outpost (Тихая Застава)	Pankov	
2014	Provocator	Anton	
2014	A Matter of Honor	Alexandre	Television series
