= It's Russian =

- Russian: Русское
- Directed by: Alexander Veledinsky
- Written by: Eduard Limonov; Aleksandr Veledinskiy
- Produced by: Aleksei Alyakin; Sergey Chliyants; Maksim Lagashkin
- Starring: Andrey Chadov; Olga Arntgolts; Evdokiya Germanova; Mikhail Efremov; Vladimir Steklov
- Cinematography: Pavel Ignatov
- Edited by: Tatyana Prilenskaya
- Music by: Aleksey Zubarev
- Release date: 2004
- Country: Russia
- Language: Russian

It's Russian (Russian: Русское) is a 2004 Russian crime comedy-drama film directed by Aleksandr Veledinsky.

== Plot ==
In 1959 Kharkov, young poet Eduard "Ed" Savenko is trying to get attention from the girl he fell in love with, Svetka, who tells him that he's "too poor for her". He attempts to find some money to take her to a restaurant, unsuccessfully asking his mother for it, trying to sell a trophy razor from the Nazi Germany, and eventually he ends up robbing a store; yet, in the end, Svetka goes out with a local thief.

In despair, Ed gets drunk and gives Svetka a visit, reading her a poem he wrote, while holding a knife behind his back; however, he doesn't harm her and instead cuts his wrist, what puts him in the Saburova Dacha psychiatric hospital, colloquially known as "Saburka". Due to the children's ward being full, he gets put in a ward with adult patients, which include Uncle Sasha, who pretends he participated in the October Revolution; "Magellan", a diagnosed psychopath; Mikhaylov, who is an expert in literature and often chips off tiles in the bathrooms; and Avaz, who is addicted to masturbation.

Ed and "Magellan" escape not long before the New Year, with Ed having sex with Svetka. Ed visits a church, begging God to make his life interesting, and they are caught by police the next day, thanks to a clue from his mother. She is later told by Ed to tell the local hooligans that he is getting "killed" in the hospital, and they end up rioting in front of the hospital.

Professor Arkhipov from Moscow arrives soon though, and he discharges Ed, since he recognizes his "suicide attempt" as simply an action to get attention from the world.

== Cast ==
- Andrey Chadov as Ed
- Olga Arntgolts as Svetka
- Evdokiya Germanova as Mother
- Mikhail Efremov as Father
- Vladimir Steklov as Zilberman
- Aleksey Gorbunov as Gorkun
- Dmitry Dyuzhev as Slavka
- Anatoliy Zalyubovsky as Kadik
- Oleg Lopukhov as Sanya
- Viktor Rakov as Mikhaylov
