= Olga Arntgolts =

Russian theater and film actress

- Ольга Арнтгольц
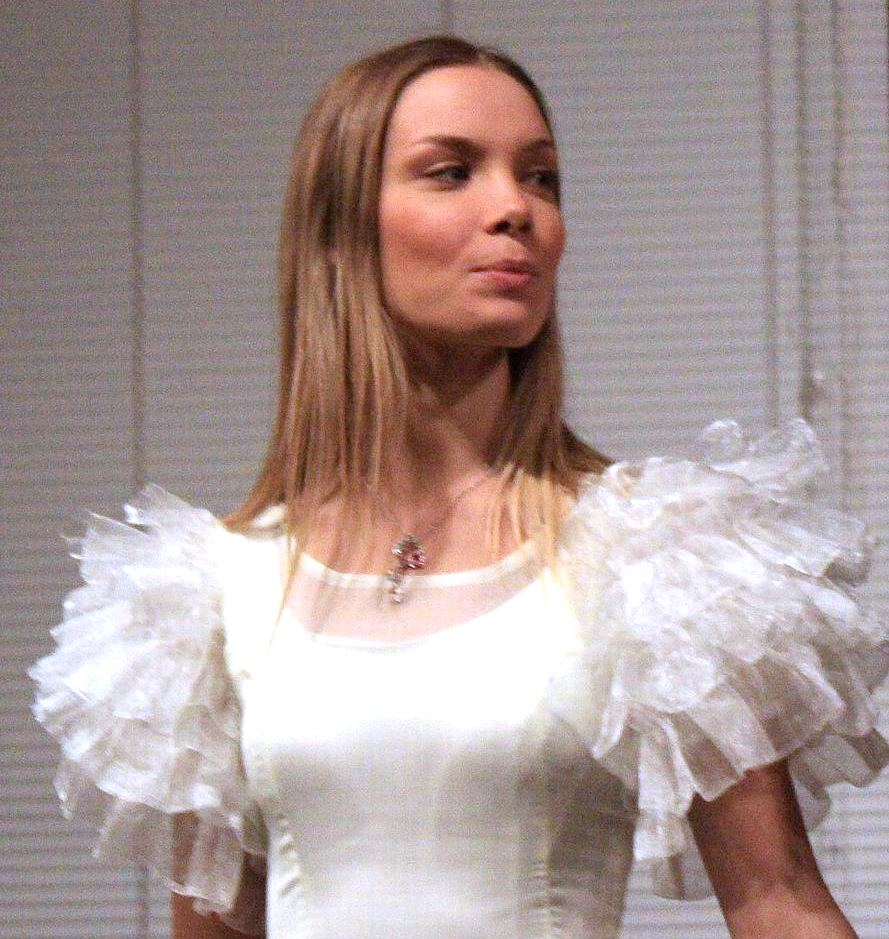
- Olga Arntgolts in the play Don't Wake the Sleeping Dog on the stage of the Severodvinsk Drama Theater, 24 February 2010
- Born: Olga Albertovna Arntgolts; 18 March 1982 (age 44); Kaliningrad, RSFSR, USSR (now Russia)
- Occupation: Actress
- Years active: 1999–present

Olga Albertovna Arntgolts (Russian: Ольга Альбертовна Арнтгоольц; born 18 March 1982) is a Russian theater and film actress.

== Biography ==
Twin sisters Tatyana and Olga were born in Kaliningrad, Russian SFSR, Soviet Union in a family of actors of the Kaliningrad Regional Drama Theater: Honored Artist of the RF Albert Arntgolts and actress Valentina Arntgolts (née Galich). Tatyana Arntgolts, who was born 20 minutes before Olga, is also an actress. Together they studied at M.S. Schepkin Higher Theatre School in Moscow.

In 2009, Arntgolts participated in the Channel One television ice show Ice Age: Global Warming. Superfinal together with figure skater Maxim Staviski, where she replaced her sister Tatyana, who had to stop participating in the project due to pregnancy.

== Filmography ==
- It's Russian (2004)
- Samara (2011)

== Personal life ==
In summer 2009, Arntgolts married actor Vakhtang Beridze. On 1 October 2013, their daughter Anna was born. In September 2015, Arntgolts filed for divorce.

In 2016, it became known that Arntgolts was pregnant for the second time with director Dmitry Petrun, with whom she began a relationship on the set of the television series Officers' Wives (2015); at that time the actress was still married. On 21 December 2016, she gave birth to their first son, Akim. On 28 January 2021, she gave birth to their second son, Leo.
