= Jackie & Ryan =

- Theatrical release poster
- Directed by: Ami Canaan Mann
- Written by: Ami Canaan Mann
- Produced by: Ami Canaan Mann; Jon Avnet; Rodrigo García
- Starring: Katherine Heigl; Ben Barnes; Clea DuVall; Sheryl Lee; Emily Alyn Lind; Ryan Bingham
- Cinematography: Duane Manwiller
- Edited by: Mako Kamitsuna; Lauren Connelly
- Music by: Nick Hans
- Production companies: Highland Film Group; 120dB Films; Main Street Films
- Distributed by: Entertainment One
- Release dates: August 30, 2014 (Venice); July 3, 2015 (United States)
- Running time: 90 minutes
- Country: United States
- Language: English
- Box office: $19,305

Jackie & Ryan (released in the UK and South Africa as Love Me Like You Do) is a 2014 American romantic drama film written and directed by Ami Canaan Mann, starring Katherine Heigl and Ben Barnes.

Set in Utah, two 20-something musicians' paths briefly intersect, the nomadic Ryan, a modern-day train hopper struggling to be a successful bluegrass musician, and the recent, single mom Jackie, who is battling to get custody of her daughter. They share a connection which briefly becomes passionate and changes both of their lives.

The film was released on July 3, 2015 in a limited release and through video on demand by Entertainment One in the United States.

== Plot ==
Nomadic musician Ryan ends up in remote Ogden, Utah, hoping to visit his friend and fellow musician and nomad, Cowboy. Meeting with Cowboy's brother, they busk in town, where he briefly meets Jackie Laurel, who recognizes their talent. Noticing they only do cover songs, she questions why they do not have their own message.

Ryan goes to Virginia's mom's looking for Cowboy, but discovers his friend left his partner and infant son Henry for the open road. Virginia explains that he was unhappy with a sedentary life, so he was angry all the time. Cowboy is also a modern-day, nomadic train hopper like Ryan.

As Ryan is in town, he sees a pickup knock down Jackie. Rushing to her aid, he leaves his guitar and backpack leaning against a wall. Unfortunately, his bag is stolen when his back is turned. The truck driver leaves them at Jackie's mom Miriam's. There, Jackie reveals she is also a musician who was once known.

Ryan, who is struggling to be a successful bluegrass musician, agrees to stay for dinner. Miriam is distrustful of the nomad, and Jackie's daughter Lia is curious. Ryan tells them he has been on the move since he was 14, and he describes different jobs he has had along the way. Miriam makes it clear she is anxious to see him go.

Jackie now lives on little money in her mother’s home in her hometown, and regularly has nasty phone altercations about Lia with her almost ex-husband, Wes, battling over their daughter's custody. Against Miriam's wishes, she offers Ryan a cot to sleep on.

In the morning, noticing a leak on the porch roof, Ryan points out that the roof could suffer severe damage if it is not repaired before winter sets in. Through his charm and handyman skills, Ryan stays a few days with Jackie at her mother’s. In a short time, they find inspiration in each other. In their deepening relationship, Jackie pushes Ryan to write his own songs, while he motivates her to stand up to her husband, who resists mediation with her.

Lia gets Ryan to go with the family to the local folk music festival, where locals freely perform for one another. When Jackie is inevitably coaxed back on stage for the first time in a long time, she first delivers an impassioned monologue about the choices people make when they do not feel they have a lot of options. Then Jackie gets Lia to sing the traditional folk song Down on Penny’s Farm.

Overwhelmed afterwards, Jackie rushes outside, and Ryan soon follows. She pours out all of her concerns, explaining her ex is trying to force them to move back to NYC and drop the divorce case or fight for Lia's full custody. Ryan assures her she will keep her daughter and they share a kiss.

Jackie sells all of her valuable jewelry and approaches Matt, a local lawyer she grew up with, to get him on retainer for divorce proceedings. Discovering she is very short, she finally decides to sell her NYC condo after Lia accepts the proposal to stay in Utah. The news that Cowboy, or Scott, has met his demise is finally Ryan's impetus to head on to meet Georgie in Portland, Oregon, at the recording studio to record some of his original songs.

So, Jackie and Ryan part ways to follow their quests. Jackie heads to NYC to sell her condo and briefly faces her ex, Wes. Ryan finally gets to the recording studio and records some of his original songs.

In a final shot, Ryan shows up at Jackie's, and they embrace.

== Cast ==
- Katherine Heigl as Jackie
- Ben Barnes as Ryan
- Clea DuVall as Virginia
- Sheryl Lee as Miriam
- Emily Alyn Lind as Lia
- Ryan Bingham as Cowboy's Brother

== Production ==
Filming took place in Utah in 2014. The film was shot in 20 days.

== Release ==
Jackie & Ryan screened in the Horizons section at the 71st Venice International Film Festival on August 30, 2014. The film then screened at the Newport Beach International Film Festival on April 25, 2015. The film's distribution rights were later acquired by Entertainment One, and was released in the United States on July 3, 2015 in a limited release and through video on demand.

== Reception ==
Jackie & Ryan received mixed reviews. On review aggregator Rotten Tomatoes, critics gave the film a rating of 64%, based on 22 reviews, with a weighted average of 5.42/10. On Metacritic, the film has a score of 55%, based on 15 reviews. Jessica Kiang of Indiewire gave the film a "C" rating, calling it "a strangely old-fashioned film, yielding a big enough crop of corn to revive the entire Midwestern economy, putting forth a dubiously romanticized view of the philosophical beauty of the train-hopping lifestyle". Lee Marshall of Screen International in his favorable review commented that it is "a women's film in which the sensitively-conveyed bond between three female generations of one family seem destined to be much stronger than any ties with the men who drift in and out of sight".
