= Albert Arntgolts =

Russian stage actor (born 1937)

- Born: Albert Alfonsovich Arntgolts; 24 February 1937 (age 89); Leningrad, Russian SFSR, Soviet Union
- Occupation: Actor
- Years active: 1958–present
- Spouse: Valentina Galich
- Children: 3, including Tatyana and Olga

Albert Alfonsovich Arntgolts (Russian: Альберт Альфонсович Арнтгольц; born 24 February 1937) is a Soviet and Russian stage actor. He is a recipient of the Merited Artist of the Russian Federation (1993).

== Biography ==
Arntgolts was born on 24 February 1937 in Leningrad. In 1958, he graduated from the Leningrad Military Institute of Physical Culture and Sports. From 1962 to 1971, he worked in the troupe of the Chita Regional Drama Theater. He also worked at the Azerbaijan State Academic Russian Drama Theatre in Baku and the State Russian Drama Theater in Izhevsk. Since 1971, he has been a part of the Kaliningrad Regional Drama Theater. He has been the leading performer of the theater.

== Personal life ==
Arntgolts is the patriarch of the Arntgolts acting family. He is married to Valentina Galich who is also a stage actress. They have three children: Anton, Tatyana, and Olga.
