= The Chronicles of Narnia: Prince Caspian =

2008 film directed by Andrew Adamson

- Theatrical release poster
- Directed by: Andrew Adamson
- Screenplay by: Andrew Adamson; Christopher Markus Stephen McFeely
- Based on: Prince Caspian by C. S. Lewis
- Produced by: Mark Johnson; Andrew Adamson; Philip Steuer
- Starring: Ben Barnes; Georgie Henley; Skandar Keynes; William Moseley; Anna Popplewell
- Cinematography: Karl Walter Lindenlaub
- Edited by: Sim Evan-Jones
- Music by: Harry Gregson-Williams
- Production companies: Walt Disney Pictures; Walden Media
- Distributed by: Walt Disney Studios Motion Pictures
- Release dates: May 7, 2008 (New York City); May 16, 2008 (United States); June 26, 2008 (United Kingdom)
- Running time: 150 minutes
- Countries: United Kingdom; United States
- Language: English
- Budget: $225 million
- Box office: $419.6 million

The Chronicles of Narnia: Prince Caspian is a 2008 high fantasy film, directed by Andrew Adamson, and written by Adamson, Christopher Markus and Stephen McFeely. It is based on the 1951 novel Prince Caspian, the second published and fourth chronological novel in the children's book series The Chronicles of Narnia by C. S. Lewis. The sequel to The Chronicles of Narnia: the Lion, the Witch and the Wardrobe (2005), it is the second installment in The Chronicles of Narnia film series by Walden Media. Georgie Henley, Skandar Keynes, William Moseley and Anna Popplewell reprise their roles from the previous film. The plot involves the four Pevensie siblings returning to Narnia to aid Prince Caspian in his struggle for the throne against his corrupt uncle, King Miraz.

Work on the script began before the first film, The Lion, the Witch and the Wardrobe, was released, so that filming could begin before the actors grew too old for their parts. Director Andrew Adamson wanted to make the film more spectacular than the first. The Narnians were designed to look wilder as they have been hiding from persecution, stressing the darker tone of the sequel. The filmmakers also took a Spanish influence for the antagonistic race of the Telmarines. Filming began in February 2007 in New Zealand, but unlike the previous film, the majority of shooting took place in Central Europe, because of the larger sets available in those countries. To keep costs down, Adamson chose to base post-production in the United Kingdom, because of recent tax credits there. It was produced by Walt Disney Pictures and Walden Media.

The Chronicles of Narnia: Prince Caspian premiered on May 7, 2008, at the Ziegfeld Theatre in New York City, and was released on May 16 in the United States and on June 26 in the United Kingdom, by Walt Disney Pictures. The film received generally positive reviews from critics, with praise for the special effects, storytelling and faithfulness to the source material, though some criticized its runtime and underlying messages. It grossed $419.6 million on a budget of $225 million, becoming the tenth-highest-grossing film of 2008.

== Plot ==
In Narnia, almost 1,300 years after the Pevensie siblings (King Peter, Queen Susan, King Edmund, and Queen Lucy) left Narnia and returned to their world, Caspian, a Telmarine prince, is awakened by his mentor, Doctor Cornelius. Doctor Cornelius informs Caspian that his aunt has just given birth to a son and that his life is now in grave danger. Cornelius gives him Queen Susan's ancient magical horn and instructs him to use it if he is in dire need. Knowing that his Uncle Miraz would kill him to be king, Caspian flees. Chased by several Telmarine soldiers, Caspian falls from his horse and encounters two Narnian dwarfs and a talking badger in the woods. One of the dwarfs, Trumpkin, is captured by the soldiers after sacrificing himself to save Caspian. The other dwarf, Nikabrik, and the badger, Trufflehunter, save Caspian. Not knowing they are trying to save him, Caspian blows the magical horn, trying to summon help.

In England, after one year has passed in their world since they left Narnia, the four Pevensie children wait at the Strand tube station for their train, which will take them to boarding school. Just as the train pulls into the station, the station tears apart, and they are transported back to Narnia. There, they discover their castle, Cair Paravel, was attacked and ruined in their absence. The Pevensies save a bound and gagged Trumpkin, who is about to be drowned, and they set out together. Lucy sees Aslan trying to show them a safe path but finds her siblings unable to see him. She later manages to contact Aslan in a dream, but only Edmund believes her.

Meanwhile, Nikabrik and Trufflehunter lead Caspian to the Dancing Lawn, where all the old Narnians have assembled. Caspian convinces them to help him win his throne. Caspian and his troops encounter the Pevensies and Trumpkin, and they journey together to Aslan's How, a huge underground hall built over the Stone Table. Lucy wants to wait for Aslan, but Peter decides they have waited long enough and suggests attacking Miraz's castle. Caspian and the Pevensies infiltrate the castle at night with the intent of opening the gates for the Narnian army, but Caspian, learning that Miraz is responsible for his father's death, confronts his uncle and compromises the attack. The attack fails because of Caspian's actions and many Narnians are killed due to Peter's recklessness.

Nikabrik and a werewolf tell Caspian that there is a way he can claim revenge. When Caspian agrees, a hag uses black sorcery to summon the White Witch. From inside a wall of ice, the spirit of the Witch tries to convince Caspian to give her a drop of his blood to resurrect her. The Pevensies and Trumpkin intervene, killing the rogues before they can force Caspian to complete the ritual, but the spirit then tempts Peter to do the same. Edmund shatters the wall of ice before the Witch can be resurrected.

Seeking redemption for his failure at Miraz's castle, Peter challenges Miraz to a one-on-one duel to buy Lucy time to find Aslan. Peter wounds Miraz and gives his sword to Caspian to finish him off. Caspian spares Miraz's life but says he intends to return Narnia to its people. Lord Sopespian, one of Miraz's generals, kills Miraz with an arrow and blames the Narnians, igniting a massive battle between the Narnians and the Telmarines. Lucy, meanwhile, has found Aslan in the woods; he awakens the trees, and the whole forest suddenly attacks the Telmarines. Lord Sopespian orders the retreat, only to be confronted by Lucy and Aslan. Aslan summons a river god, who wipes out most of the Telmarine army, including Sopespian; the surviving Telmarine soldiers surrender to the Narnians.

Caspian becomes the King of Narnia and, with Aslan's help, brings peace between the Narnian and Telmarine kingdoms. Before the Pevensies depart, Peter and Susan reveal that Aslan has told them they will never re-enter Narnia again since they have learned all they can from Narnia, but Edmund and Lucy might still come back. The Pevensies return to England, leaving Caspian as King of Narnia.

== Cast ==
Pevensies:

- Georgie Henley as Lucy Pevensie. Henley acknowledged Lucy represents faith in the story, being the youngest and therefore most open-minded of the Pevensies. During filming, Henley's baby teeth were falling out, so she wore fake teeth to fill in the gaps.
- Skandar Keynes as Edmund Pevensie, the third oldest Pevensie. Edmund matured during the events of The Lion, the Witch and the Wardrobe, so the writers saw him "as our Han Solo", "[doing] the right thing" and "probably going to be a little low-key about it", highlighting the immaturity of his older brother. Keynes bruised his heel when performing a stunt where he jumped onto a horse. He narrowly missed landing on it and hit his foot against a column when holding on. Excepting that, he enjoyed performing the action.
- William Moseley as Peter Pevensie. In a departure from the novel, Peter has a rivalry with Caspian. Moseley explained, "Peter's got his own issues to deal with, and Caspian's got his own issues to deal with, and when neither is willing to compromise, there's bound to be friction. Peter came back to Narnia expecting to be king again and that everyone would do as he said, and Caspian is unwilling to let him take over, so that causes some of it. That's really what happens. And it's a lot about humility. I think they both have to learn a certain humility [...] and that's really what a great king needs is to be humble, to listen to his people, to be willing to compromise, and they start off as these sort of angry teenagers, and become kings at the end." In real life, the two actors got on well together. Moseley also stated that he identified with Peter, having gone back to school between shooting both films. He trained for three months in New York City to improve his performance and his physicality.
- Anna Popplewell as Susan Pevensie, the second oldest Pevensie. Popplewell had been disappointed she barely used her bow and arrows in the first film. Adamson convinced Douglas Gresham to have her present during the battles by suggesting her passive role in the novel indicated Lewis' view of women before he met Joy Gresham. "I think [Lewis] cast women down in the earlier books, but when you look at The Horse and His Boy, it has a strong female character. Doug's mother was a strong woman." Adamson also chose to have her fall for Caspian, because "The kids are growing up. If you look at Ben and you look at Anna, it seems really implausible that they wouldn't have some feelings for each other." He knew it had to be "sensitively handled" though, and ultimately it is not about romance, but "[accepting] the fact that you can have a wondrous experience, enjoy it and move on". Popplewell added that it would not make sense for the Narnians not to use Susan, a talented archer, in battle, and that the romance contributed to her character's reconciliation with losing Narnia in the first place.

Telmarines:

- Ben Barnes as Prince Caspian X. Adamson said "Caspian is a coming-of-age and, to some degree, a loss of innocence story, with Caspian starting out quite naïve, then craving revenge and finally letting go of the vengeance." Andrew Garfield auditioned for the role, but was passed up for not being "handsome enough" according to his agent. Nicholas Hoult also auditioned. While in the novel Caspian is a 13-year-old child, in the film he is a 15-year-old adult young man. Barnes had read the novel as a child, and was cast in two and a half weeks after meeting with the filmmakers. He spent two months in New Zealand horse riding and stunt training to prepare for shooting. Barnes modelled his Spanish accent on Mandy Patinkin's performance as Inigo Montoya in The Princess Bride, though he also had a dialect coach aiding him. Adamson did not expect to cast a British actor as Caspian, and said Barnes fitted well into the surrogate family of Adamson and the four actors playing the Pevensies. When cast, Barnes was set to tour with the Royal National Theatre's production of The History Boys: producer Mark Johnson joked Barnes "probably isn't the Nation's favourite actor right now". Barnes left England without telling the Theatre. They were furious when they found out that he had left them without permission, so they considered suing him for breach of contract, but decided against it.
- Sergio Castellitto as King Miraz. Castellitto was not familiar with the novel, but his four children had enjoyed the first film. Miraz marks the first time the Italian actor has portrayed a villain, and he found it interesting to "act out a stereotype." Nonetheless, he also felt that he and Adamson brought depth to the role, explaining Miraz is a soldier, not a coward, and that he takes the throne for his son. He compared the character to King Claudius in Hamlet.
- Pierfrancesco Favino as General Glozelle, Miraz's military commander, who plots with Sopespian to have his king killed in combat with Caspian and Peter in order to lead his own attack on the Narnians. However, in the end, Glozelle repents and is the first to volunteer to go into the Pevensies' world, and in return, is granted a good future by Aslan. This was Favino's idea, because originally Glozelle would have died in battle. Adamson dubbed the character "a real Benedict Arnold". Favino is able to speak several languages and generally acted as a translator to Adamson on set while working with actors and crew members of multiple nationalities.
- Damián Alcázar as Lord Sopespian. "In some ways Sopespian turns out to be the real bad guy of the film", Adamson said. "Where it seems that Miraz has the upper hand at the beginning, we see that Sopespian, like Shakespeare's Iago, is trying to manipulate the situation". Alcázar was originally offered the role of Miraz, but once the filmmakers were informed that his little height would prevent him from intimidating Barnes' taller Caspian, Adamson decided to cast him as Sopespian, promising him to still give him a larger role.
- Vincent Grass as Dr. Cornelius: Caspian's mentor, who is half-dwarf. Adamson compared Caspian and Cornelius's relationship to Aristotle and Alexander the Great. Cornelius's role in the movie is significantly smaller than in the novel, and he is not named on screen, being referred to only as "Professor".
- Alicia Borrachero as Queen Prunaprismia. Prunaprismia was Miraz's wife. When she had learned that her husband had killed his own brother, she became heartbroken. After Miraz's death, Prunaprismia was the second volunteer to go back to our world (with her child). Because of her repenting, Prunaprismia and her child were promised a good life back in our world.
- Simón Andreu as Lord Scythley.
- Predrag Bjelac as Lord Donnon.
- David Bowles as Lord Gregoire. He served as one of the marshals during the duel between Peter and Miraz.
- Juan Diego Montoya Garcia as Lord Montoya.

Narnians:

- Liam Neeson reprises his role as the voice of the lion Aslan. Aslan is "more parental here, [he] lets the kids, well, make their own mistakes". Aslan's entrance was filmed as a dream sequence to emphasize his messianic nature, and not make it reflect badly on his absence when Narnia is in turmoil. Although the character is considered C.S. Lewis' version of Jesus, Neeson "see[s] him more as the spirit of the planet—this living, breathing planet. That's what he stands for, for me; more what the native Americans would believe." As Aslan has fewer action scenes than in the first film, the animators found it difficult to make him move interestingly. His pose had to be regal, but if he moved his head too much, he would remind viewers of a dog. As well as having his size increased by fifteen percent, Aslan's eyes were also changed to look less "Egyptian". Many of his shots were finished at the last minute.
- Peter Dinklage as Trumpkin, a cynical red dwarf. Dinklage was Adamson and Johnson's first choice, having seen him in The Station Agent. He accepted because "often, you get the hero and the villain and not much in between. Trumpkin is in between. He is not a lovable Snow White dwarf. Audiences appreciate these cynical characters. It helps parents and adults to go along with the journey." Dinklage's prosthetics took three hours to apply, and restricted his performance to his eyes. Even his frown was built into the make-up. On his first day of filming, he was bitten by sand flies and fell into a river. "We were lucky that he returned after his first day!" recalled Johnson.
- Warwick Davis as Nikabrik, a black dwarf. He is a descendant of Ginarrbrik, who served the White Witch, and bears one of his rings, which was passed down from each generation. Mark Johnson acknowledged casting Davis as the treacherous Nikabrik was casting against type: Berger covered all his face bar his eyelids in prosthetics, to allow Davis to ward off the audience's perceptions of him. Nikabrik's nose was based on Berger. Davis feared filming in the Czech Republic, because the grass is filled with ticks, so he put elastic bands to hold his trousers against his legs. Davis portrayed Reepicheep in the 1989 BBC production of Prince Caspian.
- Ken Stott as the voice of Trufflehunter the badger. Adamson called Trufflehunter "a walking and talking Narnian library [who is] totally old-school". The animators visited a badger sanctuary to aid in depicting his performance.
- Eddie Izzard as the voice of Reepicheep, a swashbuckling mouse. Over 100 actors auditioned to voice the character. Izzard approached Reepicheep as less camp and more of a bloodthirsty assassin with a sense of honour (a cross between Mad Max and a Stormtrooper from Star Wars): Izzard interpreted Reepicheep as someone whose family was killed by the Telmarines. The Narnia series were some of the few books Izzard read as a child, and she cherished them. When discussing Reepicheep with the animators, Adamson told them to rent as many Errol Flynn films as possible. Adamson credits Izzard for making the role her own; beforehand, the director was approaching the character similarly to Puss in Boots in Shrek 2.
- Cornell John as Glenstorm, a centaur. Adamson had seen John perform in Porgy and Bess in London, and liked his long face. John imagined the character as being 170 years old, and wanted to convey "honour, pride and tradition".
  - Lejla Abbasová as Windmane, a centaur who is Glenstorm's wife.
  - Yemi Akinyemi as Ironhoof, a centaur who is Glenstorm's son.
  - Carlos Da Silva as Suncloud, a centaur who is Glenstorm's son.
  - Ephraim Goldin as Rainstone, a centaur who is Glenstorm's son and is among those killed during the night raid.
- David Walliams as the voice of the Bulgy Bear.
- Klara Issova as a Narnian Hag who attempts to resurrect the White Witch. She used some Arabic words in her incantation.
- Gomez Mussenden (son of costume designer Isis Mussenden) as Lightning Bolt, a child Centaur.
- Jan Pavel Filipensky as Wimbleweather, a giant.
- Shane Rangi as Asterius, an elderly Minotaur who aids Caspian. Josh Campbell provides the voice for the character. Asterius is killed during the night raid while holding the gate open to allow some of the army to escape. Rangi also stood in for Aslan, the Bulgy Bear, the werewolf, another Minotaur, and the wild bear on set. Rangi previously played General Otmin in the previous film and Tavros in The Voyage of The Dawn Treader. He was able to see more in the redesigned animatronic Minotaur heads, though "in order to make the eye line straight and correct, you've actually got to hold your head down, so your view is only about a foot and a half in front of you, which still makes it a little bit hard". This resulted in Rangi knocking himself against the rising gate of the Telmarine castle, although he was fine and it was the animatronic head that bore the brunt of the damage. The costumes were still very hot, reducing him to a "walking waterfall". Although a head sculpt of Aslan was used to stand in for the character on the first film, Rangi had to portray the character on set because Lucy interacts with him more. Rangi lost four kilograms wearing all his costumes. Rangi also portrayed the werewolf, and he was the physical stand-in for Aslan, the Bulgy Bear, and the wild bear.

Cameos

- Tilda Swinton reprises her role as Jadis, the White Witch. Her ghost appears as the hag and werewolf attempt to resurrect her. Swinton and her two children also cameoed towards the film's end as centaurs.
- Harry Gregson-Williams (the film's composer) as the voice of Pattertwig, a squirrel. Adamson felt he had a "squirrel-like energy".
- Douglas Gresham as a Telmarine crier.

== Production ==
=== Writing ===
We had some difficulty figuring out how to make Caspian work as a film. In the book, the children arrive in Narnia, and they all sit down around the campfire and Trumpkin tells them the story of Prince Caspian – which means that the four Pevensie children vanish for half of the book.

— Douglas Gresham

Before the release of The Chronicles of Narnia: The Lion, the Witch and the Wardrobe, the screenplay for the sequel Prince Caspian had already been written. Director Andrew Adamson said the decision was made to follow the publication order of the novels because "if we don't make it now we'll never be able to, because the [actors will] be too old". Prince Caspian, the second published novel in the series, is the fourth chronologically. The Horse and His Boy takes place during a time only hinted at in The Lion, the Witch and the Wardrobe. The writers briefly considered combining Caspian with The Voyage of the Dawn Treader, which the BBC did for their television adaptation.

Screenwriters Christopher Markus & Stephen McFeely wanted to explore how the Pevensies felt after returning from Narnia, going from being kings and queens back to an awkward year as school children. They noted, "[C. S. Lewis] doesn't much consider what it would be like for a King of Narnia to return to being a 1940s schoolchild." They also decided to introduce the Pevensies back into Narnia nearer the start, in order to weave the two separate stories of the Pevensies and Caspian, in contrast to the book's structure. A sense of guilt on the Pevensies' part was added, seeing the destruction of Narnia in their absence, as was hubris for Peter to enhance the theme of belief: his arrogance means he is unable to see Aslan.

Adamson also desired to make the film larger in scale; "I've gained confidence having gone through the first. This time, I was able to go larger [in] scale, with more extras and bigger battle scenes." Inspired by a passage in the novel where Reepicheep says he would like to attack the castle, a new battle scene in which Peter and Caspian make an attempted raid on Miraz's castle was created. Adamson felt the imagery of mythological Greek creatures storming a castle was highly original. Markus and McFeely used the sequence to illustrate Peter and Caspian's conflict and Edmund's maturity, in an effort to tighten the script by using action as drama. Adamson preferred subtlety to the drama scenes, asking his young male actors not to perform angrily. Adamson copied Alfred Hitchcock by "tell[ing] people at the end of the scene, 'Now just give me something where you're not thinking about anything.' By using it in context, the audience will read an emotion into it."

=== Design ===
Concept art of Miraz's armour. The Telmarines are stereotypically Spanish in appearance, and their masked helmets are partly based on conquistadors.

Andrew Adamson described the film as being darker, as it takes place "another 1300 years later, [and] Narnia has been oppressed by Telmarines for a large period of that time, so it's a dirtier, grittier, darker place than the last world was". He added, "This one is more of a boy's movie. It's a harsher world. The villains are human, and that lends a more realistic attitude." Creatures were designed by veteran horror and monster concept artist Jordu Schell and supervised by Howard Berger, who said that Prince Caspian would be more medieval than The Lion, the Witch and the Wardrobe. Alongside Adamson, Berger's children critiqued his designs, aiding the process: his son thought the werewolf's ears were silly, so they were made smaller.

For the Narnians, Berger envisioned them as more wild in appearance, as they have been forced into the forests. He also decided to increase the portrayal of various ages, sizes and races. The black dwarfs are distinguished from the red dwarfs as they have more leather and jewellery, and a darker colour scheme in their costumes. Each race of creatures also had their fighting styles made more distinguishable. The Minotaurs have maces, and the centaurs use swords. The satyrs were redesigned, as their creation on the first film had been rushed. Four thousand and six hundred make-up jobs were performed, which Berger believes is a record.

The filmmakers interpreted the Telmarines, including Caspian, as being Spanish because of their pirate origins, which producer Mark Johnson noted made Caspian "a contrast to the lily-white [Pevensies]". Production designer Roger Ford originally wanted the Telmarines to be French, as they had a confrontational history with the English, who are represented by the Pevensies. This was scrapped as the crew were unable to shoot at Pierrefonds Castle, for Miraz's lair, so they went for the Spanish feel. Weta Workshop created masked helmets for their army, and faceplates for the live horses on set. The stunt soldiers wield two hundred polearms in two different styles, two hundred rapiers of varying design, over a hundred falchions, two hundred and fifty shields and fifty-five crossbows. Caspian's own sword is a variation of the Royal Guard's weapons. Costume designer Isis Mussenden looked to the paintings of El Greco to inspire the Telmarines' costumes. She wanted to use colours that looked "acidic and hot and cool at the same time", unlike the red and gold seen in the Narnian soldiers. Their masked helmets are based on conquistadors and samurai. She visited the armour archives of the Metropolitan Museum of Art for inspiration. An eagle emblem was incorporated into the characters' lairs to make them feel fascist.

=== Filming ===
Eight months were spent scouting locations, including Ireland, China and Argentina, before New Zealand, Prague, Slovenia and Poland were chosen. Whereas the previous film was predominantly shot in New Zealand with a few months of filming in Central Europe, Adamson decided New Zealand lacked enough sound stages to accommodate the larger scale of the film. The decision to film most of the picture in Europe also allowed the ability to shoot during summer in both continents, although the weather turned out to be so erratic during filming that Adamson joked he had been lied to.

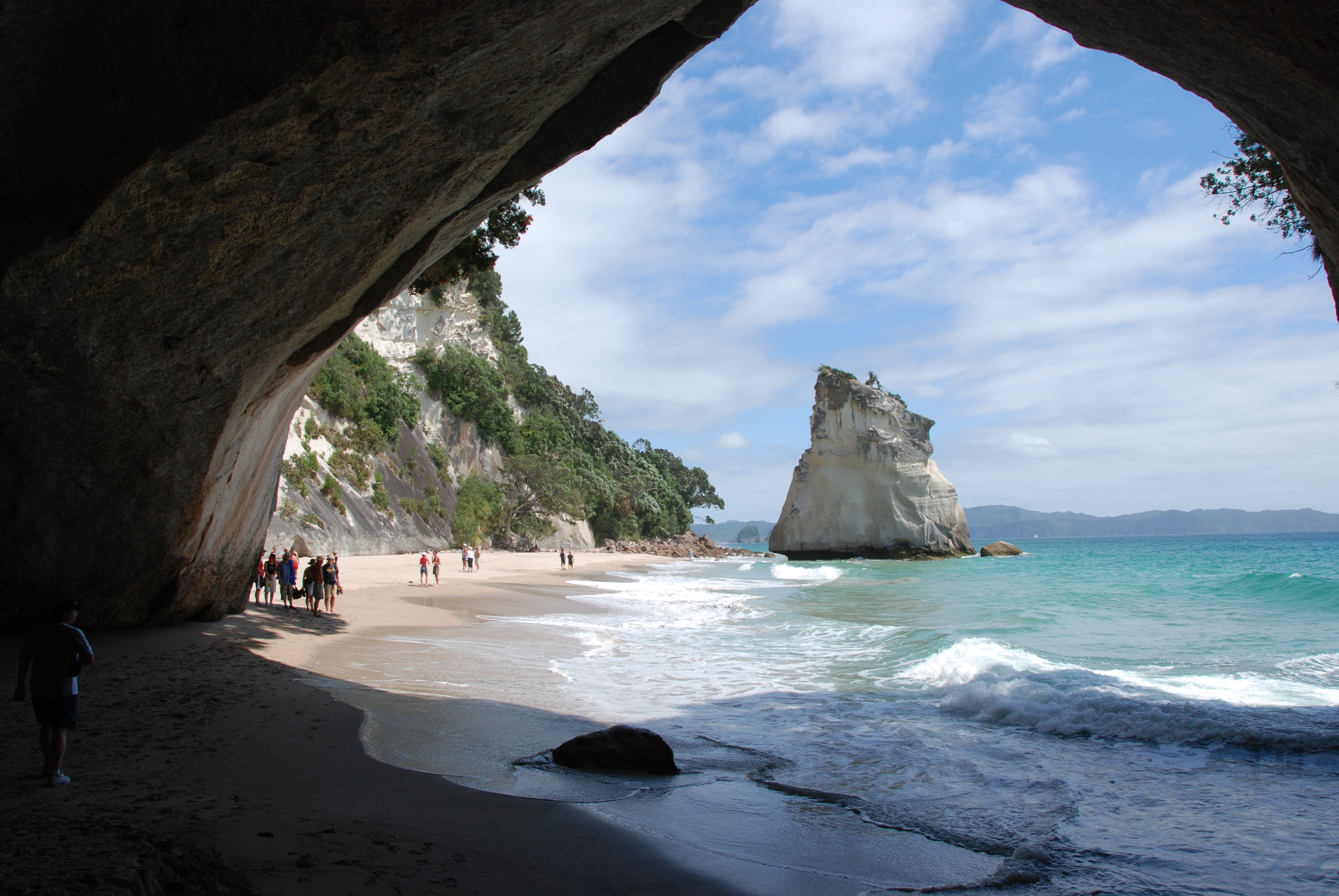
The Pevensies' return to Narnia was shot at Cathedral Cove because of an arch which mirrors the train tunnel the children are transported from.

Filming began on February 12, 2007, in Auckland. The scene where the Pevensies return to the ruined Cair Paravel was shot at Cathedral Cove. The filmmakers chose the location because it had a tunnel-like arch, which echoed the train tunnel the children go into before being summoned back into Narnia. Henderson Valley Studios was used for the Pevensies' ancient treasure room and the Underground station.

On April 1, 2007, the crew began filming at Barrandov Studios in Prague. There, sets such as Miraz's castle, Aslan's How and the underground hiding places of the Narnians were created. The 200-foot-tall (61 m) castle was built to scale because Adamson felt he overused digital sets on the last film. The castle was built in the open air during winter, where the temperature would drop to −4 °F (−20 °C). Miraz's courtyard is the largest set in production designer Roger Ford's career, including the previous Narnia film. Aslan's How was modified into the hideout after filming for those scenes was finished. To create Trufflehunter's den, Ford's crew put a camera inside a badger's den to study what it should look like. The den's roof had to be raised by three inches because Ben Barnes was too tall.

In June 2007, they shot the bridge battle near Bovec in the Soča Valley, Slovenia. The location was chosen for its resemblance to New Zealand. A large bridge was built, which was modelled on the one Julius Caesar built to cross the Rhine. Whereas Caesar supposedly built his bridge in ten days, the filmmakers had around forty. The schedule was short though, but the authorities would only allow them this build time to not completely disrupt normal summer activities on the lake. The filmmakers made a trench to change the river's course, so they could deepen the drained sides of the riverbed so it looked like one could drown in it. The crew also cut down 100 trees for shots of the Telmarines building the bridge; the trees were moved to another side of the river for decoration. The bridge stood for two months before being dismantled. As part of the clean-up, the cut-down trees and parts of the bridge were sent to a recycling plant, while other portions of the bridge were sent to the studio for close-ups shot against bluescreen.

Part of the battle was shot at Ústí nad Labem in the Czech Republic. Only the entrance to Aslan's How was built on location. Adamson wanted Peter and Miraz's duel to feel unique and not like a controlled, overly choreographed fencing match: Moseley and Castellitto began training for the scene in November 2006. The stunt coordinator Allan Poppleton doubled for Castellitto in some shots because they are similar in size. For claustrophobic shots, cameras were built into their shields. The main camera was placed on a 360-degree track surrounding the ruin it takes place on. The filmmakers dug a large hole in the ground for the scene where the Narnians cause the pillars supporting the growth near Aslan's How to collapse on the Telmarines. The earth was then restored following completion of the scene. They also had to restore the grass after filming numerous cavalry charges. 18,000 fern plants were imported to the Czech Republic to create a forest. A scene shot in Poland, which involved building a cliff face, also had to leave no trace behind. Filming finished by September 8, 2007.

=== Visual effects ===
Prince Caspian has over 1,500 visual effects shots, more than The Lion, the Witch and the Wardrobe's 800 visual effects shots, yet the film had less time to complete them. The scale of visual effects led Andrew Adamson to base production in the UK, to take advantage of new tax credits. Therefore, it legally qualifies as a British film. This also meant the director only had to walk five minutes from the editing room to supervise the effects. British visual effects companies the Moving Picture Company (MPC) and Framestore CFC were hired to create the visual effects alongside Weta Digital. Framestore worked on Aslan, Trufflehunter and the door in the air; Scanline did the River-god; Weta created the werewolf, the wild bear and Miraz's castle; MPC and Escape Studios did the main battle, the tunnel scene, the castle assault, the council scenes and all the other creatures.

Alex Funke, who worked on The Lord of the Rings, directed the film's miniatures unit. These include 1/24- and 1/100-scale miniatures of Miraz's castle. A scale model was built of the Narnians' cave hideouts during the climactic battle, which the actor playing the giant Wimbleweather was filmed against. One of the improvements made over the previous film was to make the centaurs walk during dialogue scenes, so Cornell John as Glenstorm wore Power Risers (mechanical stilts with springs), to mimic a horse's canter and height. The animatronic Minotaur heads were also improved to properly lip sync, although this was not as successful as hoped and had to be revamped digitally.

In the climactic battle, 150 extras stood in for the Narnians, while 300 extras were used for the Telmarines. These were digitally duplicated until there were 1,000 Narnians and 5,000 Telmarines onscreen. The animators found it easier to create entirely digital centaurs and fauns, rather than mix digital legs with real actors. The dryads were entirely computer-generated, whereas in the first film digital petals had been composited over actors. However, Adamson had chosen to make the centaurs not wear armour, meaning the animators had to make the human–horse joint behave more cohesively. Combining digital characters with actors, such as when Lucy hugs Aslan, had become easier since the first film, as lighting had improved. To achieve Lucy hugging Aslan, Framestore even replaced Georgie Henley's arm with a digital version. For the gryphons, a motion control rig was created for the actors to ride on. The rig could simulate subtle movements such as wing beats for realism. Adamson cited the river-god as the character he was most proud of. "It was a really masterful effect: to control water like that is incredibly difficult", he said. "The [visual effects company] told us they'd been waiting to do a shot like that for ten years."

The film features catapults resembling windmills, that can fire rapidly, and a ballista that can fire three projectiles at a time. The practical versions of these were metal with fibreglass painted and aged to resemble wood on top. Weta created props of the missiles thrown by the Telmarine equipment. The practical version of the catapult had its upper half painted blue, to composite a digital version programmed for rapid firing movement.

=== Music ===
The Lion, the Witch and the Wardrobe composer Harry Gregson-Williams began composing the sequel in December 2007. Recording began at Abbey Road Studios the following month, and finished by April 2008. The Crouch End Festival Chorus, Regina Spektor's song, "The Call", Oren Lavie's song, "Dance 'Round The Memory Tree" and Switchfoot's song, "This Is Home", are featured on the soundtrack. Imogen Heap, who sang "Can't Take It In" for the first film, wrote a new song which Gregson-Williams considered too dark.

Gregson-Williams' score is darker to follow suit with the film. Gregson-Williams wanted Caspian's theme to convey a vulnerability, which would sound more vibrant as he became more heroic. It originally used a 3/4 time signature, but the opening scene required a 4/4 and thus it was changed. To represent Miraz's cunning, the heroic theme from the first film was inverted. For Reepicheep, a muted trumpet was used to present his militaristic and organised character. Gregson-Williams considered arranging his theme for a small pennywhistle, but found that it sounded too cute and broke the tension of the night raid.

== Release ==
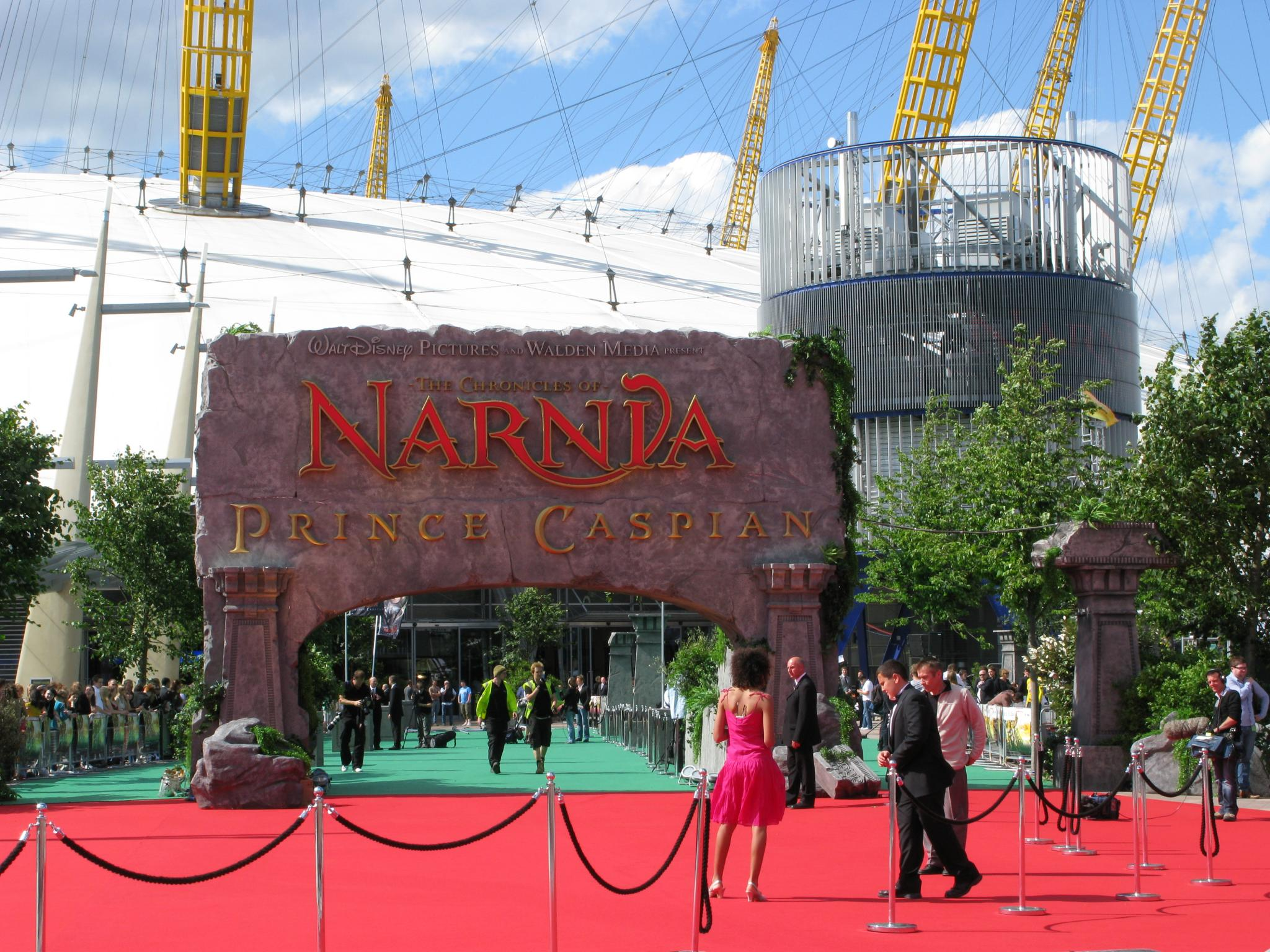
Entrance to the O2 premiere in London on June 19, 2008

During pre-production, Disney announced a December 14, 2007 release date, but pushed it back to May 16, 2008, because Disney opted to not release it in competition with The Water Horse, another Walden Media production. Disney also felt the Harry Potter films comfortably changed their release dates from (Northern Hemisphere) winters to summers, and Narnia could likewise do the same because the film was darker and more like an action film. The world premiere was held at the Ziegfeld Theatre in New York City on May 7, 2008. The British premiere was held at the O2 Arena on June 19, the first time the dome has hosted a film screening. Around 10,000 people attended the event, the proceeds of which went to Great Ormond Street Hospital. It was the last The Chronicles of Narnia film to be co-produced by Walt Disney Pictures as 20th Century Fox became the distributor for the next film, The Chronicles of Narnia: The Voyage of the Dawn Treader (2010), due to budgetary disputes between Disney and Walden Media, but as a result of Disney eventually purchasing 21st Century Fox in 2019, Disney now owns the rights to all the films in the series.

The film opened in 3,929 theaters in the United States and Canada on May 16, 2008. The Motion Picture Association of America gave the film a PG. To earn this rating, which the filmmakers were contractually bound by Disney to do, Adamson altered a shot of a fallen helmet to make clear that it did not contain a severed head. Adamson made numerous edits to the film beforehand after showing the film to a young audience, explaining "When you sit down and you're watching it, and you see the kids' faces while making the film, you're just making an attempt, you're making it exciting, you're doing all of these things because you're essentially making the film for yourself. When you start showing it to an audience, that then influences how you feel about the film."

=== Marketing ===
Adding to the film's $225 million budget (almost $100 million of which were spent on the effects), Disney also spent $175 million on promoting the film. Play Along Toys created a playset of Miraz's castle, a series of 3 3/4-inch and 7-inch action figures, and roleplaying costumes. Weta Workshop's Collectibles unit also created statues, busts and helmets based on their props for the film, and there was also a Monopoly edition based on the film. In the UK, Damaris Trust was commissioned to produce resources relating to the film for churches and schools, which are available from the official UK Narnia website. In June 2008, the Journey into Narnia: Prince Caspian Attraction opened at Disney's Hollywood Studios, featuring a recreation of the Stone Table, behind-the-scenes footage, concept art, storyboards, props and costumes from the film. The tone of the film's marketing focused on the film's action, and unlike The Lion, the Witch and the Wardrobe Disney and Walden did not screen the film for pastors or give Bible-based study guides in North America.

== Home media ==
Prince Caspian was released on DVD and Blu-ray Disc in the UK on November 17, 2008, and on December 2, 2008, in North America. It was the top-selling DVD of its release week in the U.S. taking in $54.7 million. The film was released in Australia on November 27, 2008. There were one-disc and three-disc DVD editions (two-disc only in the UK), and two-disc and three-disc Blu-ray Disc editions (two-disc only in the UK). The first two discs contain an audio commentary by Adamson, blooper reel, deleted scenes and documentaries, while the third disc contains a digital copy of the film. For the Blu-ray Disc, Circle-Vision 360° was used to allow viewers to watch the night raid from different angles. An additional disc of special features was only made available in Japan and Zavvi stores in the UK, while a separate version containing a disc of electronic press kit material was exclusive to Sanity stores in Australia. By the end of 2008, the film earned almost $71 million in DVD sales.

== Reception ==
=== Critical response ===
The review aggregator website Rotten Tomatoes reported that 66% of critics gave the film positive reviews, with an average rating of 6.4/10, based on 188 reviews. The site's critical consensus reads, "The Chronicles of Narnia: Prince Caspian is an entertaining family adventure worthy of the standard set by its predecessor." Metacritic reported the film had an average score of 62 out of 100, based on 34 critics, indicating "generally favorable reviews". Audience members polled by CinemaScore gave the film an average grade of "A−" on an A+ to F scale.

Film critic Leonard Maltin gave the film 3 out of 4 stars (as he did with The Lion, The Witch, and The Wardrobe), calling the performances "strong", the storytelling "solid", and the scenery "breathtaking", though he also said, "it's a dark tale, and the climactic battle scenes go on at length."

Two film industry trade journals gave the film positive reviews. Todd McCarthy of Variety felt Adamson's direction had a "surer sense of cinematic values" and praised the improved special effects, the "timeless" locations and production design. On the performances, he felt "the four kids overall have more character and are therefore more interesting to watch than they were before, and Italian actor Castellitto registers strongly with evil that's implacable but not overplayed." Michael Rechtshaffen of The Hollywood Reporter noted the film was darker than its predecessor, with "the loss of innocence theme ... significantly deepened". He highlighted Peter Dinklage's performance, which "outmaneuver[ed] the title character as Narnia's most colorful new inhabitant".

A number of critics took issue with what they interpreted as the film's underlying messages. San Francisco Chronicle critic Mick Lasalle wrote in his parental advisory that "basically, this is a movie about kids who go into another world and dimension and spend the whole time killing people." MSNBC reviewer Alonso Duralde noted that "all the heroes have British accents while the Telmarines are all decidedly Mediterranean in appearance and inflection". An Anglican Journal review described the movie as reasonably faithful to the adventure elements of the book, much lighter on the religious faith aspects, which they found integral to the novel and deficient on character and emotion.

The Visual Effects Society nominated it for Best Visual Effects and Best Compositing. It was nominated for Best Fantasy Film, Best Costumes, Best Make-up, and Best Special Effects at the Saturn Awards. Keynes and Henley received nominations at the Young Artist Awards.

In 2010, Mark Johnson, a producer from all of the Narnia movies, admitted that "We made some mistakes with Prince Caspian and I don't want to make them again." He also said Prince Caspian lacked some of the "wonder and magic of Narnia," was "a little bit too rough" for families, and was too much of a "boys' action movie."

=== Box office ===
When released on May 16 in the United States and Canada, the film grossed $55 million from 8,400 screens at 3,929 theaters in its opening weekend, ranking #1 at the box office, taking that spot from Marvel's Iron Man which premiered on May 2. Disney said it was happy with the film's performance, although the opening fell short of industry expectations of $80 million and was also behind The Lion, The Witch and the Wardrobe's opening gross of $65.6 million. By June 1 it grossed $115 million, while the first film had grossed $153 million in the same amount of time. Disney CEO Robert Iger attributed the film's underperformance to being released between two of the year's biggest hits, Iron Man and Indiana Jones and the Kingdom of the Crystal Skull.

On May 16, the film also opened at number one in twelve other countries, grossing $22.1 million, and bringing the worldwide opening total to about $77 million. The film opened in Russia with $6.7 million, the biggest opening of the year; it earned $6.3 million (15% more than the first) in Mexico; $4 million in South Korea, making it in the third-most-successful Disney film there; $2 million from India, which was triple the gross of the first; and it earned $1.1 million in Malaysia, making it the country's third-most-popular Disney film after the Pirates of the Caribbean sequels. The film also opened with $1 million in Argentina on June 13, which was Disney's third-biggest opening in the country and the biggest of 2008 at that time. Prince Caspian made $141.6 million in the United States and Canada while the worldwide total stands at $419.7 million. The movie was the tenth-highest-grossing film of 2008 worldwide, and was Disney's second-highest-grossing film of 2008 after WALL-E.

== Accolades ==
Year	Award	Category/Recipient	Result
2008	MTV Movie Awards	Best Summer Movie So Far	Nominated
2008	Teen Choice Awards	Choice Movie: Action	Won
2008	Teen Choice Awards	Choice Movie: Male Breakout Star (Ben Barnes)	Nominated
2008	National Movie Awards	Best Family Film	Nominated
2008	National Movie Awards	Best Performance – Male (Ben Barnes)	Nominated
2009	People's Choice Awards	Favorite Family Movie	Nominated
2009	Costume Designers Guild Awards	Excellence in Costume Design for Film – Fantasy	Nominated
2009	Golden Reel Awards	Best Sound Editing – Sound Effects, Foley, Dialogue and ADR in a Foreign Feature Film	Nominated
2009	Visual Effects Society Awards	Outstanding Visual Effects in a Visual Effects Driven Motion Picture	Nominated
2009	Visual Effects Society Awards	Outstanding Compositing in a Feature Motion Picture	Nominated
2009	Young Artist Award	Best Performance in a Feature Film – Young Ensemble Cast (Georgie Henley, Skandar Keynes, William Moseley, Anna Popplewell)	Nominated
2009	Young Artist Award	Best Performance in a Feature Film – Leading Young Actress (Georgie Henley)	Nominated
2009	Young Artist Award	Best Performance in a Feature Film – Leading Young Actor (Skandar Keynes)	Nominated
2009	Taurus World Stunt Awards	Best Fight	Nominated
2009	BMI Film & TV Awards	BMI Film Music Award	Won
2009	MTV Movie Awards	Breakthrough Male Performance (Ben Barnes)	Nominated
2009	Saturn Awards	Best Fantasy Film	Nominated
2009	Saturn Awards	Best Costume	Nominated
2009	Saturn Awards	Best Make-Up	Nominated
2009	Saturn Awards	Best Visual Effects	Nominated
