= The Dreaming (musical) =

The Dreaming is a 2001 musical written by Howard Goodall and Charles Hart, based on William Shakespeare's A Midsummer Night's Dream but reset in the Edwardian period.

== Synopsis ==
=== Act One ===
Jack, a young blacksmith's son, sits at the edge of the forest, waiting for the arrival of "Thursday's Children", mythical fairy creatures that supposedly live in the forest, appearing only at Midsummer's Eve.

Midsummer's Day also happens to be the coming of age of Lord Melstock, a local noble, who has escaped from the stress of ruling. He tells his wife Henrietta about the legend of the local spirits that dwell in the forest, who supposedly would light bonfires at Midsummer ("Dream Nights"). They are interrupted by the local groundsman, Matthews, who reports that his daughter Charlotte has eloped with a local boy, Alexander, despite being engaged to David Swann, a local Captain and former betrothed of Jennifer Farthing, the Admiral's daughter. Swann has pursued his beloved with Jennifer in tow, surmising that Alexander and Charlotte will try to escape through the woods and make their way to Scotland to be married.

Also in the forest that night is the Reverend Herbert Plum, who is hoping to perform his new "musico-dramtico gersamkuntswerk" at the ball the following. He and his fellow thespians perform ("The Cuckoo Song") before discussing the business of rehearsal. Lead actor Nick Cheek suggests a final rehearsal at the Membury Stones at the centre of the forest. ("The Cuckoo Song" (reprise)).

Jack finds himself at the centre of the wood ("Thursday's Children" (reprise)), and is startled by Sylvia and her woodlanders, who ask of his background. Before he can join them, they are interrupted by Angel, Sylvia's paramour, and the two bands fight over Jack, Sylvia eventually leaving in a fury. Angel vows vengeance for this slight ("Heart of the Wood"). He asks Jack to prove himself to the Woodlanders by fetching a herb that only grows this one night, and sprinkling it on the eyes of the sleeping Sylvia. The herb will make the sleeper fall in love with the first purpose their waking eyes look upon ("Love in Idleness"). Jack obeys, discovering Sylvia and her attendants as they sing of her sadness in love, before laying down to sleep ("Night of Silence").

Returning from the fairy bed, Angel notices Charlotte and Alexander lying separately and, assuming they are lovers who have fallen out, asks Jack to sprinkle the herb on Alexander's eyes too ("Love in Idleness" (reprise)). However, he happens to notice newly arrived Jennifer when he wakes, and falls madly in love, much to her horror ("Jennifer").

The actors are rehearsing their play ("The Ballad of St George") largely unsuccessful, with Jess Dunn the farm boy complaining his part (the dragon's rear-end) is too small. When he is recast as the Princess the show continues, but when Cheek disappears to make his entrance, the actors are horrified to see him return transfigured into a goat. They flee into the woods, while the confused Cheek bumps into Sylvia's camp and causes her to fall in love with him. ("Act One Finale").

== Characters ==
- Jack the central figure of the play, who goes to join the spirits. He corresponds to Puck as well as the Indian Boy from the original play.

=== The gentry ===
- Julian, Lord Melstock a local young aristocrat who is about to celebrate his coming of age. (Corresponds to Theseus)
- Henrietta, Melstock's wife, who tries to remind him that his title does not mean he cannot enjoy himself. (corresponds to Hippolyta)
- Matthews, Melstock's gamekeeper, whose daughter Charlotte has eloped against his wishes. He constantly compares Melstock to his father. (Corresponds to Egeus)
- Bowles, Melstock's butler.

=== The lovers ===
- Captain David Swann, a pompous young military officer formerly betrothed to Jennifer, but in love with Charlotte. (Corresponds to Demetrius)
- Jennifer Farthing, daughter of the local Admiral, in love with David. (Corresponds to Helena)
- Alexander a penniless young man in love with Charlotte. (Corresponds to Lysander)
- Charlotte Matthews a somewhat vain young woman, she prefers Alexander (whom she calls her "lambkin") over David. (Corresponds to Hermia)

=== The actors ===
- Reverend Herbert Plum leader of the Midsummer Mummers acting troupe, he longs to be like his hero, the Vicar of Morwenstow. (Corresponds to Peter Quince)
- Nick Cheek, butcher the confident leading man of the troupe, he finds himself transfigured upon entering the forest. (Corresponds to Nick Bottom)
- Jess Dunn, Bob Fry, Seth Wilmot and Walter Grubb, the actors.

=== The Woodlanders ===
- Angel, king of the Boy Woodlanders, arrogant and cunning. (Corresponds to Oberon)
- Sylvia, queen of the Girl Woodlanders, proud and possessive. (Corresponds to Titania)

== Productions ==
The play was initially performed by the National Youth Music Theatre, in 2001, including in its ensemble Ben Barnes, Katie Hall and Ed Sanders. In 2012, it was staged at Leicester's Curve theatre, with Lauren Jones being the first female actress to play the role of Jack. It also featured Bradley Foster, who later played Darwin in the West End production of The Wider Earth, as Julian.

A production of The Dreaming directed by Paul Clarkson played London's Union Theatre in September 2014.
