= A Quiet Outpost =

- Film poster
- Russian: Тихая застава
- Directed by: Sergey Makhovikov
- Written by: Sergey Makhovikov
- Produced by: Yuri Konovalov
- Starring: Andrey Chadov; Sergey Selin; Igor Savochkin; Aleksandr Alyoshkin; Yuri Konovalov
- Cinematography: Maksim Shinkorenko
- Edited by: Alexander Hachko
- Music by: Eduard Artemyev
- Release date: January 20, 2011
- Country: Russia
- Language: Russian

A Quiet Outpost (Russian: Тихая застава) is a 2011 Russian war drama film directed by Sergey Makhovikov.

== Plot ==
The film tells about the battle of Afghan and Tajik militants with the Russian army, which occurred at the 12th border outpost of the Moscow border detachment in the Republic of Tajikistan on July 13, 1993.

== Cast ==
- Andrey Chadov as Capt. Andrey Pankov
- Sergey Selin as Sgt. Vladimir Gritsyuk
- Igor Savochkin as Lt. Aleksandr Bobrovskiy
- Aleksandr Alyoshkin as Trasser
- Yuri Konovalov as Sgt. Durov
- Anusher Bachonayev as Abdulla
- Maksim Dimkovich as Maks
- Timur Efremenkov as Nazarin
- Radzhab Khuseynov as Zakir
- Nina Kornienko as Olga Nikolayevna
