= Ben Barnes (actor) =

English actor (born 1981)

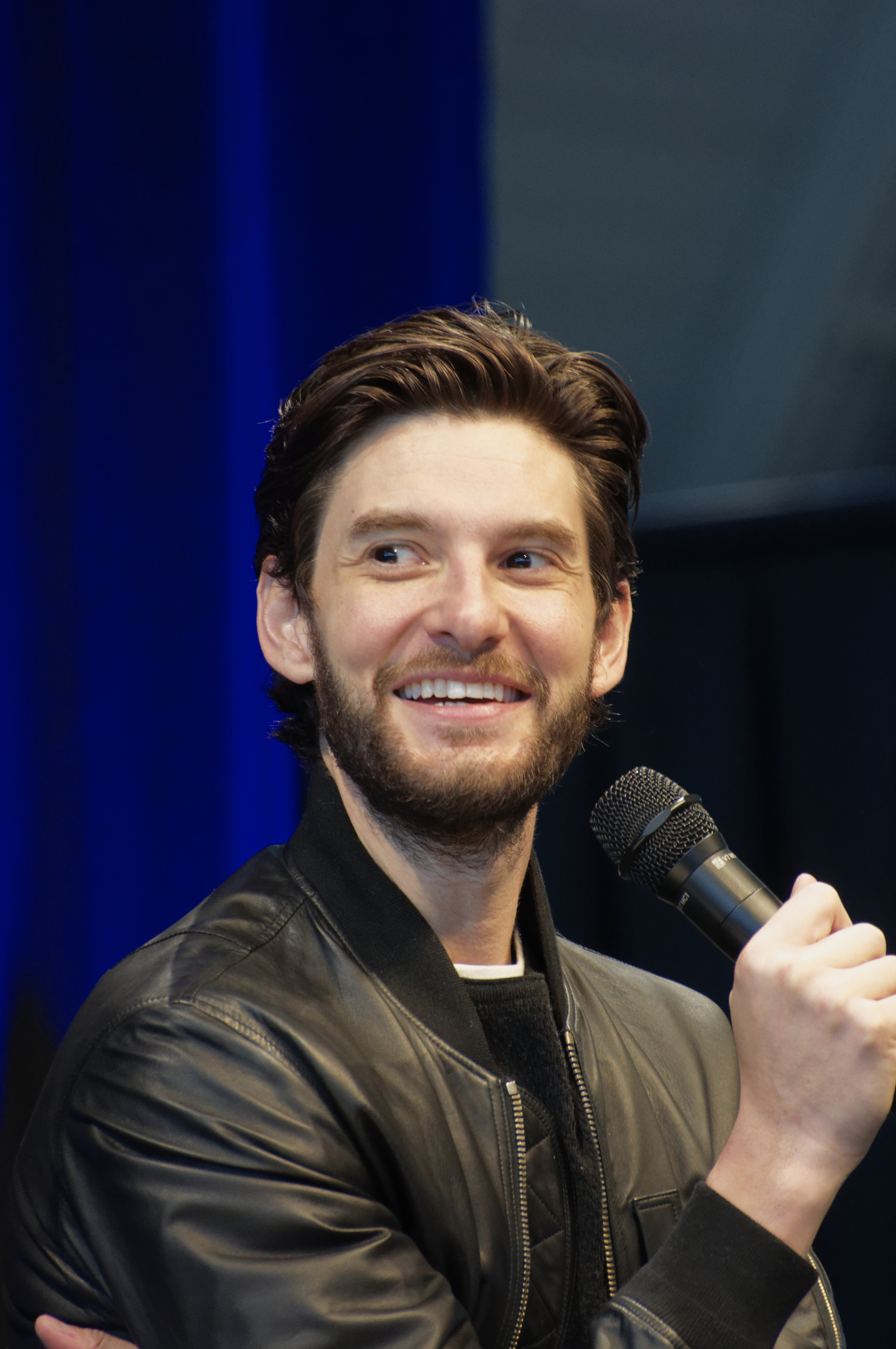
- Barnes at the 2021 Comic-Con Germany
- Born: Benjamin Thomas Barnes; 20 August 1981 (age 45); London, England
- Education: Kingston University (BA)
- Occupations: Actor; musician
- Years active: 1997–present
- Spouse: Aubrey Cleland (m. 2026)
- Website: www.benbarnesfan.com

Benjamin Thomas Barnes (born 20 August 1981) is an English actor and singer. He is best known for his roles as Prince Caspian in The Chronicles of Narnia film series (2008–2010), Logan Delos in the HBO science fiction series Westworld (2016–2020), Billy Russo/Jigsaw in the Marvel series The Punisher (2017–2019), The Darkling in the Netflix series Shadow and Bone (2021–2023), and Tim Jamieson in the MGM+ supernatural series The Institute (2025–present).

He also played young Dunstan Thorn in Stardust (2007), the title role in Dorian Gray (2009), Neil McCormick in Killing Bono (2011), Alejandro in The Big Wedding (2013), Tom Ward in Seventh Son (2014), Samuel Adams in Sons of Liberty (2015) and Benjamin Greene in Gold Digger (2019).

Also known for his contributions to the soundtracks of films in which he appeared, Barnes released his debut single "11:11" in September 2021. This preceded the release of his debut extended play, Songs For You. His debut album, Where The Light Gets In, was released on January 10, 2025.

== Early life and education ==
Barnes was born on 20 August 1981 in southwest London to Patricia Becker, a relationship psychotherapist, and Thomas Barnes, a psychiatrist and professor. He has a younger brother, Jack. Barnes cites his mother's Jewish South African childhood, his father's scientific education, and his attendance at what he felt was a "vaguely Christian" school where he "liked the hymns" as formative influences.

Barnes was educated at two independent schools for boys: Homefield Preparatory School in Sutton and King's College School in Wimbledon. In King's, he sang in choirs and played percussions (drums and piano) in jazz orchestras and concert bands. In 1997 he began his career in musical theatre by joining the National Youth Music Theatre where, at age sixteen, he gave his first performance as a drummer in the West End musical adaptation of Bugsy Malone. Prior to university, he spent two years singing, television presenting, and working with entertainment svengali Simon Fuller to open a jazz club and release an album, both of which did not materialise.

Barnes then studied English literature and drama at Kingston University, appearing and directing in productions such as Don Juan (alongside Katrina Drovandi as the lead), The Golden Age, Exposure and The Zoo Story. He won the English Prize for writing essays on themes from Harry Potter and The Hobbit. While working at the theatre on intense acts such as The Ragged Child, The Dreaming, Loving Ophelia, Sex, Chips & Rock n' Roll, he briefly joined the boyband Hyrise, who performed in Eurovision: Making Your Mind Up, to find the UK's entry for the 2004 Eurovision Song Contest, with 'Leading Me On'. Graduating in 2004 with a BA (Hons) in Drama with English Literature, he was the university's first drama student to achieve first-class honours. In 2008, he was inducted in the university's Wall of Fame, the youngest to be featured among more than twenty accomplished alumni.

== Career ==
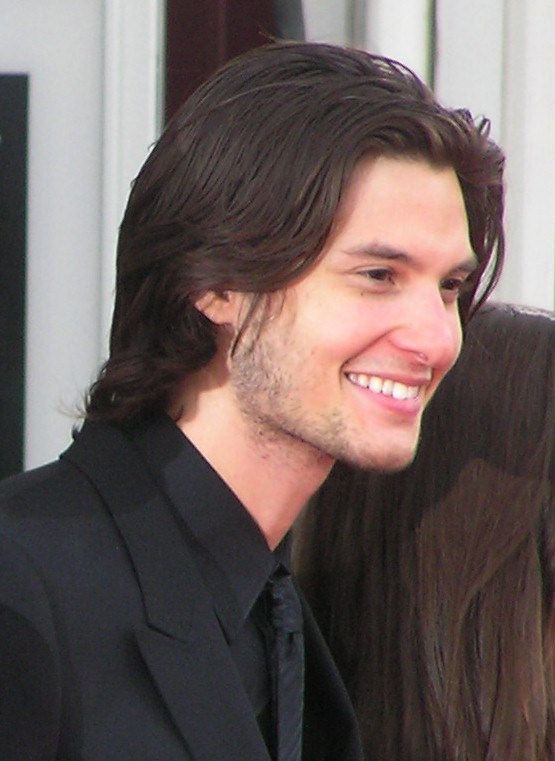
Barnes at the UK premiere of The Chronicles of Narnia: Prince Caspian in 2008

Barnes began working on television in 2006, including a guest appearance on the UK series Doctors. That same year, he joined the ensemble cast of a West End production of The History Boys, in which he starred and received acclaim as the sexually provocative Dakin.

Barnes made his feature film debut as young Dunstan Thorn in Stardust (2007), directed by Matthew Vaughn and based on Neil Gaiman's novel of the same name. He starred as a Russian hoodlum named Cobakka in Suzie Halewood's Bigga than Ben (2008).

In June 2008, Barnes gained recognition for his role as Prince Caspian in The Chronicles of Narnia: Prince Caspian, directed by Andrew Adamson. Adamson described the film as "a coming of age and, to some degree, a loss of innocence story, with Caspian starting out quite naïve, then craving revenge and finally letting go of the vengeance." While many readers interpret Caspian as a child, a passage in the novel mentions his age to be near that of Peter's, so an older actor was sought to match William Moseley. Barnes was cast two and a half weeks after meeting with the filmmakers, and fitted well into the surrogate family of Adamson and the four actors playing the Pevensies. He spent two months in New Zealand riding and stunt training in preparation. His Mediterranean accent in the film was inspired in part by Mandy Patinkin's performance as Inigo Montoya in The Princess Bride. Barnes also voiced his character in the video game The Chronicles of Narnia: Prince Caspian. His portrayal earned him nominations from the 2008 National Movie Awards for Best Male Performance, the 2008 Teen Choice Awards for Choice Movie Breakout Male, and the 2009 MTV Movie Awards for Best Breakthrough Male.

In November 2008, Barnes starred in the role of John Whittaker opposite Jessica Biel and Colin Firth in Stephan Elliott's romantic comedy Easy Virtue, based on Noël Coward's play of the same name. The score contained Coward and jazz-age songs, three of which were sung by Barnes. He then starred as the title character in Dorian Gray, a film adaptation of Oscar Wilde's novel, directed by Oliver Parker and released in September 2009. In the psychological thriller Locked In, directed by Suri Krishnamma and released in September 2010, he played Josh, an American father whose daughter seems to be in a coma due to a car accident.

Barnes reprised his role as King Caspian in The Chronicles of Narnia: The Voyage of the Dawn Treader, the third instalment in the film series. Directed by Michael Apted and filmed in Australia, it premiered in November 2010 at a Royal Film Performance in London and had a theatrical release in December. He received a nomination at the 2011 National Movie Awards for Performance of the Year.

Barnes returned to the West End stage in London with a starring role as World War I soldier Stephen Wraysford in Birdsong, a drama based on Sebastian Faulks's novel of the same title. The play, directed by Trevor Nunn and adapted by Rachel Wagstaff, opened on 28 September 2010 and ran through 15 January 2011.

In April 2011, he played Neil McCormick in Killing Bono, a comedy based on McCormick's memoir I Was Bono's Doppelgänger, in which McCormick recounts his youth in Ireland as an aspiring rock star who is overshadowed by his friend Bono, the lead singer of U2. The Hollywood Reporter says Barnes and his co-star Robert Sheehan "convincingly portray young talents who were in the right place at the right time but made the wrong moves".

In September 2012, Barnes appeared in The Words as a young American soldier and literary genius stationed in France during the end of World War II, who fell in love with a French waitress and whose manuscript gets lost in post-war era. Though his performance was physical with little to no dialogue, Screen Rant described his character's story as "easily the most fascinating element of the film" and called his performance "solid" which "beautifully captures the many profound emotions — love, loss, and regret — that his character experienced."

He then played Alejandro in The Big Wedding, a remake of the original 2006 French film Mon frère se marie (My brother is getting married) released in April 2013.

In December 2014, Barnes starred as Nick Tortano, an associate of a local mafia boss, in the modern day crime drama By the Gun. In the same month was the release of the fantasy film Seventh Son in which he played Tom Ward. Directed by Sergei Bodrov, it is based on the novel The Spook's Apprentice by Joseph Delaney.

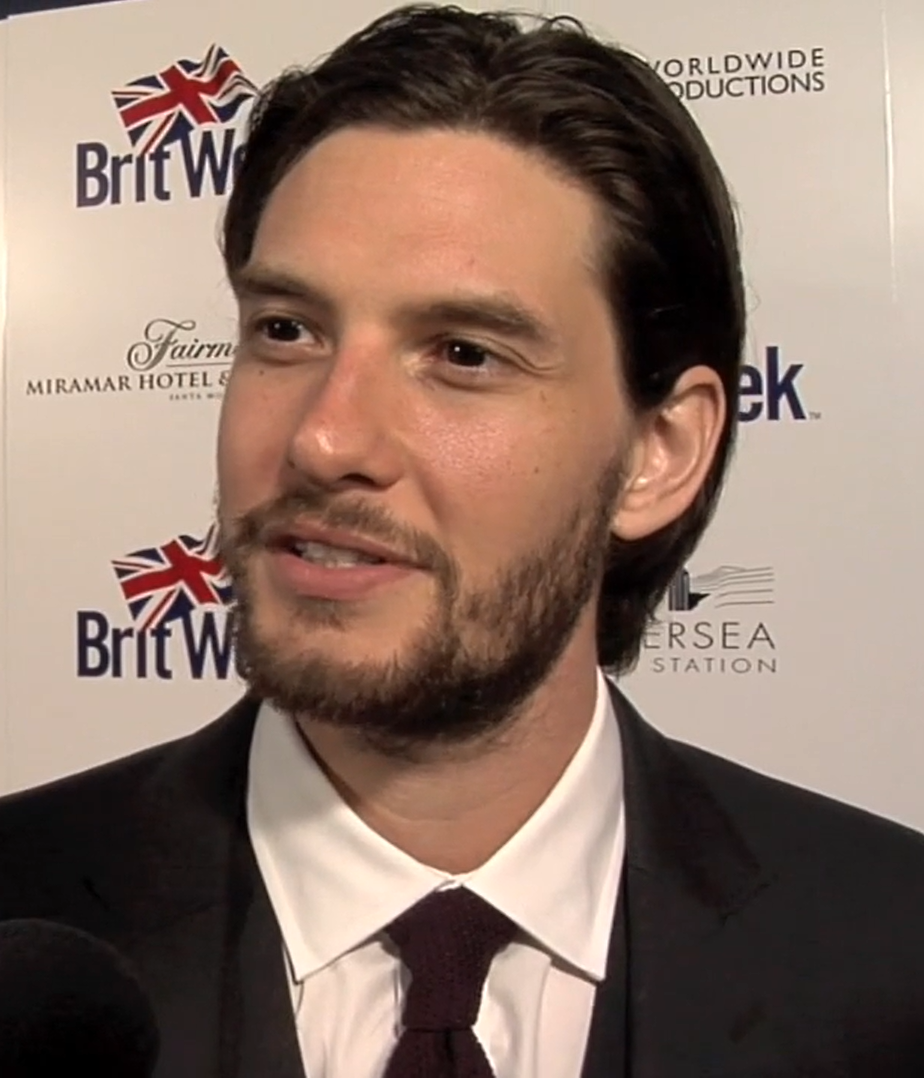
Barnes at Brit Week in 2015

In January 2015, Barnes portrayed Sam Adams, a tax collector for the British government, in History Channel's three-part miniseries Sons of Liberty. He also starred as guitarist and singer Ryan Brenner, reuniting with Katherine Heigl in the romantic drama Jackie & Ryan, released in US cinemas in July 2015. Variety wrote that with "his male-model features shamelessly lapped up by the camera from the opening frame onwards, [Barnes] is as limber and likeable as he's yet appeared on screen, his native accent convincingly hidden behind a middle-American husk." Barnes would later regard this character as his most favourite to portray, "I enjoyed all the music from that film and found Ryan a soulful character to embody, which made me try to re-evaluate how complicated life can get."

In HBO's dystopian science fiction series Westworld, based on the 1973 film of the same name and the first season of which aired in October 2016, Barnes played the young businessman Logan Delos, the uninhibited heir apparent of Delos Corporation who led their company's investment into Westworld, a technologically built Wild West-themed amusement park populated by android "hosts". The cast received a nomination for Outstanding Performance by an Ensemble in a Drama Series at the 2017 Screen Actors Guild Awards.

Barnes portrayed Billy Russo, a former sniper who started his own private military company Anvil, in The Punisher, a Netflix adaptation set in the Marvel Cinematic Universe, the first season of which aired in November 2017. Barnes described his character as "someone who's very narcissistic, vain and greedy, and sees himself in an extremely powerful alpha way" and who is also "fueled by a broken and abused past." He consulted his psychotherapist parents to ensure the authenticity of his depiction of the veteran's mental health issues.

He returned in a recurring role as Logan Delos in the second season of Westworld which premiered in April 2018. In January 2019, he reprised his role as a scar-faced Billy Russo in the second season of The Punisher. In this season Barnes said he "had freedom to explore the trauma of brain damage and memory loss and the frustration, anger and pain that accompanies that." He then played the 36-year-old charming copywriter Benjamin Greene who pursued a 60-year-old wealthy divorcée in BBC One's miniseries Gold Digger. Originally broadcast weekly on BBC One from November 2019, it was aired on Acorn TV in May 2020 for US audience.

In October 2019, Barnes was cast as General Kirigan (the Darkling) in the 2021 Netflix fantasy series Shadow and Bone. The series overall received mixed reviews from critics, but Barnes' performance garnered more praise, with Empire describing him as "dashing", and Rolling Stone and Radio Times praising his performance as General Kirigan.

In 2023-2025, Barnes appeared in a number of advertisements for cell phone provider T-Mobile US, outfitted in a magenta suit.

== Personal life ==
Barnes married American Idol alum Aubrey Cleland in October 2026.

== Filmography ==
=== Film ===
Year	Title	Role	Notes
2007	Stardust	Young Dunstan Thorn	
2008	Bigga than Ben	Cobakka	
2008	The Chronicles of Narnia: Prince Caspian	Prince/King Caspian X	
2008	Easy Virtue	John Whittaker	
2009	Dorian Gray	Dorian Gray	
2010	Locked In	Josh Sawyer	
2010	The Chronicles of Narnia: The Voyage of the Dawn Treader	King Caspian X	
2011	Killing Bono	Neil McCormick	
2012	The Words	The Young Man	
2013	The Big Wedding	Alejandro Griffin	
2014	Jackie & Ryan	Ryan Brenner	
2014	By the Gun	Nick Tortano	
2014	Seventh Son	Thomas "Tom" Ward	
2023	The Critic	Stephen Wyley	
2026	East of the River	Joey	

=== Television ===
Year	Title	Role	Notes
2000-2001	S Club TV	Presenter	
2006	Doctors	Craig Unwin	Episode: "Facing Up"
2006	Split Decision	Chris Wilbur	TV film
2015	Sons of Liberty	Samuel "Sam" Adams	Miniseries
2015	Exposed	Stoya	TV film
2016–2020	Westworld	Logan Delos	Main role season 1; recurring role season 2
2017–2019	The Punisher	Billy Russo / Jigsaw	Main role; 25 episodes
2019	Gold Digger	Benjamin Greene	Miniseries
2021–2023	Shadow and Bone	General Kirigan / The Darkling	Main role
2022	Guillermo del Toro's Cabinet of Curiosities	William Thurber	Episode: "Pickman's Model"
2023	Black Mirror	TV Mac	Episode: "Joan Is Awful"
2025 - 2026	The Institute	Tim Jamieson	Main role; 16 episodes

=== Music videos ===
Year	Title	Artist	Ref.
2014	"Imagine" (UNICEF: World version)	Various	
2016	"Where's the Love?"	Black Eyed Peas featuring The World	
2020	"Soteria"	Mt. Wolf	

=== Video games ===
Year	Title	Role	Notes
2008	The Chronicles of Narnia: Prince Caspian	Prince Caspian X	Video game

== Stage ==
Year	Title	Role	Notes
1997	Bugsy Malone	Drummer	National Youth Music Theatre
1997	The Ballad of Salomon Pavey	Ralph	National Youth Music Theatre
1999	The Ragged Child	Anthony Ashley-Cooper	National Youth Music Theatre
2001	The Dreaming	Alexander	National Youth Music Theatre
2002	Someone Who'll Watch Over Me	Michael	National Youth Music Theatre
2003	Exposure	Harry Larkyns	Kingston University Drama on Stage
2004	Loving Ophelia	Dante Gabriel Rossetti	The Pleasance Theatre
2005	Blag: The Musical	Jimmy Jesus	New Musicals
2005	Sex, Chips & Rock n' Roll	Justin DeVere Montague / The Wolf	The Royal Exchange Theatre Company
2005	Talking to Mr. Warner	Corelli	New Musicals
2006–2007	The History Boys	Dakin	Wyndham's Theatre
2010	Birdsong	Stephen Wraysford	Comedy Theatre

== Discography ==
=== Studio albums ===
Title	Details
Where The Light Gets In	Released: 10 January 2025; Label: Independent, under exclusive license to Kartel Ltd

=== Extended plays ===
Title	Details
Songs For You	Released: 15 October 2021; Label: Independent, under exclusive license to Virgin; Format: Digital download, streaming, LP, CD

=== Singles ===
Title	Year	Album
"11:11"	2021	Songs For You
"Beloved"	2024	Where The Light Gets In
"Nevermind"	2024	Where The Light Gets In
"Slow It Down"	2025	Where The Light Gets In

=== Other appearances ===
Title	Year	Album
"A Room with a View"	2008	Easy Virtue Soundtrack
"I'll See You Again"	2008	Easy Virtue Soundtrack
"When the Going Gets Tough, The Tough Get Going"	2008	Easy Virtue Soundtrack
"Do Anything You Wanna Do"	2011	Killing Bono Soundtrack
"Some Kind of Lovin"	2011	Killing Bono Soundtrack
"Cry Baby"	2011	Killing Bono Soundtrack
"Where We Want To Be"	2011	Killing Bono Soundtrack
"Kicking Off Again"	2011	Killing Bono Soundtrack
"Sleepwalking"	2011	Killing Bono Soundtrack
"Better Way"	2011	Killing Bono Soundtrack
"On My Own"	2011	Killing Bono Soundtrack
"Love Never Dies"	2011	Killing Bono Soundtrack
"Play Dead"	2011	Killing Bono Soundtrack
"La Marseillaise"	2012	The Words
"Georgia Crawl"	2015	Jackie & Ryan Soundtrack
"Last Kind Words"	2015	Jackie & Ryan Soundtrack
"Dance All Night"	2015	Jackie & Ryan Soundtrack
"I Know You Rider"	2015	Jackie & Ryan Soundtrack
"Southbound"	2015	Jackie & Ryan Soundtrack
"Sitting on Top of the World"	2015	Jackie & Ryan Soundtrack
"900 Miles"	2015	Jackie & Ryan Soundtrack
"Birds Fly"	2015	Jackie & Ryan Soundtrack
"As the Road Goes"	2015	Jackie & Ryan Soundtrack

== Awards and nominations ==
Year	Award	Category	Work	Result	Refs
2008	Teen Choice Awards	Choice Movie Breakout Male	The Chronicles of Narnia: Prince Caspian	Nominated	
2009	MTV Movie Awards	Breakthrough Performance Male	The Chronicles of Narnia: Prince Caspian	Nominated	
2011	National Movie Awards	Performance of the Year	The Chronicles of Narnia: The Voyage of the Dawn Treader	Nominated	
2017	Screen Actors Guild Awards	Outstanding Performance by an Ensemble in a Drama Series	Westworld	Nominated	
