= Snipers: Love under the Crosshairs =

- Genre: War drama; Romantic drama
- Directed by: Zinovy Roizman
- Starring: Tatyana Arntgolts; Wolfgang Cerny; Alexander Ustyugov; Andreas Helgi Schmid
- Composer: Evgeniy Shiryaev
- No. of seasons: 1
- No. of episodes: 8

Production
- Producers: Ruben Dishdishyan; Aram Movsesyan; Elena Denisevich
- Running time: 50 minutes
- Production company: Mars Media

Original release
- Network: C1R
- Release: 2012

Snipers: Love under the Crosshairs (Russian: Снайперы: Любовь под прицелом, romanized: Snaypery: Lyubov pod pritselom) is a 2012 Russian 8-episode war-drama miniseries directed by Zinovy Roizman. The series is about a young male and female sniper who are on opposing sides during the WWII. The series aired on Channel One Russia.

== Plot ==
Set against the backdrop of World War II, the plot follows the intertwined destinies of Ekaterina and Alexander, a Soviet schoolgirl and a young German, whose love is tested by the realities of war.

Following the signing of a non-aggression pact between Germany and the USSR, Ekaterina and Alexander believe their love transcends borders, only to be abruptly torn apart. Without warning, Alexander vanishes, reemerging amidst the brutal realities of war in 1943.

As skilled snipers, they find themselves on opposing sides of the conflict, with Ekaterina leading a women's battalion and Alexander commanding German riflemen. Their story unfolds amidst the chaos of large-scale military operations and the destruction of vital infrastructure, including a strategic hydroelectric power station.

== Cast ==
- Tatyana Arntgolts - as Ekaterina Radonova
- Wolfgang Cerny - as Alexander von Foss
- Aleksandr Ustyugov - as Capt. Subbotin
- Andreas Helgi Schmid - as Günther Schmidt
- Yuri Nazarov - as Starshina Denis a.k.a. 'Uncle Gosha'
- Dmitry Bykovsky-Romashov
- Valeria Lanskaya - as Viktoriya
- Svetlana Ustinova - as Lyudmila 'Lyusya' Sokolova
- Sergey Marin - as Nikolay Telyatnik
- Svetlana Smirnova-Katsagadzhieva - as Tatyana

== Production ==
This was Wolfgang Cerny's first role in Russian language - the Austrian actor started studying the language only after getting cast in the series.
