= Birdsong (play) =

Play adaptation by Rachel Wagstaff

Birdsong was a 2010 adaptation of the novel of the same title by Sebastian Faulks. The text was written by Rachel Wagstaff, and the premiere production was directed by Trevor Nunn. That production began previews at the Comedy Theatre in London on September 18, 2010, and opened on September 28, 2010. The West End stage production's cast included Ben Barnes as Stephen Wraysford, Genevieve O'Reilly as Isabelle, Nicholas Farrell as René Azaire, Iain Mitchell as Bérard, Lee Ross as Jack Firebrace and Zoe Waites as Jeanne. Other cast members included Owain Arthur, Billy Carter, Florence Hall, Paul Hawkyard, Gregg Lowe, Joe Coen, Jack Hawkins, James Staddon and Annabel Topham. The play closed on January 15, 2011. The play reopened January 31, 2018 with its last show being performed July 21, 2018.

== 2018 cast and crew ==
- Firebrace - Tim Treloar
- Stephen - Tom Kay
- Isabelle - Madeleine Knight
- Tipper - Alfie Browne-Sykes
- Berrard - Jeffrey Harmer
- Lisette - Olivia Bernstone
- Shaw - Simon Lloyd
- Azaire - Martin Carroll
- Jeanne - Liz Garland
- Marguerite - Alice Brittain
- Evans - Riley Carter
- Cartwright - James Findlay
- Director - Trevor Nunn
- Playwright - Rachel Wagstaff
- Designer - John Napier
