= Last Weekend (2005 film) =

- Russian: Последний уик-энд
- Directed by: Pavel Sanayev
- Written by: Pavel Sanayev
- Produced by: Leonid Litvak; Mikhail Litvak; Vladimir Zheleznikov
- Starring: Ivan Stebunov; Tatyana Arntgolts; Ilya Sokolovsky; Artyom Semakin; Rytis Skripka
- Cinematography: Gennadi Engstrem
- Edited by: Pavel Sanayev
- Music by: Aleksandr Dronov
- Release date: 2005
- Country: Russia
- Language: Russian

Last Weekend (Russian: Последний уик-энд) is a 2005 Russian thriller directed by Pavel Sanayev.

== Plot ==
The film tells two intertwining stories: the relationship of a young man and a girl, as well as the story of a group of guys who decided to destroy the body of an accidentally deceased friend.

== Cast ==
- Ivan Stebunov as Kirill
- Tatyana Arntgolts as Katya
- Ilya Sokolovsky as Gleb
- Artyom Semakin as Mishka
- Rytis Skripka as Anton
- Yuriy Kutsenko
- Konstantin Isaev asGAI inspector
- A. Kuzkin
- Dmitriy Lyamochkin
- A. Nikolayev
