= Zinovy Roizman =

Russian film and animation director (1941–2022)

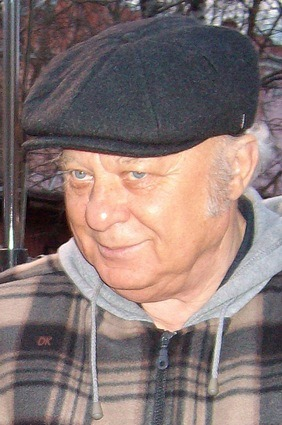
Roizman in 2010

Zinovy Aleksandrovich Roizman (Russian: Зиновий Александрович Ройзман; 11 September 1941 – 6 June 2022) was a Russian film and animation director and screenwriter. He is well known for directing the miniseries Snipers: Love under the Crosshairs and Empire Under Attack.
