= Kaliningrad Regional Drama Theatre =

Theatre in Kaliningrad, Russia

Coordinates: 54°43′11″N 20°29′33″E

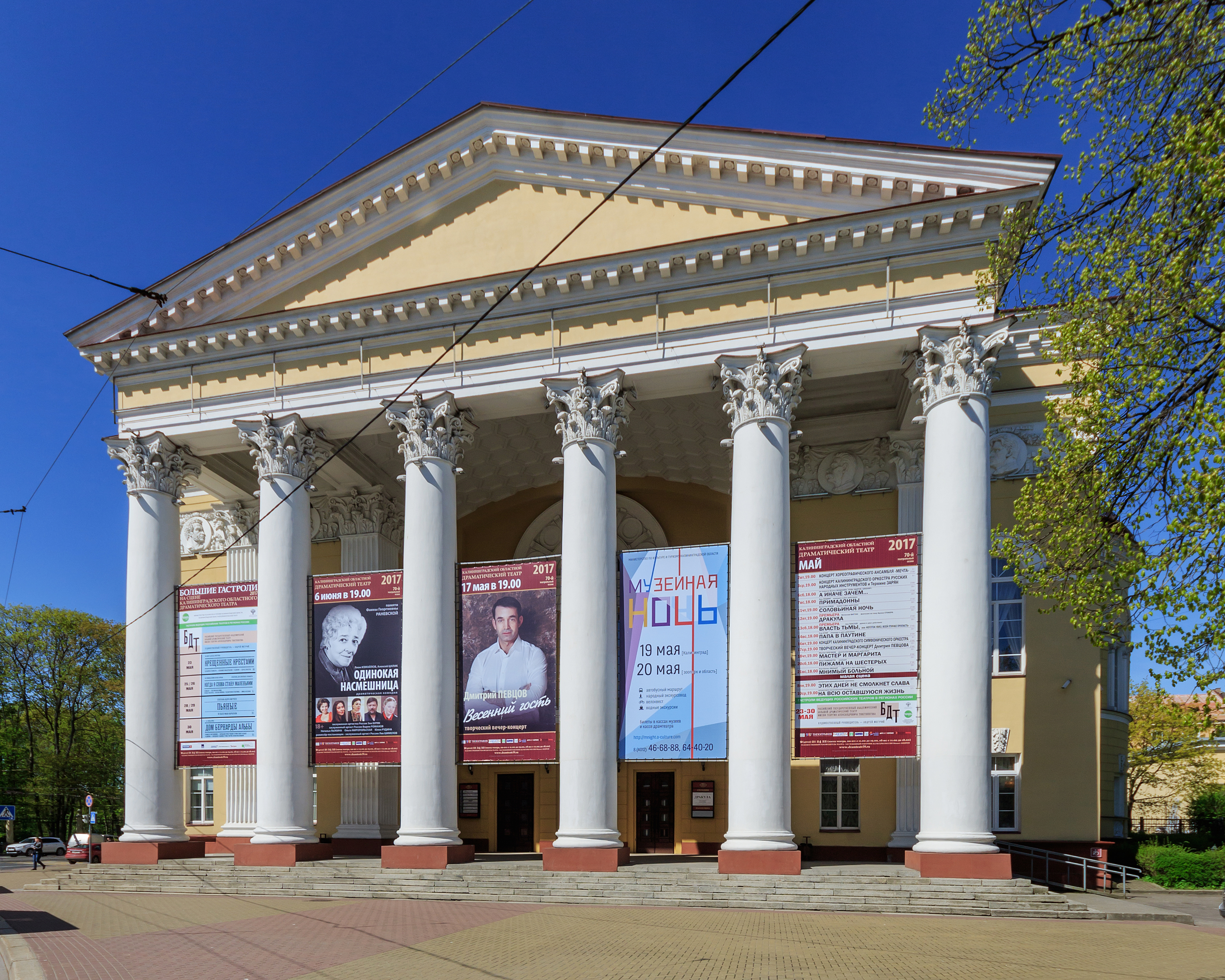
Kaliningrad Regional Drama Theatre

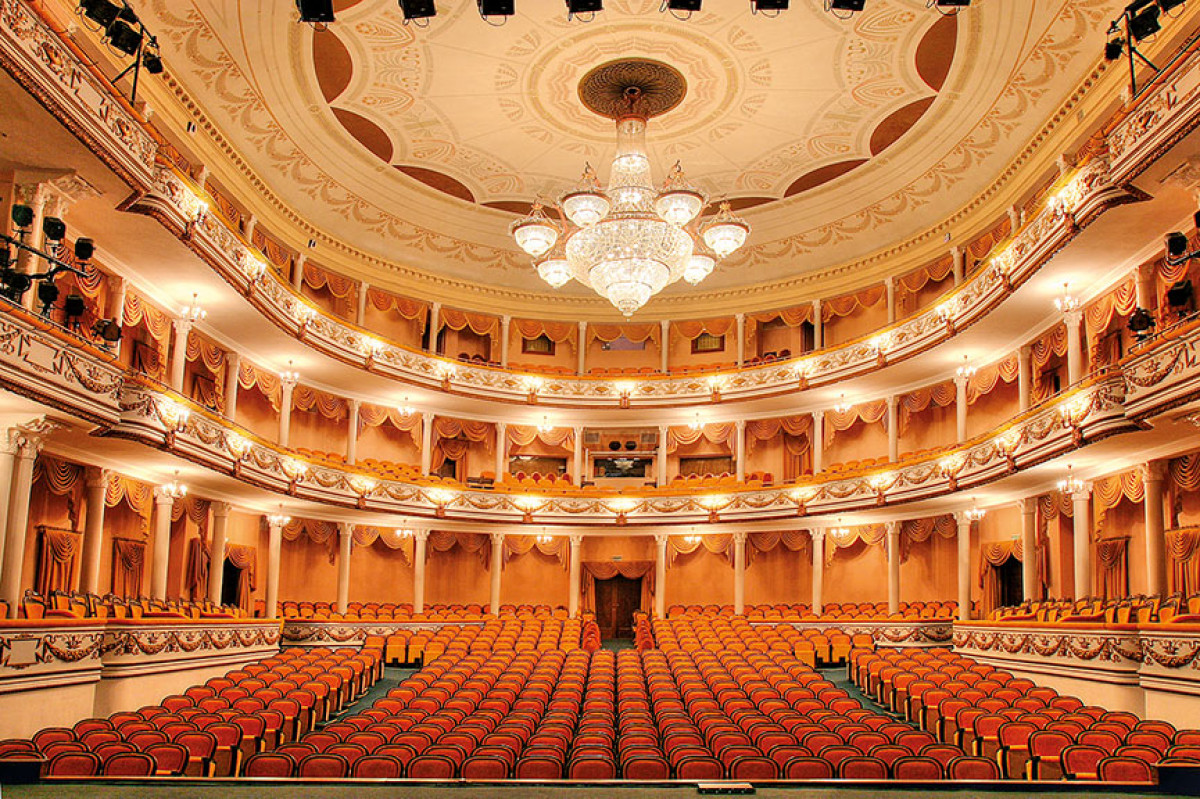
Hall of the Kaliningrad Drama Theater

The Kaliningrad Regional Drama Theatre (Russian: Калининградский областной драматический театр) is a theatre in Kaliningrad, Russia.

The city of Königsberg, Germany, was granted to the Soviet Union in 1945 and subsequently renamed Kaliningrad. The new Kaliningrad theatre was created in 1947 and originally located on Basseynaya Street (formerly Ratslinden in Ratshof) in western Kaliningrad. Most of its actors were graduates of the State Institute for Theatre Arts. The new theatre premiered with Konstantin Simonov's Lad from Our Town. Other plays within its repertoire include works by Anton Chekhov, Aleksandr Ostrovsky, Maxim Gorky, and Bertolt Brecht.

In 1960 the company moved to its present location on Mira Avenue, where the Neues Schauspielhaus once stood. That theatre had been destroyed during World War II, but architect P. V. Kuhtenkov designed the new Kaliningrad theatre according to similar plans and part of the original foundation. It reopened on 22 April 1960.
