= Mafia: The Game of Survival =

- Theatrical release poster
- Directed by: Sarik Andreasyan
- Written by: Andrei Gavrilov
- Produced by: Sarik Andreasyan; Ghevond Andreasyan; Vladimir Polyakov; Max Oleynikov; Nikita Argunov
- Starring: Viktor Verzhbitsky; Veniamin Smekhov; Yuri Chursin
- Cinematography: Anton Zenkovich
- Edited by: Georgiy Isaakyan
- Music by: Roman Vishnevsky; Alim Zairov
- Production companies: Enjoy Movies; Renovatio ent.
- Distributed by: Karoprokat
- Release date: January 1, 2016
- Running time: 91 minutes
- Country: Russia
- Language: Russian
- Budget: $12–15 million
- Box office: US$7.4 million

Mafia: The Game of Survival (Russian: Мафия: Игра на выживание, romanized: Mafiya: Igra na vyzhivanie) is a 2016 Russian science fiction action film directed by Sarik Andreasyan and written by Andrei Gavrilov. It was inspired by a popular party game, Mafia. The movie was released in Russia on January 1, 2016.

== Plot ==
In 2072, the television game show Mafia features eleven participants who are divided into two groups: civilians and Mafia members. The participants attempt to determine the identities of the Mafia members while the Mafia members seek to eliminate the civilians. The game involves elimination of participants and includes a cash prize for the winner. In the show's fictional premise, participants who are eliminated are killed.

== Cast ==
- Viktor Verzhbitsky as Supreme Organizer game
- Veniamin Smekhov as Luka Sergeyevich
- Yuri Chursin as Konstantin
- Vyacheslav Razbegaev as Vladimir
- Andrey Chadov as Ilya
- Vadim Tsallati as Kirill
- Violetta Getmanskaya as Katerina
- Natalia Rudova as Mariya
- Eugene Koryakovsky as Pyotr
- Alexey Grishin as Krivoy
- Artyom Suchkov as Ivan
- Karen Badalov as Psychologist
- Vsevolod Kuznetsov as Lead Voice
- Alexander Gagarinov as Kirill's friend

== Release ==
The film was released in Russia on January 1, 2016. It was released in China on October 14, 2016.

== Reception ==
=== Box office ===
The film grossed US$4.2 million in Russia and the CIS and US$3.1 million in China, to worldwide total of 7,4 million, against an approximately $12 to $15 million budget. It is considered a box office bomb.

=== Critical reception ===
Reception of Mafia: The Game of Survival in Russian media was negative. It was largely ignored by mainstream critics, because Enjoy Movies did not screen the movie for press. According to the Russian review aggregator Kritikanstvo, only 8 reviews were published, and most of them were strongly negative, including reviews from KG-Portal, 25 Kadr and Kinokadr.

== See also ==
- Mafia (party game)
