= Emergency Landing (2023 film) =

- Directed by: Sarik Andreasyan
- Written by: Aleksey Gravitsky
- Produced by: Gevond Andreasyan; Sarik Andreasyan; Vadim Vereshchagin; Ekaterina Muratova; Ilya Shuvalov; Ekaterina Shuvalova; Grigory Hakobyan; Edgar Hakobyan
- Starring: Egor Beroev
- Music by: Manuk Ghazaryan
- Production company: Andreasyan Brothers Film Company
- Distributed by: Central Partnership
- Release date: March 16, 2023
- Running time: 90 minutes
- Country: Russia
- Language: Russian
- Budget: 165,000,000 ₽
- Box office: $4.7 million

Emergency Landing (Russian: На солнце, вдоль рядов кукурузы, translit. Na solnce, vdol' riadov kukuruzy) is a 2023 Russian aviation film directed by Sarik Andreasyan, telling about the successful emergency landing of a passenger plane near Zhukovsky on August 15, 2019. The main role is a man, pilot Damir Kasimovich Yusupov, played by Egor Beroev. The film was released on March 16, 2023.

== Plot ==
The plot of the film is based on a real event that took place on August 15, 2019. The Ural Airlines Airbus A321-211 airliner was carrying out a scheduled flight U6 178 on the route Moscow—Simferopol, but shortly after departure from Zhukovsky Airport, it collided with a flock of seagulls, and both engines failed. The crew managed to land the plane safely in a cornfield. All 233 people on board (226 passengers and 7 crew members) survived, 74 people received injuries of varying severity.

== Cast ==
- Egor Beroev as Damir Yusupov, based on real events.
- Polina Maksimova as Julia
- Mark Bogatyrev as Mikhail
- Olga Khokhlova as Vera
- Herman Modyagin as Georgy
- Jeanne Apple as Tamara
- Lisa Moryak as Vika
- Mikhail Tarabukin as Senior Flight Attendant
- Dmitry Vlaskin as Kirill
- Ksenia Alfyorova as Natalia
- Hrant Tokhatyan as Grant
- Mark Bogatyrev a passenger

== Production ==
Filming began in 2022. The role of Damir Yusupov's pilot was given to Egor Beroev, Yusupov himself became a consultant. The premiere took place on March 16, 2023.
