= Ural Airlines Flight 178 =

2019 aviation accident in Russia

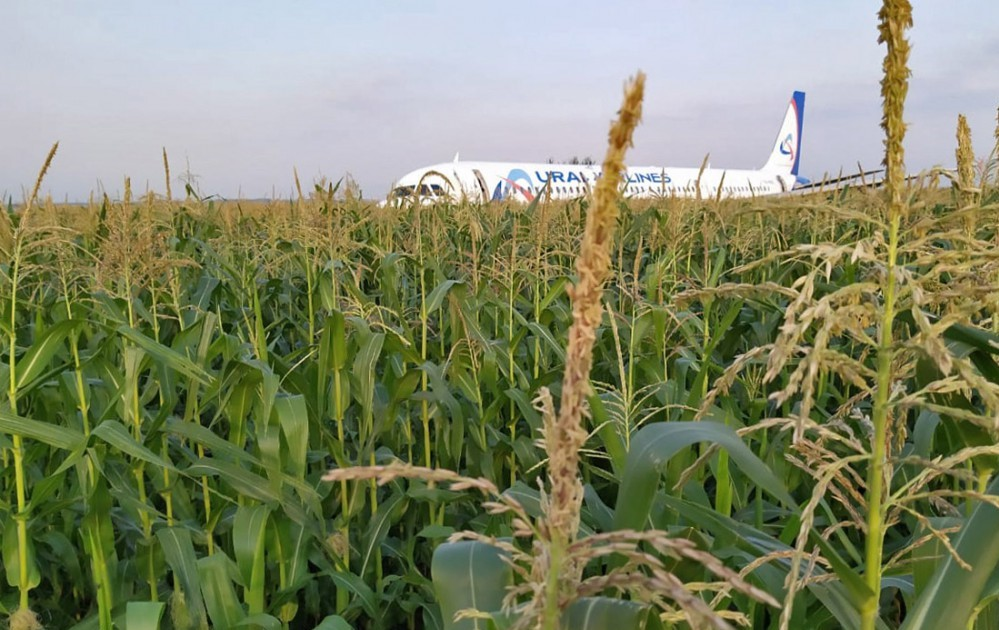
- The aircraft sitting in the cornfield after the landing

Accident
- Date: 15 August 2019
- Summary: Forced landing in cornfield following bird strike and engine damage
- Site: Near Zhukovsky International Airport, Moscow, Russia; 55°30′39″N 38°15′9.34″E

Aircraft
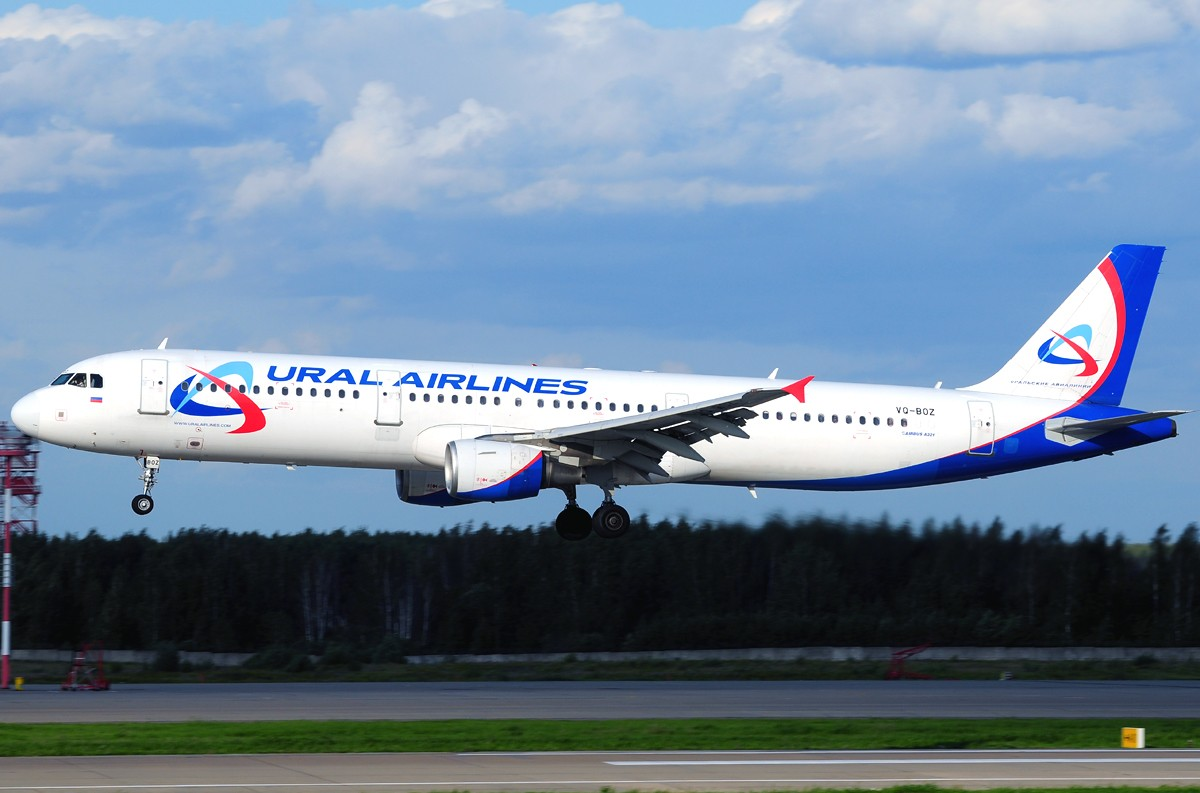
- VQ-BOZ, the aircraft involved, pictured nine days before the accident
- Aircraft type: Airbus A321-211
- Operator: Ural Airlines
- IATA flight No.: U6178
- ICAO flight No.: SVR178
- Call sign: SVERDLOVSK 178
- Registration: VQ-BOZ
- Flight origin: Zhukovsky International Airport
- Destination: Simferopol International Airport
- Occupants: 233
- Passengers: 226
- Crew: 7
- Fatalities: 0
- Injuries: 28
- Survivors: 233

On 15 August 2019, Ural Airlines Flight 178, a scheduled passenger flight from Moscow to Simferopol, suffered engine damage and made a forced landing in a cornfield after takeoff from Zhukovsky International Airport. The aircraft, an Airbus A321 with 226 passengers and 7 crew members, was taking off from Runway 12 when it struck several birds during rotation, causing damage to the engines. Due to the resulting loss of thrust and improper actions by the flight crew, the A321 failed to gain sufficient airspeed and altitude to climb safely. The aircraft belly landed and slid across a cornfield before stopping with substantial damage. All 233 occupants survived the accident, although 28 suffered injuries, 3 of them serious.

In the immediate aftermath of the accident, citizens and the media praised the crew for managing to land and evacuate the aircraft without any fatalities. Comparisons were made to the 2009 US Airways Flight 1549 accident, which ditched in the Hudson River following bird strikes and dual engine failure with no fatalities. The event was referred to as the Miracle in the Cornfield by Russian citizens and media. The Kremlin awarded the flight crew with Hero of the Russian Federation, the country's highest civilian honor, and the cabin crew with the Order of Courage.

The accident investigation was conducted by the Interstate Aviation Committee (MAK). During the investigation, they found several factors that caused the accident. Several illegal waste dumps around the airport attracted birds, airport management had failed to implement bird control procedures properly, and the existing guidance on the safety hazards of birds was insufficient. Regarding the accident sequence, the MAK found that after the bird strike and engine damage, the crew failed to apply proper procedures in relation to the engines' failure to produce sufficient thrust. The landing gear was kept extended, the engine thrust was not properly managed, the pitch was at too high of an angle, and the airspeed was not properly tracked. As a result, the aircraft did not have enough thrust to overcome drag, and it impacted the cornfield shortly after takeoff.

== Background ==
=== Aircraft ===
The aircraft involved, manufactured in 2004, was an Airbus A321-211 with registration VQ-BOZ. It was powered by two CFM International CFM56-5B engines. At the time of the accident, the aircraft had a total of 48,980 airframe hours and 20,132 flights.

=== Crew and passengers ===
Two pilots were in command of the flight. The captain and pilot-in-command was 41-year-old Damir Yusupov, who graduated from the Buguruslan Flight School of Civil Aviation, in Buguruslan, Russia, in 2013. He also received a degree in air navigation from the Ulyanovsk Institute of Civil Aviation in Ulyanovsk, Russia. Yusupov had 4,275 flight hours, 4,125 of which were on the Airbus A320 family, and 824 were as captain. He had a valid medical certificate, a valid air transport pilot certificate, and was not involved in any prior incidents.

The first officer and second-in-command was 23-year-old Georgy Murzin, who also graduated from the Buguruslan Flight School of Civil Aviation in 2017. Murzin had a total of 780 flight hours, 624 of which were on the Airbus A320 family. He also had valid medical and air transport pilot certificates and was not involved in any prior incidents.

In addition to the two flight crew members, five flight attendants were on board. 226 passengers were on the flight: 221 from Russia, 2 from Kazakhstan, 2 from Belarus and 1 from Ukraine.

== Accident ==
External videos
- Footage shortly after takeoff
- Footage during landing
- Aerial footage of landing area
- Footage of the landing site and plane shot by a passenger after landing

On 15 August 2019, VQ-BOZ was scheduled to fly for Ural Airlines as flight 178 from Zhukovsky International Airport in Moscow to Simferopol International Airport in Simferopol. The crew arrived at the aircraft one and a half hours before the planned departure time of 6:10 am. Yusupov spoke with the aircraft's previous flight crew, who told him that the aircraft was in working order. At 5:55, Yusupov and Murzin began their pre-flight briefing, which included a discussion on rejected takeoff and engine failure after V_{1}, but did not include remarks on the threat of birds. The crew also discussed how they would only address items on the electronic centralised aircraft monitor (ECAM) after climbing 400 ft (120 m) above ground level. At 6:05, air traffic control (ATC) gave the crew clearance to push back from their current position, which started one minute later. Both engines started during the push back, and the flaps extended to the configuration 1 (CONF1) position of 10°. ATC then gave the crew clearance to follow an escort vehicle to Runway 12. After being cleared to enter the runway at 6:11, Yusupov briefly mentioned a flock of birds that he saw, but continued to taxi into position for takeoff. One minute later, at 6:12:58, ATC cleared the flight for takeoff and cautioned them about "isolated bird activity." The V_{1} speed and V_{R} speed were 166 kn (307 km/h), and the V_{2} speed was 168 kn (311 km/h).

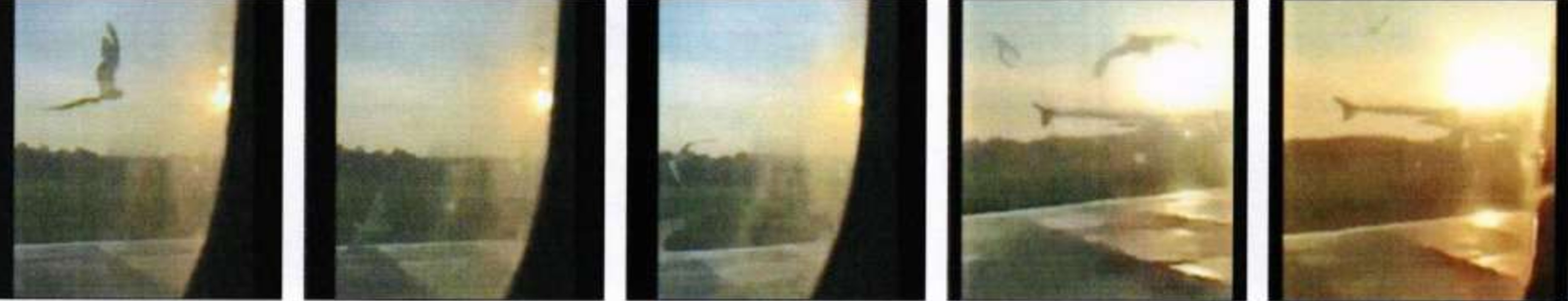
Stills from a passenger cell phone video showing the moment birds struck the plane

As the aircraft accelerated, the presence of birds alarmed Yusupov, and he called out, "Come on, fly past, bird, fuck," but continued with the takeoff. Murzin soon announced, "100 knots" as the plane passed that speed, and Yusupov replied, "Checked." As the aircraft continued accelerating down the runway, Murzin exclaimed "Fucking hell, fuck" in response to the birds. At 6:13:40, he then called out "V1, rotate." Yusupov moved his side-stick back to start rotation at an airspeed of 181 kn (335 km/h). As soon as the aircraft lifted off the runway, several gulls— 25 to 30 according to Yusupov's estimation— flew in front of the aircraft. The left engine subsequently ingested at least three birds, one large, and the right engine ingested at least one bird. The recorded vibrations on both engines increased to the maximum measurable value and stayed at it for the rest of the flight. The N1 fan rotation speed of the left engine decreased to near idle while the right engine's N1 reduced to a lesser extent. An erroneous "ENG 1 REVERSE UNLOCKED" warning appeared on the ECAM after a bird struck a sensor, causing the sensor to falsely indicate that the thrust reverser on the left engine was unlocked.

Four seconds after rotation, Murzin called out "Positive," referring to the positive rate of climb. However, he did not include "climb," the standard phrase that Yusupov was expecting, which would have alerted him to raise the landing gear. As a result, the landing gear stayed down for most of the flight, resulting in significantly more drag. Yusupov pitched the nose up to 12–13°, and the airspeed reached 183 kn (339 km/h) before decreasing. Due to the reduced thrust in the left engine, the aircraft started to yaw to the left. Initially, Yusupov did not use the rudder pedals to counteract this movement. When he started to deflect the rudder pedals to the right, he did not use the rudder trim. (Note: Rudder trim is a system that allows a pilot to bias out the yaw of the aircraft. Airbus guidelines dictate that a pilot needs to apply rudder trim to cancel out the effect of asymmetric thrust in an engine failure before engaging the autopilot.) Yusupov engaged the autopilot three seconds later at 6:13:59 as the aircraft was passing through 230 ft (70 m). The autopilot automatically reduced the pitch to 6° to reduce the ongoing decrease in airspeed. Immediately after the engagement, Yusupov announced, "ECAM action," despite being below the previously discussed altitude of 400 ft (120 m), the minimum altitude to respond to ECAM messages. Murzin, reading the ECAM, said, "Engine one reverse unlocked, thrust levers one idle, confirm thrust," calling for the left engine thrust lever to be moved to idle. As the altitude peaked at 315 ft (96 m) at 6:14:04, Yusupov responded with "check." Two seconds later, the autopilot disconnected, causing a red "AP OFF" warning to appear on the ECAM and a continuous aural alert to sound. (Note: The autopilot disconnected due to Yusupov's rudder pedal inputs going beyond what the forces were when the autopilot was engaged. The autopilot is designed to disengage if the rudder pedals are deflected more than 10° from the position they were in when it was engaged.) Both warnings remained on until the end of the flight. Murzin did not move the left thrust lever to idle when instructed to by Yusupov.

Soon after the autopilot disconnected, an enhanced ground proximity warning system (EGPWS) warning called out "don't sink" as the aircraft descended. In reaction, Yusupov pulled up on his side-stick, and the aircraft's pitch varied between 8.5° and 13° nose up. While this temporarily resulted in a reduction in descent rate, the airspeed continued to decrease. He then attempted to call ATC about their situation by transmitting, "Pan-pan, pan-pan, pan-pan, Sverdlovsk," but never finished his message. At the same time, his input on the rudder pedals lessened, the aircraft started to yaw back left, and drag increased. Both thrust levers were advanced to TOGA power at 6:14:20 while passing the 290 ft (90 m) mark. The left engine did not respond, but the right engine did; the N1 of the engine initially reached 96% before fluctuating between 78–96%. At the same time, several banging sounds came from the right engine, showing symptoms of a compressor stall. This issue reduced the thrust from the right engine, although it remained in the same condition for the rest of the flight. Nine seconds after the thrust levers were advanced into TOGA, Yusupov informed Murzin that the autopilot had disconnected and instructed him to watch the airspeed. Murzin did not reply, nor did he call out the decreasing airspeed. Yusupov then reported the emergency to ATC and transmitted, "Pan-pan, pan-pan, pan-pan, Sverdlovsk 178, one engine failure." He then ordered Murzin to request a return to the airport, which the controller granted, but the crew did not discuss how they would return and never attempted to do so.

At 6:14:47 and descending below 240 ft (70 m) with an airspeed of 152 kn (282 km/h), the left engine thrust lever was idled. The descent rate at this point was 400–600 ft/s (120–180 m/s). Murzin, warning Yusupov of the decreasing altitude, called out, "Altitude, altitude." Yusupov reacted by pulling up on his side-stick to a pitch of 12°. At this point, the Airbus A321's alpha protection system — designed to protect against high angles of attack (AOA) and aerodynamic stalls — was activated, preventing the AOA from increasing any further despite Yusupov's continued inputs. The EGPWS then issued a "terrain ahead, pull up" warning. Yusupov reacted by pulling his side-stick as far back as possible and did so for the rest of the flight. Descending below 120 ft (40 m) at 6:15:10, Yusupov, having just noticed the still-extended landing gear, raised it without communicating with Murzin in hopes of returning to the airport. Despite pulling his side-stick fully up, the alpha protection system kept the AOA at αMAX of 15.5° with a pitch of 13°. There was no preparation for or discussion between the crew about the imminent landing; no brace command was issued, the flaps were not extended beyond CONF1, and the engines were kept running.

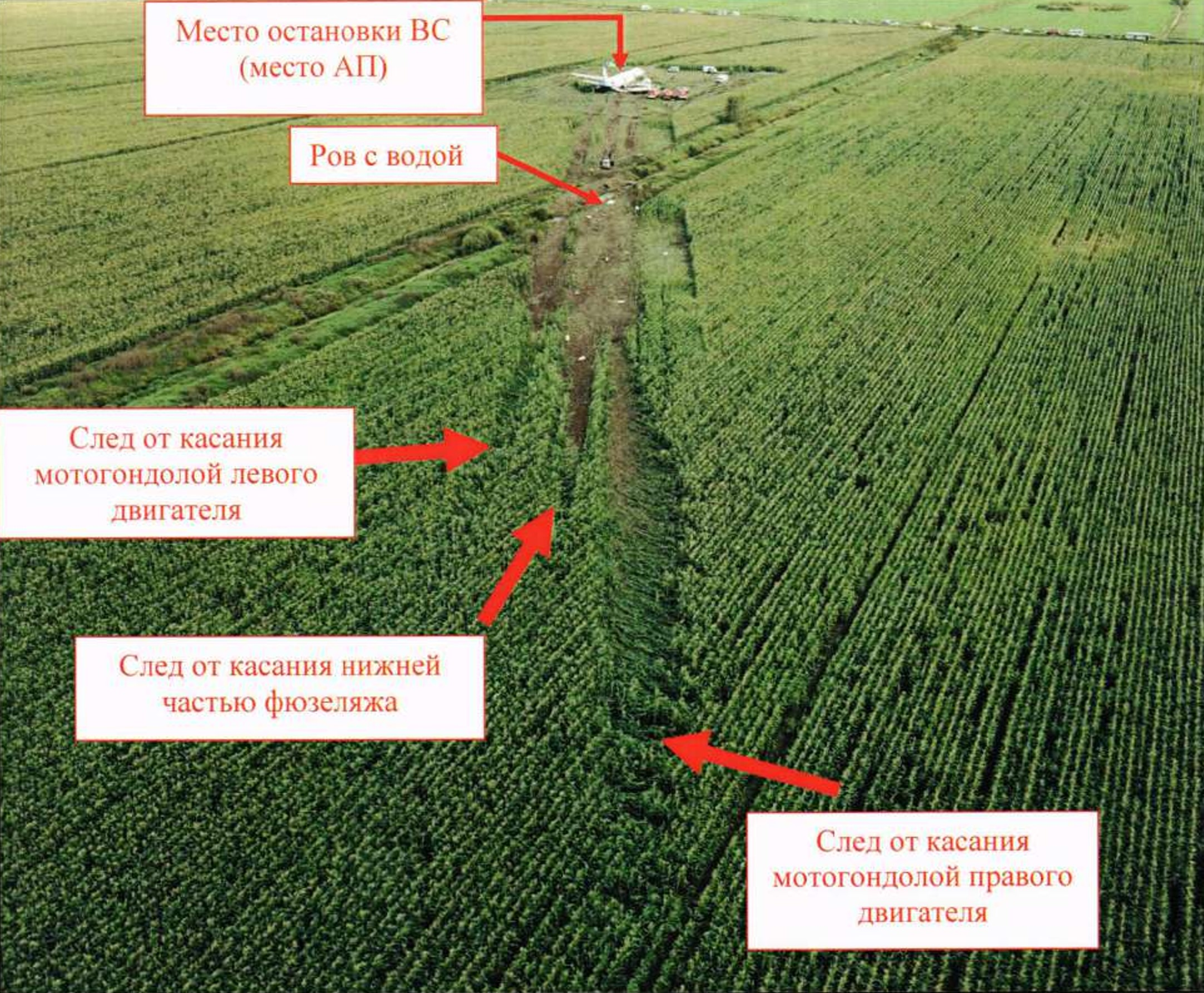
Overview of the accident site. Translations from top to bottom: aircraft resting point (accident site); watery ditch; left engine nacelle impact trace; lower fuselage impact trace; right engine nacelle impact trace.

The aircraft touched down in a cornfield at 6:15:17 at a speed of 135 kn (250 km/h), 16,240 ft (4,950 m) from the end of Runway 12 and to the left of its centerline. The right engine nacelle first made contact with the ground, followed shortly by the lower fuselage and left engine nacelle. The aircraft slid across the ground, bending corn stalks due to the thrust from the right engine. After travelling over a watery ditch, it stopped 17,400 ft (5,300 m) from the end of Runway 12 with no post-crash fire.

After the aircraft came to a stop, the crew reported the accident to ATC. The flight attendants immediately started the evacuation by opening the emergency exits and deploying all eight evacuation slides. They instructed passengers by loudspeaker to leave their hand luggage on the plane. All passengers and crew were successfully evacuated. Within several minutes of the accident, various rescue services from Zhukovsky Airport and other Moscow-based emergency services arrived at the site to transport the passengers and crew back to the airport on buses.

All 233 passengers and crew survived the accident. Seventy-eight passengers, including nineteen children, received medical attention after the accident. Thirty-two passengers, including ten children, were taken to Ramenskoe Central Municipal Hospital and Zhukovskiy City Clinical Hospital. Thirty of them were treated and released, while two adults were hospitalized. In total, twenty-eight people sustained injuries; twenty-five minor injuries and three serious injuries, including First Officer Murzin, who fractured a vertebra. Four passengers were injured in the evacuation, while all the other injuries occurred during the impact.

== Reactions ==
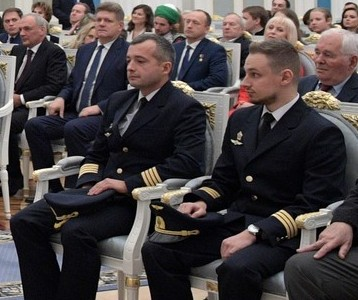
Damir Yusupov (left) and Georgy Murzin (right) at the awards ceremony in the Kremlin, 21 November 2019

Shortly after the accident, Ural Airlines released a statement on Twitter stating: "Flight U6178 Zhukovsky-Simferopol on departure from Zhukovsky sustained multiple bird strikes to the aircraft engines. The aircraft made an emergency landing. There were no injuries to the passengers and crew." The airline praised the professionalism of the pilots.

On social media, immediate comparisons were made between the accident and US Airways Flight 1549, which ditched on the Hudson River after it struck a flock of birds and suffered a dual engine failure. It was dubbed by Russian media and citizens as the "Miracle in the Cornfield," paralleling the "Miracle on the Hudson" in the United States. The day after the accident, Russian president Vladimir Putin announced that Captain Yusupov and First Officer Murzin had been awarded the Hero of the Russian Federation, Russia's highest civilian honor, for "courage and heroism shown in the performance of official duty in extreme conditions." All flight attendants were awarded the Order of Courage for "courage and selflessness shown in the performance of official duty in extreme conditions."

== Investigation ==
The Interstate Aviation Committee (Russian: Межгосударственный авиационный комитет, MAK) investigated the accident. The Bureau of Enquiry and Analysis for Civil Aviation Safety (BEA), representing the country where the aircraft was manufactured (France), and the Air Accidents Investigation Branch (AAIB), representing the state of registration (Bermuda), assisted in the investigation. The MAK decoded and analyzed both flight recorders of the aircraft.

=== Flight crew actions ===
The MAK analyzed the actions made by the crew during the flight based on interviews and the flight recorders. The MAK found that the crew did not apply proper procedures for engine damage or failure during the flight. At no point did the crew determine the remaining thrust the engines were producing, nor did they evaluate the damage sustained to the engines. They also did not raise the landing gear after takeoff, a required part of standard operating procedures (SOPs) relating to engine failure after V_{1}. The cockpit voice recorder (CVR) showed that Murzin did not properly call out "Positive climb," which resulted in Yusupov's failure to raise the gear. In later interviews Yusupov gave to the MAK, he said he never heard Murzin call out "Climb." The MAK attributed the breakdown in communication to increasing levels of emotional stress. The flight data recorder (FDR) showed that instead of following the flight directors, Yusupov pitched the aircraft's nose up to 12.5°, which was the flight crew training manual's (FCTM) recommended pitch angle after takeoff in the event of an engine failure. However, the FCTM only provides this figure for immediate use after rotation, not for continued climb. The MAK deemed that Yusupov continuing to pitch the nose up to the angle listed in the FCTM demonstrated that he was losing situational awareness.

The investigation determined that Yusupov's increased levels of emotional stress and loss of situational awareness led to his autopilot engagement without using rudder trim to trim out the manual inputs he was making on the rudder pedals. In interviews with the MAK, Yusupov stated that he called out "ECAM action" despite being below 400 ft (120 m) because he thought that the reverser on the left engine might have deployed and believed it to be a critical warning needing to be addressed. He evaluated that the actions for engine failure after V_{1} were complete, and he could focus his attention on the ECAM. However, the MAK deemed that his assessment of the situation was incorrect. The aircraft was not on a stable climb path, the airspeed was below V_{2} (the recommended airspeed after an engine failure) and falling, and the flight director commands were not followed. After the disconnection of the autopilot, the flight recorders indicated that there was no discussion between the crew about the disconnection, no attempts to re-engage autopilot, and no silencing of the aural disconnect warning. The MAK determined that Yusupov likely never comprehended the warning due to his emotional stress. When the EGPWS activated, Yusupov pulled fully up on his side-stick and advanced the thrust levers to TOGA power. The damaged right engine started to suffer a compressor stall as a result, but the flight recorders revealed that neither crew member discussed the state of the engines or applied the correct procedure to stop the stalling from occurring.

Rather than addressing the unsafe flight path the aircraft was currently on, Yusupov attempted to call ATC about their emergency. The MAK deemed this action to violate crew resource management principles, which stated that the non-flying pilot, First Officer Murzin, should make radio calls when no ECAM actions are being taken. The MAK also deemed that Yusupov's communication was not in lines with aviate, navigate, communicate, which dictates that crews should focus on safely flying their airplane before communicating with ATC. The aircraft was not on a safe flight profile when he made his radio transmission. The MAK concluded that throughout the entire flight, Murzin was confused, failed to call out the airspeed when instructed, and failed to fulfill the duties of pilot monitoring. His stressed condition resulted in a startle effect and an inability to perceive the situation properly. The FDR recorded that he made small inputs on his side-stick at the same time as Yusupov did, although not with sufficient force to trigger a dual input warning. The MAK determined that Yusupov also failed to perceive the situation fully; he experienced tunnel vision and failed to maintain the necessary rudder pedal inputs needed to keep the aircraft flying straight without any sideslip. In interviews given to the MAK, Yusupov said he retracted the landing gear just before impact in order to prevent the aircraft from digging into the wet soil or cartwheeling on touchdown. Murzin stated that there was a discussion between him and Yusupov and that they agreed to raise it. However, there was no recording of a discussion on the CVR, and it showed that Yusupov raised the landing gear without informing Murzin.

In addition to analyzing the crew's actions, the MAK carried out psychological testing to determine their personalities. Yusupov showed results for having reactionary behavior, being excitable and impulsive, a tendency towards dominance, difficulty following authority, and denying negative information presented to him. The MAK determined that in high-stress and abnormal situations, his personality could have resulted in latent reactions where his behavior becomes disorganized, chaotic, and inconsistent in high-stress and abnormal situations. Murzin showed similar results to Yusupov, with the addition of being immature and competitive. Like Yusupov, the MAK determined that his personality could have led to procedure violations and disorganized actions.

The MAK concluded, "From the very beginning of the event, the actions of the crew, especially the captain, were characterized by disorganization, inconsistency, and chaos, indicating partial psychological incapacitation." The investigators deemed that the crew failed to carry out the procedures for engine failure after V_{1} properly. In particular, the investigators highlighted that the crew did not raise the landing gear, follow the flight directors, or trim the rudder out before engaging the autopilot. The MAK noted that the crew suffered from several psychological effects in the abnormal situation they were experiencing, including the startle effect and psychological incapacitation. Additionally, the MAK found that both crew members had accumulated many unused rest days, with Murzin having not taken a break for the 10 months prior to the accident. The lack of sufficient breaks might have resulted in the crew's chronic fatigue.

=== Aircraft performance ===
Despite initial reports that both engines had failed, the MAK found that both engines continued to operate after the bird strike. The two engines ingested either European herring gulls or Caspian gulls, with the left engine having ingested at least three birds and the right engine having ingested at least one bird. One of the birds ingested into the left engine was considered large, weighing above 2.5 lb (1.1 kg). The CFM56-5B engines were certified by the European Aviation Safety Agency (EASA) to be able to withstand the ingestion of one large bird, and not start a fire, fail in an uncontained manner, exceed aircraft structural loads, or result in an inability for the crew to shut it down. The left engine met the certification during the accident; it continued to operate at a lower thrust level after the ingestion of birds, it did not suffer any fire, uncontained engine failure, or high structural loads, and it was shut down after the forced landing as commanded. EASA also dictated that after the ingestion of a medium-sized bird, 1.5 lb (0.7 kg), the thrust should not decrease by more than 25%. Before the right engine — which ingested a medium-sized bird — was advanced into TOGA power, it only lost 20% of its thrust, meeting the certification.

The MAK conducted a simulation to determine whether the flight could have continued with the near-total loss of thrust on the left engine and 20% loss of thrust on the right engine. It was determined that with the landing gear extended, which was the configuration on the accident flight, the available thrust did not result in a positive climb gradient, and it was impossible to maintain altitude without losing airspeed. With the landing gear retracted, the thrust resulted in a positive climb gradient and the aircraft was able to climb with a gradient of 1.65%, although below the minimum required gradient of 2.4%. Despite the possibility of a safe climb after the bird strike if the crew retracted the landing gear, the MAK noted that a safe outcome was not guaranteed as the thrust from the damaged engines could have changed at any point during flight and leave insufficient thrust to return to the airport.

=== Proliferation of birds near airport ===
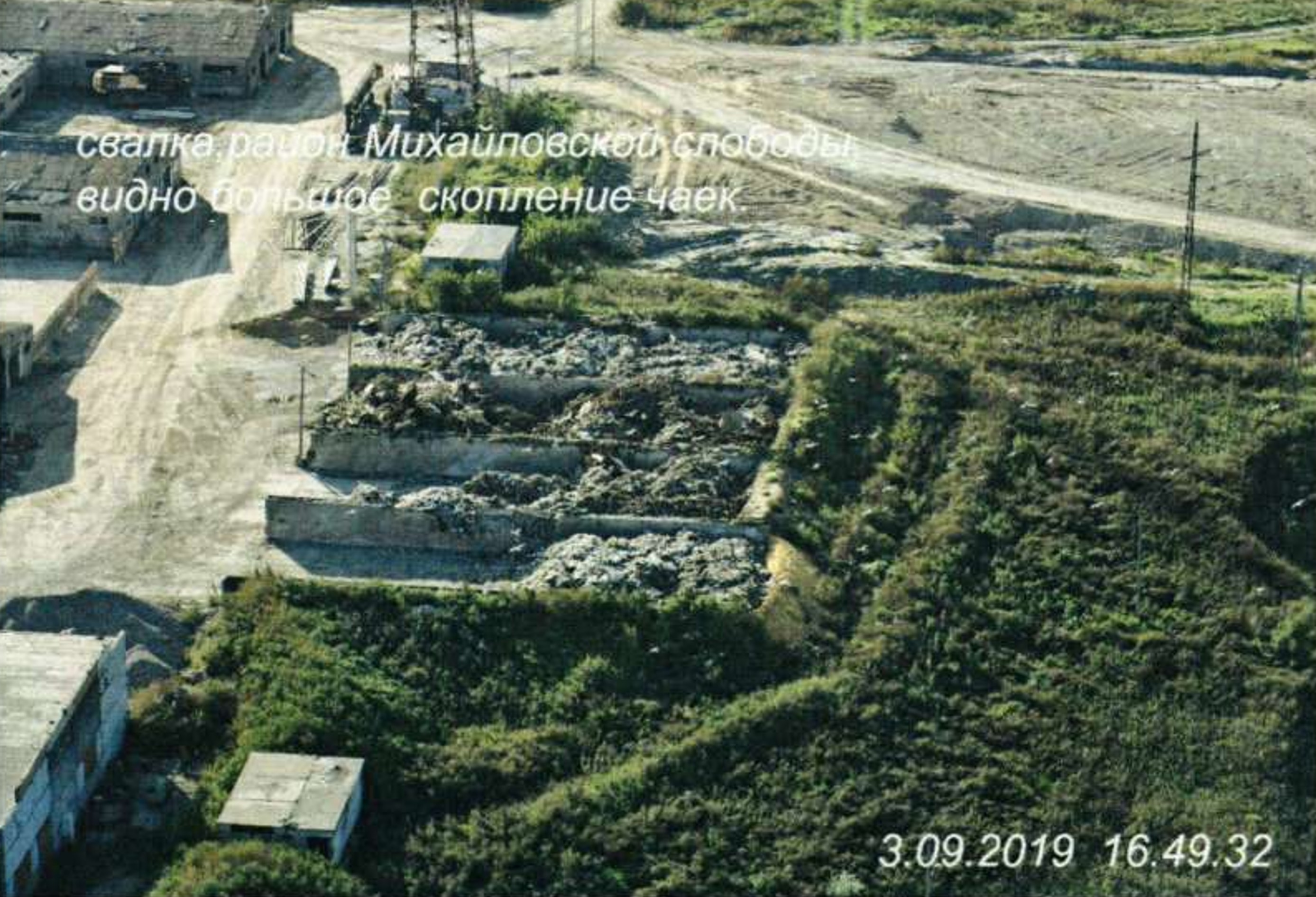
The Mikhailovskaya Sloboda Neighborhood Dump was one of several illegal waste dump sites the MAK identified as attracting birds. At the time this photograph was taken, several gulls were on the dump.

Illegal waste dumps around Zhukovsky Airport have attracted birds in the past. The M. M. Gromov Flight Institute, which operated at the airport, had repeatedly written to city authorities in Zhukovsky and Ramenskoe about the presence of the waste dumps and the birds they were attracting. In 2012, a local organization sued the management of one of the waste sites, based on regulations demanding that such dump sites not be within 10 mi (15 km) of the airport. Still, the Ministry of Ecology of Moscow Oblast denied the presence of illegal landfills in the area. The flight institute continued to contact city authorities, with the last request to remove the dumps before the accident being sent to Zhukovsky's authorities in May 2019, with no reply. An illegal waste dump at Lake Glushitsa, less than 1 mi (2 km), from the airport and a dump in the Mikhailovskaya Sloboda neighborhood both were known bird gathering spots. The MAK concluded that the birds resting places and feeding sites were on the opposite side of the runway at Zhukovsky Airport. When the birds were to fly between the two locations, they crossed over the runway and threatened aircraft safety.

As Zhukovsky Airport management could not remove the birds, they implemented several bird control measures to reduce the threat. The airport director told the MAK that he had conducted a runway inspection between 5:30 and 5:50 on the day of the accident and that he had not noticed any birds. However, the area where he stated inspection was conducted was the same area where the crew noticed birds while they were taxiing and where a bird struck the plane. This and pre-existing deviations from procedure made the MAK unable to confirm whether a runway inspection was actually conducted. In addition to runway inspections, the airport had also implemented bioacoustical devices and a propane cannon to repel birds using sound. According to guidelines from the International Civil Aviation Organization (ICAO), audio devices designed to repel birds are most effective and should only be activated when a flock of birds is nearby. At Zhukovsky Airport, however, the bioacoustical devices and the propane cannon operated regularly throughout the day and night. This rendered the devices ineffective at repelling the birds as the birds around the airport became used to the sounds they produced.

At Ural Airlines, the flight operation manual (FOM) stated that pre-flight preparation must include discussions on ornithological risks to the flight relevant to the departure airport. However, the only airport the FOM mentioned with such risks was Sochi. Russian aviation regulations did not contain any provisions regarding the monitoring of bird strike risks during flight. SOPs did not specify when it was appropriate for crews to take further action — such as requesting a runway inspection — when birds were spotted near the airport. Due to the continual presence of birds, ATC at Zhukovsky Airport frequently warned flight crews of the threat. One Zhukovsky air traffic controller reported, "We issue warnings to every departing aircraft. The birds come to sit on the runway — there's the river and the dump nearby, so they're here constantly." The MAK found that controllers often gave messages relating to birds out of habit and did not always reflect the true presence of birds. The constant transmissions led crews at Zhukovsky to become accustomed to it, failing to treat it as anything more than background noise.

The MAK concluded that the presence of birds at Zhukovsky Airport, which resulted from the large number of sites that attracted birds, insufficient bird control measures, and obsolete regulations, created safety risks that were causal factors in the accident.

=== Final report ===
Under the conventions of ICAO Annex 13, the final report of any aviation accident or incident must be released as soon as possible, and interim statements on the progress of the investigation must be issued every anniversary of the accident. However, until November 2025, the last update the MAK posted on their website regarding the investigation was an interim statement from August 2020. Instead of the MAK publishing the report on their website, in August 2022, anonymous users posted a copy of the final report sent to Rosaviatsiya on several Telegram channels earlier that month. In an article by Meduza about the accident and the findings of the report, an aviation journalist said that the final report was not published on the MAK website due to "bureaucratic reasons" and "the inability to get it approved 'at a higher level.'" Meduza highlighted how the final reports for Saratov Airlines Flight 703 and UTair Flight 579 were released on the MAK website in a timely manner. In November 2025, the MAK officially published the final report.

In the final report, the MAK concluded:

The aircraft accident involving A321-211 VQ-BOZ occurred during takeoff in daylight hours (06:15 local time) and under visual meteorological conditions as a result of a collision immediately after liftoff with a flock of gulls with masses greater than 1.13 kg (2.5 lbs), considered to fall within the "large bird" certification category, which caused mechanical damage to both engines, a decrease in total available thrust below the thrust of one engine in FLEX 49 (the regime under which takeoff was conducted), an inability to continue the flight with the existing aircraft configuration (gear in the extended position), and a forced landing outside the airport. Considering the available engine thrust, the situation that developed during the flight fell outside the expected operating conditions envisioned during certification of the aircraft type. Based on the damage to the engines, maintenance of even this thrust level during continued flight would not have been guaranteed.

As contributing factors, the MAK listed: improper bird control regulations in Russia; the existence of locations attractive to birds around Zhukovsky Airport; deficiencies in bird control at Zhukovsky Airport; lack of rules regarding the actions crews take in encounters with birds; and the psychological pressure and stress the crew experienced during takeoff, which failed to carry out engine failure procedures. Among the safety recommendations the MAK issued included stricter guidelines on bird control in airports throughout Russia, calls to remove illegal waste dumps around Zhukovsky Airport, and increased guidance on bird strikes and engine failure after V_{1}. The MAK additionally recommended to various aviation authorities to review the possibility of a rejected takeoff after V_{1} if the aircraft is "just unable to fly". The BEA in their comments on the report did not support this recommendation, noting how the aircraft was still able to fly after the bird strikes that were well past V_{1} speed. They additionally commented on how the aviation industry as a whole has focused on how rejected takeoffs past V_{1} is an action that must not be executed due to the risk of runway excursions.

== Aftermath ==
The aircraft was written off in the accident and deemed as a hull loss by Ural Airlines. The airline announced that it would be scrapped in the field and did not plan to reuse parts of it. The MAK subsequently moved pieces of the aircraft to the airport as part of the investigation. Ural Airlines offered 100,000 ₽ (US$1,358) in compensation to the passengers of the flight.

During the investigation, several safety actions were acted on. The M. M. Gromov Flight Institute expanded their bird control program at Zhukovsky Airport, acquiring more bird control devices, increasing their staff member count, and carrying out regular exercises related to bird control. Ural Airlines updated risk levels at its airports to reflect the available information about potential hazards. Additionally, they gave supporting information to flight crews regarding the status of birds at airports they operated at.

An ecological-ornithological inspection was carried out around the airport. In September 2019, Rosaviatsiya proposed to work with law enforcement authorities to check the legality of waste dumps near airports, and to examine the frequency of scheduled and unscheduled inspections of airports for the presence of birds. In 2021, Rosaviatsiya and the A. N. Severtsov Institute for Ecological Problems and Evolution of the Russian Academy of Sciences made proposals to minimize bird strikes and a joint effort was established to aggregate bird strike data. Rosaviatsiya recommended that airport operators send biological data from bird strike incidents to the A.N. Severtsov Institute for examination.

=== In popular culture ===
Soon after the accident, the phrase, "Let's go to the right, in the sun, along the rows of corn" (Russian: Идем правее, на солнце, вдоль рядов кукурузы, romanized: Idem praveye, na solntse, vdol' ryadov kukuruzy) became popular on Russian social media after Dmitry Ivlitsky, the senior flight attendant, was heard saying it during the evacuation. Ural Airlines announced it was printing and selling limited-edition T-shirts containing the phrase. In March 2023, a film of the same name about the accident was released with Sarik Andreasyan as director.

== See also ==
- Ural Airlines Flight 1383 – An Ural Airlines Airbus A320 that landed in a wheat field after suffering a fuel emergency

== Works cited ==
- Окончательный отчёт по результатам расследования аварии самолёта А321-211 VQ-BOZ [Final report on the results of the investigation into the crash of the A321-211 VQ-BOZ aircraft] (PDF) (Report) (in Russian). Interstate Aviation Committee. 12 April 2022., official release
- Окончательный отчёт по результатам расследования аварии самолёта А321-211 VQ-BOZ [Final report on the results of the investigation into the crash of the A321-211 VQ-BOZ aircraft] (PDF) (Report) (in Russian). Interstate Aviation Committee. 12 April 2022 – via the Internet Archive., leaked report
- Final report on the results of the investigation into the crash of the A321-211 VQ-BOZ aircraft (PDF) (Report). Translated by Dempsey, Kyra. Interstate Aviation Committee. 12 April 2022 – via the Internet Archive., unofficial English translation
