= Konstantin Kryukov =

Russian actor

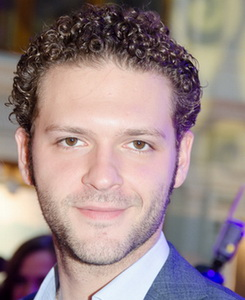
- Kryukov in 2013
- Born: Konstantin Vitalyevich Kryukov; 7 February 1985 (age 41); Moscow, Russian SFSR, Soviet Union
- Occupations: Actor, jeweler, artist
- Years active: 2005 — present

Konstantin Vitalyevich Kryukov (Russian: Константин Витальевич Крюков; born 7 February 1985) is a Russian actor. He is known for playing the role of Dzhokonda in The 9th Company.

Konstantin Kryukov was born on 7 February 1985 in Moscow in the family of the actress Yelena Bondarchuk and doctor of philosophy Vitaly Kryukov. He is the grandson of legendary Soviet director and actor Sergei Bondarchuk and actress Irina Skobtseva, nephew of Fyodor and Natalya Bondarchuk.

In 2001, he graduated from the Gemological Institute of America and received a diploma as a gemologist of the highest qualification. In 2009, together with the British company The Saplings, he released his first jewelry collection entitled “Choice”.

== Filmography ==
- 2005 The 9th Company as Private Ruslan Petrovskyy (Dzhokonda)
- 2006 Heat as Kostya
- 2006 Love as love as Michael Prorva
- 2006 Three polugratsii as Pavel Arsenevich Gushchin, an aspiring writer
- 2007 Kilometer Zero as Arthur
- 2009 Soldiers (TV series) as Andrey Landyshev
- 2010 Odnoklass as Fedya
- 2011 On hook! as Alexander Vlasov
- 2012 Happy New Year, Mom! as Yaroslav
- 2013 What are men doing! as Yarik
- 2013 Sex Competition as Yaroslav
- 2013 Studio 17 (TV series) as Maksim (1 episode)
- 2013 While still alive as Roma
- 2014 Champions as Anton Sikharulidze
- 2014 Spiral as Stas
