= Sex Competition =

2013 film by Sarik Andreasyan

- Directed by: Sarik Andreasyan
- Produced by: Georgy Malkov; Sarik Andreasyan; Ghevond Andreasyan
- Starring: Tair Mamedov; Roman Yunusov; Konstantin Kryukov
- Cinematography: Anton Zenkovich
- Music by: Darin Sysoev; Garik Papoyan
- Release date: 28 February 2013
- Running time: 86 min
- Country: Russia
- Language: Russian

Sex Competition (Russian: Что творят мужчины!, romanized: Chto tvoryat muzhchiny!, transl. What Men Do!) is a 2013 Russian comedy film directed by Sarik Andreasyan. The film became the leader of the Russian box-office on the basis of the weekend of February 28 — March 3.

== Plot ==
An extravagant millionaire invites four young men to participate in a sex tournament - a game with a prize of half a million dollars. The goal is to seduce as many women as possible in 5 days of stay at the seaside resort. But the targets are not easy – grandmother, wife of an oligarch, virgin, feminist and sectarian. But unexpectedly love starts to interfere with the game of sex.

== Cast ==
- Tair Mamedov as Deni
- Roman Yunusov as Gosha
- Konstantin Kryukov as Yarosla
- Gavriil Gordeev as Arkady
- Ravshana Kurkova as Alisa
- Anna Khilkevich as Tatyana
- Kristina Asmus as Sveta
- Natalia Medvedeva as Rita
- Ekaterina Skulkina as prostitute
