= Anna Sedokova =

Ukrainian singer (born 1982)

- А́нна Сєдоко́ва
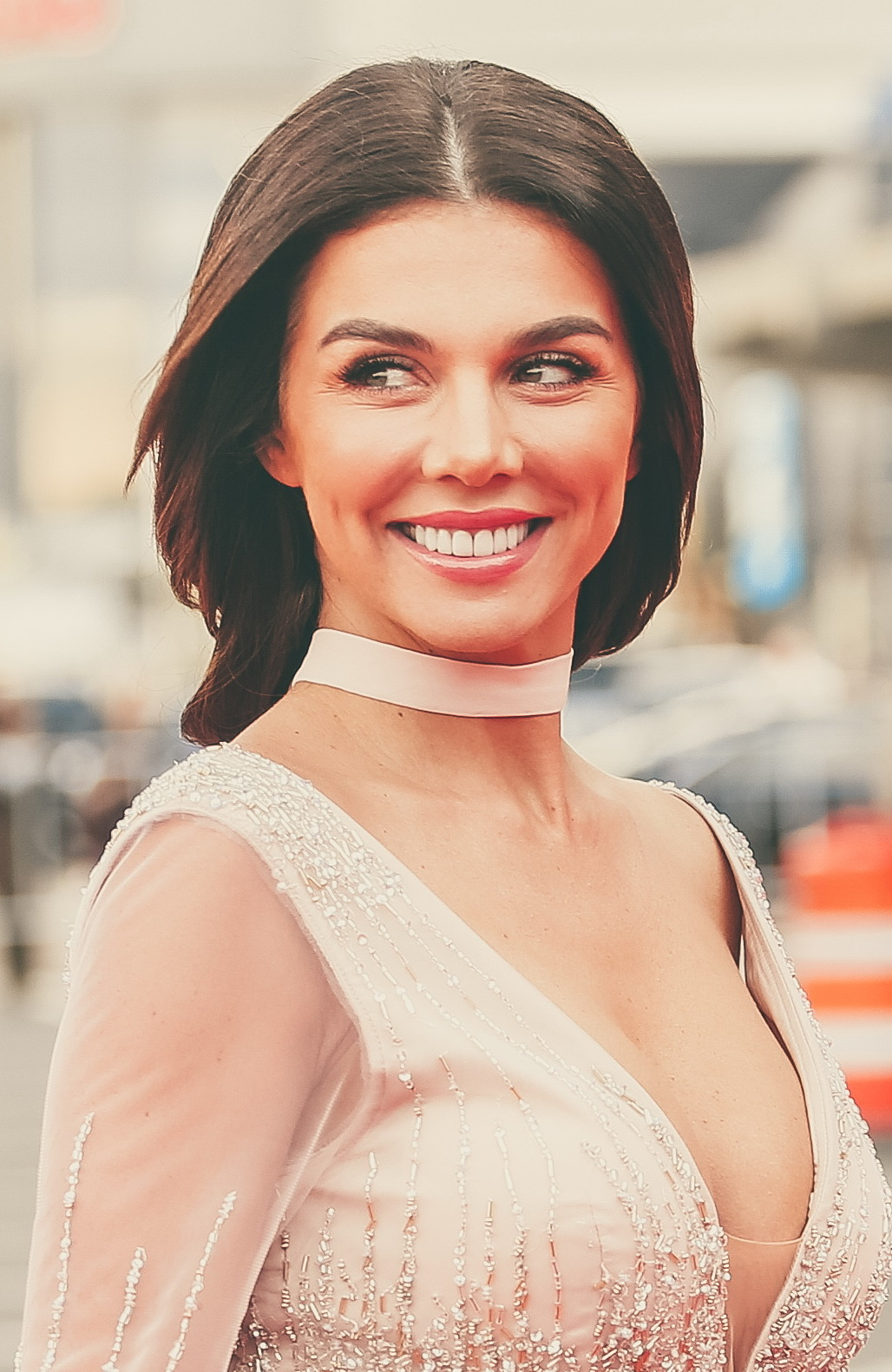
- Sedokova in 2016
- Born: 16 December 1982 (age 43); Kyiv, Ukrainian SSR, Soviet Union
- Occupations: Singer; actress; TV presenter
- Years active: 2001–present
- Spouses: Valyantsin Byalkevich (m. 2004; div. 2006) Maxim Chernyavsky (m. 2011; div. 2013) Jānis Timma (m. 2020; div. 2024)
- Partner: Artyom Komarov (2016–2017)
- Children: 3
- Musical career
- Genre: Pop
- Instrument: Vocals
- Labels: Monolit; Media Land
- Formerly of: Nu Virgos
- Website: annasedokova.com

Anna Volodymyrivna Sedokova (Note: Ukrainian: А́нна Володи́мирівна Сєдоко́ва, romanized: Anna Volodymyrivna Siedokova; Russian: А́нна Влади́мировна Седоко́ва, romanized: Anna Vladimirovna Sedokova) (born 16 December 1982) is a Ukrainian singer, actress, and television presenter. She rose to prominence in 2002 as a member of the Ukrainian pop girl group Nu Virgos—known as "VIA Gra" in both Ukraine and the Commonwealth of Independent States—in which she was nicknamed Anya (Аня). Following two years in the "golden line-up" of the group, she began pursuing a solo music career in 2006. Sedokova released a string of singles until her debut album Lichnoe (2016) was met with widespread commercial success, peaking at number two in Russia.

Alongside her musical career, she achieved popular recognition as an actress and television presenter in various Ukrainian and Russian productions.

== Early life and education ==
Sedokova was born in 1982 in Kiev (now Kyiv), Ukraine, then part of the Soviet Union. Her parents, who had moved from Tomsk, divorced when she was young. As a child, she developed an interest in music and dance, and eventually enrolled in the Kyiv National University of Culture and Arts when she was 17. She continued her studies while also hosting television shows.

== Career ==
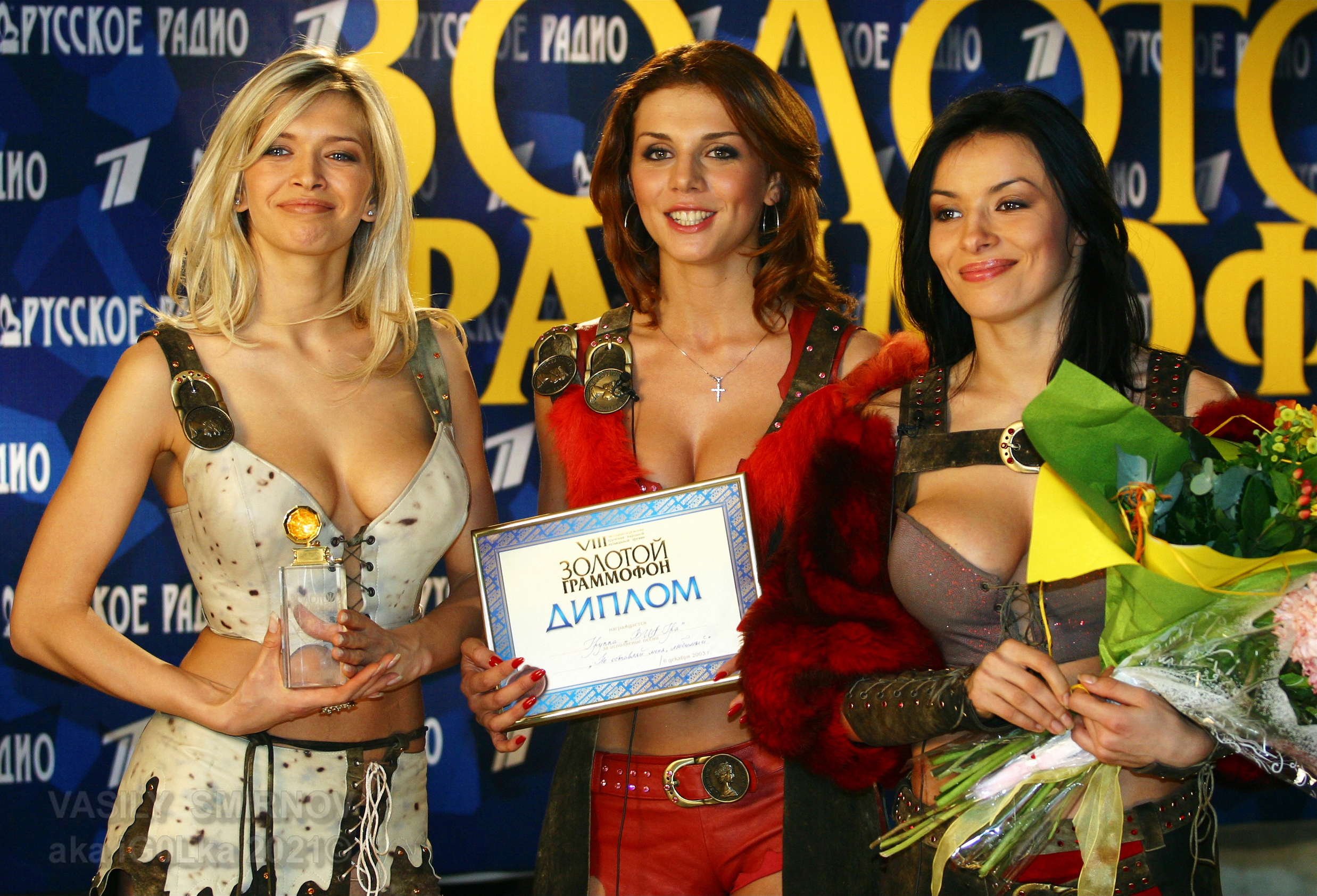
Sedokova with the fellow Nu Virgos members Vera Brezhneva (left) and Nadezhda Granovskaya (right) in 2003

Her first TV project was work as a news anchor for the music TV channel, OTV. By the age of 18 she had worked in three TV programs: NEWS BLOK, Fashionable Life, and The Big Sunday News Digest. In 2001 she passed an audition for the morning show Podjem (“Waking up”), which had the highest ratings in the country, on Novyi Kanal (New Channel). Between 2002 and 2004 she was a member of the Nu Virgos pop group.

She appeared in a movie titled Cinderella and another based on a Gogol's book, which was called The Evenings on the Homestead. Her 2006 role in The Tunguska Meteorite was a turning-point and in 2008 she acted in The Power of Attraction.

Sedokova also started a solo-singer career. Her first video for the song "My Heart" reached the top of the charts and gained her an Audience Appreciation Award at the 5 STARS Sotchi Music Festival. Afterwards, she did a video for her song "The Very Best Girl" and "I Am Getting Used". Both videos were huge hits in Russia and Ukraine. But TV wouldn't let Sedokova go. TVStar Superstar, the most expensive show in the country's history, aired on Ukraine in 2008. Every Sunday Sedokova was in the live broadcast of a 3-hour show with 400 participants.

In 2009, Sedokova was named the best TV Host of the country by Elle. Sedokova's TV career developed - she became one of the faces of Channel One, the biggest Russian-speaking channel in the world. She also became a host of the show King of the Ring. Sedokova hosted The New Songs About the Most Essential Thing - a big live concert in which the best 50 performers of the country participated. She also took part in Two Stars and Ice Age shows and entertained the public with a well received creative performance. These projects attracted tens of millions of viewers and became the highest rated shows on Russian TV.

In 2011, Sedokova was the host of Project Runway Russia. Also in 2011, The Pregnant, with Sedokova as lead actress, was a great success. Sedokova's first book The Art of Seduction is still a best-seller in Russia. The theme of this book should be of no surprise to her audience – for several years in a row Sedokova remains the recipient of "Sexiest Female Award" as well as "Most beloved star" award (given to a star popular with all generations and both genders). She was also named "The Most Desirable Female Performer" in Russia.

== Personal life ==
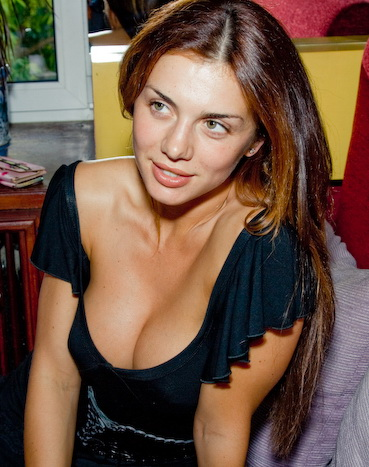
Sedokova in 2008

Sedokova married Belarusian footballer Valyantsin Byalkevich in 2004. A few months after their marriage, their daughter Alina was born on 8 December. The couple divorced in 2006, because of his cheating. Sedokova was married to businessman Maxim Chernyavsky from February 2011 to February 2013; the two had one daughter, Monika. In May 2017, reports emerged that Sedokova would marry Artyom Komarov (Russian: Артём Комаров), a Russian businessman and the father of her third child, a son Hector. In August 2017, Sedokova announced that she had ended her relationship with Komarov. In September 2020, she married for the third time, to Latvian professional basketball player Jānis Timma. In late 2024, Sedokova filed for a divorce from Timma. On 16 December, Timma was found dead following a suspected suicide on the occasion of Sedokova's 42nd birthday.

In December 2010, Sedokova came out as bisexual during an online conference with the readers of the Ukrainian portal tochka.net. She later confirmed it in an interview with Novyi Kanal, describing her sexual experiences with her female lovers as "wonderful".

In 2013, she criticized the so-called "gay propaganda" law adopted by the State Duma of the Russian Federation. In an interview with the radio station Echo of Moscow, the singer expressed bewilderment at the vague wording of the law, asking the question "what is propaganda?" Sedokova stated that the authors and supporters of the law "have no right to tell someone else whom to love and what to do".

In 2020, Sedokova backed Kazakh singer Dequine, who spoke out against sexual harassment, in which she shared her own teenage experience and called for women to unite against such behavior. She also criticized misogyny in Russian music and sexism on television.

== Controversy ==
In 2014, Sedokova's acceptance of awards in Russia was met with criticism in Ukraine, owing to the recent outbreak of the Russo-Ukrainian War at that time.

In October 2022, amid the Russian invasion of Ukraine, Sedokova was subjected to Ukrainian sanctions by the National Security and Defense Council of Ukraine, along with other Ukrainian singers Taisia Povaliy and Ani Lorak, in addition to TV presenter Regina Todorenko. Sedokova never publicly spoke out against the invasion.

== Discography ==
Anna Sedokova discography
- Studio albums: 1
- Singles: 21

=== Studio albums ===
List of studio albums, with selected chart positions
Title	Album details	Peak charts positions
Title	Album details	RUS
Lichnoe (Личное)	Released: 1 March 2016; Label: Self-released; Format: digital download; Track listing: 1. "Den' pervyy bez tebya" ("День первый без тебя"); 2. "O tebe" ("О тебе"); 3. "Den' vtoroy bez tebya" ("День второй без тебя"); 4. "Ya cnova tebe poveryu" ("Я снова тебе поверю"); 5. "Den' tretyy bez tebya" ("День третий без тебя"); 6. "Serdtse v bintakh" ("Сердце в бинтах"; unplugged version); 7. "Den' chetvyortyy bez tebya" ("День четвёртый без тебя"); 8. "Ne skromnichay" ("Не скромничай"); 9. "Den' pyatyy bez tebya" ("День пятый без тебя"); 10. "O tebe" ("О тебе"; instrumental version)	2

=== Singles ===
==== As lead artist ====
List of singles as lead artist, with selected chart positions, showing year released and album name
Title	Year	Peak chart positions			Album
Title	Year	CIS countries	UKR (Note: Peak positions for the Tophit weekly national charts in Ukraine and Russia refer to the following songs: "Privykayu", "Kholodnoe serdtse", "Drama", "Love U", "Taxi", "Chto ya nadelala", "Samyy luchshiy", "Mezhdu nami", "Dotron'sya", "O tebe" and "Ya budu".)	RUS	Album
"Moyo serdtse" ("Моё сердце")	2006	—	—	—	Non-album singles
"Samaya luchshaya devochka" ("Самая лучшая девочка")	2007	—	—	—	Non-album singles
"Privykayu" ("Привыкаю")	2008	13	61	1371	Non-album singles
"Mesyats may" ("Месяц май")	2009	—	—	—	Non-album singles
"Tango" ("Танго")	2009	—	—	—	Non-album singles
"Drama" ("Драма")	2009	123	512	1122	Non-album singles
"Love U"	2011	174	84	443	Non-album singles
"Taxi" ("Такси")	2012	225	732	766	Non-album singles
"Chto ya nadelala" ("Что я наделала")	2012	167	37	420	Non-album singles
"Nebezolasno" ("Небезопасно") (with Misha Krupin)	2013	—	—	—	Non-album singles
"Udali" ("Удали")	2013	—	—	—	Non-album singles
"Samyy luchshiy" ("Самый лучший")	2013	158	47	1266	Non-album singles
"Mezhdu nami" ("Между нами") (featuring Sender)	2013	158	95	538	Non-album singles
"Serdtse v bintakh" ("Сердце в бинтах")	2013	—	—	—	Lichnoe
"Dotron'sya" ("Дотронься")	2014	168	70	808	Non-album singles
"Piranyi" ("Пираньи")	2014	—	—	—	Non-album singles
"Tishe" ("Тише") (with Monatik)	2015	—	—	—	Zvuchit (Monatik album)
"Poka, milyy" ("Пока, милый")	2015	—	—	—	Non-album single
"O tebe" ("О тебе")	2016	195	446	1529	Lichnoe
"Ya budu" ("Я буду")	2016	155	645	318	Non-album single
"—" denotes items which were not released in that country or failed to chart.

==== As a featured artist ====
List of singles as a featured artist, with selected chart positions, showing year released and album name
Title	Year	Peak chart positions			Album
Title	Year	CIS countries	UKR	RUS	Album
"Kholodnoe serdtse" ("Холодное сердце") (GeeGun featuring Anna Sedokova)	2009	181	34	87	Kholodnoe serdtse (GeeGun album)

=== Music videos ===
List of music videos, showing year released and directors
Title	Year	Other artist(s)	Director(s)
As lead artist
"O tebe" ("О тебе")	2016	None	Stanislav Morozov

== Filmography ==
- Cinderella, 2003
- The Evenings On the Homestead, 2004
- Tunguska Meteorite, 2007
- The Power of Attraction, 2008
- The Pregnant, 2011 (Box Office Record in Russia in 2011)

== Published works ==
- Iskusstvo soblazneniya (Russian: Искусство соблазнения), AST (2010) ISBN 978-5-17-064992-1

== See also ==
- Nu Virgos
