= Guardians (2017 film) =

2017 Russian superhero film directed by Sarik Andreasyan

- Theatrical release poster
- Directed by: Sarik Andreasyan
- Written by: Andrei Gavrilov
- Produced by: Sarik Andreasyan; Gevond Andreasyan; Vladimir Polyakov; Aleksey Ryazantsev
- Starring: Sebastien Sisak; Sanzhar Madiyev; Anton Pampushnyy; Alina Lanina; Valeriya Shkirando; Stanislav Shirin; Vyacheslav Razbegaev
- Cinematography: Maksim Osadchiy-Korytkovskiy
- Edited by: Georgiy Isaakyan
- Music by: Georgiy Zheryakov
- Production companies: Enjoy Movies; Argunov Studio; Renovatio
- Distributed by: Karroprokat (Карропрокат)
- Release date: 23 February 2017
- Running time: 89 minutes
- Country: Russia
- Language: Russian
- Budget: $5.4 million (320 million RUB)
- Box office: $15.1 million

Guardians (Russian: Защитники, romanized: Zashchitniki) is a 2017 Russian superhero film directed by Russian-Armenian filmmaker Sarik Andreasyan and starring Sebastien Sisak, Anton Pampushnyy, Sanzhar Madiyev, Alina Lanina, Valeriya Shkirando and Stanislav Shirin.

The film tells the story of a team of Soviet superheroes created during the Cold War. The team includes representatives of the different nationalities of the USSR. Each of the protagonists' superpowers reflect the strengths and traditions of the people of the USSR.

Guardians was met with strongly negative critical reception in Russian media, with many considering it to be one of the worst films ever made. It debuted atop the Russian box office; however, its gross quickly dropped, and Guardians is believed to be a box office bomb, narrowly recovered due to international viewership.

The film was released in the United States with an English dub by Shout! Factory on 5 December 2017.

== Plot ==
During the Cold War, a secret organisation known as "Patriot" assembles a team of Soviet superheroes, genetically altering and augmenting selected individuals to defend the motherland from superhuman threats. Representing different nationalities of the Soviet Union, the team consists of Arseniy (Arsus), who can transform into a powerful bear-man; Temirkhan (Khan), who possesses super speed and wields two curved swords; Lernik (Ler), who can control earth and stone; and Xenia, who can become invisible underwater.

The programme succeeds where a second initiative, Module-1, fails, prompting its creator, Professor Avgust Kuratov, to flee into the wilderness and continue his experiments. When the military attempts to arrest him, Kuratov bombs the Patriot laboratory and survives after being covered in chemicals. He rebuilds his damaged body as a cyborg, gaining the ability to generate electricity and control machines. He also creates an army of clones and resolves to prove his genius to the world. Following the explosion, Arsus, Ler, Khan, and Xenia go into hiding for years.

In the present day, several walking robots used in a training exercise turn against their supervisors and kill them. The Ministry of Defence therefore decides to revive Patriot under Major Elena Larina and locate its missing agents. Elena finds Ler meditating in Armenia, Khan living on the steppes of Kazakhstan, Arsus in a remote cabin in northern Siberia, and Xenia performing circus stunts in Moscow. Their first mission is to raid Kuratov's laboratory in an abandoned factory, but they are captured.

Kuratov offers the Guardians a chance to join him, but they refuse. He imprisons three of them in a magnetic force field and injures Ler. He then takes control of tanks and other military vehicles at a facility in Noginsk, using them to invade Moscow and prepare his Module-2 Project. Kuratov plans to transmit a signal through an old Soviet satellite to every satellite orbiting Earth, allowing him to control all technology worldwide. He protects his beacon with a force field and destroys several attacking fighter jets. When Major-General Nikolai Dolgov, a collaborator in the Russian military, demands a reward, Kuratov strangles him.

Major Elena frees the Guardians and sends Kuratov's former rival to examine one of his clones, but Kuratov releases poison gas and kills him. The Guardians are then trained at the Patriot facility and equipped with suits and weapons.

In Moscow, Xenia and Arsus advance through the streets while Ler defeats soldiers in an underground car park. Khan attempts to fly above Kuratov's force field. The Guardians reach a shopping mall and cross an iron bar towards the beacon, but Kuratov's troops attack them from another pipe. Khan jumps from an aeroplane and uses a grapple line to cut the pipe, sending the soldiers falling.

The Guardians seek to destroy the beacon's power source. Xenia grabs it and short-circuits the system, disabling its transmissions and collapsing the force field, although she is injured. They confront Kuratov atop the tower but cannot defeat him. Khan uses his speed to secure the Guardians to a grappling rope attached to an aeroplane, but Kuratov interferes with the controls. Khan cuts the rope, causing them to fall into a river as the plane crashes.

After emerging, the Guardians consider returning to destroy Kuratov, but Elena orders them not to. She explains that, as superhumans, they can combine their energy into a potentially fatal blast. They join hands and unleash the blast, destroying Kuratov's tower and the surrounding skyscrapers. Kuratov falls to his death, and Elena tells the Guardians that although he claimed to have created them, they created themselves.

The Guardians recover and reunite with Elena in rebuilt Moscow. They decide to return to their normal lives while considering continued service to Patriot. As they leave, Elena tells them, "we found other Guardians."

In a post-credits scene, Elena confronts a soldier after his truck stops. He says that "Ferrum" sent him on an unspecified mission.

== Cast ==
- Sebastien Sisak-Grigoryan as Lernik "Ler" Hovhannisyan, Ler (լեռ) is Armenian for mountain
- Anton Pampushnyy as Arsus/Ursus
- Sanjar Madi/Sanzhar Madiyev as Khan
- Alina Lanina as Xenia/Ksenia
- Valeriya Shkirando as Major Elena Larina, the head of the secret organization, codenamed "Patriot"
- Vyacheslav Razbegaev as Major-general Nikolai Dolgov
- Stanislav Shirin as Professor Avgust Kuratov

== Production ==
=== Filming ===
Filming began on 27 April 2015, in Moscow while the casting process was concluded earlier that year. Filming was continued in Moscow Oblast and in the Crimean Peninsula, and was wrapped on 14 July 2015.

== Release ==
=== Marketing ===
The first trailer was released online in September 2016. Character descriptions were also released up to release which highlighted each team member's connection with a major ethnicity within Russia.

== Reception ==
The reception of Guardians was overwhelmingly negative. On the review aggregator website Rotten Tomatoes, 27% of 11 critics' reviews are positive. The film was almost universally panned in Russian media, such as Meduza, Afisha, Rossiyskaya Gazeta, and Mir Fantastiki, among others, It was mainly criticized for having a derivative plot, bad acting and direction, cheap CGI, plot holes and poor quality, as well as comparisons of the film to Fantastic Four (another film that was critically panned). Critics outside Russia were only slightly kinder to Guardians; however, the reviews in The Times of India, Birth Movies Death and Mid-Day were negative. In November 2017, RIA Novosti placed Guardians at the top of their list of the worst films of all time.

The film attracted online attention outside of Russia before releases for outside territories. Comparisons to Marvel superhero films such as The Avengers and Guardians of the Galaxy were often made, with Arsus, who can transform into a bear, receiving a significant level of attention.

=== Box office ===
Guardians was released 23 February 2017, on a public holiday in Russia, Defender of the Fatherland Day. On its first day, the movie grossed 83 million RUB, and 213 million RUB in first four days, below early expectations, but still at the top of the weekend box office. On its second weekend, Guardians box office dropped 90% down to 21 million RUB, and fourth place. The gross kept dropping by 90% every weekend, and Russian media presumes that Guardians became a box office bomb, narrowly recovered due to international viewership.

In July 2017, Enjoy Movies, the production company behind Guardians, filed for bankruptcy, while Cinema Foundation of Russia, which provided part of the budget, sued the company, defending the jury in the name of national rights.

=== Home media ===
In the United Kingdom, it was 2017's third best-selling foreign language film on home video, below Operation Chromite and Your Name.

== Other media ==
=== Canceled sequel ===
Initially, long before the premiere of the original film and in case of success, a sequel was announced, in which it was supposed to add another superhero from China. Prior to this, the release date of the second part has not yet been announced. Later, Guardians 2 was approved, with Turbo Films, the Chinese distributor of the first film, as a co-production company. It would have reportedly been partially shot in China and have some Chinese characters.

After the critical and commercial failure and declaration of bankruptcy by "Enjoy Movies", director Andreasyan said that he was discussing the sequel with the team, and that they were thinking about "Which of the superheroes to kill :)". The film would also be filmed in conjunction with the "Big Cinema", also founded by the brothers Andreasyans.

On 20 December 2020, in an interview with “Bubble Comics” Sarik Andreasyan was asked why Guardians 2 never came out and the latter explained that “Deadpool 2 was to blame for everything," as its script was reportedly too similar to theirs.

=== Literature ===
Prior to the release of the film, a prequel comic was freely distributed at Comic Con Russia in 2016, titled Guardians: Book 1 and containing the story Guardians: The Broken Curtain and lacking any author credits. The comic depicts the Guardians trying to stop a supervillain named "Manowar" from assassinating the Soviet leader Leonid Brezhnev. Despite several thousand copies of the comic being published and distributed in promotion of the film, suggesting an official release, Andreasyan later claimed via Twitter that the comic was a non-canon fan release. Instead, Andreasyan officially sanction another prequel comic book, which was later published, titled Guardians: A Comic of the New Superhero Universe. Both comics were negatively received by critics, who found the story, the dialogue, and especially the artwork to be sub-par.

A tie-in prose novel titled Guardians: The Reflection was published as well. Written by multiple authors, it contained several separate stories focusing on the main characters of the film.

=== Video games ===
An iOS game titled Guardians - Defence of Justice was released, in which players fight off hordes of attacking enemies.

== See also ==
- Great Ten, DC Comics team of Chinese super heroes
- List of 21st century films considered the worst
- Soviet Super-Soldiers, Marvel Comics super hero team which includes Ursa Major
