= Robo (2019 film) =

- Theatrical release poster
- Directed by: Sarik Andreasyan
- Written by: Aleksey Gravitskiy; Sergey Volkov
- Produced by: Armen Ananikyan; Sarik Andreasyan; Gevond Andreasyan; Vadim Vereshchagin; Rafael Minasbekyan
- Starring: Daniil Muravyev-Izotov; Sergey Bezrukov; Vladimir Vdovichenkov; Mariya Mironova; Konstantin Lavronenko
- Cinematography: Kirill Zotkin
- Edited by: Georgiy Isaakyan
- Production company: Big Cinema House
- Distributed by: Central Partnership
- Release date: October 31, 2019
- Running time: 90 minutes
- Country: Russia
- Language: Russian
- Budget: 150 million RUB
- Box office: $1,106,307; 66 457 401 RUB

Robo (Russian: Робо) is a 2019 Russian children's adventure film directed by Sarik Andreasyan and screenwriters Aleksey Gravitskiy and Sergey Volkov. It stars Daniil Muravyov-Izotov as Mitya Privalov and Sergey Bezrukov as the voice of Robo. The film released on October 31, 2019, by Central Partnership.

== Plot ==
Mitya Privalov is a twelve year old boy who loves to draw comics. However, his parents do not understand his hobby and intend for him to follow them in the field of robotics. Mitya later encounters A-112, a robot created by his parents. His parents intended to write off the project, but Mitya does not want to give it away. He decides to hide the robot's existence and protect it from danger.

== Cast ==
- Daniil Muravyev-Izotov as Dmitriy "Mitya" Privalov
- Sergey Bezrukov as Robo (voice)
- Vladimir Vdovichenkov as Viktor Privalov
- Mariya Mironova as Nadezhda "Nadya" Privalova
- Konstantin Lavronenko as general
- Hrant Tokhatyan as uncle Kolya
- Elizabeth Moryak as Katya
- Elena Borshcheva as physical education teacher

== Release ==
The film was released in Russia on October 31, 2019 by the distributor Central Partnership.
