= Spiral (2014 film) =

- Directed by: Andrey Volgin
- Written by: Konstantin Glushkov; Elena Kovaleva; Renata Piotrovski
- Produced by: Alexey Grishin
- Starring: Anatoliy Rudenko; Konstantin Kryukov; Klarissa Barskaya; Veniamin Smekhov; Aleksandr Yatsko
- Cinematography: Igor Bondarev; Vyacheslav Lisnevsky
- Music by: Alexander Kryukov
- Production company: Python Film Studio
- Release date: February 27, 2014 (Russia)
- Running time: 100 minutes
- Country: Russia
- Language: Russian

Spiral (Russian: Спираль) is a 2014 Russian action film directed by Andrey Volgin.

== Plot ==
Alexey, a talented programmer from Novosibirsk, comes to Moscow and becomes a member of a closed semi-legal elite club called Spiral. As a beginner he is lucky, and he wins one extreme game of the club after another, getting crazy fees. He falls in love with a girl that he could not even dream about.

But overnight the beautiful world around him collapses, and he gets into big trouble - he is accused of robbing a bank, a beloved girl does not believe in his innocence, and on top of everything he is trying to kill.

== Cast ==
- Anatoly Rudenko as Alexey
- Konstantin Kryukov as Stas
- Klarissa Barskaya as Katya
  - Ramilya Iskander as Katya (voice)
- Veniamin Smekhov as Yakob
- Aleksandr Yatsko as Boris
- Nikita Vysotsky as Leonid
- Konstantin Glushkov as Uncle Vitya
- Vladimir Sterzhakov as Mikhail, lawyer
- Odin Biron as Sasha, Yakob's assistant
