= American Heist =

2014 film

- Canadian theatrical release poster
- Directed by: Sarik Andreasyan
- Written by: Raul Inglis
- Based on: The Great St. Louis Bank Robbery by Charles Guggenheim
- Produced by: Tove Christensen; Georgy Malkov; Sarik Andreasyan; Gevond Andreasyan; Vladimir Poliakov
- Starring: Hayden Christensen; Adrien Brody; Jordana Brewster; Tory Kittles; Akon
- Cinematography: Antonio Calvache
- Edited by: Kirill Kozlov; Kiran Pallegadda
- Music by: Roman Vishnevsky; Alim Zairov; Akon (original music tracks)
- Production companies: Glacier Films; Maple Leaf Capital; Primeridian Entertainment; NGN Productions
- Distributed by: Mongrel Media
- Release dates: September 11, 2014 (TIFF); July 24, 2015 (Canada)
- Running time: 94 minutes
- Countries: Canada; Luxembourg; Russia; United States
- Language: English
- Budget: $10 million

American Heist is a 2014 independent action drama film directed by Russian director Sarik Andreasyan, based on the 1959 film The Great St. Louis Bank Robbery directed by Charles Guggenheim. The Canadian-Luxembourgish-Russian-American co-production stars Hayden Christensen, Jordana Brewster, Adrien Brody, Tory Kittles, and Akon. It had its world premiere in the Special Presentations section of the 2014 Toronto International Film Festival on September 11, 2014, and was released theatrically in Canada on July 24, 2015, by Mongrel Media.

== Plot ==
James, a man with nothing to lose, owes his life to his older brother Frankie, who took the rap for a crime they did together. While Frankie served time, James worked to turn his life around: he manages to get a job as a mechanic, and begins courting his girlfriend Emily, a police dispatcher. Now, Frankie is released and back on the streets and pulls his brother into a heist to serve as wheel man.

Initially James refuses. The heist is planned by Frankie's associates Sugar and Ray whose anti-banking rhetoric, violent streak, and elaborate planning have James unwilling to participate. He instead suggests the brothers break ties and flee. Frankie is unable to do this because he is indebted to his associates from his time in prison. During the beginning of his incarceration, Frankie admits that he suffered sexual abuse and humiliation until he fell under the protection of Ray and Sugar and alludes that he would likely not have survived without them. Frankie also informs James that he had mentioned Emily to them as their friendship developed and alludes, she may be in danger if James does not participate in the heist. The brothers spend the next few days bonding, and James tearfully ends his relationship with Emily, hoping to put distance between them.

On the morning of the robbery, the crew is met by a fifth member, Spoonie, who helps initiate several distractions around the city. They then enter the bank planning to gain access to the vault with access codes obtained earlier. The heist proceeds as planned until an eyewitness walking towards the bank sees Frankie through a window and then notices James parked in a car. She flees to a nearby store to call the authorities.

As sirens close in, James enters the bank to inform the group that they have less time than planned. As they begin to move Spoonie is nowhere to be found and it becomes apparent that he had taken the getaway vehicle and fled, stranding them in the bank as police take positions around it.

As the group struggles to come up with a new plan, Frankie initiates a shootout with police, saving James' life and taking a bullet to the abdomen. As Sugar and Ray lay down suppressing fire, James breaks into a nearby car and hot wires it. The group takes a hostage and makes it to the car, but James returns to the bank when he realizes Frankie is being left behind. He discovers his brother contemplating suicide, and Frankie makes it clear he has no intention of going back to prison.

The brothers stall for time as their associates are gunned down one by one as they flee the police. Seeing no other way out, Frankie attacks James, renders him unconscious, and proceeds to dress him in the clothes of a hostage. James regains consciousness just as Frankie exits the bank with him disguised as a hostage. Emily, working from the police dispatch center, looks on in disbelief as she recognizes a bloody James and unmasked Frankie. A police sniper kills Frankie on live news and James is ushered into an ambulance, where he attacks the paramedic and discreetly makes an escape in the rain. As the paramedic regains consciousness and calls it in over the government radio, the call is routed to Emily, who gets up and leaves her workstation. James takes a moment to relax while he sits down on a trolley as the film ends.

== Cast ==
- Hayden Christensen as James Jimmy Kelly
- Adrien Brody as Frankie Kelly
- Jordana Brewster as Emily
- Akon as Sugar
- Tory Kittles as Ray
- Luis Da Silva Jr. as Spoonie
- Rachel Bilson as eyewitness

== Production ==
Glacier Films produced the film within $10 million range.

Principal photography of the film began in June 2013 in New Orleans, Louisiana.

== Box office ==
American Heist was only screened in 10 theaters in the U.S. and grossed a very small sum: $251, according to The Numbers or $5,800, according to Movie City News, with an additional $1,760,247 grossed from home video sales. In Russia and ex-Soviet countries, the movie had a wider release and grossed more than $2 million, still below the movie's budget of $10,000,000, and is considered a box office bomb.

== Reception ==
American Heist has an approval rating of 13% on review aggregator website Rotten Tomatoes, based on 16 reviews, and an average rating of 3.6/10. Metacritic assigned the film a weighted average score of 23 out of 100, based on 6 critics, indicating "generally unfavorable" reviews. Reception in Russian media was also predominantly negative; according to Kritikanstvo and Megacritic aggregators, Russian critics ranked the movie 3.5 out of 10 on average.
