= The Pregnant =

2011 film by Sarik Andreasyan

- Theatrical release poster
- Directed by: Sarik Andreasyan
- Written by: Sarik Andreasyan; Gevond Andreasyan; Georgiy Malkov
- Produced by: Sarik Andreasyan; Gevond Andreasyan; Georgiy Malkov
- Starring: Dmitri Dyuzhev; Anna Sedokova; Mikhail Galustyan; Ville Haapasalo
- Cinematography: Anton Zenkovich
- Music by: Aleksandr Vartanov
- Production companies: Enjoy Movies; Leopolis
- Release date: 8 September 2011 (Russia)
- Running time: 85 minutes
- Country: Russia
- Language: Russian
- Budget: $2 million
- Box office: $7 372 540

The Pregnant (Russian: Беременный, romanized: Beremenniy) is a 2011 Russian fantasy comedy film directed by Sarik Andreasyan. It stars Dmitri Dyuzhev, Anna Sedokova, Mikhail Galustyan and Ville Haapasalo. The Hindi remake rights are owned by T-Series and Maddock Films.

== Plot ==
Sergei and Diana Dobrolyubov have long dreamt of having a child, but Diana simply isn't getting pregnant. Sergei, who works as a TV presenter at the Muz-TV channel, makes a wish to a falling star (“I want a child”), and his wish is fulfilled, but with a catch: instead of his wife, he, himself, becomes pregnant. Sergei's friend, Zhora, convinces him that pregnancy is not a reason to hide, but instead is an opportunity to gain fame and money. The show "The Pregnant" becomes the most popular television project, and its main character, Sergei Dobrolyubov - a star. He soon gets accosted by the media causing a lots of drama between himself and Diana. A gay couple continuously pester him on his "secret" for getting pregnant, and a sinister prosecutor believes he is a phony. In the end, in order to give birth to his child in peace, Sergei decides to inform his fans that he falsified the pregnancy. Shortly afterwards, he goes into labor and gives birth to a baby boy. A couple of years later, Sergei and Diana are happy parents when Diana decides to also make a wish on a star, but with a new catch: both Diana and Sergei are pregnant together.

== Cast ==
- Dmitri Dyuzhev as Sergei Dobrolyubov
- Anna Sedokova as Diana Dobrolyubova, Sergey's wife
- Mikhail Galustyan as Zhora, Sergey's friend
- Ville Haapasalo as director
- Dmitry Sharakois as dr. Tikhonov
- Svetlana Khodchenkova as prosecutor
- Dmitry Khrustalyov as Edgar, gay man
- Victor Vasiliev as Slavik, gay man
- Lyudmila Artemyeva as Sergey's mother
- Valentin Smirnitsky as Sergey's father
- Vadim Takmenev as cameo
- Timur Solovyov as cameo
- Nikolai Naumov as reporter
- Anton Sasin as President of Russia
- Ekaterina Klimova as tow truck driver
- Ekaterina Vilkova as Anna

== Music ==
The film's score was written by Aleksandr Vartanov. The following songs are featured in the picture.

- Egor Solodovnikov — "The Pregnant"
- Anna Sedokova — "Space"
- Dmitri Dyuzhev — "I'm at that Threshold"
- Grigory Leps — "Rustle"
- Gloria Gaynor — "I Will Survive"
- Queen — "I Want to Break Free"
- Roy Orbison — "Oh, Pretty Woman"
- Aleksander Serov — "I Love You to Tears"
- Yulia Nelson — "All I Need Is You"

== Reception ==
The film received generally negative reviews in Russian media with many of them negatively comparing it to the more famous Arnold Schwarzenegger comedy Junior.
