= Enjoy Movies =

Russian film studio

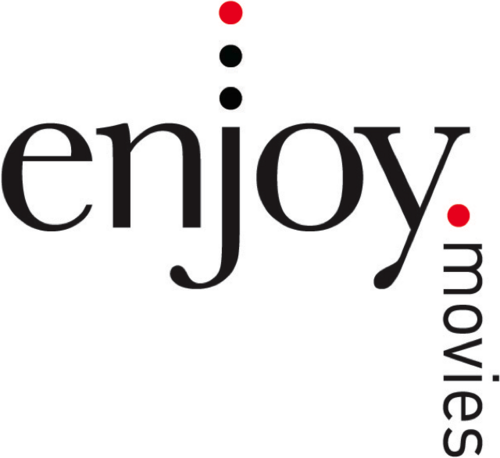
- Industry: Cinema
- Founded: 2010
- Founder: Sarik Andreasyan, Gevond Andreasyan, Georgiy Malkov
- Defunct: 2018
- Headquarters: Moscow, (Russian HQ)
- Area served: Europe, North America
- Key people: Sarik Andreasyan (Director, screenwriter, Producer); Gevond Andreasyan (Producer); Georgiy Malkov (producer)
- Products: Motion pictures
- Services: Movie Production
- Website: Enjoy-Movies.Ru (closed)

Enjoy Movies was a Russian production company, founded in 2010 by an Armenian director Sarik Andreasyan, his brother the producer Gevond Andreasyan and producer Georgy Malkov. The company is based in Moscow, Russia.

The company's first movie release was in September 2011, under the title of The Pregnant. In 2012, Enjoy Movies released 5 successful feature films, which allowed the company to gain 25% of the market share. In the process, Enjoy Movies gained on average around $27.9M, which was 10 times more than they had initially spent on movie production and placed 1st on Filmpro.ru's top 10 list of most successful Russian production companies in 2012.

In May 2013, during the annual Cannes film festival, Enjoy Movies announced the formation of their alliance company Glacier Films in cooperation with Hayden Christensen and his older brother Tove. During a 3-year term, Glacier Films intended to produce 11 micro-budget movies worth $1.5M each. Glacier's first movie, American Heist, starring Hayden Christensen himself, is based on the 1959 film The Great St. Louis Bank Robbery, directed by Charles Guggenheim and John Stix.

In July 2017, Enjoy Movies initially announced that it was declaring bankruptcy, but shortly afterwards in September 2017 stated that they went out of bankruptcy.

As of November 2021, Enjoy Movies did not produce newer films after they successfully went out of bankruptcy as well as their website was shut down.

== List of films produced by Enjoy Movies ==
Film	Year	Box office	Notes
The Pregnant	2011	$8.3M	
Moms	2012	$7.8M	
Some Sloppy Friend	2012	$11.3M	
Nannies	2012	$5.7M	
Guard on Warranty	2012	$4.8M	
I'll be Next by Your Side	2012	$38,000	
Happy New Year, Moms!	2012	$12.7M	
The Double	2013	$7.2M	
That Was The Men's World	2013	$11.3M	
Lucky Island	2013	–	–
Friends' Friends	2014	–	–
American Heist	2015	$2.34M	Box office flop
Guardians	2017	$15.1M	-
