= Sarik Andreasyan =

Russian director, producer and screenwriter

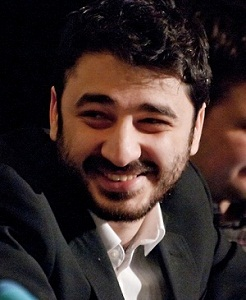
- Sarik Andreasyan in March 2012
- Born: Sarik Garnikovich Andreasyan
- Occupations: Film director, film producer, screenwriter

Sarik Garnikovich Andreasyan (Russian: Сарик Гарникович Андреасян; Armenian: Սարիկ Գառնիկի Անդրեասյան) is a Russian Armenian director, producer, and screenwriter who has worked on films and commercials. He is the founder of Enjoy Movies. In May 2017, Andreasyan left Enjoy Movies studio to start another studio, Bolshoe Kino (Big Movies in Russian).

His early movies were mostly low-budget comedies. However, since 2015, Sarik began to move towards science fiction, action and dramas.

== Reception ==
Most of Andreasyan's films were met with negative critical reception in Russian media, according to review aggregators Kritikanstvo and Megacritic. Notable exceptions are the drama Earthquake and anthology film duology Moms, that received more positive reviews. Only two movies by Andreasyan were rated by Rotten Tomatoes, both American Heist and Guardians have a "rotten" rating.

His early comedies, such as The Pregnant ($8.3M Gross), Moms ($7.8M Gross), What Men Do! ($11.3M Gross), were commercial hits. Andreasyan's recent high-budget movies, however, are considered box office bombs, according to various Russian media. This includes American Heist, Mafia: The Game of Survival, and Guardians.

Andreasyan's disaster drama film Earthquake was selected as the Armenian entry for the Best Foreign Language Film at the 89th Academy Awards, but was disqualified by the Academy.

=== Scandals ===
In March 2025, during a lecture at Moscow Film College No. 40, Sarik Andreasyan sparked controversy by criticizing auteur cinema and filmmaker Andrei Tarkovsky.

=== Sanctions ===
In October 2022 Ukraine sanctioned Sarik Andreasyan for being involved in Russian propaganda and spreading misinformation relating to the Russian invasion of Ukraine.

== Filmography ==
Year	Film	Status		
Year	Film	Director	Screenwriter	Producer
2009	Lopuhi	Yes	Yes	No
2011	Office Romance. Our Time	Yes	Yes	No
2011	The Pregnant	Yes	Yes	Yes
2012	Moms	Yes	Yes	Yes
2012	Some Sloppy Friend	Yes	Yes	Yes
2012	Nannies	No	No	Yes
2012	Guard on Warranty	No	No	Yes
2012	Happy New Year, Moms!	Yes	Yes	Yes
2013	The Double	No	No	Yes
2013	Sex Competition	Yes	Yes	Yes
2013	Lucky Island	No	No	Yes
2013	Friends' Friends	No	No	Yes
2014	Sex Competition 2	Yes	Yes	Yes
2014	American Heist	Yes	No	No
2016	Earthquake	Yes	Yes	Yes
2016	Mafia: The Game of Survival	Yes	No	No
2017	Guardians	Yes	No	Yes
2017	Love in the City of Angels	Yes	Yes	Yes
2018	Unforgiven	Yes	No	Yes
2019	Girls Are Different	Yes	No	No
2019	Robo	Yes	No	Yes
2020	Goodbye, America!	Yes	No	Yes
2024	Onegin	Yes	No	Yes
2024	7 Days, 7 Nights	No	No	Yes
2026	Prostokvashino	Yes	No	Yes
TBA	We	No	No	Yes
