= Kritikanstvo =

Russian-language review aggregator

Критиканство
- Website type: Review aggregator
- Website: kritikanstvo.ru
- Launched: March 2013; 13 years ago
- Current status: Active

Kritikanstvo (Russian: Критиканство) is a Russian-language review aggregator website. It aggregates reviews of films and video games. It was described as a Russian counterpart of Metacritic. It was launched in March 2013.

In Russian, the word "kritikanstvo" means picky and biased criticism.

== Content ==
Kritikanstvo has pages for sources of the reviews used. It has also rating pages for critics and publishers of criticisms. Users can give their own reviews and ratings, which are kept separate from that of critics. Films can be filtered by genre, country, and release year. Similarly, games can be filtered by the platforms they were released for.
