= Dmitry Dokuchaev =

Russian intelligence officer (born 1984)

- Дмитрий Александрович Докучаев
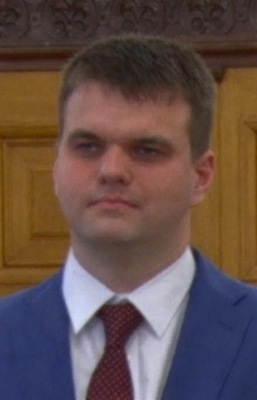
- Born: Dmitry Aleksandrovich Dokuchaev; 28 February 1984 (age 42); Russia
- Other names: Dmitry Aleksandrovich Dokuchayev, "Forb", "Patrick Nag"
- Citizenship: Russian
- Education: Ural State University
- Occupation: FSB officer
- Known for: Hacking
- Status: Released from prison on 13 May 2021
- Conviction: Treason
- Criminal charge: Treason
- Penalty: 6 years in prison

Dmitry Aleksandrovich Dokuchaev (Russian: Дмитрий Александрович Докучаев; born 28 February 1984) is a Russian convicted cyber criminal and a former intelligence officer of the Federal Security Service (FSB), the principal security agency of Russia. In April 2019, he was sentenced to six years in prison for treason.

== Early career ==
From 2004 to 2011, Dokuchaev contributed to a Russian computer hacking magazine under the moniker "Forb."

== FSB employment ==
At the end of 2006, Dokuchaev had begun working for the FSB in Yekaterinburg, reportedly in order to avoid prison time due to credit card and data theft offenses. The following year, he was transferred to Moscow.

In 2011, Dokuchaev had reportedly begun acting as an intermediary between his boss, Sergei Mikhailov (FSB), and Kaspersky Lab employee, Ruslan Stoyanov, ultimately causing operational information about ChronoPay CEO, Pavel Vrublevsky, to be passed outside of Russia.

Beginning in December 2014, Dokuchaev had allegedly begun directing criminal hackers to obtain access to and collect information from the email accounts of thousands of Yahoo! users.

In early 2016, Dokuchaev and Mikhailov had reportedly begun recruiting the services of Vladimir Anikeyev, the ringleader of Shaltai Boltai.

In the fall of 2016, Dokuchaev was reportedly part of an effort to lure Anikeyev back into Russia.

== Arrest in Russia ==
Dokuchaev was arrested in December 2016.

His arrest was first announced on 26 January 2017.

== U.S. indictment ==
In March 2017, Dokuchaev was indicted by the U.S. Department of Justice for his alleged role in the 2014 Yahoo! data breaches.

== Conviction in Russia ==
In February 2019, Dokuchaev agreed to sign a plea bargain with Russian authorities. In April 2019, he was sentenced to six years in prison for treason.
