= Kochetov (disambiguation) =

Kochetov is a Russian surname.

Kochetov may also refer to:

- Kochetov, Bryansk Oblast, village in Russia
- Kochetov, Saratov Oblast, village in Russia
