= Sergei Mikhailov (FSB) =

Russian intelligence official (born 1974)

- Сергей Михайлов
- Born: 1974 (age 51–52); Minsk, Belarusian SSR, USSR
- Known for: Deputy head of the FSB security agency’s Center for Information Security
- Conviction: Treason
- Criminal charges: Treason
- Penalty: 22 years in prison

Sergei Mikhailov (Russian: Сергей Михайлов) was deputy head of the FSB security agency’s Center for Information Security. In February 2019, he was sentenced to 22 years in prison for treason.

== Early life ==
Mikhailov was reportedly born and raised in Belarus and accepted Russian citizenship sometime during the 1990s.

== Career ==
=== Foreign recruitment ===
Mikhailov was reportedly recruited in Lyon at an Interpol conference set up by USPS investigator Gregory Crabb in 2005.

=== Pavel Vrublevsky ===
Mikhailov had known Pavel Vrublevsky, the CEO of ChronoPay, since about 2007.

In 2011, and reportedly at times earlier, Mikhailov, in addition to his deputy, Dmitry Dokuchaev, and a Kaspersky Lab employee, Ruslan Stoyanov, had caused classified information about Vrublevsky to be passed along to U.S. intelligence agencies. Mikhailov and Stoyanov had reportedly intended to sell ChronoPay's database for $10 million.

=== Shaltai Boltai ===
In early 2016, Mikhailov's FSB unit had reportedly begun the process of recruiting Vladimir Anikeyev, the ringleader of Shaltai Boltai.

By around the summer of 2016, Shaltai Boltai had reportedly been taken over by Mikhailov.

In October 2016, Mikhailov had reportedly become alarmed when he learned that Anikeyev had been detained by another unit within the FSB.

=== 2016 U.S. election ===
During the 2016 U.S. election, Mikhailov was reportedly involved in talks with management from Sberbank about creating an NSA-like special internet service that would be controlled by Mikhailov.

Around late summer 2016, Mikhailov had reportedly come to the attention of his colleagues in the FSB after U.S. reports had linked Vladimir Fomenko, the owner of King Servers and an alleged business partner of Vrublevsky, to a cyber attack on voter registration systems in Arizona and Illinois.

== Arrest ==
In early December 2016, Mikhailov was arrested in Moscow, reportedly due to information that Vrublevsky had provided to Russian authorities earlier in 2010.

During a raid on his country house and Moscow apartment, Russian security forces reportedly found about $12 million in cash.

Later reports suggested that Mikhailov's arrest had been caused by Vladimir Anikeyev.

Mikhailov's arrest was first announced on January 25, 2017.

== U.S. indictment ==
Mikhailov is strongly suggested to be "FSB Officer 3" in a March 2017 DOJ indictment related to the Yahoo! data breaches.

== Conviction ==
In February 2019, Mikhailov was sentenced to 22 years in prison for treason. The case reportedly centered around allegations that classified information from the FSB's probe into ChronoPay had been leaked to Kimberly Zenz, a senior threat analyst at Verisign.
