= AllOfMP3 =

Russian online music store

- Launched: 2000
- Platform: Platform Independent
- Availability: Russia, legal status in other locations is questionable.
- Website: allofmp3.ru www.AllTunes.ru www.allofmp3.com

AllOfMP3, MP3Sparks and MemphisMembers are brands of online music store that were operated by Mediaservices, Inc., a company founded in 2000 in Moscow, Russia. The stores formerly sold music encoded in standard, non-protected audio formats at a significantly lower cost than other online music stores. In 2008, the original AllOfMp3 site was replaced by a blog.

The company has been plagued by legal issues for some time due to accusations, mainly from the record industry, that they are operating illegally and engaging in music piracy.

== Revenue ==
Run by the Moscow company MediaServices, AllOfMP3 had an estimated revenue of US$30 million in 2006. According to the IFPI and various other label representatives the company has never transferred money to any (western) label. AllofMP3 claims to have offered settlements to IFPI, which AllOfMP3 claims IFPI refused to accept.

== Legal issues ==
AllOfMP3's legality is controversial. It is licensed in Russia by the Russian Organization for Multimedia and Digital Systems, a licence similar to agreements held by Russian radio stations. AllOfMP3 states that this agreement allows it to distribute music legally from all artists and all labels. This is disputed by most major record labels, which generally do not recognize ROMS or believe that it has the authority to distribute their works. AllOfMP3.com makes no claims as to its legality outside of Russia. However it is accessible to visitors in all countries.

In 2005, Moscow authorities began investigating the site as a result of a formal complaint from the International Federation of the Phonographic Industry (IFPI), who accused the site of "large-scale copyright infringement".

On June 1, 2006, The New York Times reported that US trade negotiators have warned Russia that the continued existence of AllOfMP3 could jeopardize Russia's entry into the World Trade Organization. This was reiterated by the United States Trade Representative Susan Schwab in remarks to the US Chamber of Commerce on September 28, 2006. She later told reporters that "I have a hard time imagining Russia becoming a member of the WTO and having a Web site like that up and running that is so clearly a violation of everyone's intellectual property rights."

Pressure from the IFPI resulted in AllOfMP3 being blocked by the Danish Internet service provider (ISP), Tele2 in October 2006.

On December 18, 2006, the RIAA, on behalf of EMI, Sony BMG, Universal Music Group, and Warner Music Group filed a US$1.65 trillion lawsuit against the site. That equates to US$150,000 for each of 11 million songs downloaded between June and October 2006, and exceeds Russia's entire GDP. $150,000 is the statutory limit for copyright infringement awards in the United States. Allofmp3 responded to the lawsuit saying "AllofMP3 understands that several U.S. record label companies filed a lawsuit against Media Services in New York. This suit is unjustified as AllofMP3 does not operate in New York. Certainly the labels are free to file any suit they wish, despite knowing full well that AllofMP3 operates legally in Russia. In the meantime, AllofMP3 plans to continue to operate legally and comply with all Russian laws."

In May 2007, UK police arrested a 25-year-old man on fraud charges for selling allofmp3.com vouchers on sites such as eBay and allofmp3vouchers.co.uk. The man was reported to be funneling money from the sale of these vouchers back to the owners of the site in Russia. A statement in relation to this alleged transfer of funds to Russia was made by the British Phonographic Industry chairman.

In 2007 Allofmp3 was banned from service by its payment processor ChronoPay.

In an interview with p2pnet, a MediaServices representative said "It is disappointing that United States Trade Representative Susan Schwab completely and deliberately mischaracterized AllofMP3.com. Furthermore, it is irresponsible to use AllofMP3.com as a negotiating instrument in an attempt to extract concessions from Russia in return for US support for accession to the World Trade Organization".

In July 2007, a Moscow court ruled that Visa's decision to cut off payments to allTunes was illegal.

In August 2007, Denis Kvasov, head of the company which owned AllofMP3.com, was acquitted of all charges stemming from copyright infringement prosecution. The prosecution was seen as a test case of Russia's commitment to fighting piracy, and was brought after EMI, NBC Universal and Time Warner lobbied for such prosecution.

In January 2008 The Register reported that MP3Sparks.com and its associated web sites were being hosted (since December 2007) by AbdAllah Internet, a Turkish web hosting service which allegedly provides safe harbour for spam and malware operations as well as having strong links to the Russian Business Network. For this reason access to the AbdAllah network is blocked by some ISPs, including all UK members of LINX, therefore blocking access to MP3Sparks as well.

On May 20, 2008, the RIAA dropped all copyright infringement charges against AllOfMP3.com.

== Closure of AllOfMP3 ==
In June 2007, AllOfMP3 announced on their site that they were "closed for maintenance", while Times Online reported that an unnamed person claiming to be an ex-employee told them it was closed down following pressure from the Russian government. MP3Sparks, however, remained available, as did the AllTunes download service.

Following the acquittal of Denis Kvasov by a Moscow court in August 2007, a brief message was posted at the site's blog, stating "The service will be resumed in the foreseeable future".

== About the services ==
The sites offer Russian and English user interfaces. All functions, except for the buying of songs and full length song previews, are available to unregistered users (and full length preview of songs is restricted to individuals who have spent a total of $50 or more on the website). Registration is free. The store maintains an account balance for each user; while a user's account has a positive balance, they can continue downloading music. To do so, the user selects the files for download from the store's catalog.

=== Pricing model ===
Unlike some US-based music stores such as Apple's iTunes Store, MediaServices' sites charge for the volume of data downloaded, not for individual songs.

This price is often reduced by a complicated system of discounts based on cumulative usage, promotions, and type of payment.

=== Payment methods ===
The sites operate using a pre-paid balance method. Users fund their account using a credit or debit card, in increments of US$10 or more.

However, action taken in late 2006 by Visa and MasterCard made it impossible for users to fund their accounts at the main AllOfMP3 site.

Users outside UK and US can also pay using a variety of credit cards at ChronoPay processor. ChronoPay had announced on March 20, 2007, that they would no longer be processing payments from online Russian music stores that only hold a ROMS license (e.g. AllOfMP3), but this does not apply to MP3Sparks which has an NP FAIR license.

Between April and June 2007, it had become difficult for users to fund their AllOfMP3 accounts themselves, and a number of users and sites began selling AllOfMP3 gift vouchers on the Internet. However, in May 2007 a man who had been selling vouchers was arrested in London, and this led many other voucher sellers to shut down their operations.

=== Download formats ===
AllOfMP3 (and now MP3Sparks) allows users to choose from a variety of audio codecs for audio files. Lossy formats are offered in constant bitrates up to 320 kbit/s or variable bitrates up to maximum quality in the following formats:

- MP3
- WMA
- Ogg Vorbis
- MPEG4-AAC
- MPC

Select albums are also being made available in Lossless audio codecs in the following formats:

- FLAC
- PCM
- Monkey's Audio
- OptimFROG
- WMA Lossless

Most music is encoded straight from source, which is dubbed Online Encoding Exclusive, so gapless albums could provide gapless playback, unlike most other music services. There is no extra charge for using the Online Encoding Exclusive service. The user sets the codec parameters, including the desired bitrate, allowing for superior quality over other music download services such as iTunes and Napster.

Downloaded files do not contain digital rights management information, allowing unrestricted use between multiple computers and digital audio players. This differentiates AllOfMP3 from many other music download services, which limit the use of the music the user may purchase and the platforms on which it may be played.

The websites also offer free, full album previews, streamed at a bitrate of 24 kilobits per second (roughly equivalent to analog telephone audio quality). Registered users who have spent less than $50 have access to 90 second samples, and unregistered users have access to 30 second samples.

==== Music for Masses ====
In late 2006, AllOfMP3 experimented with a feature called "Music for Masses" which allowed users to download DRM-protected music for free. The files were encoded in a proprietary MP3 format (.mp3x) that could only be played in the Music for Masses player, and could not be transferred to a portable media device. However, the DRM protection was cracked within a week. Although AllOfMP3 released a compulsory update to the player software which rendered the original crack unusable, they eventually removed the service in December 2006.
