= Ruslan Stoyanov =

Russian computer scientist and criminal (born 1975)

- Руслан Стоянов
- Born: 1975; Taganrog, Rostov Oblast, Russia
- Citizenship: Russian
- Occupation: Computer scientist
- Conviction: Treason
- Criminal charge: Treason
- Penalty: 14 years in prison

Ruslan Stoyanov (born 1975) is a Russian computer scientist. In December 2016, he was arrested on charges of treason as part of the Mikhailov case. In 2019, he was sentenced to 14 years in prison.

== Career ==
From around 2000 to 2006, Stoyanov worked in the Ministry of Internal Affairs (Russia) investigating cyber crime.

In 2010, Stoyanov was reportedly the owner of Indrik, a computer crime investigative firm, until it was bought by Kaspersky Labs in 2012. From then on, he worked in the computer incident investigation department of Kaspersky Labs until his arrest in 2016.

== Arrest ==
In early December 2016, Stoyanov was arrested by the FSB on charges of treason. In Russia, treason is defined possessing secret information. even without sharing it, or as sharing information with a foreign state that damages state security. The new law does not require authorities to prove a suspect damaged state security.

In Stoyanov's case, he was accused of sharing information about convicted Russian cyber criminal Pavel Vrublevsky with American authorities. Stoyanov, along with two other men involved in the conviction of Vrublevksy, were among those accused.

== Conviction ==
In February 2019, a Moscow court convicted Stoyanov of high treason, and sentenced him to 14 years in prison.

He was alleged to have caused Russian state secrets about convicted cybercriminal Pavel Vrublevsky's company, ChronoPay, to be passed along to the FBI. He was specifically accused of giving information about Vrublevksy's criminal operations to Kimberly Zenz, a private sector cybersecurity researcher that the court accused of being an American agent.

Zenz denied all such accusations and asked the court to permit her to testify. The Russian court ignored her request. Zenz discussed her experience with the accusations, and the infighting among the Russian security services that she believes played a role in the accusations. In their book, The Red Web: The Struggle Between Russia's Digital Dictators and the New Online Revolutionaries, Russian investigative journalists Andrei Soldatov and Irina Borogan report that the case was also motivated by a desire by Russian security services to stop international cooperation between Russian investigators and researchers and those in the West.

== Hospitalization ==
In October 2018, Stoyanov had reportedly suffered a pulmonary embolism.
