= Russian Organization for Multimedia and Digital Systems =

Russian Organization for Multimedia and Digital Systems (ROMS, Russian: РОМС), also known as Russian Multimedia and Internet Society, is a Russian collective rights management organization. ROMS is a body designated by Russian law for collecting and distributing statutory copyright royalty payments from radio stations and Internet download sites in Russia. It is disputed whether they are authorized by law to allow music for download. This in 2015 was pending in the Russian legal system.

== Timeline ==
- Was created in 2000 by Russian Authors Society.
- Banned from payment services by its credit card processor company Chronopay due to a law dispute. ROMS filed a complaint with the Prosecutor's Office against ChronoPay and its owner Pavel Vrublevsky, claiming a market monopolisation by it. This complaint resulted in neither judicial nor criminal action.
- Out of operations from 2009 after changing Russian copyright law in 2008.

== Websites ==
Website	Licensing terms	Date	Notes
AllOfMP3	Under the licenses terms, alloffmp3.org pays license fees for all materials downloaded from the site subject to the Law of the Russian Federation "On Copyright and Related Rights". It was a major client of ROMS, which makes up about 50% of its cashflow.	25 Feb 2011	
LegalSounds	All the materials in the LegalSounds.com music service are available for distribution via Internet according to license ЛС-3М-05-09 of the Russian Multimedia and Internet Society. Under the license agreement, Legalsounds.com pays license fees for all the materials subject to the Law of the Russian Federation "On Copyright and Related Rights."	25 Feb 2011	
boxmp3.net	Under the licenses terms, boxmp3.net pays license fees for all materials downloaded from the site subject to the Law of the Russian Federation "On Copyright and Related Rights".	25 Feb 2011	
Lavamus	Under the licenses terms, lavamus.com pays license fees for all materials downloaded from the site subject to the Law of the Russian Federation "On Copyright and Related Rights".	25 Feb 2011	
Soundike	The availability over the Internet of the Soundike.com materials is authorized by the license # 43/17M-10 of the Rightholders Federation for Collective Copyright Management of Works Used Interactively (NP "FAIR") issued for Preluna Group LTD. All these materials are solely for personal use. Any further distribution, resale or broadcasting is prohibited. A difference in Laws, concerning copyright material, in different jurisdictions, does not allow administration of the web site Soundike.com, to say that all of the services which this web site provides are completely legal in all the Countries. Final decree about legality of using Soundike.com services should be made by the consumer of such services.	25 Feb 2011	
