= Kochetov =

Kochetov (masculine, Russian: Кочетов) or Kochetova (feminine, Russian: Кочетова) is a Russian surname associated with the Russian noble Kochetov families. Notable people with the surname include:

- Aleksandr Kochetov
- Anna Kochetova
- Lyubov Kochetova
- Pavel Kochetov
- Vsevolod Kochetov
