= Kimberly Zenz =

Computer security specialist

- Born: Kimberly Zenz

Kimberly Zenz is a cybersecurity researcher with an emphasis on the RuNet. Her work experience includes RuNet researcher at Verisign iDefense and Head of Threat Intelligence at the Deutsche Cyber-Sicherheitsorganisation (German Cyber Security Organization). In 2019, a Moscow court reportedly accused her of passing along information of interest to the Russian government to U.S. intelligence officials. Zenz refuted these accusations and repeatedly requested to testify. The court ignored her request and did not permit her to testify.

== Education ==
Zenz went to Episcopal High School (Alexandria, Virginia), College of William & Mary, and Georgetown's School of Foreign Service.

== Career in the RuNet ==
Zenz previously worked as senior analyst for Verisign's iDefense threat intelligence based in Reston, Virginia, with an emphasis on Russian-speaking cybercriminals. She also worked as Head of Threat Intelligence at the Deutsche Cyber-Sicherheitsorganisation (German Cyber Security Organization) in Berlin, where she created the international research program. She was also a nonresident senior fellow with the Cyber Statecraft Initiative at the Atlantic Council's Scowcroft Center for Strategy and Security in Washington DC.

Her work has been featured in multiple books and media publications, including Spam Nation by Brian Krebs, Fatal System Error by Joseph Menn. She is the co-author of Cyberfraud: Tactics, Techniques and Procedures" and the Oxford University Publication titled "Cyber Security in the Russian Federation."

== U.S. intelligence allegations ==
In 2010, ChronoPay CEO Pavel Vrublevsky alleged that Zenz had been passing along information about his company to U.S. intelligence officials. Mr. Vrublevsky is a convicted cybercriminal who served time in Russian prison. The men accused in the treason case all participated in his investigation and conviction.

In 2019, a Moscow court reportedly accused Zenz of passing information about Mr. Vrublevksy's criminal operations to U.S. intelligence officials. They accused renowned Russian cybercriminal investigator Ruslan Stoyanov of giving her the materials.

Zenz has denied these claims. She was in Moscow the week before the accused men were arrested, but was never questioned. She also requested to testify for the defense, but all of her requests were ignored by the Russian court. In 2019, Zenz spoke at BlackHat USA about the case, her experiences being accused, and the infighting among Russian security services that she believes played a role in the Russian treason case.

In their book, "The Red Web: The Struggle Between Russia’s Digital Dictators and the New Online Revolutionaries," Russian investigative journalists Andrei Soldatov and Irina Borogan report that the case was also motivated by a desire by Russian security services to stop international cooperation between Russian investigators and researchers and those in the West.
