= Alexander Glazastikov =

Russian activist

Alexander Olegovich Glazastikov
- Александр Олегович Глазастиков
- Citizenship: Russian
- Known for: Hacking
- Criminal charge: Unlawful access to computer information

Alexander Olegovich Glazastikov (Александр Олегович Глазастиков) is a Russian co-founder of the anonymous group Shaltai Boltai. In 2017, he applied for political asylum in Estonia. In October 2018, he was arrested in absentia in Russia.

== Early interactions with Anikeyev ==
Glazastikov reportedly met Vladimir Anikeyev at a party in Russia sometime between 2003 and 2005. The two would infrequently stay in touch over the years.

In 2013, Anikeyev proposed the idea of creating a political blog, as well as an accompanying Twitter account. Glazastikov concurred, and considered being an official press secretary for the blog.

== Shaltai Boltai ==
During its first year, Shaltai Boltai had published the private correspondence of an assortment of Russian public figures, including Arkady Dvorkovich, Dmitry Medvedev, Robert Schlegel, Timur Prokopenko, Igor Strelkov (officer), and Yevgeny Prigozhin.

== Fallout from Anikeyev's arrest ==
In February 2017, shortly after press reports had announced that Anikeyev had been arrested in Russia, Glazastikov told TV Rain that he would be applying for asylum in Estonia.

In October 2018, Glazastikov was arrested in absentia by the Moscow City Court.
