= Vladimir Anikeyev =

Russian detainee and hacker

Vladimir Fedorovich Anikeyev
- Владимир Федорович Аникеев
- Born: June 26, 1974 (age 52); Makhachkala
- Other name: Lewis
- Citizenship: Russian
- Known for: Shaltai Boltai
- Conviction: Unlawful access to computer information
- Criminal charges: Unlawful access to computer information
- Penalty: 2 years in prison

Vladimir Fedorovich Anikeyev (Владимир Федорович Аникеев) is the former ringleader of the anonymous group Shaltai Boltai. He was detained in Russia in November 2016, and was later sentenced to two years in prison for unlawful access to computer information.

== Early career ==
Anikeyev worked in the St. Petersburg media during the 1990s. He reportedly was not regarded as a great writer, but he was able to acquire many contacts in the Russian government.

At a party in Russia around 2004, Anikeyev had reportedly met Alexander Glazastikov and Konstantin Teplyakov, two future members of Shaltai Boltai.

In 2013, Anikeyev proposed the idea of occasionally publishing political materials that might be of interest to the public. Glazastikov concurred. The two would later discuss who would be called Shaltai and who would be called Boltai when communicating with reporters.

== Shaltai Boltai ==
At the end of 2013, Shaltai Boltai gained instant fame in Russia when a leaked transcript of the speech that Vladimir Putin was planning to give on New Year's Eve was published on their blog.

The following year, communications from high-profile figures like Arkady Dvorkovich and Yevgeny Prigozhin were published, culminating in the Shaltai Boltai blog being blocked by Russia authorities.

In the summer of 2014, Anikeyev was reportedly approached by an intermediary of a potential client who was interested in acquiring the identities of members of Shaltai Boltai.

By early 2016, due to concerns that Russian intelligence services would soon be able to identify Anikeyev's source network, operations at Shaltai Boltai were reportedly halted.

== FSB influence ==
Teplyakov claims that Anikeyev was recruited by the FSB in August 2015.

Other reports say Anikeyev's cooperation with the FSB, specifically Sergei Mikhailov (FSB) and Dmitry Dokuchaev, began sometime in 2016.

Anikeyev himself has denied these reports.

== Arrest ==
In October 2016, Anikeyev was reportedly lured away from Kyiv and towards the border of Belarus, where he was detained and then transported to Russia.

In January 2017, Anikeyev pleaded guilty to unlawful access to computer information.

His arrest was first announced on January 28, 2017.

== Conviction ==
In July 2017, Anikeyev was sentenced to two years in prison.

He was released in August 2018.
