= The New Nobility =

2010 novel by Andrei Soldatov and Irina Borogan

The New Nobility: The Restoration of Russia's Security State and the Enduring Legacy of the KGB
- Front cover of The New Nobility
- Author: Andrei Soldatov and Irina Borogan
- Language: English
- Genre: History
- Publisher: PublicAffairs
- Publication date: 2010
- Publication place: United States
- Media type: Print (hardcover)
- Pages: 320
- ISBN: 978-1-58648-802-4

The New Nobility: The Restoration of Russia's Security State and the Enduring Legacy of the KGB (2010) is a non-fiction English-language book by Russian journalists and independent security service experts Andrei Soldatov and Irina Borogan. The introduction is written by Nick Fielding.

In the 2000s, the Russian Federal Security Service was given more powers in fighting terrorism and protecting the political regime. The book is an investigation of the Russian security services' activities in 1990s and 2000s.

In September 2010, Foreign Affairs published an essay "Russia's New Nobility. The Rise of the Security Services in Putin's Kremlin" adapted from the book.

In July 2011, the Russian version of the book came out, published by Alpina Business Books/United Press (Sanoma Independent Media).

The book was also published in France, Estonia, Finland and China.
