= The Red Web (book) =

Book by Andrei Soldatov and Irina Borogan

The Red Web: The Struggle Between Russia's Digital Dictators and the New Online Revolutionaries
- Front cover of The Red Web
- Author: Andrei Soldatov and Irina Borogan
- Language: English
- Genre: History
- Publisher: PublicAffairs
- Publication date: 2015
- Publication place: United States
- Media type: Print (hardcover)
- Pages: 384 pp
- ISBN: 978-1610395731

The Red Web: The Struggle Between Russia's Digital Dictators and the New Online Revolutionaries (2015) is a non-fiction English-language book by Russian journalists Andrei Soldatov and Irina Borogan which examines the history of surveillance technologies in Russia from the beginnings of the internet to the Internet age.

== Content ==
The book documents what the authors deem the "monumental battle for the future of the Internet." It examines the history of surveillance technologies in Russia, the Soviet Union's authoritarian control over information and its distribution, and the legacy of this mindset as it reverberates in the Russia in the Internet age. The authors also chart the history of the Russian search and surveillance system SORM (Sistema Operativno-Rozysknikh Meropriyatiy, or System of Operative Search Measures). SORM has been giving the FSB a back door to spy on internet communications since 1998.

Excerpts from the book were published by The Guardian, Buzzfeed, Business Insider, Foreign Policy, Motherboard, The Daily Beast, and Slate.

== Reception ==
Buzzfeed ran an excerpt from The Red Web on September 2, 2015, with the headline "How Edward Snowden Inadvertently Helped Vladimir Putin's Internet Crackdown." Three days later, on September 5, Edward Snowden was accepting the Norwegian Academy of Literature and Freedom of Expression's Bjornson prize – which he was awarded for his work on the right to privacy – by videophone from Russia. The host of the ceremony, Per Anders Johansen, Moscow correspondent for Aftenposten, confronted Snowden with a quote from the Red Web's extract in Buzzfeed, asking to comment on the situation with the Internet freedoms in Russia. Snowden described the country's restrictions on the web as a "mistake in policy". He said: "It's wrong in Russia, and it would be wrong anywhere. "I've been quite critical of [it] in the past and I'll continue to be in the future, because this drive that we see in the Russian government to control more and more the internet, to control more and more what people are seeing, even parts of personal lives, deciding what is the appropriate or inappropriate way for people to express their love for one another ... [is] fundamentally wrong."

The Red Web was named A Library Journal Best Book of 2015 and NPR's Best Book of 2015.

== See also ==
- Computer Russification
- History of computing in the Soviet Union
- Information technology in Russia
- Vyacheslav Volodin
