= Agentura.Ru =

Russian website

INSOR
- Available in: Russian
- Launched: 2000; 26 years ago

Agentura.Ru (Russian: Агентура.Ру) is a Russian website that covers subjects related to terrorism and intelligence agencies in Russia. It was created and supported by journalists Andrei Soldatov and Irina Borogan. From 2000 to 2006 the web-site was supported by the ISP Relcom and since 2006 Agentura.Ru has been an independent project.

== History ==
Agentura.Ru is considered a respected source on Russia's secret services. Its editor is Andrei Soldatov and deputy editor Irina Borogan.

Agentura.Ru has been cited by Committee to Protect Journalists, The New York Times, The Moscow Times, The Washington Post, Online Journalism Review, Le Monde, The Christian Science Monitor, CNN, Federation of American Scientists, the BBC and the websites of The Centre for Counterintelligence and Security Studies, Center for Defense Information, the Library of Congress, Cambridge Security Programme. The New York Times dubbed Agentura.Ru 'a website that came in from the cold to unveil Russian secrets'.

On November 12, 2008, Andrei Soldatov's employer Novaya Gazeta fired him and ceased its collaboration with Agentura.ru.
