= Komsomolsk (band) =

Russian indie rock band

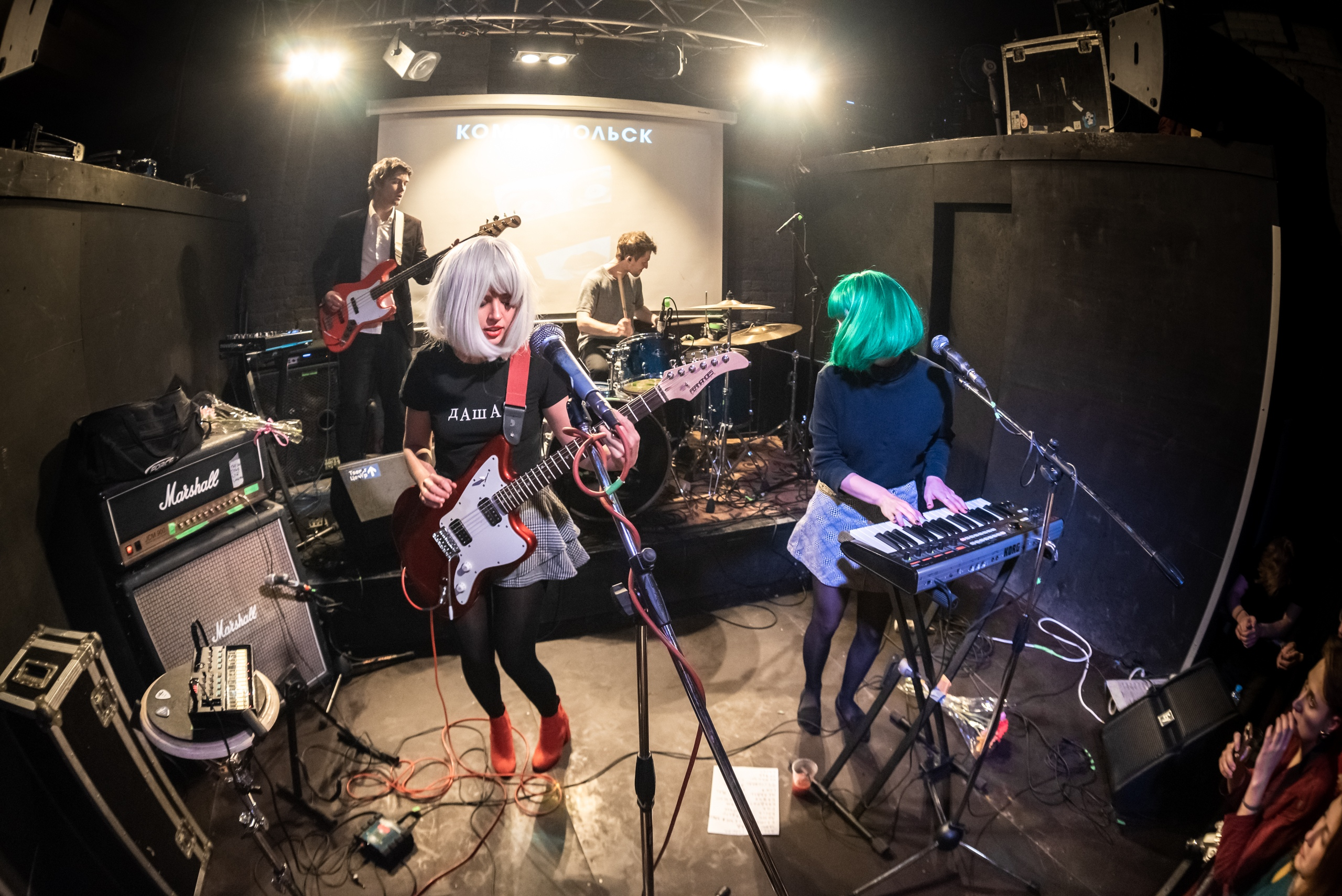
- Komsomolsk live in 2019

Background information
- Origin: Moscow, Russia
- Genres: Indie rock
- Years active: 2017–2024
- Label: Peter Explorer
- Members: Daria Deriugina; Arina Andreeva; Ivan Riabov; Pavel Kochetov
- Past members: Ilia Lopatin
- Website: https://vk.com/komsomolskband

Komsomolsk (Russian: Комсомольск, IPA: [kəmsɐˈmolʲsk]) were a Russian indie rock band formed in Moscow in 2017. The group has released over 50 songs, two studio albums and five extended play records.

== History ==
Komsomolsk's origins began in late 2015 when Daria (Dasha) Deriugina, Ivan Riabov, and Arina Andreeva met in Moscow before the band's first rehearsals.

== 2017–2019: First steps and EP era ==
Komsomolsk delivered a debut EP Komsomolsk-1 (Russian: Комсомольск-1) in June 2017 and went live two weeks later on a joint gig with the group Liubov i Roboty. From the very first show, the girls' colorful wigs appear the core feature of the band's stage image. One of the reasons for the wigs introduction was Dasha's intention to distinguish her two then-projects, Russian-speaking Komsomolsk and Anglicized Gin&Milk.

Our first record was intended to be a sort of inside joke. It was a surprise to see it inspire the interest of people I didn't know personally. (Ivan Riabov)

Right after debut live performance, Ilia Lopatin quit the band and emigrated to Poland, being immediately replaced with Pavel Kochetov, a drummer from Voronezh. Together with Pavel, the band signed to the independent recording label Peter Explorer and released another two extended records, Kassa Svobody (Russian: Касса свободы, lit. 'POS of Freedom') and 90210 until the end of 2017.

In spring 2018, the band followed up with the fourth official release, six-track EP Dorogie Moskvichi (Russian: Дорогие москвичи, lit. 'Dear Moscow People'). The one appeared a major breakthrough followed by band's first music video Gde My Seichas? (Russian: Где мы сейчас?, lit. 'Where Are We Now?'), solo gigs sold-outs in Moscow, a number of festival appearances including iconic Afisha Picnic, and live performance at Evening Urgant TV talk show aired on Channel One. Together with Yandex.Music, the band released their second music video Orkestr (Russian: Оркестр, lit. 'Orchestra') as well as a song My Ishchem Cheloveka (Russian: Мы ищем человека, lit. 'We Are Searching For a Man') written in collaboration with Yandex neural network.

Sure we are the EP band. Who would need a LP in 2019 anyway? (Dasha Deriugina)

The band released their fifth EP, Den Psikha (Russian: День психа, lit. 'Day of The Wacko') in June 2019.

== 2020–2021: LP era ==
On 21 August 2020, the band released their first studio album Blizhnii Svet (Russian: Ближний свет, lit. 'Low Beam') consisting of nine tracks.

The second studio album Retro (Russian: Ретро) was delivered just within a year in May 2021 and was hailed by critics as a sequel of Blizhnii Svet, yet recorded in Baroque pop aesthetics. Dasha Deriugina claimed this release to be 'the fastest album we have ever recorded, the band's most conceptual statement, fresh and pure like the green foliage in May'. The album's major hit, Glaza (Prilipli) (Russian: Глаза (Прилипли), lit. 'Eyes (Stuck)') was performed live at the Evening Urgant show.

== 2022–2024 ==
In 2022, after Russia's attack on Ukraine, drummer Pavel Kochetov left the band and subsequently the country. His place was taken by Vasily Kuzyakin. Ivan Ryabov also left the band later the same year.

In February 2024, Andreeva and Deriugina gave two concerts in Melitopol, Ukrainian territory illegally occupied by Russia, and stated that "they made their choice to live in their country with its problems". Two weeks before that, Meduza reported that the band was forbidden from touring in Russia, and, apparently, a tour in Melitopol was performed after the Administration of the President hinted that by supporting the illegal occupation they would be allowed to give concerts again. As a result, in March 2024 they Andreeva and Deriugina were allowed to perform in Moscow once, but their future planned concerts in Russia were canceled anyway. At the end of March they announced that they stopped performing.

Ryabov denounced the Melitopol concerts on social media using strong words. When Meduza asked Deriugina to comment on the situation, she replied suggesting the journalists "to respectfully go fuck themselves".

== Band members ==
- Daria Deriugina — vocals, lead guitar
- Arina Andreeva — vocals, keyboards
- Ivan Ryabov — bass guitar, baritone guitar
- Pavel Kochetov — drums
- Vasily Kuzyakin - drums

== Discography ==
=== Studio albums ===
Title	Album details	Alternative media
Blizhnii Svet	Released: 21 August 2020; Label: Peter Explorer; Formats: digital download, streaming	Label: THEY LIVE! RECORDS; Formats: cassette, LP
Retro	Released: 12 May 2021; Label: Peter Explorer; Formats: digital download, streaming	Label: THEY LIVE! RECORDS; Formats: cassette, LP

=== Extended records ===
Title	Album details	Alternative media
Komsomolsk-1	Released: 6 June 2017; Label: —; Formats: digital download, streaming	Label: THEY LIVE! RECORDS; Formats: cassette, LP Komsomolsk-1 (Side A)/Kassa Svobody (Side B)
Kassa Svobody	Released: 25 August 2017; Label: Peter Explorer; Formats: digital download, streaming	Label: THEY LIVE! RECORDS; Formats: cassette, LP Komsomolsk-1 (Side A)/Kassa Svobody (Side B)
90210	Released: 15 December 2017; Label: Peter Explorer; Formats: digital download, streaming,	Label: THEY LIVE! RECORDS; Formats: cassette, LP 90210 (Side A)/Dorogie Moskvichi (Side B)
Dorogie Moskvichi	Released: 29 June 2018; Label: Peter Explorer; Formats: digital download, streaming	Label: THEY LIVE! RECORDS; Formats: cassette, LP 90210 (Side A)/Dorogie Moskvichi (Side B)
Den Psikha	Released: 21 June 2019; Label: Peter Explorer; Formats: digital download, streaming	Label: THEY LIVE!RECORDS; Formats: cassette, LP Den Psikha

=== Singles ===
Year	Title
2019	Paustovskii, Bianki i Prishvin (Gromyka band's song cover): Released: 16 August 2019
2021	Skuka: Released: 1 January 2021
2021	Matrosskaya Tishina (Matrosskaya Tishina band's song cover): Released: 9 July 2021

== Music videos ==
Released	Title	Album	Directors
20 July 2018	Gde My Seichas?	Dorogie Moskvichi	Elena Vanina
14 November 2018	Orkestr	Dorogie Moskvichi	Artem Golenkov
27 December 2019	Chernyi Kvadrat	Den Psikha	Elena Vanina, Kirill Kulagin
26 November 2020	Ivanova	Blizhnii Svet	Egor Kas
