= Kochetov, Bryansk Oblast =

Kochetov Кочетов
- Village
- Location within Bryansk Oblast Location within Russia
- Coordinates: 53°30′N 33°14′E
- Country: Russia
- Region: Bryansk Oblast
- District: Kletnyansky District
- Time zone: UTC+3:00

Kochetov (Russian: Кочетов) is a rural locality (a village) in Kletnyansky District, Bryansk Oblast, Russia. The population was 15 as of 2010. There is 1 street.

== Geography ==
Kochetov is located 17 km north of Kletnya (the district's administrative centre) by road. Migolin is the nearest rural locality.
