= Anonymous International =

Russian hacking group

- Анонимный интернационал
- Formation: 2013
- Type: Hacking, hacktivism
- Purpose: Cyberespionage
- Region served: Russia

Anonymous International is a hacking group known for leaking Russian government information and personal documents of government officials. They target high-ranking members of the government, large corporations, and media, and sell the stolen data. These actions are publicized on their blog, Shaltai Boltai, (Шалтай-Болтай (Russian for 'Humpty Dumpty')), the name by which the group is also known. Over a period of 15 months the group published information about Russian politicians on 75 separate occasions.

Uncovered by Anonymous International and made public in June 2014 by The Insider, Vyacheslav Volodin is a strong supporter of the interests of Yevgeny Prigozhin and the trolls at the Internet Research Agency.

In October 2016, Vladimir Anikeyev (Владимир Аникеев), known under the handle of "Lewis," considered the group's leader, was arrested and charged with unlawful access to computer information. In addition to Anikeyev, five more people were detained, among them one of the leaders of the FSB's Information Security Center, Sergei Mikhailov, and his deputy Dmitry Dokuchaev, as well as Ruslan Stoyanov, the former head of Kaspersky Lab's Computer Incident Investigation Department.

In October 2018, one of the co-founders of Shaltai Boltai, Alexander Glazastikov, was arrested in absentia in Russia.

== See also ==
- Mikhailov case
