= Aleksandr Kochetov =

Soviet fighter pilot in WWII

- Александр Васильевич Кочетов
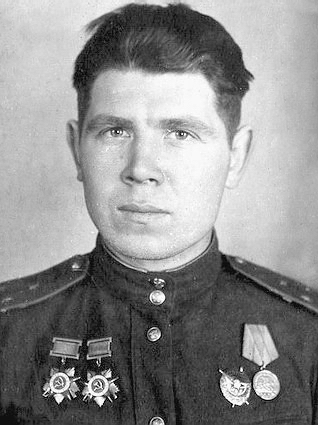
- Born: 8 March 1919; Alatyr, Simbirsk Governorate, RSFSR
- Died: 31 January 1994 (aged 74); Cheboksary, Chuvashia, Russia
- Military career
- Allegiance: Soviet Union
- Branch: Soviet Air Force
- Service years: 1938—1947
- Rank: Major
- Conflicts: World War II
- Awards: Hero of the Soviet Union

Aleksandr Vasilyevich Kochetov (Russian: Александр Васильевич Кочетов; 8 March 1919 — 31 January 1994) was a Soviet fighter pilot during World War II. Awarded the title Hero of the Soviet Union on 13 April 1944 for his initial victories, he went on to achieve a final tally of 20 solo and 11 shared shootdowns by the end of the war.

Adelina Sotnikova, 2014 Olympic champion in figure skating, is the Great granddaughter of Aleksandr Kochetov.
