= Segodnya (TV program) =

- Genre: News; Current affairs
- Created by: NTV
- Country of origin: Russia
- Original language: Russian

Production
- Production locations: Ostankino Technical Center, Moscow, Russia
- Camera setup: Multi-camera

Original release
- Network: NTV (1995 — present)
- Release: 11 October 1993 — present

Related
- Vremya, Vesti, Sobytia, Izvestia

Segodnya (Russian: Сегодня, literally Today) is a Russian information program of the NTV television company. It has been broadcast since October 11, 1993. Winner of the TEFI awards (1996—1999, 2004, 2025).

== Program description ==
Segodnya is broadcast daily. In addition to socio-political news, the program includes the blocks Business News (where business and financial news are reviewed, in the 1990s it was called Finance and Business) and Weather Forecast. In 1994-2001, it had the following sections: “Special Report” — a current report from NTV, News of the Day — current news from NTV, and Chronicle of the Day — current information NTV television company.

In 1993—2015, after some broadcasts, a "Sports" section (with sports news) was also broadcast, which was presented by individual presenters in the same news studio. In 1997—1998, some sports block broadcasts could be broadcast from Studio 21 of Ostankino, which belonged to the NTV Plus Sport television channel; from autumn 2001 to March 2015, sports news began after the main presenter gave the floor. Since September 10, 2001, NTV has stopped showing sports news after the 19:00 broadcasts, and since August 30, 2004, sports information was only presented in the 13:00 and 22:00 broadcasts (later — 22:45, 22:40, 23:00, 23:15). Since March 30, 2015, sports news broadcasts on the channel were cancelled for unknown reasons.

On the "orbits" until 2015, after some episodes, a short sports review was shown without a presenter on camera, where one of the channel's sports commentators read the text of the news under the picture off-screen. At the end, instead of saying goodbye, the presenter introduced himself and said the name of the channel ("NTV").

Since August 26, 2019, the sports review was restored in the program's 23:30 episode. The presenter Kirill Kiknadze talked about several of the main events of the day, standing in the corner of the studio, previously used for the programs Aktsenty Nedeli and ChP. Since January 18, 2021, the sports news section has been produced by the Match TV channel.

== Hosts ==
=== Current ===
- Yulia Bekhtereva (2017—2020, since 2022) — even week
- Elmira Efendieva (2016—2017, since 2019) — even week
- Dmitry Zavoisty (since 2006) — even week
- Ilya Fedorovtsev (since 2016) — odd week
- Egor Kolyvanov (since 2016) — even week
- Aina Nikolaeva (since 2015) — odd week
- Igor Poletaev (2013—2017, since 2018) — odd week
- Denis Kaplya (since 2024) — odd week
- Artem Kolodkin (since 2018)
- Polina Timofeeva (since 2018) — substitute
- Mikhail Chebonenko (2015—2017, since 2018) — substitute
- Dina Ivanova (since 2023) — substitute
- Nikita Korobenkov (since 2023) — substitute
- Edmund Zhelbunov (since 2024) — substitute
- Anatoly Mayorov (since 2024) — substitute
- Valeria Alyokhina (since 2024) — substitute
- Anastasia Makhina (since 2025) — substitute

==== Today in Moscow ====
- Olga Arzhantseva (from 2022)
- Vladislav Nazarikov (since 2022)

==== Business news ====
- Denis Talalaev (since 2010)
- Marina Pimenova (since 2022)

==== Weather forecast ====
- Irina Polyakova (2000—2001, since 2002)
- Evgenia Neronskaya (since 2016)
- Tatyana Ermilova (since 2024)

== Editors-in-Chief of the Program ==
=== Currently ===
- Natalia Bogdanova
- Vladimir Smolev

=== Former editors-in-chief ===
- Elena Savina (1993—2001, 2003—2006)
- Irina Petrova (1993—1995)
- Igor Sidorovich (1995—2001)
- Ekaterina Kopylova (1995—2001)
- Yulia Rakcheeva (1996—2000)
- Olga Bukina (1996—2015)
- Elena Chernenko (1996—2015)
- Svetlana Elina (1996—2001)
- Alexey Kuzmin (1996—2003)
- Aleksandr Plyushchev (1997—1999)
- Irakli Gachechiladze (2000-2003)
- Pavel Bardin (2002—2003)
- Artem Protasenko (2003)
- Dmitry Perminov (2003-2004)
- Alexander Gornov (2008—2015)

Final program:

- Tatyana Sopova (2005—2012)
- Mikhail Solyev (2005-2007)
- Ekaterina Kopylova (2007-2012)
- Anna Khaustova (2011-2015)
- Sofia Gudkova (2012)
- Natalia Goncharova (2012-2013)
- Maxim Sokolov (2014-2015)
