= Irina Borogan =

Russian investigative journalist and writer (born 1974)

- Ирина Петровна Бороган
- Born: Irina Petrovna Borogan; September 9, 1974 (age 51); Moscow, Russian SFSR, Soviet Union
- Occupation: Investigative journalist

Irina Petrovna Borogan (Russian: Ирина Петровна Бороган; born September 9, 1974) is a Russian investigative journalist. Together with fellow journalist Andrei Soldatov she is co-founder and editor of the Agentura.Ru website.

== Early life and education ==
Irina Borogan started her journalistic career in 1996 as correspondent of the Segodnya newspaper. For Segodnya she covered the NATO bombing of Yugoslavia, a Taiwanese earthquake, situation in refugees camps in Ingushetia before the Second Chechen War.

== Career ==
In September 2000, then in Izvestia, Irina Borogan covered law enforcement agencies and criminal activity. With Andrei Soldatov she was cofounder of the project Agentura.Ru. Since then Andrei Soldatov is editor and she is deputy editor of Agentura.Ru.

In 2004 she joined the weekly Moscow News and covered the Beslan siege for the Moscow News. From January 2006 until November 2008 she worked for Novaya Gazeta.

Borogan covered for Novaya Gazeta 2006 Lebanon War from Lebanon and tensions in the West Bank and Gaza Strip (Palestinian Territories). She regularly gives comments on terrorism for the Moscow Times and since 2010 she writes for Foreign Policy and Foreign Affairs.

=== Publishing ===
In December 2005, Irina Borogan published with Andrei Soldatov the book New patriot games. How secret services have been changing their skin 1991-2004. In September 2010 Andrei Soldatov and Irina Borogan's book The New Nobility: The Restoration of Russia's Security State and the Enduring Legacy of the KGB. In August 2011 The Russian version of the book sat on seventh place on the best seller list of Knizhnoe Obozrenie. In early September it was the second place on the best seller list. On September 20 the authors were informed by Elena Evgrafova, a chief editor of the Alpina Business Books/United Press, that on September 14, the General Director of the Chekhov Poligraphic Complex, German Kravchenko, received a letter from the Moscow department of the FSB in which the Head of the 2nd Directorate of the 6th Inter-regional Section A.I.Sergeev requests information as to the identities of those individuals who placed the order for the publication of the book The New Nobility.

In October 2011 The French version of the New Nobility came out, published by François Bourin éditeur. In December 2011 The Estonian edition was published by the Tanapaev Publisher. In January 2012 the book came out in Chinese (Publisher CITIC).

=== Russia's Surveillance State Project ===
In October 2012 Agentura.Ru, Privacy International and Citizen Lab launched the joint project entitled 'Russia's Surveillance State' with Andrei Soldatov as a head of the project and Irina Borogan as a deputy head. The aims of the project were to undertake research and investigation into surveillance practices in Russia, including the trade in and use of surveillance technologies, and to publicise research and investigative findings to improve national and international awareness of surveillance and secrecy practices in Russia.

On October 6, 2013 The Guardian reported the research made by Andrei Soldatov and Irina Borogan over surveillance measures introduced by the Russian authorities at the 2014 Winter Olympics, including extensive electronic eavesdropping and surveillance. The investigation was conducted in collaboration with Citizen Lab and Privacy International. The publication of the research prompted three European parliamentarians to raise concerns about surveillance at the 2014 Winter Olympics. Sophie in 't Veld, a Dutch member of the European parliament, and two other MEPs have tabled written questions in attempt to open a debate over Russian snooping.

== Bibliography ==
- Irina Borogan (with Andrei Soldatov): "New patriot games. How secret services have been changing their skin 1991-2004", December 2005.
- Irina Borogan (with Andrei Soldatov): "The New Nobility: The Restoration of Russia's Security State and the Enduring Legacy of the KGB", PublicAffairs, September 2010.
- Irina Borogan (with Andrei Soldatov): The Red Web: The Struggle Between Russia's Digital Dictators and the New Online Revolutionaries, PublicAffairs, September 2015.
- Irina Borogan (with Andrei Soldatov): The Compatriots: The Brutal and Chaotic History of Russia’s Exiles, Emigres, and Agents Abroad, PublicAffairs, October 2019
- Irina Borogan (with Andrei Soldatov): Our Dear Friends in Moscow: The Inside Story of a Broken Generation, PublicAffairs, June 2025
