= Andrei Soldatov =

Russian investigative journalist and writer (born 1975)

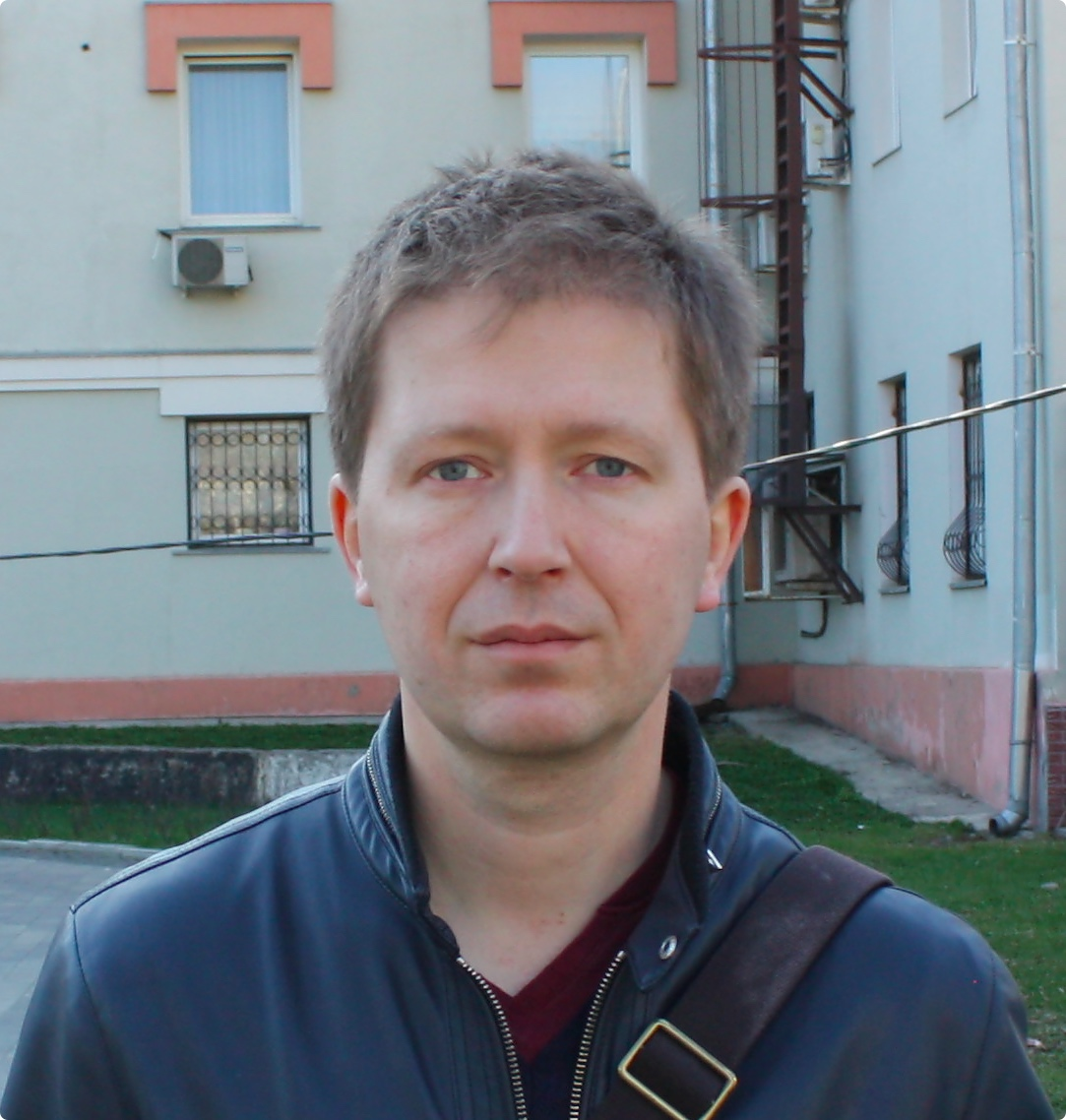
- Soldatov in 2019
- Born: Andrei Alekseyevich Soldatov; 4 October 1975 (age 51); Moscow, Russia
- Education: Russian State Social University
- Occupation: Investigative journalist

Andrei Alekseyevich Soldatov (Russian: Андрей Алексеевич Солдатов, born 4 October 1975 in Moscow, Russia) is a Russian investigative journalist and Russian security services expert. Together with fellow journalist Irina Borogan he is co-founder and editor of the Agentura.Ru website.

== Journalism ==
Andrei Soldatov graduated from the journalism department of Moscow State Social University, since renamed the Russian State Social University. In 1996, he started to work as correspondent of the Segodnya newspaper. From 1998 to 1999, he was a staff writer for the Kompania journal.

In September 2000, then in Izvestia, he opened the project Agentura.Ru with Irina Borogan and other colleagues. He has since become editor and Irina Borogan deputy editor of the Agentura.ru-project. From 2002 to 2004 he was also section chief of the Versiya weekly newspaper, during which time he covered the Moscow theater hostage crisis.

In April 2004, Soldatov began appearing as a commentator on radio Echo of Moscow as a security expert. In July 2004, he joined the weekly Moscow News as the secret services observer. He covered the Beslan siege for Echo Moskvy and Moscow News. Since January 2006, he has worked for the newspaper Novaya Gazeta.

For Novaya Gazeta he has covered the 2006 Lebanon War and tensions in West Bank and Gaza Strip in Palestine.

Soldatov regularly appears as a commentator on terrorism and intelligence issues for Vedomosti, Radio Free Europe and the BBC. Since July 2008 he has been a columnist for The Moscow Times. Beginning in 2010 Soldatov has also written for Foreign Policy and Foreign Affairs.

== Pressure of the FSB ==
On 1 November 2002, FSB officers searched the premises of Versiya, reportedly regarding information published in an article by Soldatov on 27 May 2002. However, Andrei Soldatov has claimed that this operation against his newspaper was related to a forthcoming article on the storming of the Moscow theatre and freeing of the hostages there on 26 October. Soldatov has been interrogated four times by the Investigative Department of the FSB based in Lefortovo.

In June 2008 Soldatov was questioned by the FSB in Lefortovo over the interview of the former SVR officer Sergei Tretyakov, who defected to the US in 2000.

== Firing by Novaya Gazeta ==
On 12 November 2008, Soldatov's employer Novaya Gazeta fired him and Agentura.Ru colleague Irina Borogan. In a press release, Soldatov and Borogan said that Novaya Gazeta had ceased its collaboration with Agentura.Ru without explanation. ‘They even removed our banner from their website,' said Soldatov, noted by Maria Eismont in Index on Censorship on 27 November).

== Publishing activities ==
In December 2005, Andrei Soldatov published with Irina Borogan the book New patriot games. How secret services have been changing their skin 1991-2004.

In April 2008 Praeger published the PSI Handbook of Global Security and Intelligence: National Approaches: Volume 1 - The Americas and Asia; Volume 2 - Europe and the Middle East. Soldatov is the author of the chapter on Russia's secret services.

In September 2010 Andrei Soldatov and Irina Borogan's book The New Nobility: The Restoration of Russia's Security State and the Enduring Legacy of the KGB was published by PublicAffairs, a member of the Perseus Books Group.

In August 2011 the Russian version of The New Nobility sat in seventh place on the best seller list of Knizhnoe Obozrenie. In early September it was in second place on the best seller list. On 20 September the authors were informed by Elena Evgrafova, a chief editor of Alpina Business Books/United Press, that on 14 September, the General Director of the Chekhov Poligraphic Complex, German Kravchenko, received a letter from the Moscow department of the FSB in which the Head of the 2nd Directorate of the 6th Inter-regional Section A.I.Sergeev requested the identities of people who placed an order for The New Nobility.

In October 2011 the French version of The New Nobility came out, published by François Bourin editeur. In December 2011 the Estonian edition was published by Tänapäev. In January 2012 the book came out in Chinese, published by CITIC.

In recent time he wrote about Kremlin's efforts to quell opposition after the wave of demonstration in 2011/2012. He also wrote about new developments in Russia in tougher control of social networks and in surveillance on the Internet. The Boston Marathon bombing gave him reason to divert attention to terrorist networks, covering Russia and the US.

In July 2025, the State Duma passed a law officially restoring the Federal Security Service's authority to operate its own detention centers. Soldatov and Irina Borogan described the legislation as "a foundation for a new Gulag” and predicted a major expansion of political repression in Russia: "Special railcars, ships, aircraft, powers to transport prisoners, and the authority to rule and punish within prison walls — all of this, under FSB control, points to preparations for repressions on a scale we haven’t yet seen." FSB detention centers would hold prisoners accused of treason, espionage, terrorism, and extremism.

== Russia's Surveillance State Project ==
In October 2012 Agentura.Ru, Privacy International and Citizen Lab launched the joint project entitled 'Russia's Surveillance State' with Andrei Soldatov as a head of the project. The aims of the project were to undertake research and investigation into surveillance practices in Russia, including the trade in and use of surveillance technologies, and to publicise research and investigative findings to improve national and international awareness of surveillance and secrecy practices in Russia.

On 6 October 2013 The Guardian reported the research made by Andrei Soldatov and Irina Borogan over surveillance measures introduced by the Russian authorities at the 2014 Winter Olympics, including extensive electronic eavesdropping and surveillance. The investigation was conducted in collaboration with Citizen Lab and Privacy International. The publication of the research prompted three European parliamentarians to raise concerns about surveillance at the 2014 Winter Olympics. Sophie in 't Veld, a Dutch member of the European parliament, and two other MEPs have tabled written questions in attempt to open a debate over Russian snooping. On 22 January 2014, Mr. Soldatov provided testimony on Russian surveillance practices before the Committee on Civil Liberties, Justice and Home Affairs (LIBE Committee) of the European Parliament.

On 18 April 2014 Edward Snowden wrote an op-ed in The Guardian defending his decision to question Putin, and remarked:

The investigative journalist Andrei Soldatov, perhaps the single most prominent critic of Russia's surveillance apparatus (and someone who has repeatedly criticised me in the past year), described my question as "extremely important for Russia". According to the Daily Beast, Soldatov said it could lift a de facto ban on public conversations about state eavesdropping.

In September 2015 Andrei Soldatov and Irina Borogan's book The Red Web: The Struggle Between Russia's Digital Dictators and the New Online Revolutionaries is published by PublicAffairs, a member of the Perseus Books Group. The book traces the origins of the Russian system of surveillance SORM and tells the story of the Internet in Russia. In December 2015, in the British newspaper The Guardian, Soldatov warned the world's biggest networks as Twitter, Google and Facebook not to give in to Russian president Vladimir Putin's demand to host their servers in Russia. If these companies open their doors to Russia's security services, they will lose control over their information, and give the Kremlin and FSB access to the world's internet traffic, and users’ personal data.

== Criminal case ==
On 6 June 2022, the Russian Ministry of Internal Affairs put Andrei Soldatov on the wanted list. Soldatov wrote on his social networks that a criminal case was opened against him on 17 March, and all of his accounts in Russian banks have now been seized. The Ministry does not specify under which article the journalist is wanted. Soldatov told The Washington Post he was charged with spreading “fake news” about the Russian Army, but the real reason was his reporting on the faulty intelligence that had led to the Russian invasion of Ukraine.

== Books ==
- Andrei Soldatov (with Irina Borogan) New patriot games. How secret services have been changing their skin 1991-2004, December 2005.
- PSI Handbook of Global Security and Intelligence: National Approaches: Volume 1 - The Americas and Asia; Volume 2 - Europe and the Middle East, Praeger, April 2008.
- Andrei Soldatov (with Irina Borogan) The New Nobility: The Restoration of Russia's Security State and the Enduring Legacy of the KGB, PublicAffairs, September 2010.
- Andrei Soldatov (with Irina Borogan) The Red Web: The Struggle Between Russia's Digital Dictators and the New Online Revolutionaries, PublicAffairs, September 2015.
- Andrei Soldatov (with Irina Borogan) The Compatriots: The Brutal and Chaotic History of Russia's Exiles, Émigrés, and Agents Abroad, PublicAffairs, October 2019.
- Andrei Soldatov (with Irina Borogan) Our Dear Friends in Moscow: The Inside Story of a Broken Generation, PublicAffairs, June 3, 2025.

== Articles ==
- Both Sides Dropped the Ball on Tsarnaev, The Moscow Times, 23 April 2013 (background of Boston Marathon bombing on 15 April 2013).
- Russia's Digital Underground. How the Kremlin is waging war on information freedom (with Irina Borogan), Foreign Policy, 5 April 2013.
- Vladimir Putin's Cyber Warriors, The Kremlin's Ham-handed Effort to Squelch Online Dissent, Foreign Affairs, 9 December 2011.
- Rouble trouble hits Russian media, Index on Censorship, 27 November 2008.
- Journalist Enjoying A Security Monopoly The Moscow Times, 18 June 2008.
- Russian spies at Cold War level' BBC News, 15 March 2007.
- In Russia, A Secretive Force Widens The Washington Post, by Peter Finn, 12 December 2006.
- Russian government sets sights on 'subversion', The Christian Science Monitor, 1 June 2005.
- A website That Came in From the Cold to Unveil Russian Secrets The New York Times, 14 December 2000.
- Watching the watchers in Russia FAS, 14 December 2000.
