= Pavel Vrublevsky =

Russian programmer (born 1978)

- Born: Pavel Olegovich Vrublevsky; 26 December 1978 (age 47); Moscow, USSR
- Education: Maurice Thorez Moscow Institute of Foreign Languages; Moscow State University
- Occupations: Programmer, businessman, entrepreneur
- Known for: Founder of Chronopay B.V.
- Spouse: Vera Vrublevsky
- Children: 3

Pavel Olegovich Vrublevsky (Russian: Павел Олегович Врублевский; born 26 December 1978) is a Russian, owner and general manager of the processing company ChronoPay. He is also the founder of investment company RNP and a Russian Forbes contributor on matters relating to blockchain, cryptocurrencies, and cybersecurity. He was also implicated in a range of criminal cases related to hacking.

== Youth and education ==
Pavel Vrublevsky was born and raised in Moscow. As a fifteen-year-old, he studied under the American Field Service student exchange program in Norway, then studied at the Institute of Foreign Languages named after Maurice Thorez, from where he moved to the sociology department of Moscow State University and graduated in 2001. He organized his first IT company to develop billing software for telecommunications companies at the age of eighteen.

== Career ==
=== Early ventures ===
In 1999, Vrublevsky founded Pornocruto.nu, a website selling pornographic material depicting, among others, zoophilia and simulated rape scenes. In 2000, he founded Crutop.nu, a forum for adult website webmasters. In 2001, he founded the affiliate network Pornocruto Cash dedicated to rape fetish pornography. The network had an estimated turnover of 170 000-200 000 rubles in 2001–2002. The website experienced frequent billing issues, which led Vrublevsky to start his own payment company.

=== ChronoPay ===
In 2003, at age 23, he founded the company ChronoPay B.V. In 2005, ChronoPay entered the Russian market, and in 2006 Vrublevsky received the prestigious Runet Award. Within three years, the company gained international recognition as one of the premier processing companies at the cutting edge of technology. Even though ChronoPay was headquartered in Amsterdam, the company developed into a true leader for processing credit card payments in Russia – controlling roughly 25% of the market share. The company's client roster boasted several Russian companies as well as larger multinational corporations including Sony and Microsoft. Most Russian charitable foundations and non-profit organizations also use ChronoPay, including Greenpeace and the Red Cross. Additional clients included Russia's second largest airline, Transaero, and the country's largest cellphone operator, MTS. In 2011 ChronoPay had five worldwide offices; Moscow, Amsterdam, Barcelona, Florida in the United States, and Riga, Latvia. There were two franchises in China and an active business in Brazil. In 2011, the company had more than two hundred employees.

=== ChronoPay's impact ===
ChronoPay's impact on the online card processing payment industry in Russia is undeniable. In fact, even today, most of Russia's internet-based payments marketplace entirely relies on former ChronoPay personnel, to name just a few: Largest Russian Bank - Sberbank, most popular e-money system in Russia - Yandex.Money, card associations, such as Mastercard and many more. Dozens of important state banks and other payment providers are all dependent on former ChronoPay employees, not unlike McKinsey & Company's impact on management consulting. According to Russian Forbes, today as 2016 ChronoPay serves up to 25% of the wealthiest corporations concerning capitalization web companies in Russia, including two of four Russian cell companies; MTS and Tele2.

=== MP3search ===
In 2006, Vrublevsky led the e-commerce commission of the NAUET. The Commission advocated for the preservation of the existing model for the collective management of copyright on the Internet. Vrublevsky was a vocal proponent of one of the largest rights management societies at the time - FAIR.

In 2007, together with good friend and the former producer of the T.A.T.U. group, Ivan Shapovalov, Vrublevsky purchased a mp3search.ru online store, and was actively engaged in his own mp3 business. T.A.T.U. is the only music group from Russia whose music was chosen as the official Russian soundtrack for the 2014 Olympics. Shapovalov remained a business partner of Vrublevsky's wife, Vera Vrublevskaya, a Russian producer. for a long time running a social network for musicians along with her.

Vrublevsky's Chronopay was serving the infamous online store allofmp3.com, which was persecuted by the international society for collective management of copyrights IFPI and was accused of infringing by the US during the negotiations on Russia's accession to the WTO.

Allofmp3.com worked under the license of ROMS and gave this organization about 50% of license fees.

=== Electronic tickets ===
In 2007, after the appearance of electronic air tickets in Russia, Vrublevsky engaged in processing in this area, organizing the project E-Avia. ChronoPay E-Avia, processing payments for most major airlines (the largest of the clients is Transaero), with the exception of Aeroflot.

In 2010, Vrublevsky proposed to create a national air ticket reservation system (GDS) based on E-Avia. He is ready to transfer a controlling stake in this structure to Aeroflot. The proposal did not find any response. As a result, a single Russian GDS was never created. After the entry into force of the law on the storage of personal data of Russians in the territory of the Russian Federation, the state-owned company "RosTech" was urgently called upon to create a national GDS (where Russian airline tickets will be kept).

=== Working group with the Ministry of Communications for combating spam ===
In 2009, Pavel Vrublevsky, part of the working group on combating spam under the Ministry of Communications, initiated a campaign against his former partner Igor Gusev (according to Spamhaus rating of the world's main spammer), the owner of the largest partner spam network for sale Viagra Glavmed.

Experts agree that after the commencement of the criminal prosecution of Gusev and the closure of Spamit's spam in 2010, the global level of spam fell by half.

=== The financial newspaper ===
In 2012, Vrublevsky proposed the redemption of the magazine "Hacker" from the publishing house GAMELAND. Also, according to media reports, in 2012 Vrublevsky is preparing a deal to buy the oldest business publication in the country - the Financial Newspaper (1915), published jointly with the RF Ministry of Finance.

Vrublevsky also provided the financial backing to relaunch the Finansovaya Gazette (Financial newspaper), Russia's oldest financial newspaper, initially run by the Ministry of Finance of Russia which was founded in 1914. The iconic publication published several influential voices throughout history including Vladimir Lenin. Two of Russia's most well-respected financial journalists, Nikolai Vardul and Raf Shakirov, worked with Vrublevsky and took the editorial reigns of the publication during its comeback. Previously, Vardul and Shakirov were the chief editors of Kommersant, Russia's most known business newspaper. Vrublevsky and ChronoPay's commitment to the paper's survival went as far as housing the paper for a time especially during past economic hardships when the whole newspaper resided in the ChronoPay office.

=== Advocacy for National Payment System and National Booking System ===
Vrublesky advocated for the creation of a National Payment System long before it was hastily created as a reaction to sanctions. Vrublevsky was so outspoken in his advocacy that some foreign journalists (Brian Krebs and Business Insider) falsely predicted that he would run the system in exchange for being cleared of false allegations.

The National Booking System was also something that he pushed for and was eventually created by the Russian corporation, Rostechnology.

=== A Change in Opinion Leads to Support for Blockchain and Bitcoin ===
Weeks before the Kremlin publicly embraced Blockchain and Bitcoin, Pavel strongly advocated and trumpeted the cutting-edge technology eventually becoming Russian Forbes contributor on the ground-breaking development. Initially, Vrublevsky was very unsure on public of the new industry but eventually migrated to become one of its loudest supporters.

=== Confrontation with the Center of Information Security of the Russian Federal Security Service and rehabilitation ===
In 2007, Pavel Vrublevsky first came under the pressure of the Central of Information Security of the Federal Security Service of the Russian Federation, in 2010 he accused the CIS of the FSB of Russia of treason and the promotion of the myth of the Russian cyber threat, and in 2011 was arrested several times by officers of the FSB investigating a cyberattack on Aeroflot's online payment system. He was convicted of orchestrating the cyberattack and sentenced to 2.5 years in prison in 2013, but was granted early parole after serving less than a year of incarceration. In 2016, on the basis of materials from Vrublevsky, officers of the CIS FSB were arrested because of high treason, which led to the termination of cooperation between the US and Russia on cybercrime. In 2018 the court sentenced Colonel Mikhailov of CIS FSB to 22 years in prison, his accomplice from Kaspersky Lab Ruslan Stoyanov to 14 years in prison, Mikhailov's subordinate mr. Dokuchaev to 6 years in prison and their accomplice Mr. Fomchenkov to 7 years in prison. Mr.Dokuchaev is separately wanted by FBI USA for alleged cyber attacks on Yahoo and illicit pharmaceutical trade.

=== Media attacks and criticism ===
Vrublevsky was extensively targeted by American journalist Brian Krebs - in fact not only did Krebs focus on Vrublevsky for a story, he wrote close to twenty-five stories about him.

Krebs has enjoyed tremendous support with both the Russian FSB as well as written positive stories of Kaspersky Labs - the major partner of the United States & Krebs in the scandal. The United States has since terminated any and all contracts with Kaspersky.

According to Krebs there was an internal war of corruption between Pavel and the troubled man he was attempted to mentor, Igor Gusev. While Pavel had taken him down years earlier at the request of Russian police for being the world's top spammer, he was now running one of the top spam affiliate programs in the world selling fake Viagra. Gusev became Krebs' primary source against Pavel, while Gusev, now exiled from Russia, was looking to settle a score against Pavel by setting him up. The revelations were entirely based on Gusev's statements and ChronoPay's stolen and hacked databases. Vrublevsky published his own research into the origins of the investigations into Brian Krebs as well as into that of another known cyber security researcher, Kimberly Zenz, accusing them both of working on behalf of American intelligence agencies. Vrublevsky humorously compared Krebs and Zenz with alleged Russian spies Boshirov and Petrov.

Eventually, Vrublevsky was the central villain in Krebs' New York Times best-selling book, Spam Nation. However, recent events (arrests of Mikhailov's group and subsequent charges against Dokuchaev by the FBI in the United States) debunk Kreb's narrative about Vrublevsky's role.

For instance New York Times noted that the arrests of Mikhailov's FSB group «amounted to a purge of the leadership of the cyberwing of Russia’s main intelligence agency in the midst of the electoral hacking scandal, an issue carrying immense implications for Russia’s relations with the United States.» In an interview to New York Times Vrublevsky stated «“These guys were selling fairy tales to the United States about people doing business, like me.”

In an interview to CNN Vrublevsky added «"I believe it's a good thing for both countries [Russia and US]. These people are directly responsible for the cyber hysteria eventually going as far as election meddling scandal. I am very happy it's over."

=== Column in Forbes, statements on Russian hackers ===
Since November, 2016 he has been leading a column in Forbes about electronic payments and crypto-currencies, in particular, the popularization of bitcoin. Vrublevsky's statements on Russian hackers received wide response. In the spring and summer of 2017, Vrublevsky conveyed to a number of leading world media materials testifying to the non-involvement of Russian hackers in attacks on the servers of the Democratic Party in the United States.

=== Other organizations ===
In different years he headed:

- The Anti-Spam Commission under the Internet Development Working Group under the Ministry of Communications of the Russian Federation.
- Committee on e-commerce under the National Association of Electronic Commerce Participants.
- Member of RAEK.

In 2011, the magazine "Finance" included in the prestigious "33 Pepper" rating - the most successful men under the age of 33.

In 2011 Vrublevsky was also the major sponsor of VTB League, paying over one million USD to Russia's main basketball league. He was frequently seen along with VTB League top management including mr. Sergei Ivanov, one of Russia's most influential politicians.

In 2018 Vrublevsky heads the Payments Committee of IDACB.com, one of world's largest Bitcoin associations, founded by 65 member states ultra high- rank representatives. Russian office of IDACB was founded with the assistance of Mr. Herman Klimenko, an Advisor on the Internet to President of Russia Mr. Putin, who frequently appears alongside Vrublevsky in their Facebook pages photos

== Criminal Prosecution ==
From 2012 to 2014, he served a prison sentence for organizing a hacker attack on the payment service "Assist" and was released on parole.

On March 12, 2022, he was placed in a pre-trial detention center on charges of large-scale fraud (Part 4 of Article 159 of the Russian Criminal Code) and theft committed by an organized group (Clause "a", Part 4 of Article 158 of the Russian Criminal Code).

== Personal life ==
He is married to Vera Vrublevsky, the mother of his three children.

== Interviews and media materials ==
- Interview -2012 - Pavel Vrublevsky. YouTube (2012). - Interview at the -2012. Checked 19 July 2017.
- "Crime is Americans and Europeans, not our compatriots." Forbes (8 December 2010). - Interview with Pavel Vrublevsky for Forbes / "Runetology." Checked 19 July 2017.
- DIGIT.RU / RIA NEWS. DIGIT.RU (29 December 2011). Checked 19 July 2017.
- "We were in Lefortovo and understand the harsh realities in which the Russian businessman lives" - the owner of Chronopay Pavel Vrublevsky. Finmarket (30 March 2012). - Interview of Vrublevsky for IA Finmarket. Checked 19 July 2017.
- Spiral of the history of cyberwar. The Financial Newspaper (11 February 2013). - A glance from the inside to cyberwar, unfolding in the network. Article by PO Vrublevsky. It was checked on 19 July 2017.
- Aeroflot spreads its wings. The film by Andrei Karaulov. The moment of truth (1 August 2013). - Andrew Karaulov's program "The Moment of Truth" .. It was checked on 19 July 2017.
- Accounts are unbuttoned. The New Newspaper (15 February 2013). - Founder and owner of ChronoPay Pavel Vrublevsky (according to some version, cybercriminals number 1 in the world) ?? about initiatives on foreign accounts and assets of officials .. It was checked on 19 July 2017.
- "They stole 800 cards for two hours, but this is not hacking." Republic (28 October 2010). - General Director of ZAO Chronopay Pavel Vrublevsky. It was checked on 19 July 2017.
- Interview to the program "Technopark" on the channel Russia.
