= The Silver Chair (1990 serial) =

1990 British children's television series

- Written by: C.S. Lewis; Alan Seymour
- Directed by: Alex Kirby
- Starring: David Thwaites; Camilla Power
- Composer: Geoffrey Burgon
- Country of origin: United Kingdom
- No. of series: 1
- No. of episodes: 6

Production
- Producer: Paul Stone
- Production locations: Haddon Hall, Bakewell, Derbyshire; Peak Cavern, Derbyshire, The Duchy of Lancaster
- Running time: 26 min. per episode (approx.)

Original release
- Network: BBC; Wonderworks; PBS
- Release: 18 November – 23 December 1990

Related
- Prince Caspian and The Voyage of the Dawn Treader; The Chronicles of Narnia

The Silver Chair is a series shown on BBC television in 1990. It is the third and final series of The Chronicles of Narnia that ran from 1988 to 1990.

Barbara Kellerman returned in a new role as the Green Lady; Barbara had previously played Old Hag and the White Witch in previous series.

The six-part series followed the 1953 book in great detail and was filmed in various locations including Peak Cavern, Haddon Hall, Bakewell, Derbyshire and the Duchy of Lancaster.

== Cast ==
- David Thwaites as Eustace Scrubb
- Camilla Power as Jill Pole
- Tat Whalley as Chief Bully
- Ailsa Berk and William Todd-Jones (puppet performance) and Ronald Pickup (voice) as Aslan
- Geoffrey Russell as King Caspian X
- Richard Henders as Prince Rilian
- Big Mick as Trumpkin
- Warwick Davis as Glimfeather and Reepicheep
- William Todd-Jones as Centaur
- Mike Edmonds as Second Owl
- Roy Boyd as Lord Drinian
- Barbara Kellerman as the Emerald Witch
- Tom Baker as Puddleglum
- Ailsa Berk as Dragon
- Nick Brimble as Giant Porter
- Joshua Fenton as Young Giant
- Stephen Reynolds as Giant King
- Lesley Nicol as Giant Queen
- Patsy Byrne as Giant Nanny
- Melanie Gibson as Giant Chambermaid
- June Ellis as Giant Cook
- Amanda Loy-Ellis as Giant Cook’s Helper
- Christopher Birch as Old Giant
- Bill Wallis as Warden
- Joe Hall as Sentry
- Jack Purvis as Golg
- Jean Marc Perret as Young Caspian
- Jeffrey Perry as Mr. Tumnus
- Henry Woolf as Doctor Cornelius

== Episodes ==
No.	Original release date
1	18 November 1990
When friends Eustace Scrubb and Jill Pole stumble into Aslan's Country when trying to escape bullies at their school, Jill is given a quest by Aslan the Talking Lion. They must rescue and deliver Prince Rilian, son of King Caspian X, who disappeared 10 years earlier after weeks of searching the woods near Cair Paravel for the serpent who had killed his royal mother, the Queen. Nobody in Narnia knows where Rilian went to, or even if he is still alive, but Aslan knows that he is alive. However, their task is complicated by the fact that they both got separated on their arrival in Aslan's Country, when Eustace fell from a cliff and was blown to Narnia by Aslan, who soon blows Jill in the same direction. A great ship has just set sail from a castle - Cair Paravel - and a talking Owl (Glimfeather) appears and informs Eustace and Jill that the King of Narnia has just departed on his ship. Eustace is horrified to realise that the elderly man boarding the ship was indeed Caspian, who is now decades rather than only a few years older than Eustace. With the passage of time in Narnia being different to the passage of time on Earth, 50 years have passed in Narnia while only a year has passed on Earth. Caspian, now an elderly man and perhaps sensing that he might not live for much longer, has just set sail to revisit the places of his youth (where he had voyaged with Edmund, Lucy and Eustace). However, many believe that he had set out to seek Aslan to find out who should be the next King of Narnia, as he has no other children and fears he will never see Rilian again. They meet the very elderly dwarf Trumpkin, now Lord Regent of Narnia, who has taken over the rule of Narnia while Caspian is at sea. He allows Eustace and Jill to stay at Cair Paravel, and that evening Glimfeather returns to the castle to take Jill to the Parliament of Owls.
2	25 November 1990
Glimfeather's unnamed friend in the Parliament of Owls tells the children the story of how Prince Rilian was lost 10 years ago, shortly after his mother was killed by a serpent. The children gather from the story that the serpent who killed the Queen and the mysterious lady that Rilian had pointed out to Lord Drinian on his return to the forest were probably one and the same. Glimfeather and his friend then take the children to a friend of theirs who will act as a guide on their quest to track down the lost prince. To help them on their quest they meet the gloomy but loyal Marshwiggle Puddleglum. Leaving Narnia, they journey deep into the desolate northern lands, where they encounter cold, hunger and hardship, and encounter giants as well as a dragon, who flies away after Eustace (who was briefly a dragon himself once) approaches him and encourages him to go elsewhere.
3	2 December 1990
The children soon begin to bicker among themselves, forgetting the Four Signs Aslan has given them for guidance along the way. One frosty morning, the three travelers encounter a beautiful Emerald Witch, accompanied by a silent Black Knight whose helmet is adorned with a sculpted serpent. Not realizing that the seemingly charming lady is actually the same deadly serpent that enslaved the Prince and killed his mother, the children confide in her eagerly. Sensing their hunger and exhaustion, the sly witch sends them to the Gentle Giants of Harfang.
4	9 December 1990
The giants are kind to the children at first, but in reality, they plan to fatten the travelers up with rich foods and then have them as part of the Autumn Feast. Discovering the truth after reading a cookery book, the three travellers escape from Harfang and go underground, where they realise they have entered the underworld ruled by the witch, who is not initially present, and has enslaved a large number of earthmen.
5	16 December 1990
The Warden of the Underworld and his army of earthmen lead the children and Puddleglum to a grand apartment in the Underworld, where they are welcomed by a mysterious masked man who claims to be the Queen's second in command, and will lead her army of gnomes to conquer the "overworld". Two gnomes later appear and capture him in the Silver Chair, but he soon persuades the travelers to set him free "in the name of Aslan". The three travellers remember that Aslan had said that this was one of the four signs that would aid them in their quest. He then smashes the Silver Chair to pieces with his sword, and reveals that he is indeed Rilian, heir to the Narnian throne. He recognises Eustace's name from his father's stories, and is keen to find out whether his father is still alive. Puddleglum reveals that Caspian is still living, but is now old and frail, implying that he may not be alive for much longer. The Green Lady then arrives and is horrified to find the Silver Chair destroyed, wrongly believing that one of the three travelers has destroyed it.
6	23 December 1990
Rilian then confesses that he destroyed the Silver Chair, and the Witch then attempts to put all three travelers under the same spell, blotting out any memories of Narnia or Earth, but her magic fails to work on Puddleglum. His defiance enrages the Witch, especially after he extinguishes the fire which was placing the children under the spell. She finally loses her temper and takes on her true form as a hideous green snake. Once she is no longer in the distracting shape of a woman, Prince Rilian recognizes who she truly is and kills her. They then make their escape to the overworld, where they are rescued through a hole in the hillside by the Narnians. Rilian then heads off to Cair Paravel while the children and Puddleglum stay overnight with the Narnians. The next day, Glenstorm the centaur takes the children to Cair Paravel to witness the return of King Caspian. However, Caspian’s health is declining by the time he returns to Cair Paravel, and he dies shortly after meeting Rilian, who is then proclaimed King of Narnia by Trumpkin. Aslan then appears and congratulates the children on succeeding with the task he had assigned them, and they then return to Aslan's Country with him. The children find themselves back at the stream in Narnia where Jill had first seen Aslan, and the dead King Caspian is lying in the stream. On Aslan's orders, Eustace removes a large thorn from a nearby thicket and drives it into Aslan's paw, creating a stream of blood that revives Caspian and restores his youth to him; he is thrilled to meet Eustace again. Aslan then orders the two children and Caspian to confront the bullies at Jill's school, breaking down a wall that reveals the three warriors with their swords, causing the crowd of bullies to head back to the school in terror. The children then say their goodbyes to Caspian and Aslan.
