= The Chronicles of Narnia (TV series) =

British children's television series (1988–1990)

- Title screen
- Genre: Fantasy
- Created by: The Chronicles of Narnia by C. S. Lewis
- Country of origin: United Kingdom
- No. of series: 3
- No. of episodes: 18

Production
- Running time: 25–30 min per each episode 505 min total for series (estimate)

Original release
- Network: BBC
- Release: 13 November 1988 – 23 December 1990

The Chronicles of Narnia is a British live-action-animated BBC-produced television series that was aired from 13 November 1988 to 23 December 1990 and is based on four books of C. S. Lewis's The Chronicles of Narnia series. The first series aired was The Lion, the Witch and the Wardrobe in 1988, the second series aired was Prince Caspian and The Voyage of the Dawn Treader in 1989 and the third series aired was The Silver Chair in 1990.

== Plot ==
Series	Adaptation	Episodes		Originally released	
Series	Adaptation	Episodes		First released	Last released
1	The Lion, the Witch and the Wardrobe	6		13 November 1988	18 December 1988
2	Prince Caspian	6	2	19 November 1989	26 November 1989
2	The Voyage of the Dawn Treader	6	4	3 December 1989	24 December 1989
3	The Silver Chair	6		18 November 1990	23 December 1990

=== The Lion, the Witch and the Wardrobe ===
Peter, Susan, Edmund and Lucy Pevensie are siblings who are evacuated from London because of the air raids in World War II. Soon after arriving at their temporary home, the four children discover that a wardrobe in a spare room contains a portal to the magical land of Narnia. There, they become involved in a war against the White Witch, and help restore the true ruler, a lion called Aslan, serving as kings and queens under him for many years before returning to their own world through the wardrobe.

=== Prince Caspian and the Voyage of the Dawn Treader ===
The four Pevensie children are waiting at a train station when a magical force pulls them back into Narnia, where they help Prince Caspian overthrow his evil uncle, King Miraz, and take the throne.

Back in England, Edmund and Lucy visit their cousin Eustace Scrubb. All three are sucked into a painting of Prince Caspian's ship, the Dawn Treader. Caspian, who has grown into a young man since they last saw him, explains that he is on a quest to find seven lords who were friends of his late father. The quest requires them to sail through dangerous waters, encountering new islands where things are not what they seem, and finally to sail to the end of the world.

=== The Silver Chair ===
Eustace Scrubb, cousin of the Pevensies, is at a boarding school with a girl named Jill Pole. While running away from bullies, they pass through a doorway into Aslan's country. Eustace accidentally falls off a cliff but is blown to Narnia. Alone, Jill encounters Aslan, who explains that in Narnia, King Caspian's only son and heir, Prince Rilian, disappeared some years earlier. Jill is told to memorise four signs that will lead her and Eustace to Rilian. Aslan sends Jill to Narnia, where she is reunited with Eustace near the castle of Cair Paravel and the two follow the four signs as they search for the lost prince. They finally rescue Rilian and return to Narnia with him shortly before the elderly Caspian dies.

== Cast ==
Actor	The Lion, the Witch and the Wardrobe	Prince Caspian and the Voyage of the Dawn Treader	The Silver Chair
Main cast members
Richard Dempsey	Peter Pevensie	Peter Pevensie	
Sophie Cook	Susan Pevensie	Susan Pevensie	
Jonathan R. Scott	Edmund Pevensie	Edmund Pevensie	
Sophie Wilcox	Lucy Pevensie	Lucy Pevensie	
David Thwaites		Eustace Scrubb	Eustace Scrubb
Camilla Power			Jill Pole
Recurring cast members
Jeffrey Perry	Mr. Tumnus		Mr. Tumnus
Ailsa Berk	Aslan (puppet)	Aslan (puppet) Dragon	Aslan (puppet) Dragon
William Todd-Jones	Aslan (puppet)	Aslan (puppet) Glenstorm	Aslan (puppet) Centaur
Ronald Pickup	Aslan (voice)	Aslan (voice)	Aslan (voice)
Big Mick	Little Man	Trumpkin	Trumpkin
Barbara Kellerman	White Witch	Old Hag	Green Lady
Martin Stone	Maugrim	Wolfman	
Kerry Shale	Mr Beaver		
Lesley Nicol	Mrs. Beaver		Giant Queen
Jean Marc Perret		Prince Caspian	Young Caspian
Henry Woolf		Dr. Cornelius	Dr. Cornelius
Michael Aldridge	Professor Digory Kirke		
Maureen Morris	Mrs Macready		
Bert Parnaby	Father Christmas		
Jill Goldston	Young Squirrel		
Hamish Kerr	Fox		
Ken Kitson	Giant Rumblebuffin		
Warwick Davis		Reepicheep	Glimfeather Reepicheep
Jack Purvis		Dufflepud	Golg
Samuel West		King Caspian	
John Hallam		Captain Drinian	
Geoffrey Russell			King Caspian
Richard Henders			Prince Rilian
Roy Boyd			Lord Drinian
Tom Baker			Puddleglum

== Awards ==
The series were nominated for a total of 16 awards, including a nomination for an Emmy in the category of "Outstanding Children's Program". The series won the BAFTA Award for "Best Video Lighting" (1988), and was nominated for "Best Children's Programme (Entertainment / Drama)" (1988, 1989, 1990), "Best Video Lighting" (1989, 1990), "Best Make Up" (1988, 1989, 1990), "Best Costume Design" (1988, 1989), "Best Design" (1989, 1990), and "Best Video Cameraman" (1989, 1990).

== Home video releases ==
The series has been released in various formats:

- VHS
  - 1990 Box set ASIN B000M7MPEK
- DVD
  - 2002 Box set EAN 037429171127
  - 2005 Box set Complete collectors edition (Cat. No. BBCDVD1889) EAN 5014503188924
  - 2015 Box set BBC – The Chronicles of Narnia UPC 883929118120
  - 2025 Box set BBC – The Chronicles of Narnia ASIN B0FNXW4QRX
- BLU-RAY
  - 2025 Box set BBC – The Chronicles of Narnia ASIN B0FNX9KL1Z

In Australia the first DVD release was 1 October 2005 as the 'Collector's Edition' Box Set which was a fold out package with 4 discs. Features Behind the scenes, Narnia trivia and more. There have been several later issues.

On 24 November 2025, the BBC released the entire series in a digitally remastered format. The set includes special features such as a full-length documentary.

== See also ==
- Outline of Narnia
