= Jean-Marc Perret =

British actor (born 1975)

Jean-Marc Perret (born 10 April 1975) is a British actor, most notable for his appearance as Prince Caspian in the BBC adaptation of Prince Caspian in 1989, when aged 14.

A year later, Perret made a brief appearance in the final few minutes of The Silver Chair. He played a young Caspian in Aslan's country after the elderly King Caspian (played by Geoffrey Russell) in Narnia had died.

For a period, he taught acting and drama at his old school, Bodiam Manor School in East Sussex. He now runs the stage combat company Cut & Thrust. He most recently starred in the West Yorkshire Playhouse and Birmingham Rep co-production of To Kill a Mockingbird.

Jean-Marc can also be seen in the Disney live-action feature film Cinderella.

== Filmography ==
Year	Title	Role	Notes
1989	Prince Caspian and the Voyage of the Dawn Treader	Prince Caspian	Miniseries
1990	The Silver Chair	Young Caspian	Miniseries
1993	A Haunting Harmony	Huw	TV movie
2001	Revelation	Newton's Acolyte	
