= Roy Boyd =

English actor (1938–2024)

- Born: Roy James Boyd; 18 August 1938; Croydon, Surrey, England
- Died: 27 April 2024 (aged 85)
- Occupation: Actor
- Years active: 1963–2010
- Spouse: Zohra Sadou
- Children: 3

Roy James Boyd (18 August 1938 – 27 April 2024) was an English actor best known for his roles on television between 1963 and 2010.

== Life and career ==
His television credits include The Saint, Counterstrike, The Borderers, Codename, Colditz, The Zoo Gang, The Sweeney, Warship, Doctor Who (in the serial The Hand of Fear), Survivors, The New Avengers, Space: 1999, The Professionals, Secret Army, Van der Valk, Blake's 7, Minder, Dempsey and Makepeace, The Bill, Heartbeat and New Tricks.

In 1974 Boyd had a principal guest role in lunchtime series Emmerdale Farm in which he played a mysterious tent-dwelling camper who many villagers felt had anarchist tendencies. In fact the character, Dryden Hogben, was warm, intelligent, and ended up living with the Sugdens for some time. From 1980 to 1983, Boyd had a recurring role as criminal Eddie Lee in the long running soap opera Crossroads.

His film credits include appearances in The Wicker Man (1973), The Omen (1976), A Nightingale Sang in Berkeley Square (1979), Biggles (1986) and Asylum (2005). In 1990, he portrayed the elderly Lord Drinian in the BBC adaptation of The Silver Chair, the final instalment of the BBC's adaptation of The Chronicles of Narnia books.

Boyd married Zohra Sadou and had three children. He died on 27 April 2024, at the age of 85.

== Partial filmography ==
- The Saint and the Fiction Makers (1968) - McCord
- Wolfshead: The Legend of Robin Hood (1969) - Geoffrey of Doncaster
- Twins of Evil (1971) - Dying Man (uncredited)
- The Wicker Man (1973) - Broome
- The Omen (1976) - Reporter
- A Nightingale Sang in Berkeley Square (1979) - Security Guard
- The Year of the Bodyguard (1982) - 'Captain' in Androcles
- Tuxedo Warrior (1982) - Chief Inspector Andy
- Biggles (1986) - German N.C.O
- Asylum (2005) - Trevor Wiliams
