= The Kilns =

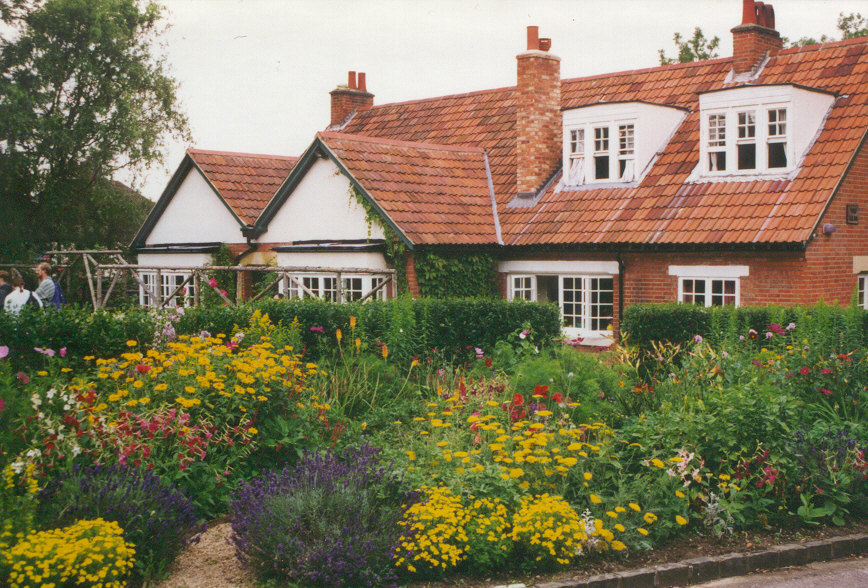
- The Kilns in 1997

- Location within Oxfordshire
- Alternative names: C. S. Lewis House

General information
- Type: Private house
- Location: Risinghurst, Oxford, England, United Kingdom
- Coordinates: 51.7568°N 1.1900°W
- Construction started: 1922
- Owner: C.S. Lewis Foundation

Website
- www.cslewis.org

The Kilns, also known as C. S. Lewis House, is the house in Risinghurst, Oxford, England, where the author C. S. Lewis wrote all of his Narnia books and other classics. The house itself was featured in the Narnia books. Lewis's gardener at The Kilns, Fred Paxford, is said to have inspired the character of Puddleglum the Marsh-wiggle in The Silver Chair.

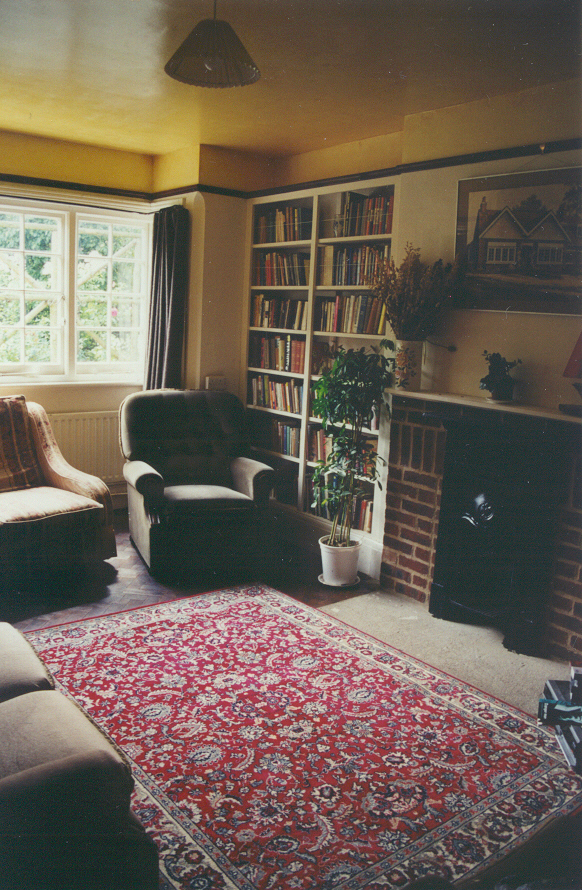
Interior view at The Kilns

The Kilns was built in 1922 on the site of a former brickworks. The lake in the garden is a flooded clay pit. In 1930, The Kilns was bought by C. S. Lewis, his brother Warren Lewis, and Janie Moore. Maureen Dunbar, Janie Moore's daughter, also lived there. C. S. Lewis wrote of the house: "I never hoped for the like". Janie Moore was the mother of Lewis's university friend Paddy Moore, who had been killed in the First World War.

The house is located in what is now called Lewis Close, south of Kiln Lane.

The Kilns is currently owned and operated by the C.S. Lewis Foundation, which runs it as the Study Centre at the Kilns.
