= Trumpkin =

Fictional character in The Chronicles of Narnia

- Narnia character
- Trumpkin, as portrayed by Peter Dinklage in The Chronicles of Narnia: Prince Caspian

In-universe information
- Race: Dwarf
- Title: Lord Regent of Narnia
- Nationality: Narnia

Trumpkin is a fictional character in C. S. Lewis' fantasy novel series The Chronicles of Narnia. Trumpkin is an intensely practical and skeptical dwarf who lives during the reigns of King Miraz and King Caspian X. He is a major character in Prince Caspian, briefly mentioned in The Voyage of the Dawn Treader, and is a minor character in The Silver Chair.

== Fictional biography ==
Trumpkin the dwarf is first introduced in the second published book of The Chronicles of Narnia titled Prince Caspian. When he enters the story, he is one of the "Old Narnian" underground, a network of dwarves, fauns, centaurs, talking beasts and others who are hiding and surviving in inaccessible wooded and mountainous country, to escape harassment from the Telmarine usurpers of Narnia. Miraz, 'Lord Protector of Narnia', is only the latest in a dynasty of rulers of a people who have systematically repressed "Old Narnia" over several centuries, although he himself has murdered his own brother Caspian IX in order to entrench this repression further. It had been so long since Aslan has appeared in Narnia, that practical persons such as Trumpkin find the notion of putting faith in a mythical talking lion, white magic, or the "fairy tale" of the two kings and two queens from Narnia's Golden Age completely ridiculous. Nevertheless, he like many others are exhausted and sick at heart at not being able to live freely in their own lands. Therefore, when the opportunity presents itself to succour, befriend, harbour and mentor the young runaway Caspian X, the actual heir to the throne and one who desires to embrace Old Narnians, Trumpkin recognizes an opportunity too good to miss. He and his allies support Caspian in rousing a hodge-podge force of Old Narnians to mount a resistance to his Uncle Miraz's rule and to challenge the broader repression of Old Narnia.

When the underground's army is being badly beaten in a siege on Aslan's How - a sacred mound which now covers the Stone Table - Caspian sounds Queen Susan's magical horn, with hope that it will bring magical help. Trumpkin is sent to the ruins of Cair Paravel to meet any help, should it arrive there. At the ruins he meets the ancient kings and queens Peter, Edmund, Susan, and Lucy. Despite the success of the horn's call, Trumpkin is true-to-character, singularly unimpressed with the results; four children, when the best he would have imagined are four powerful adult warriors and strategists. He supports them on their journey and helps guide them to Aslan's How, the military base of the underground. However it is only when they approach this sacred place, that Aslan finally reveals himself to Trumpkin face-to-face in an overwhelming way, and thus comes Trumpkin's moment of truth and his embracement of faith - whether he likes it or not.

After the war, King Caspian names him Lord Regent of Narnia. He does not appear in The Voyage of the Dawn Treader, but is mentioned as the one who is ruling the country during Caspian's voyage.

Half a century later, in The Silver Chair, Trumpkin is a very elderly, deaf dwarf who is again running the country while an elderly Caspian is away on his ship to "see again the places of his youth", although many believe that he had set out to seek Aslan to find out who could be the next King of Narnia after him, as his only son Rilian had disappeared 10 years before - not knowing that Eustace and his friend Jill Pole would be arriving in Narnia to rescue and deliver the heir to the Narnian throne.

Glimfeather the owl brings Eustace Scrubb and Jill Pole to Trumpkin, who gives them lodging in the castle of Cair Paravel, but puts no effort into listening to their pleas or getting others to do so. Indeed, as others have been lost in the quest for Caspian's lost son, he is also unlikely to provide them with any assistance, regardless of any accompanying message from Aslan. His healthy skepticism in the face of grief and old age has hardened into conservative obfuscation.

Trumpkin outlives Caspian and proclaims Rilian, the son of Caspian, as King of Narnia shortly after he returns from Underland where the Lady of the Green Kirtle has been holding him captive.

Trumpkin is known for using alliterative exclamations such as "Tubs and tortoise-shells!", "Beards and bedsteads!", and "Crows and crockery!"

== Portrayals ==
Trumpkin, as portrayed by Big Mick in the BBC serials Prince Caspian and the Voyage of the Dawn Treader and The Silver Chair

Actor	Year	Medium
Big Mick	1989 & 1990	BBC television miniseries
Richard Griffiths	1994	BBC Radio broadcast
Chris Emmett	2000	Focus on the Family Radio Theater production
Peter Dinklage	2008	Theatrical feature film The Chronicles of Narnia: Prince Caspian
