= Lord Drinian =

Drinian
- Narnia character

In-universe information
- Race: Human
- Nationality: Narnia

Lord Drinian is a fictional character in C. S. Lewis's The Chronicles of Narnia. In The Voyage of the Dawn Treader he is the captain of the Dawn Treader and a close friend of King Caspian X. In The Silver Chair, he has remained a trusted advisor of the king, and has also become a close friend of Caspian's son, Prince Rilian.

== The Voyage of the Dawn Treader ==
In The Voyage of the Dawn Treader, one of the first new characters to be introduced is Lord Drinian, the captain of the Dawn Treader. He is described as a dark-haired young man who loyally serves Caspian on his voyage to the end of the world. Although the seafaring trade in Narnia was severely limited by King Miraz's fear of the sea, Caspian, through his influence as the king, resurrects Narnia's interest in navigation and sailing. As a result, Drinian is one of a few Narnians with a vast knowledge of seafaring. Armed with these skills and his friendly sense of humor, Drinian greatly aids Caspian and his crew in their search for the seven lost lords.

Though Drinian is one of the most experienced sailors from Narnia, even he is occasionally surprised throughout the course of their journey. For example, when they reach the island that they later rename Dragon Island, they encounter a creature that most of the crew has never seen before: a dragon. Skeptical, Drinian asserts that dragons, like crocodiles, cannot be trusted and refuses to let his guard down. In fact, it is only upon discovering the dragon's identity (Eustace) that Drinian is able to trust it.

This cautiousness proves useful on another occasion. Later in their journey, Drinian spots something that turns out to be a sea serpent. Surviving the sea serpent's attack, Drinian and the ship head for a welcome respite in an approaching harbor. When Caspian suggests that they anchor in a different section of the harbor, Drinian obeys patiently but with a little reluctance at having his own choice for their resting place denied.

As they near the edge of the world, Lucy spots a fantastic view of merpeople who are unlike those she had seen in Narnia. Drinian realizes the possible danger they pose to his crew, as any of the men might fall in love with a mermaid or even in love with the world under the water itself and fall overboard; as a result, he orders Lucy to ignore the merpeople and act as if she had not seen them. When Reepicheep falls overboard, Drinian berates him out of worry because he fears for both Reepicheep's safety as well as the possibility that the crew may discover the merpeople.

After Reepicheep, Lucy, Eustace, and Edmund continue on their journey to the very edge of the world, Drinian successfully returns Caspian and the crew safely home to Narnia.

== The Silver Chair ==
In The Silver Chair, Lord Drinian has remained a good friend and trusted advisor of King Caspian X. Though Caspian is depicted as being significantly older in this work than in the previous one, Drinian is very active for his age - Caspian is now 66 and in a state of health which suggests he is nearing the end of his life, yet Drinian is still riding a horse despite clearly being at least in his seventies. Drinian also became a close friend of Caspian's son Rilian.

After Caspian's wife is fatally bitten by a serpent, Rilian keeps returning to the woods where his mother was killed, clearly intent on tracking down and killing the serpent which killed his mother, but he never manages to find any trace of it. Drinian then approaches Rilian, however, and urges him not to continue trying to track down the serpent, only for Rilian to explain that he is not revisiting the scene of his mother's death for this reason. When Rilian leads Drinian to the very place where his mother died, Drinian discovers why Rilian is returning there. They spot a beautiful woman, who is clearly the reason for Rilian's decision to keep returning to this location. Although Drinian questions the attraction that Rilian has for this woman, he also refuses to question Rilian's motives any further and does not object to Rilian returning there in the future. Rilian then returns to the location but he never returns. Drinian helps in the search for Rilian but nobody ever finds a trace of him, leaving Caspian to fear that he will never see his son again. When Drinian presents his knowledge of the events leading to Rilian's disappearance to Caspian, he begs Caspian to condemn him as a traitor, for he has allowed the son of his good friend to disappear. Though Drinian implores Caspian for death as punishment for his treachery, Caspian is unable to kill him, not wanting to lose his friend as he has already lost his queen and his son, and the two mourn the loss of Rilian as friends. For the next 10 years, Rilian's disappearance remains an unsolved mystery, with nobody in Narnia knowing where he went to or whether he is still alive.

The serpent which killed the Queen was in fact the Lady of the Green Kirtle, who ruled the underworld beneath Narnia and was intent on breaking through to invade it. She later lured Rilian into the underworld. A decade later, Eustace Scrubb and Jill Pole entered Narnia and along with their guide, Puddleglum the marshwiggle, they found their way into the underworld to save Rilian, who then killed the Lady of the Green Kirtle, and returned to Narnia.

During the primary narrative of The Silver Chair, which takes place a decade after Rilian's disappearance, Drinian accompanies Caspian as he voyages through the seas explored in The Voyage of the Dawn Treader. Caspian had told his people that he wanted to make this voyage to see again the place of his youth, but many believed that he had gone to seek Aslan to ask who could be the next King of Narnia after his death, as he no longer expected to see Rilian again. But the voyage is disrupted by Aslan before they reach the end of the world, who explains to Caspian that he must return home to Narnia.

When Caspian is reunited with his lost son Rilian, the elderly and now frail Drinian disembards from the ship just before the king (who is carried down in a stretcher) to rejoice in the efforts of Eustace and Jill -- and is at Caspian's side when the king dies soon after, and witnesses the declaration of Rilian as King of Narnia.

== Film adaption ==
In the 1989 BBC miniseries presentation of The Voyage of the Dawn Treader, Drinian is played by a 48-year-old John Hallam, whereas in the 1990 BBC miniseries presentation of The Silver Chair (as an elderly man in a scene from some 40 years later) he is played by Roy Boyd, who was 52 at the time but was perhaps portraying a much older man who was relatively active and young-looking for his age; for instance, Drinian was still riding a horse. In the 2010 Walden/Fox film, The Voyage of the Dawn Treader, he is played by Gary Sweet.

== Conception ==
When he was at school in his younger days, C.S. Lewis studied classic Greek works including the Odyssey. One of the iconic scenes from the Odyssey is repeated in The Voyage of the Dawn Treader, in which Drinian fears his crew's sanity and safety when Lucy discovers merpeople (although Drinian does not resort to using wax on his crew to block out their noise like Odysseus). Indeed, Dawn Treader follows in the same sea saga as the Odyssey, with the crew encountering mythical creatures and mysterious islands. Although Drinian is highly proficient in nautical expertise, he is not depicted as being noble or as having an inextinguishable desire for glory and, as a result, does not exhibit any other trait similarities with Odysseus. Similar to the mythology and archaic material within the Greek works, Lewis also enjoyed Arthurian myths. Lastly, Lewis suggested that he was greatly influenced by dreams when creating the characters and situations within his works. In conclusion, Drinian is a compilation of Odysseus from the Odyssey and the heroes of the Arthurian myths.
