= Silver Chair =

The Silver Chair is a 1953 children's novel by C. S. Lewis.

The Silver Chair can also refer to:

- The Silver Chair, a 1990 BBC television programme based on the novel
- The Chronicles of Narnia: The Silver Chair, a proposed film based on the novel
- Silverchair, an Australian rock band
