= The Chronicles of Narnia: The Voyage of the Dawn Treader =

2010 film by Michael Apted

- Theatrical release poster
- Directed by: Michael Apted
- Screenplay by: Christopher Markus Stephen McFeely; Michael Petroni
- Based on: The Voyage of the Dawn Treader by C. S. Lewis
- Produced by: Mark Johnson; Andrew Adamson; Philip Steuer
- Starring: Georgie Henley; Skandar Keynes; Ben Barnes; Will Poulter; Tilda Swinton
- Cinematography: Dante Spinotti
- Edited by: Rick Shaine
- Music by: David Arnold
- Production companies: Fox 2000 Pictures; 20th Century Fox Animation; Walden Media; Dune Entertainment; Mark Johnson Productions
- Distributed by: 20th Century Fox
- Release dates: November 30, 2010 (Royal Film Performance); December 9, 2010 (United Kingdom); December 10, 2010 (United States)
- Running time: 113 minutes
- Countries: United Kingdom; United States
- Language: English
- Budget: $140–155 million
- Box office: $415.6 million

The Chronicles of Narnia: The Voyage of the Dawn Treader is a 2010 high fantasy film directed by Michael Apted from a screenplay by Christopher Markus, Stephen McFeely, and Michael Petroni. It is based on the 1952 novel The Voyage of the Dawn Treader, the third published and fifth chronological novel in the children's book series The Chronicles of Narnia by C. S. Lewis. The sequel to The Chronicles of Narnia: Prince Caspian (2008), it is the third installment in The Chronicles of Narnia film series by Walden Media. It is the only film in the series not distributed by Walt Disney Pictures.

Georgie Henley, Skandar Keynes, Ben Barnes and Tilda Swinton reprise their roles from the second film, with Will Poulter joining the cast. The film is set three Narnian years after the events of Prince Caspian. The two youngest Pevensie siblings, Edmund and Lucy, are transported back to Narnia along with their cousin Eustace Scrubb. They join the new king of Narnia, Caspian, in his quest to rescue seven lost lords and save Narnia from a corrupting evil on a dark island. Each character is tested as they journey to the home of Aslan at the world's far end. Development on the film began in 2007, while Prince Caspian was still in production. Filming was supposed to take place in Malta, the Czech Republic, and Iceland in 2008 with Michael Apted as its new director, for a planned release in 2009. However, production was halted after a budgetary dispute between Walden Media and Walt Disney Pictures following Prince Caspian's performance at the box office, resulting in Disney's departure from the production and being replaced by 20th Century Fox under its Fox 2000 Pictures label. Later, filming took place in Australia and New Zealand in 2009. It is the only film in the series to be released in 3D.

The Chronicles of Narnia: The Voyage of the Dawn Treader premiered on November 30, 2010, selected for the Royal Film Performance, before it was theatrically released on December 9 in the United Kingdom and December 10 in the United States. The film received mixed reviews from critics, but was a moderate success at the box office, grossing $415.6 million worldwide, and becoming 20th Century Fox's highest-grossing film in 2010. The song "There's a Place for Us" by Carrie Underwood was nominated for Best Original Song at the 68th Golden Globe Awards. An adaptation of The Silver Chair was to be the fourth entry in the film series, but in the fall of 2011, Walden Media's contract with the C. S. Lewis estate expired; the series would instead be rebooted with the Netflix film Narnia: The Magician's Nephew.

== Plot ==
Three Narnian years and one Earth year after the events of Prince Caspian, Edmund and Lucy Pevensie are staying with their irritating cousin Eustace Scrubb while their older siblings Peter and Susan are in America as World War II rages on. To his disappointment, Edmund is too young to enlist in His Majesty's Armed Forces. A painting of a ship on the ocean transports Edmund, Lucy, and Eustace into an ocean in Narnia. They are rescued by the Dawn Treader. Caspian invites them on a voyage to rescue the seven Lords of Narnia whom his uncle Miraz exiled. In the Lone Islands, Caspian and Edmund are imprisoned, and Lucy and Eustace are sold as slaves. Caspian meets one of the lost lords, who reveals that unsold slaves are sacrificed to a green mist. The crew of the Dawn Treader rescues Caspian and the others. Caspian outlaws the slave trade and appoints the lord governor. The lord gives Caspian his sword, one of the seven given to the lords by Aslan. On another island, Lucy is abducted by invisible Dufflepuds who force her to enter the manor of the magician Coriakin to find a visibility spell. Coriakin encourages the crew to defeat the mist by laying the lords' swords at Aslan's Table on Ramandu's island, but warns they will be tested. Wishing to be like Susan, Lucy recites a beauty incantation she finds and enters a dream in which she is Susan, and neither Lucy nor Narnia exists. Aslan chides Lucy for her self-doubt, explaining that her siblings know of Narnia only because of her. On a third island, another sword is recovered from a pool that turns anything it touches into gold. Wandering alone, Eustace finds a cursed treasure and steals some of it. Edmund and Caspian search for Eustace and discover the remains of another of the lords, recovering his sword. They encounter a dragon, which turns out to be Eustace transformed by the treasure's curse. Reepicheep befriends Eustace, who has a change of heart and becomes useful to the crew.

The crew arrives at Aslan's Table to find three lost lords in an enchanted sleep. As they place the swords on the table, they realize one is missing. A star descends from the sky and transforms into Ramandu's daughter Lilliandil. She guides them to the Dark Island, the lair of the mist, where they discover the last lord. The mist uses Edmund's fear to create a sea serpent that attacks the ship. Eustace fights the serpent, but the panicked lord wounds him with the last sword, sending him flying. He encounters Aslan, who transforms him back into a boy for his self-sacrifice and sends him to Ramandu's island with the last sword. As the crew fights the serpent, the mist distracts Edmund by appearing as Jadis, the White Witch. Eustace reaches the table, but the mist tries to stop him from setting the sword down with the others. He overcomes the mist, allowing the swords to unleash their magic and bestow on Edmund, using Peter's sword, the power to slay the sea serpent, the death of which awakens the three lords. The mist of the Dark Island is destroyed when they liberate the sacrificed slaves. Eustace rejoins the others, and they sail to a mysterious shore before a massive wave. Aslan appears, telling them that his country lies beyond, although if they go there, they can never return. Caspian's duty as king dissuades him from following his wish to enter Aslan's country, but Reepicheep is determined to enter. Aslan blesses him, and he bids farewell to the others. Aslan tells Edmund and Lucy that, like Peter and Susan, they are now too old to return to Narnia. He tells Eustace that he may return one day and encourages them to know him in their world by another name. He opens a portal for them to return to the present world. The trio bids farewell to Aslan and Prince Caspian, and are transported back into the bedroom. Eustace hears his mother announcing that Jill Pole has come to visit him. As they leave the bedroom, they look sadly back at the painting and see the ship voyaging through the waves disappear before Lucy closes the door.

== Cast ==
=== Pevensies and Scrubbs ===
- Skandar Keynes as Edmund Pevensie: The third oldest of the Pevensie children and a King of Narnia. He is more mature after the events of Prince Caspian, and he takes good care of his younger sister and cousin while they embark on a voyage to defeat the enemy. On his last journey, his hunger for more power against Caspian and the White Witch is being tested.
- Georgie Henley as Lucy Pevensie: The youngest of the Pevensie children. A Queen of Narnia who first discovered the world of Narnia during the events of The Lion, the Witch and the Wardrobe, she comes back to Narnia to save it from a threatening darkness while her faith is being tested along the way. Henley feels that Lucy's desire to be more beautiful than her sister Susan represents the dilemma of modern teenage girls on beauty and image.
- Will Poulter as Eustace Scrubb: The Pevensie children's irritating cousin who gets transported to Narnia for the first time. At first, he annoys everyone with his arrogance and greed, but he dramatically changes after he is cursed for his sins and becomes a dragon. With the support of his cousins and the warrior mouse Reepicheep, Eustace becomes a more generous and cooperative soul. He uses his dragon form to good advantage first when the Dawn Treader is caught in magically induced doldrums by towing the ship and later attacking the sea serpent, earning the crew's respect and being restored by Aslan for his self-sacrifice.

=== Dawn Treader crew ===
- Ben Barnes as King Caspian X: Caspian was raised as a Telmarine prince and was helped by the Pevensie children to ascend to the throne as the new King of Narnia during the events of Prince Caspian. As the King of Narnia, he has grown into a wise young man and embarks on a voyage to seek the seven lost lords of Narnia and defeat an enemy who threatens to corrupt it. Along the way, his faith is tested when he is tempted by the green mist of Dark Island, which appears to him as his greatest fear—his father feeling nothing but disappointment in him. Also on the voyage, Caspian finds a new love interest when he meets Lilliandil on Ramandu's Island and is instantly smitten with her.
- Simon Pegg as the voice of Reepicheep: Reepicheep is the valiant swashbuckling mouse who aided Caspian and the Pevensie children during the events of Prince Caspian. He joins Caspian in the voyage on the Dawn Treader because he is aware that his time is at an end; he must seek the unseen Aslan's Country as his last voyage. Pegg replaced Eddie Izzard because director Michael Apted thought that his voice is more mature and serious compared to Izzard's. Bill Nighy was originally announced as Izzard's replacement, but the studio thought his voice sounded too old for the role and decided to go in a different direction.
- Gary Sweet as Lord Drinian: The captain of the Dawn Treader and Caspian's best friend. He is a very cautious and protective captain and is somewhat superstitious about stories of sea serpents.
- Shane Rangi as Tavros the Minotaur: Rangi also played Asterius the Minotaur in Prince Caspian and General Otmin in The Lion, The Witch and the Wardrobe.
- Morgan Evans as Randy the Faun
- Steven Rooke as Nausus the Faun
- Tony Nixon as 1st Mate (Rynelf)

=== Narnians ===
- Liam Neeson as the voice of Aslan: Aslan is a great lion and the highest of all the Kings of Narnia. He tests everyone's faith as they embark on a voyage to defeat evil and seek his country at the ends of the world. He later guides Reepicheep to his own country.
- Laura Brent as Lilliandil: Lilliandil is the daughter of the retired star Ramandu, and the Blue Star that shines over Ramandu's Island; the crew on the Dawn Treader follows her position in the sky to reach the island. She aids the crew in destroying the evil of Dark Island and is also Caspian's love interest. The name of Ramandu's Daughter is not mentioned in the novel, so producer Douglas Gresham coined the name "Lilliandil".
- Bille Brown as Coriakin: A wizard and a retired star who guides the Dufflepuds to wisdom. He reveals to the crew the evil that threatens to corrupt Narnia and warns them that each one of them will be tested in their faith by Aslan.
- Terry Norris as Lord Bern: One of the Lost Lords of Narnia who settled on the Lone Islands. He later succeeds as its new Governor.
- Bruce Spence as Lord Rhoop: One of the Lost Lords of Narnia. He gets trapped on the Dark Island.
- Arabella Morton as Gael: A Lone Islander whose mother was sacrificed to the green mist. She later sneaks on board the Dawn Treader to follow her father (Rhince, played by Arthur Angel), who also joins the Dawn Treader crew to look for his wife. She is good friends with Lucy and sees her as her heroine, as Lucy acts much like a big sister to her.
- Nathaniel Parker as Caspian IX: The late father of Caspian X, who was murdered by his brother Miraz shortly after his son's birth. The green mist of Dark Island appears to Caspian as his father, telling him that he is ashamed to call him his son.
- David Vallon as Governor Gumpas
- Michael Foster as Gumpas's money collector
- Colin Moody as Pug, the leader of a gang of slavers in Narrowhaven of the Lone Islands.
- Roy Billing as Chief Dufflepud

=== Cameos ===
- William Moseley as Peter Pevensie: Peter is the oldest of the Pevensie children, who was crowned as the High King of Narnia during the events of The Lion, the Witch and the Wardrobe. He was too old to experience the wonders of Narnia after the events of Prince Caspian. He, along with Susan, went to the United States with their parents.
- Anna Popplewell as Susan Pevensie: Susan is the second oldest of the Pevensie children and a Queen of Narnia. She, like her older brother Peter, was too old to visit Narnia a third time. She and Peter went to the United States with their parents, leaving their younger siblings to spend a not-so-fun holiday with their cousin Eustace.
- Tilda Swinton as Jadis, the White Witch: The White Witch is a former queen of Charn and a witch who ruled Narnia after the events of The Magician's Nephew and during the events of The Lion, the Witch and the Wardrobe. Edmund's memories of her are revived by the mist to torment him in his test to defeat temptation.
- Douglas Gresham as a slave buyer: Douglas Gresham is the stepson of C. S. Lewis and has made cameo appearances in all three Narnia films, all of which he produced.

== Production ==
=== Development ===
Michael Apted took over as the film's director from Andrew Adamson, who opted to produce, with Mark Johnson, Perry Moore, and Douglas Gresham. Steven Knight wrote the script following a draft by Christopher Markus and Stephen McFeely. Richard Taylor, Isis Mussenden, and Howard Berger continued their roles working on the production design and practical effects, while visual effects supervisor Jim Rygiel, composer David Arnold, and cinematographer Dante Spinotti are newcomers to the series. The film was officially budgeted at $140 million, although some estimates put the cost at $155 million.

The Dawn Treader as featured in the film

When Apted signed on to direct The Voyage of the Dawn Treader in June 2007, filming was set to begin in January 2008 for a May 1, 2009 release date. Shooting would have begun in Malta, and then moved to Prague and Iceland. A few months later, Disney announced that "in consideration of the challenging schedules for [its] young actors", they were delaying the release date to May 7, 2010, and filming was moved to October 2008. Johnson rescheduled the shoot to Playas de Rosarito, Baja California (Mexico), where two thirds of the film would be shot at the water tank that was used for Titanic and Master and Commander: The Far Side of the World. Filming was also scheduled for Australia. Disney and Walden eventually grew concerned over safety in Mexico, and Australian officials at Warner Roadshow Studios in Queensland offered to become the project's base for the whole shoot.

Disney announced on December 24, 2008, that it would no longer co-produce the film. Disney and Walden disputed over the budget after the box office performance of Prince Caspian grossed far less than The Lion, the Witch and the Wardrobe; Disney wanted to limit it to $100 million, whereas Walden wanted a $140 million budget, of which Disney would only need to provide half. Another reason why Disney opted not to produce the film was that they feared the budget would only grow during filming and post-production. The Los Angeles Times also reported "creative differences" led to the split. Times columnist Mary McNamara noted that Disney leaving the series could be a mistake, because Voyage is the most popular Narnia book, while Caspian was the series' least popular and did not create the anticipation surrounding the first film. Walden began searching for a new distributor for the film. Several other studios, including Sony's Columbia Pictures, Universal Pictures, Paramount Pictures, Warner Bros., and 20th Century Fox were in negotiations to distribute the film, although several markets already predicted that Fox would take over. It was announced in January 2009 that 20th Century Fox would replace Walt Disney Pictures as the distributor while Disney would still retain the rights for the first two. Fox had pursued the Narnia film rights in 2001 and distributed various other Walden projects. Producer Mark Johnson admitted that "we made some mistakes with Prince Caspian and I don't want to make them again". He said it was "very important" that filmmakers regain the magic for The Dawn Treader.

=== Writing ===
Michael Petroni was hired to rewrite the script with Christopher Markus and Stephen McFeely, following a draft written by Richard LaGravenese and Steven Knight. The previous two films have been described as remaining more faithful to the original stories than the third installment. Apted noted the episodic and disconnected nature of the story would need to be revised for a film version, such as the material involving the Dark Island, the Sea Serpent, and Eustace. They even discussed combining The Voyage of the Dawn Treader with The Silver Chair, much as the BBC combined Dawn Treader and Prince Caspian in its television serial. As a result, some elements were borrowed from The Silver Chair, where Narnians are held hostage and rescued. The author's estate did not initially receive the change well, but it gained favor after review.

Eustace has a greater role as a dragon in the film: he proceeds as a dragon with the ship to the next islands and proves to be a valuable asset for the crew for the remainder of the voyage. This allows the character to take a major part in the action, beyond mere work duty on the ship, as in the book. The filmmakers felt that the book's description of Eustace's stream of consciousness as he realizes that he had become a dragon while sleeping was effective as text, but that it could not easily be translated onto film (though the 1989 BBC version did exactly that). Further, the film omits a noted passage from the book, where Aslan peels Eustace's dragon skin off in layers. Walden President Micheal Flaherty remarked that "people don't earn grace; they receive it once they are humbled and aware of their need." The film also omits the passage describing Eustace discovering the old dragon who dies next to its hoard in the valley.

=== Filming ===
Ernie Malik, a unit publicist for the film, confirmed that filming began on July 27, 2009, on location in Queensland, Australia. Filming took place at Village Roadshow Studios in August and September 2009, with filming of exterior shots on board the ship at Cleveland Point and the Gold Coast Seaway in September 2009. Apted stated that fellow directors Gore Verbinski and Peter Weir recommended him not to shoot on water, so they built a giant Dawn Treader on a gimbal at, which allowed it to rock and shift as if on the high seas. At the end of the town's peninsula, jutting into Moreton Bay, the 145-tonne (160-ton) boat could be rotated through 360 degrees to keep the sun angles consistent. Additional shots were taken at the Southport School, also located on the Gold Coast. It was also filmed around White Island off the coast of Tauranga, New Zealand.

=== Effects ===
The two stages of animating the King's College Gatehouse in Cambridge University

1,400 special effects shots were made for The Voyage of the Dawn Treader, more than The Lion, the Witch and the Wardrobe's 800 and fewer than Prince Caspian's 1,500 shots. Angus Bickerton served as the lead visual effects supervisor of the film, while Jim Rygiel, who supervised the effects on The Lord of the Rings film trilogy, worked as the senior visual effects supervisor. British visual effects companies the Moving Picture Company, Framestore CFC, and The Senate VFX were hired to create the visual effects alongside Cinesite and The Mill. Moving Picture worked on the dragon Eustace and the Dawn Treader. They say the dragon is "amongst the most heroic characters ever created, and is scheduled to be featured in around 200 shots of the movie." They also revised Reepicheep from the previous film by saturating his color, giving him bushier eyebrows and ear hair, and making his whiskers a little more wiry just to give him a sense of age. Framestore also revised Aslan, changing his color palette to be a more realistic lion than a golden lion and adding a darker mane; they also created 16 different dufflepuds to replace Jonathan Fawkner and Angus Bickerton running around first as dufflepuds on the set; The Senate worked on the opening shot of King's College, Cambridge, as well as the star effect on Liliandil at Ramandu's Island; Cinesite worked on the Dark Island, and Fugitive Studios did the end titles and credits, which featured original drawings created by Pauline Baynes for the Narnia books. These illustrations were included because the film's creators wanted the credits to have visual interest, and also because they wished to include an acknowledgment to Pauline Baynes, who died in August 2008.

==== Conversion to 3D ====
"Well, the thing about us is that we have a long time. We decided in February [2010] to make " The Dawn Treader " a 3D movie, so we had nine months to do it. Some of these other films put 3D in very quickly. I believe something like Clash of the Titans had about eight weeks. So, we have had time to think about it, so it hasn't been a rush. I think we'll get very good value out of it. They won't see anything cheap or nasty. Rest assured of that."

— Michael Apted defending the film's conversion to 3D after a series of media criticism of 3D conversions of films released in 2010,

After the success of the 3D release of Avatar, 20th Century Fox announced in February 2010 that The Voyage of the Dawn Treader would be released in Digital 3D and RealD 3D formats; it is the first Narnia film to have a 3D release. Walden had previous experience creating 3D films, having released James Cameron's documentaries Ghosts of the Abyss and Aliens of the Deep, as well as Journey to the Center of the Earth with New Line Cinema. The filmmakers initially discussed shooting the film in 3D during principal photography but later decided to shoot with two-dimensional cameras to save on costs. Prime Focus Group was hired in June 2010 to convert the film to 3D during post-production. Film director Joe Dante remarked that Michael Apted was at first skeptical about the conversion, stating, "If I was gonna do a 3D movie, I would have done it differently." Later, he remarked that he was excited after seeing progress during the conversion. Dawn Treader was his first 3D film. Johnson later said that the reason for the film's 3D release was to help Dawn Treader at the box office, where it would compete with films such as Tangled, Tron: Legacy, and Yogi Bear which were released in 3D.

=== Music ===
Composer David Arnold scored the film, with themes composed by Harry Gregson-Williams (who scored the first two films). It was Arnold's fourth collaboration with Apted, after The World Is Not Enough, Enough, and Amazing Grace. Arnold worked with Paul Apted in editing the score. The scoring sessions took place during September, and work was completed on October 8, 2010. An original song, "There's a Place for Us" written by Carrie Underwood, David Hodges, and Hillary Lindsey, and recorded by Underwood, was released on November 16, 2010, exclusively on iTunes. It was released on December 7, 2010, by Sony Masterworks. Covers of the song have been recorded by various singers around the world.

== Marketing ==
=== Promotions ===
In addition to its production budget, Fox and Walden spent around $100 million to promote the film around the world. In late November 2009, three still pictures from the film were released on the social networking site Facebook. In February 2010, Narnia.com, the official domain, returned after a nine-month hiatus, bringing exclusive reports from the set. The full site, with the first trailer, information on the film's story and cast, and other content, opened on June 17, 2010. The film's first promotional banner was presented at the 2010 Cannes Film Festival, which was followed by a teaser poster in May 2010. A Christian Narnia conference was held from June 3–6, 2010, at Taylor University in Upland, Indiana. Director Michael Apted and some of the producers gave exclusive commentary on and first looks at the film, including a 5-minute "super trailer". Franklin Graham's Samaritan's Purse program promoted an international relief campaign entitled Operation Narnia to donate relief goods to children around the world from July to December 2010.

The historic caravel ship the Matthew was transformed into a replica of The Dawn Treader to promote the film. It sailed from the Atlantic Ocean to the English Channel in August 2010. National Geographic Channel and Fox conducted a series of contests in Europe for people who want to visit the ship for three days. The National Maritime Museum in Cornwall made the ship available to the public from August 28 to August 30, 2010.

"It's a story that has English roots, but it's relatable to every child on the planet because it's about growing up, finding yourself, coming to terms with yourself, and knowing what your values are."

— Michael Apted on the heart of the film

IGN said that the film "was far more reminiscent of the vibrant and optimistic The Lion, the Witch and the Wardrobe than of its dark and violent sequel, Prince Caspian". UGO said that "Narnia's gone back to the magic" and remarked that "sailing the high seas looks fun!" The first official trailer for the film was released online on June 17, 2010. The trailer was attached to the theatrical release of Toy Story 3 on June 18, 2010, and then attached to Alpha and Omega on September 17, 2010. 20th Century Fox released the trailer on the Diary of a Wimpy Kid DVD release. An international poster and trailer for the film were shown on October 7, 2010. A third trailer was released on November 9, 2010. To promote the film's release, American television networks ABC and Disney Channel broadcast The Lion, The Witch and the Wardrobe on December 11, 13, and 14. Cable network Syfy screened Prince Caspian on December 12 and 13.

=== Books ===
HarperCollins published new editions of The Voyage of the Dawn Treader and The Chronicles of Narnia on October 26, 2010, with new images of the film. Harper published a new edition of The Chronicles of Narnia, commemorating the 60th anniversary of The Lion, the Witch and the Wardrobe, and released it the same day. A movie storybook and several other tie-in books were released by HarperChildrens, Walden Pond Press, and Zondervan to promote the film. On November 12, 2010, HarperCollins released an enhanced multimedia e-book of The Voyage of the Dawn Treader for several platforms including iPad and Android.

Group Publishing released three previews from the film and included it in their vacation Bible school resource kit called Fun for the Whole Family Hour on August 19, 2010. Grace Hill Media released a resource tool entitled Narnia Faith for ministers and pastors on October 12, 2010.

=== Games ===
==== Mobile game ====
In 2010, the mobile video game The Chronicles of Narnia: The Voyage of the Dawn Treader was released, developed by Fox Digital Entertainment, it was released in 2010. It is a sequel to The Lion, the Witch and the Wardrobe and Prince Caspian movie-based video games. The game is set as a journey to Aslan's country and then back to England. As King Caspian, Edmund, or Lucy, the player will encounter sea monsters and dragons in epic battles. Loosely based on the movie The Chronicles of Narnia: The Voyage of the Dawn Treader, the game also shares some sequences with the original book.

The player becomes one of the film's three main characters: King Caspian, Lucy and Edmund. Gameplay includes defeating enemies including bosses with a sword as well as solving simple puzzles. In some parts, the player will control a rowboat and has to evade rocks and attack pirates on a rowboat. Health and stamina can be replenished along the way by picking up bottles dropped by defeating enemies, destroying jars, or opening treasure chests. The game, just like its predecessor, was met with average to mixed reviews upon release. Will Wilson, writing for the mobile gaming website Pocket Gamer, gave a 6/10 mixed review, stating that: "The Voyage of the Dawn Treader is a solid movie tie-in that doesn't desecrate the license and will please fans, but it doesn't offer up anything to get pulses racing either".

==== Cancelled console game ====
Back in early 2009, Destructoid reported that video game developer Nihilistic Software was working on the video game for The Chronicles of Narnia: The Voyage of the Dawn Treader. This was substantiated by an online resume for Nestor Angeles on the Animator Database. It was then assumed that the game would be completed in coincidence with the film's release in December 2010. Less than a year thereafter it has been revealed that the video game adaptation of The Voyage of the Dawn Treader produced by Nihilistic Software was canceled when Walt Disney Pictures (and therefore Disney Interactive) left the Narnia project in late 2008/early 2009.

== Release ==
The Voyage of the Dawn Treader held its world premiere on November 30, 2010, in London as the 64th Royal Film Performance in Leicester Square. It was the first time the Royal Film Performance was unveiled in Digital 3D and the second time an opening film bowed at the event, the first being The Lion, the Witch and the Wardrobe in 2005. The premiere was attended by various personalities, including Queen Elizabeth II and Prince Philip. It was given a pre-release gala on December 8 in Knoxville, Tennessee followed by a North American premiere in Louisville, Kentucky on December 9, 2010. The film was originally set to have a May 2009 release date when Disney was still producing it. But it was later delayed when Disney pulled itself, and Fox helmed the production. Fox later announced a December 2010 release date because it felt that Narnia would do better during the holidays. It had its major release in Asia and Australia on December 2, 2010, and in North America and Europe on December 10, 2010.

=== Critical reception ===
The Voyage of the Dawn Treader was met with mixed reviews from critics. Review aggregator website Rotten Tomatoes reports that 49% of critics gave the film a positive review, based on a sample of 168 reviews, with a rating average of 5.7/10. The consensus reads: "Its leisurely, businesslike pace won't win the franchise many new fans, but Voyage of the Dawn Treader restores some of the Narnia franchise's lost luster with strong performances and impressive special effects." On Metacritic, which assigns a weighted mean rating from film critics, the film has a rating score of 53% based on 33 reviews, indicating "mixed to average" reviews. CinemaScore polls conducted during the opening weekend revealed the average grade cinemagoers gave the film an A− on an A+ to F scale.

Roger Ebert of the Chicago Sun-Times praised the film and gave it three stars out of four, saying "This is a rip-snorting adventure fantasy for families, especially the younger members who are not insistent on continuity." Roger Moore of the Orlando Sentinel gave it a three stars out of four; he remarked it is "a worthy challenger to the far more popular Harry Potter pictures". The Guardian gave the film a positive review. They stated that the film "arrives with confidence and bravado intact. ... and arguably the most Tolkien-esque of the Narnia books". IGN was positive, stating "The Voyage of the Dawn Treader is a solid sequel that might even surpass the first entry as the best in the series for some fans. It also bodes well for the future of this once iffy franchise."

Several film critics have praised Apted's direction in character development and Poulter's performance as Eustace. Among them, The Arizona Republic's Kerry Lengel said, "The best thing about the film is neither the top-notch CGI nor the shallow moral lessons but the performance of Georgie Henley as Lucy as well as the performance of her and Edmund's insufferable cousin Eustace Scrubb." Luke Y. Thompson from E! Online praised the performances, stating "Henley and Keynes are charming as ever, and Poulter's turn as Eustace injects a welcome note of comedic cynicism into the sea of sentimentality. Simon Pegg ably succeeds Eddie Izzard as mouse warrior Reepicheep, Bille Brown's sorcerer Coriakin has a fun performance, and a sequence in which Lucy inadvertently wishes her life away is brilliantly disorienting and nightmarish."

Despite the movie adaptation of the book to appeal to the "everyman" and not just to Christian audiences and Lewis fans (with the introduction of the search for the seven swords side plot, the continued reoccurrence of the White Queen, and the larger role for the dragon Eustace), Christian reviewers found much to like about the movie. The key for many was the closing scene with Lucy and Aslan, in which Aslan assures a sobbing Lucy "that he's very much in her world, where he has 'another name'. and that "This was the very reason why (Lucy was) brought to Narnia, that by knowing (Aslan) here for a little, (she) may know (him) better there." This was in direct contradiction to the first two Narnia movies in which Christian reviewers felt that the director failed to grasp and accurately reproduce key sections and overriding themes from The Lion, The Witch, and the Wardrobe and Prince Caspian.

=== Commercial analysis ===
Brandon Gray of Box Office Mojo stated: "There certainly will be an audience for this picture, I just don't think it is going to restore the franchise to its former glory." He added that the film would be considered a relative success if it made anything close to Prince Caspian's box office numbers, which would increase the likelihood of further Narnia films.

"They got a little careless by taking the faith group for granted—and by neglecting it paid the price. We realized we couldn't make the same mistake. We've got to sell the film to everybody."

— Michael Apted on focusing The Voyage of the Dawn Treader to the Christian audiences

Mark Johnson, the producer of the Narnia films, later remarked that Prince Caspian "had strayed from its core audience," referring to the Christian and family audience who catapulted The Lion, the Witch and the Wardrobe to the top at the box office. Tom Rothman, co-chairman of Fox Filmed Entertainment, remarked, "We think this is a tremendously undervalued asset; we believe there is great life in the franchise." He feels the film is not just a single motion picture, but a re-launch of a movie series that still has long-term potential. He commented that Fox and Walden had engaged in talks about further potential Narnia films, though such discussions were made before the opening of Dawn Treader.

=== Box office performance ===
The film grossed $415.7 million worldwide, including $104.4 million in North America as well as $311.3 million in other territories. It is the 12th-highest-grossing film worldwide of 2010, as well as Fox's highest-grossing film of that year since, ahead of Knight and Day and Percy Jackson & the Olympians: The Lightning Thief.

The Voyage of the Dawn Treader opened in 3,555 theaters across the United States and Canada on December 10, 2010. On its opening day, the film grossed $8.3 million, which was far lower than the $23 million that The Lion, the Witch and the Wardrobe made on its opening day in 2005, and also much lower than Prince Caspian, which had an opening day gross of $19.4 million in 2008. Although The Voyage of the Dawn Treader debuted at #1 at the box office and grossed $24.0 million for its opening weekend, it was far less than the opening weekends of The Lion, the Witch and the Wardrobe ($65.6 million) and Prince Caspian ($55.0 million). Despite The Voyage of the Dawn Treader's disappointing opening weekend, Fox believed that word of mouth and the holiday season would help the film hold well. In its second weekend, The Voyage of the Dawn Treader dropped 48%, the smallest second-weekend drop in the franchise, and came in with $12.4 million, in third place to Tron: Legacy and Yogi Bear. During its third weekend, the 2010 Christmas weekend, The Voyage of the Dawn Treader dropped only 24%, the smallest decline among nationwide releases, and grossed $9.5 million. In the 2011 New Year's weekend, the film increased 8% from the previous weekend, grossing $10.3 million. On January 22, 2011, the film's forty-fourth day in theaters, The Voyage of the Dawn Treader became 20th Century Fox's first film to gross $100 million in the United States and Canada since Alvin and the Chipmunks: The Squeakquel crossed that mark in December 2009. However, it is the slowest Narnia film to reach $100 million in these regions, taking much longer than The Lion, the Witch and the Wardrobe (nine days) and Prince Caspian (thirteen days).

Overseas, the film performed better. On its limited opening weekend (Dec. 3–5, 2010), when it opened in only 9 territories (among them some limited releases), it earned $11.9 million, ranking 4th for the weekend. On its first weekend of wide release (Dec. 10–12, 2010), it expanded to 58 countries and topped the box office, earning $65.8 million, for an overseas total of $79.8 million. The film's biggest opening market was Russia, where it opened with $10.9 million (the best start for the franchise), including previews. It had the best opening for a Narnia film in Mexico ($7.1 million including previews) and South Korea ($5.3 million including previews). Its opening in the UK, a mere $3.9 million, was less than half of what Prince Caspian opened with and about a quarter of the first film's UK opening in 2005. However, the film held well throughout the holiday season in the UK, and on the weekend ending January 9, 2011 it outgrossed the £11,653,554 that Prince Caspian made in that region. It made £14,317,168 ($23,650,534) at the UK box office.

On its second weekend, it held the top spot at the box office but declined 53% to $31.2 million for an overseas total of $125.2 million. It fell to fifth place on the Christmas weekend ($23.1 million) and on New Year's weekend it went down to sixth place ($19.3 million) for an overseas total of $210.2 million. It eased 5% to $18.4 million from 53 markets on its fifth showing for a fourth-place finish. It had a major opening of $6.3 million in China, which was better than Prince Caspian's $3.9 million. On its 12th weekend (February 25–27), it surpassed Prince Caspian's foreign gross ($278 million) when it opened in Japan, with a $6.6 million gross, which is behind the first film's opening ($8.9 million) but better than the second film's ($5 million).

== Accolades ==
On December 14, 2010, The Hollywood Foreign Press Association nominated The Voyage of the Dawn Treader for the Golden Globe Award for Best Original Song ("There's a Place for Us") at the 68th Golden Globe Awards. Poulter received a nomination for Young British Performer of the Year at the 2010 London Film Critics Circle Awards. The film also received four nominations at the 37th Saturn Awards. It was awarded the Epiphany Prize as the Most Inspiring Movie of 2010.

Year	Award	Category/Recipient(s)	Result	Reference
2010	2010 London Film Critics Circle Awards	Young Performer of the Year (Will Poulter)	Nominated	
2010	2010 Art Directors Guild Awards	Excellence in Production Design for a Fantasy Feature Film	Nominated	
2011	68th Golden Globe Awards	Best Original Song ("There's a Place for Us")	Nominated	
2011	9th Annual Visual Effects Society Awards	Outstanding Animated Character in a Live Action Feature Motion Picture (Reepicheep)	Nominated	
2011	People's Choice Awards	Favorite 3D Live Action Movie	Won	
2011	2011 London Critics Circle Film Awards	Young British Performer of the Year (Will Poulter)	Nominated	
2011	32nd Young Artist Awards	Best Performance in a Feature Film – Young Ensemble Cast (Georgie Henley, Skander Keynes, Will Poulter)	Nominated	
2011	19th MovieGuide Faith and Values Awards	Most Inspiring Movie	Won	
2011	37th Saturn Awards	Best Fantasy Film	Nominated	
2011	37th Saturn Awards	Best Performance by a Younger Actor (Will Poulter)	Nominated	
2011	37th Saturn Awards	Best Costume	Nominated	
2011	37th Saturn Awards	Best Special Effects	Nominated	
2011	National Movie Awards	Fantasy	Nominated	
2011	National Movie Awards	Performance of the Year (Ben Barnes)	Nominated	
2011	National Movie Awards	Performance of the Year (Georgie Henley)	Nominated	

== Home media ==
20th Century Fox Home Entertainment released The Chronicles of Narnia: The Voyage of the Dawn Treader on Blu-ray and DVD on April 8, 2011. The release included a single-disc DVD, a two-disc DVD double pack, a single-disc Blu-ray, and a three-disc Blu-ray with DVD and Digital Copy.

Both the two-disc DVD double pack and the three-disc Blu-ray edition feature an animated short film entitled The Untold adventures of the Dawn Treader, a guide to the Dawn Treader, Narnian discovery featurettes, four featurettes aired on Fox Movie Channel, 5 minutes of deleted scenes, eight international music videos, a sword game, five island explorations, three behind-the-scenes featurettes entitled The Epic Continues, Portal to Narnia: A Painting Comes to Life & Good vs. Evil: Battle on the Sea and a visual effects progression reel. On October 9, 2020, the film became available for streaming on Disney+, following The Walt Disney Company's acquisition of 20th Century Fox in 2019.

=== Collector's Edition and Blu-ray 3D ===
20th Century Fox released the 3D Blu-ray version in the U.S. on August 30, 2011. Walden Media President Micheal Flaherty stated in an interview that 20th Century Fox Home Entertainment and Walt Disney Studios Home Entertainment are developing a collector's-edition box set DVD and Blu-ray containing the first three films.

== Future ==
=== Cancelled sequel ===
Walden Media's contract with the C. S. Lewis Company for the series' film rights had expired in 2011. In response, Douglas Gresham, a co-producer of the film, stated that if another film were to be made, it would not be for another three or four years. In October 2013, the C. S. Lewis Company announced that it had agreed with The Mark Gordon Company to adapt the 1953 novel The Silver Chair. Two months later, in December 2013, it was announced that David Magee would write the screenplay adaptation. By April 2017, Joe Johnston was announced to direct The Silver Chair.

=== Netflix reboot ===
On October 3, 2018, it was announced that Netflix and the C. S. Lewis Company had made a multi-year agreement to develop a new series of film and TV adaptations of The Chronicles of Narnia. This announcement was interpreted as superseding previously announced plans for The Silver Chair. On June 12, 2019, it was announced that Matthew Aldrich will serve as the creative architect and oversee the development of Narnia films and television for Netflix. In May 2020, Douglas Gresham expressed concern about the future of the project, stating he had not been contacted by Netflix in some time. In July 2023, it was announced that Greta Gerwig had been hired to write and direct at least two Narnia films for Netflix.
