= Underland (Narnia) =

Fictional place in the works of C. S. Lewis

- The Silver Chair location
- Created by: C. S. Lewis
- Genre: Children's fantasy

In-universe information
- Type: Subterranea
- Locations: Sunless Sea, Dark Castle
- Characters: Lady of the Green Kirtle, Earthmen, Father Time

Underland is a fictional location in the children's fantasy series The Chronicles of Narnia by C. S. Lewis. Described by Lewis as lying deep beneath the land of Narnia and high above the even deeper underworld of Bism. Underland appears mainly in The Silver Chair, where Eustace Scrubb, Jill Pole, and Puddleglum travel under the ground to reach it in their search for Prince Rilian. They find him in Underland and release him from his enchantment by the Lady of the Green Kirtle.

== The Search for Rilian ==
Jill, Eustace, and Puddleglum meet the Lady of the Green Kirtle at the Giants' bridge. She tells them to go to the Giants' house at the far north. On the way the three cross a hill with a maze of strange trenches. From the high vantage of the Giants' house, they see that the trenches are in fact letters, and recognize the phrase "Under Me" as one of the signs given by Aslan to guide their quest for Rilian. They determine to follow the directions and find a passage leading under the ground.

Underground they encounter the Warden of the Marches of Underland, accompanied by a hundred Earthmen (Gnomes) "of all sizes, from little gnomes barely a foot high to stately figures taller than men." The Earthmen escort them through many natural caverns ("each lower than the last") to the Dark Castle of the Lady of the Green Kirtle, the Queen of Underland. They pass many dead or sleeping animals like dragons from the Overworld, who, it is said, "will wake at the end of the world."

After many miles of travel underground, they pass a recumbent sleeping giant called Father Time. They are told that he was once a king in Overland, fallen into Underland, now dreaming of the Overworld; and like the animals they passed earlier, he too will waken at the end of the world.

The last stage of their journey takes them on board a ship, which is rowed across the vast underground Sunless Sea to the city where the Dark Castle lies. Many travellers from the Overworld have taken ship here, they are told, and few returns to sunlit lands. The recurring theme is that many unlucky inhabitants of Overland fall somehow into Underland, where they become trapped, and remain sleeping until the end of the world. Underland is pervaded by silence; amongst the sleepers from above, the Earthmen work diligently but quietly.

== Rilian's escape ==
When Rilian is rescued and the Queen killed, Rilian and the others seek to find a way back to the Overworld. Rilian knows of a new passage on this side of the Sunless Sea, that the Earthmen have dug recently in preparation for the Queen's intended invasion of Narnia. They fear being apprehended by the Earthmen, but commotion breaks through the silence, and they discover that the Earthmen too have been trapped in Underland by the Queen's magic. Now that she is dead, the Earthmen are freed from their task of preparing her invasion, and they return gleefully to their own home, the land of Bism.

Bism, far beneath Underland, glows with volcanic heat. As Golg, their Earthman guide, leads them past the opening to Bism, the travelers look down into it and make out a river of fire where Salamanders swim, alongside groves and fields of many colors, not unlike a stained glass window. Lewis describes Bism as a place of beauty for the Gnomes, who desire to reach it as much as Rilian and his companions want to reach the Overland. Golg describes the living riches of Bism as far outstripping the "dead" gold and jewels that Overlanders find in their shallow mines. Rilian is torn with the desire to see this land, but the rift between Underland and Bism is about to close, and the Gnomes hurry to be on the correct side. Rilian and his companions escape to the surface through the tunnel dug by the Earthmen.

== Narnian Territory ==
After Caspian X's death, Rilian has been crowned the new king of Narnia.

== See also ==
- List of characters in The Chronicles of Narnia
- The Silver Chair
- Narnia (world)
