= Fred Paxford =

English gardener and handyman

Frederick William Calcut Paxford (5 August 1898, Fifield, Oxfordshire – 10 August 1979, Churchill, Oxfordshire) was C. S. Lewis's gardener and handyman at The Kilns from 1930 until Lewis's death in 1963. He is said to have been the inspiration for Puddleglum the Marsh-Wiggle in The Silver Chair in the Chronicles of Narnia: "an inwardly optimistic, outwardly pessimistic, dear, frustrating, shrewd countryman of immense integrity."

Paxford, an Oxfordshire countryman, was born the same year as Lewis and had been gassed as a soldier during World War I. He had been working at The Kilns when Lewis bought the property in 1930 and hired him as a gardener and factotum. Paxford spent several years clearing the grounds and establishing an orchard and vegetable garden. He acted as a chauffeur to Lewis, who could not drive, and did the shopping for the household with a great sense of economy. He sang hymns in a loud voice, much to the annoyance of the neighbours, "but it was the incessant gloominess of his predictions, especially about the weather, that caught people's attention and led to his employment as the model for Puddleglum the Marsh-Wiggle in The Silver Chair."

Douglas Gresham, Lewis's stepson, wrote of Paxford:

He spoke with a slow burring Cotswold drawl; and if he could find nothing good to say about someone he would say nothing about them at all. . . He drove cars steadily and well and could be trusted with any task to which you put him. He was also a man who had been brought up with strong principles, and honesty and loyalty were two things that he loved and admired and stuck to all his life. . . . Another fact of his personality was that he was always ready to say the most depressing things and apparently to take the gloomiest attitude to everything while at the same time to expect everything to turn out well. I have a sneaking suspicion that he voiced the worst possible thoughts about things to protect himself and others from their actually happening.

A lifelong bachelor, Paxford died in 1979 aged 81 in his home in Churchill. His reminiscences about Lewis (along with those of others) have been published in a collected volume.

In the 1985 TV movie Shadowlands, Fred Paxford is played by Norman Rutherford, and in the 1993 movie Shadowlands, he is played by Walter Sparrow.
