= Lady of the Green Kirtle =

Fictional witch or sorceress, antagonist of The Silver Chair (Narnia, book 4)

- Narnia character

In-universe information
- Race: Unknown (Northern Witch)
- Title: Queen of Underland
- Nationality: Underland

The Lady of the Green Kirtle is the main antagonist in The Silver Chair by C. S. Lewis. She enslaved Prince Rilian of Narnia and a horde of gnomes by her witchcraft, and planned to use them to take over Narnia. She is foiled by three friends of Aslan: Eustace Scrubb, Jill Pole, and Puddleglum, and is finally killed by Rilian.

== Overview ==
The Green Lady has kidnapped Prince Rilian, son of King Caspian X, and has fatally poisoned his mother, Ramandu's daughter. The Lady plans to conquer Narnia from underground, using the enslaved prince as her general.

She understands that Eustace, Jill, and Puddleglum have been sent to rescue Rilian, and meets them as they head north from Narnia. She slyly directs them to the giants' castle Harfang for the Autumn Feast, and ask them to explain that she salutes the giants via them. This, because she knows that "man-pies" are a traditional dish for their Autumn Feast and an easy way to get rid of her adversaries.

When the three unexpectedly turn up instead in her own domain, she attempts to dull their senses and critical thinking through hypnotic magic. She very nearly convinces them that neither Narnia nor the Earth truly exist, but Puddleglum successfully counters the illusion.

Finally, she uses her shape-shifting skill to transform into a gigantic green serpent. Prince Rilian recognizes her serpent form as the same one that killed his mother ten years earlier and after a brief struggle, strikes off her head.

== The Green Lady and the White Witch ==
The story never makes clear who the Green Lady really is or where she comes from. The Silver Chair includes her among several "Northern Witches", a group that evidently also includes Jadis, the White Witch. Some readers believe that Jadis and the Lady of the Green Kirtle are the same person. Jadis, however, is slain by Aslan centuries earlier in The Lion, the Witch, and the Wardrobe, and Lewis never describes her being brought back to life.

The speculation is probably reinforced by the set of character sketches included in some later editions of the books. One sketch describes Jadis as "completely evil, even in The Silver Chair." Since it is the Lady of the Green Kirtle who appears in The Silver Chair, some conclude that this must refer to the Green Lady. This theory has influenced adaptations of the books; for example, actress Barbara Kellerman portrayed both the White Witch and the Lady of the Green Kirtle in the BBC series The Chronicles of Narnia. Nonetheless, the character sketches are recent additions to the books; they were not written by Lewis, and in this regard, are not supported by Lewis's text. Lewis scholar Peter Schakel even writes that the character sketch "states incorrectly that the Queen of Underland is an embodiment of Jadis".

The mechanics of how Jadis could return are never made clear, since she is killed at the end of The Lion, the Witch and the Wardrobe, her last chronological appearance in the books. In Prince Caspian, Nikabrik and his companions suggest that the White Witch could be resurrected – "who ever heard of a witch that really died?" In Lewis's text this plan is never put to the test, though the Walden Media film adaptation introduces a rite that begins to pull Jadis back to life before the spell is broken. The Magician's Nephew, written as a prequel to the Narnia series, relates that Jadis gained immortality by eating a magic apple; but most of this prequel was written after Prince Caspian was finished. While it is possible that Lewis meant this to give a route to reincarnating Jadis, the text never follows up on it.

== Literary inspirations ==
Carina Rumberger-Yanda suggests that the Lady of the Green Kirtle may be associated with the eponymous character of John Keats's Lamia. Like Lamia, the Lady is sometimes a snake, and sometimes "a maid / More beautiful than ever... Spread a green kirtle."

Her transformation into a serpent:

Her arms appeared to be fastened to her sides. Her legs were intertwined with each other, and her feet had disappeared. The long green train of her skirt thickened and grew solid, and seemed to be all one piece with the writhing green pillar of her interlocked legs.

echoes the description of Satan's transformation in Milton's Paradise Lost:

His Armes clung to his Ribs, his Leggs entwining
Each other, till supplanted down he fell
A monstrous Serpent on his Belly prone...

== Adaptations ==
The Lady of the Green Kirtle, as portrayed by Barbara Kellerman in the BBC miniseries The Chronicles of Narnia

In the 1990 BBC production of The Chronicles of Narnia, Lady of the Green Kirtle was portrayed by Barbara Kellerman, the same actress who played the White Witch.

In the 2010 film The Chronicles of Narnia: The Voyage of the Dawn Treader, the DVD commentary states that the power behind the Green Mist was the Lady of the Green Kirtle, even though she is not shown in the film.

In July 2014, the official Narnia website allowed fans the opportunity to name the Lady of the Green Kirtle. The winning name was to be selected by Mark Gordon and David Magee for use in the cancelled film version of The Silver Chair.
