= Maugrim =

Fictional character, head wolf in the service of the White Witch (Narnia, book 1)

- Narnia character
- Maugrim as depicted by Leo and Diane Dillon

In-universe information
- Race: Talking Grey wolf
- Gender: Male
- Title: Captain of the Secret Police
- Nationality: Narnian

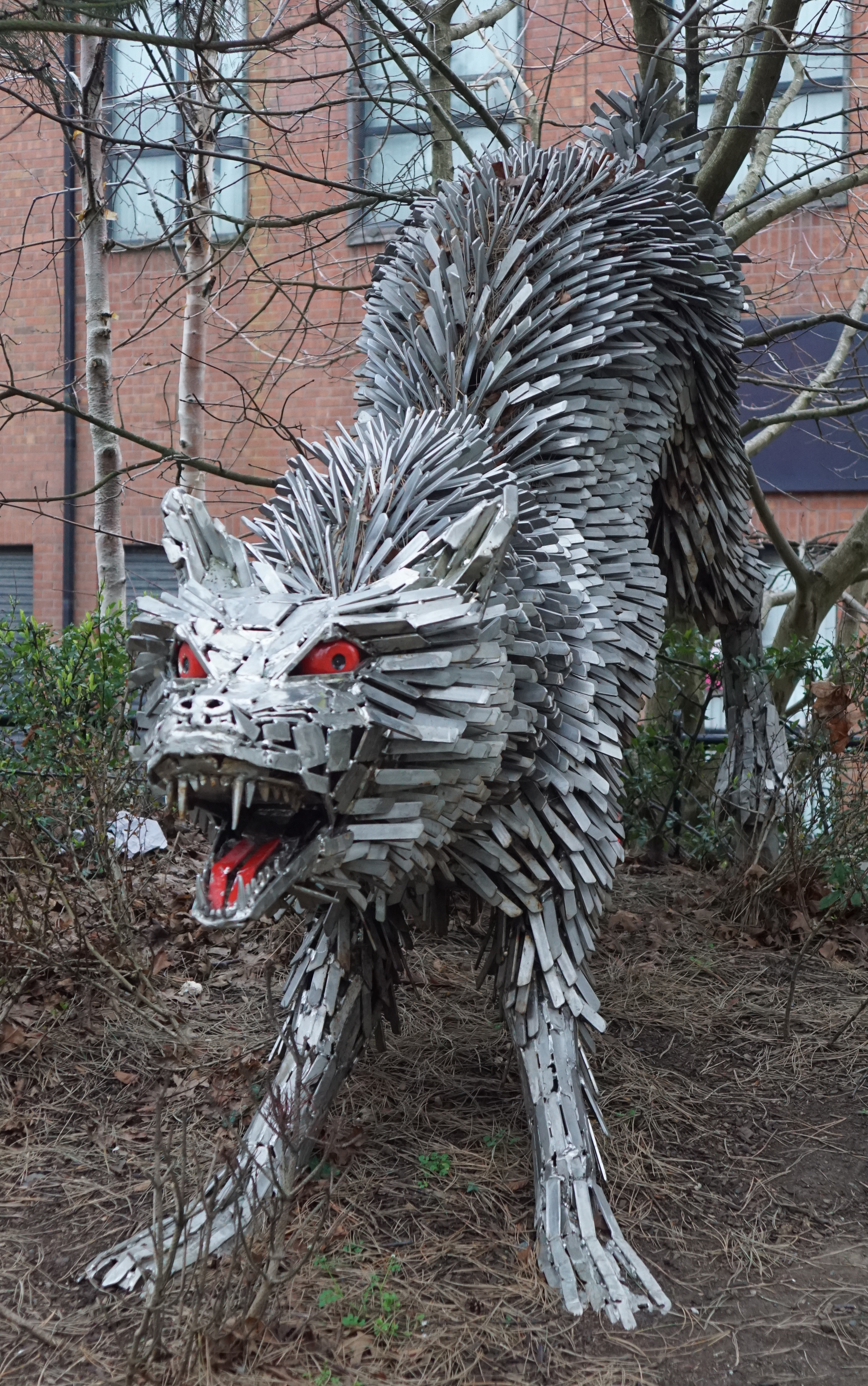
Maugrim sculpture (by Maurice Harron (2016), CS Lewis Square, Belfast)

Maugrim is a fictional character in the 1950 novel The Lion, the Witch and the Wardrobe by C. S. Lewis. A Narnian wolf, he is the Captain of the White Witch's Secret Police. In early American editions of the book, Lewis changed the name to Fenris Ulf (a reference to Fenrisúlfr, a wolf from Norse mythology), but when HarperCollins took over the books they took out Lewis' revisions, and the name Maugrim has been used in all editions since 1994.

Maugrim is one of the few Talking Animals who sided with the Witch during the Hundred-Year Winter. Nikabrik in Prince Caspian indicates that Narnian wolves have no loyalty to the lion Aslan.

== History ==
=== In The Lion, the Witch and the Wardrobe ===
Maugrim is first mentioned when the Pevensie children arrive at Mr. Tumnus's ransacked cave, announcing the faun's arrest by the Secret Police for not handing over Lucy Pevensie to the White Witch.

He is first seen when guarding the entrance to the White Witch's castle; he takes Edmund's message to the witch and allows him to enter the castle.

Maugrim is subsequently described as "a huge grey beast – its eyes flaming – far too big to be a dog".

The White Witch then sends Maugrim and the fastest of his wolves to the Beavers' house, to "kill whatever they find there", and to make "all speed" to the Stone Table if the Beavers and Edmund's siblings have already left. The wolves find the house empty, and the harshness of the witch's imposed winter prevents them from finding any tracks or scent.

As instructed, they head through the snowy night until they reach the Stone Table to wait for the witch, but by the time they reach it, the snow has melted and the witch has been forced to continue on foot.

As Aslan's army assembles near the Stone Table, Maugrim pounces out of the bushes and attacks Susan Pevensie, and is killed by Peter Pevensie, for which the latter is given the title "Sir Peter Wolfsbane". Aslan's creatures then follow Maugrim's subordinate wolf to the White Witch, enabling them to rescue Edmund.

When informed about Maugrim's death, the White Witch sends the same wolf to rally her army so that they can meet her at her current position as speedily as they can.

=== In Prince Caspian ===
Maugrim is mentioned in Prince Caspian when Peter retrieves his sword from the treasury of Cair Paravel, stating, "It is my sword Rhindon ... with it, I killed the Wolf".

== Media appearances ==
- In the 1967 TV serial, Maugrim was portrayed by Robert Booth.
- In the 1979 animated adaptation, the character is named "Fenris Ulf" (the name used in early U.S. editions of the book).
- Maugrim, as portrayed by Martin Stone in The Chronicles of Narnia
  Maugrim appears in the 1988 BBC production on The Chronicles of Narnia, portrayed by Canadian actor Martin Stone. He assumes the form of a humanoid wolf-like creature when speaking or fighting, and an actual wolf when standing guard at the Witch's castle, traveling, or mortally wounded. As in the book, he is killed by Peter after appearing at the Stone Table, where he has been sent on the White Witch's orders after Edmund informs her than his siblings and Aslan have reached Narnia.
- Martin Stone returned a year later in Prince Caspian as the werewolf who Peter and Edmund Pevensie killed, alongside a hag (played by Barbara Kellerman, who had previously played the White Witch) and the dwarf Nikabrik, who had enlisted their help in an attempt to resurrect the White Witch as part of the battle to defeat the evil Narnian ruler King Miraz – who was indeed an evil ruler, but in the words of Caspian (Miraz's own nephew) the Witch was "the cruelest enemy of all – a tyrant a hundred times worse than Miraz himself".
- Maugrim, as portrayed in The Chronicles of Narnia: The Lion, the Witch and the Wardrobe
  Maugrim appears in the 2005 motion picture The Chronicles of Narnia: The Lion, the Witch and the Wardrobe, voiced by Michael Madsen. In sequences invented for the film, Maugrim and his wolves attempt to intimidate a red fox into revealing the children's whereabouts after they leave the Beavers' house. Maugrim and another wolf finally encounter the Pevensies at Aslan's camp where he attempts to attack Susan and Lucy. While Aslan pins the wolf down and holds some members of his army back, Peter duels with Maugrim, who taunts Peter, citing an earlier confrontation (at a river that had been defrosted, where Peter did not have the courage to kill Maugrim), but Peter kills him as in the book and the earlier BBC adaptation.
- Maugrim is mentioned in Susanne Sundfør's song "Turkish Delight" from her second album The Brothel.

== See also ==
- G'mork
- List of individual wolves
