= Alice (1988 film) =

1988 film

- Czechoslovak theatrical release poster
- Directed by: Jan Švankmajer
- Screenplay by: Jan Švankmajer
- Based on: Alice's Adventures in Wonderland by Lewis Carroll
- Produced by: Peter-Christian Fueter
- Starring: Kristýna Kohoutová
- Cinematography: Svatopluk Malý
- Edited by: Marie Zemanová
- Production companies: Film Four International; Condor Films
- Distributed by: First Run Features
- Release dates: August 3, 1988 (United States); November 1, 1990 (Czechoslovakia)
- Running time: 86 minutes
- Countries: Czechoslovakia; Switzerland; United Kingdom; West Germany
- Language: Czech

Alice is a 1988 surrealist dark fantasy film written and directed by Jan Švankmajer. Its original Czech title is Něco z Alenky, which means "Something from Alice". It is a loose adaptation of Lewis Carroll's first Alice book, Alice's Adventures in Wonderland (1865), about a girl who chases a white rabbit into a bizarre fantasy land. Alice is played by Kristýna Kohoutová. The film combines live-action with stop-motion animation, and is distinguished by its dark production-design.

For Švankmajer, a prolific director of short films for more than two decades, Alice became his first venture into feature-length filmmaking. The director had been disappointed by other adaptations of Carroll's book, which interpret it as a fairy tale. His aim was instead to make the story play out like an amoral dream. The film won the feature-film-award at the 1989 Annecy International animated Film Festival.

== Plot ==
Alice is sitting by a brook with her sister, throwing rocks in the water. Later, she is in her sitting room, throwing rocks into a cup of tea. A creaking noise draws her attention to a taxidermic white rabbit in a glass case. Alice hides beneath a writing desk while the Rabbit comes alive, dressing himself and retrieving a pair of scissors from a hidden drawer, which he uses to smash the case, freeing himself.

Alice chases the Rabbit into a writing desk on top of a hill; crawling into the drawer after him, she soon finds herself in a cellar. She accidentally falls backwards into a dustbin and finds herself in an elevator that takes her past all sorts of objects on shelves. The elevator stops and deposits her atop a pile of leaves. The leaves begin to stir on their own, revealing another desk in which Alice finds a tiny key. Alice uses the key to open a miniature door, through which she sees the Rabbit disappear into a painted garden; she herself is too large to fit through the door. She finds an unlabeled bottle of a dark, inky liquid. Drinking it changes her into a little china doll in her likeness. She then finds a kolach that causes her to grow large, again rendering her unable to fit through the door. Frustrated, Alice cries until the room floods with tears. The White Rabbit rows by, dropping a tray of tarts. Eating one returns Alice to her doll size and she is able to retrieve the key and chase the Rabbit.

Once through the door, Alice finds herself at the banks of a brook and encounters the White Rabbit, who mistakes her for his maid and commands her to fetch scissors from his house. Inside, she drinks from another ink bottle and returns to her true size, trapping her inside the now too-small house. The Rabbit and his animal companions try to force her out by sending a skull-headed lizard through the chimney. Alice kicks him away, causing him to burst and spill his sawdust innards. The furious animals imprison Alice inside an Alice-shaped doll shell, which they lock inside a storage room filled with specimen jars.

Alice breaks free of the doll shell and discovers a key inside a sardine can. She uses the key to escape the storage room, stepping into a hall of doors. Behind one of them, she meets a stocking-Caterpillar in a room swarming with sock-worms that bore holes in the floor. The Caterpillar tells her that eating one piece of his darning mushroom causes things to grow, while the other piece causes things to shrink. Alice follows the sound of a screaming baby to a tiny dollhouse, which she enlarges by eating a piece of the mushroom. She discovers the Rabbit inside tending a piglet in baby's clothes. The Rabbit escapes while Alice chases the piglet downstairs, where a mechanical tea party is being hosted by a wind-up March Hare and a marionette Hatter. The Rabbit runs away to the attic and Alice chases.

Behind a curtain of clothes, Alice reaches the painted garden. The King and Queen of Hearts march into the garden with a troop of playing cards. The Queen commands the White Rabbit to behead two fencing Jacks, among others; he does so with his scissors. The Queen invites Alice to play croquet, but Alice becomes angry when the mallets and balls turn into chickens and hedgehogs. In a courtroom, she is put on trial for eating the Queen's tarts. Alice tries to explain herself but the King commands her to follow a script. Annoyed, Alice starts eating the tarts and the Queen demands Alice's head. Alice asks "Which one?", and her head morphs into the heads of the other characters. The Queen demands all her heads be severed, and the Rabbit advances with his scissors.

Alice wakes in her sitting-room. Around the room are the various household objects that populated her dream: Playing-cards, china dolls, marionettes, an inkwell, and socks in a sewing-basket. The case that formerly contained the taxidermic rabbit is still broken and empty. Opening the hidden drawer in the case, she finds the White Rabbit's scissors. Examining the scissors, Alice thinks to herself, "He's late, as usual. I think I'll cut his head off".

== Cast ==
- Kristýna Kohoutová as Alice.
  - In addition to being a character within the film itself, Alice also serves as the narrator throughout its entirety, and all the other characters are voiced by her. After every line of dialogue, a close-up of Alice's mouth is shown saying "said (insert character's name)". For example, the Queen of Hearts would say "now off with their heads" in Alice's voice, and Alice's mouth is shown saying "said the Queen of Hearts".

In Alice's English version:

- Camilla Power as Alice's voice

== Production ==
Jan Švankmajer, who had been making short films since the mid-1960s, says he got the confidence to make a feature-length film after finishing the shorts Jabberwocky and Down to the Cellar. He described Lewis Carroll's Alice's Adventures in Wonderland, a work which had followed him since he was a child, as "one of the most important and amazing books produced by this civilization". He argued that other film-adaptations of the story had interpreted it as a fairy tale, but that Carroll had written it like a dream, and that was what he wanted to transmit: "While a fairy tale has got an educational aspect - it works with the moral of the lifted forefinger (good overcomes evil), dream, as an expression of our unconscious, uncompromisingly pursues the realization of our most-secret wishes without considering rational and moral inhibitions, because it is driven by the principle of pleasure. My Alice is a realized dream." Despite the film's heavy usage of stop-motion, and unlike most other traditional stop-motion-films, the film does not utilize any miniature-sets to portray its special effects.

== Release ==
The film premiered in the United States, where it was released on August 3, 1988. It played at the 1989 Annecy International animated Film Festival where it received the prize for best feature-film. In Czechoslovakia it premiered on November 1, 1990. The English-dubbed version features the voice of Camilla Power.

=== Critical response ===
In The New York Times, Caryn James wrote that although Švankmajer "strips away all sweetness and light, he does not violate Lewis Carroll's story", and called Alice an "extraordinary film [which] explores the story's dark undercurrents". James described the animation as "remarkably fluid" and held forward the dynamics of the film, which contrasts visually captivating elements with superficiality: "Mr. Švankmajer never lets us forget we are watching a film in which an actress plays Alice telling a story", although, "with its extreme close-ups, its constant motion and its smooth animation, the film is so visually active that it distracts us from a heavy-handed fact - this is a world of symbols come alive". Upon the British home-media release in 2011, Philip Horne reviewed the film for The Daily Telegraph. Horne called it "an astonishing film", and wrote: "This is no cleaned up version approved by preview audiences or committees of studio executives - my youthful fellow-spectator declared quite aptly at one point, 'She's rather a violent young girl, isn't she?' - but its glorious proliferation of magical transformations works like a charm on anyone who values the imagination." The review aggregator Rotten Tomatoes has Alice with a "Fresh" rating of 95% based on 19 reviews.

=== Home media ===
The film with original Czech audio and English subtitles was unavailable on home video until 2011 when the British Film Institute released the film on DVD and Blu-ray.
