= Bodiam Manor School =

Location
- Bodiam Road; Bodiam, East Sussex, TN32 5UJ; England
- Coordinates: 51.0054°N 0.5372°E

Information
- Type: Independent day prep school
- Mottoes: Vitae Discimus (We Learn For Life)
- Religious affiliation: C of E
- Closed: 2010
- Head teacher: Graeme Owton
- Staff: 40
- Gender: Coeducational
- Age: 3 to 13
- Enrolment: 100

Bodiam Manor School was founded more than 50 years ago and was an Independent Preparatory School for children aged 3 to 13 years old, very close to the East Sussex village of Bodiam. It was co-educational. Set in 10 acres (40,000 m^{2}) of land, and housed in an old Manor House, (hence the name) the school closed, 11 August 2010 due to falling pupil numbers and an inability to meet financial commitments. It was succeeded by Claremont Senior School.
