= Ailsa Berk =

British actress

- Occupation: Actress
- Years active: 1983–present

Ailsa Berk is a British dancer, actress, and puppeteer.

She is well known for performing the puppetry for Aslan on British television with William Todd-Jones in The Chronicles of Narnia television serial which was aired by the BBC from 1988 to 1990.

Berk has been a choreographer in a number of episodes of Doctor Who from 2005 to 2009. She has appeared on six episodes of Doctor Who Confidential and two episodes of Totally Doctor Who as herself.

== Filmography/television work ==
Year	Film	Role	Notes
1983	Return of the Jedi	Amanaman (Jabba's Bounty Hunter)	Uncredited
1984	Greystoke: The Legend of Tarzan, Lord of the Apes	Kala, Primate Mother	
1985	Return to Oz	Wheeler	
1986	Max mon amour	Max	Uncredited
1988	The Storyteller	Grovelhog	Television, one episode
1988–1990	The Chronicles of Narnia	Aslan (puppet, front legs and head)	Television
1993	Little Buddha	Elephant Performer	
1996	Gulliver's Travels	Yahoo Consultant	Television
1997	Fierce Creatures	Panda Performer	
2000	The 10th Kingdom	Evil Stepmother's Skeleton	Television, two episodes
2005 - 2009	Doctor Who (various episodes)	Choreographer/monster movement	Television, twenty episodes
2007	Warum Männer nicht zuhören und Frauen schlecht einparken		

== Miscellaneous work ==
- Doctor Who (40 +episodes) - choreographer 2005 - 2017
- Doctor Who Confidential as herself (6 episodes, 2006–2008)
- Totally Doctor Who as herself (2 episodes, 2007)
- Max mon amour (1986 The role of Max )
- Classic Creatures: Return of the Jedi (1983) (TV) (uncredited) as herself/Amanaman
- Return of the Jedi (1983) (mime artist: "Amanaman")
