= Camilla Power =

British actress

- Born: Camilla Joy Cynthia Power; 13 November 1976 (age 49); Cork, Ireland
- Education: Sylvia Young Theatre School
- Occupation: Actress
- Years active: 1988–present
- Known for: Emmerdale; Waterloo Road; The Silver Chair
- Children: 1
- Relatives: Tyrone Power (distant cousin); Sir John Power (great-grandfather)

Camilla Joy Cynthia Power (born 13 November 1976) is an Irish-born English actress. She is best known for her appearances in the television series Emmerdale and Waterloo Road.

== Early life and education ==
Power was born in Cork, Ireland, and is a distant cousin of the actor Tyrone Power. Her great-grandfather was Sir John Power, Member of Parliament for Wimbledon before the Second World War. She attended the Sylvia Young Theatre School in Marylebone, and started acting from an early age; her first TV appearance was on a chicken nuggets commercial, and an early screen role was as Sabina Halliday in A Summer Story (1988).

== Career ==
Power appeared in Channel 4’s The Manageress in 1990, and played Jill Pole in BBC Television's The Silver Chair (1990), an adaptation of the book by C. S. Lewis. She also had parts in Bonjour la Classe (1993), and Moonacre (BBC, 1993), the last calling for skill at horse-riding. From 1993 to 1995, she was a regular cast member playing Jessica McAllister on the Yorkshire Television soap Emmerdale.

From 1997 to 1998, she played teenager Adele Bannerman in The Grand, a series set at the "Grand hotel", Manchester in the 1920s. Power made her stage debut in a theatrical adaptation of The Prime of Miss Jean Brodie at the National Theatre in 1998. She had roles in the television drama series Murder in Mind (2002), and in the 2003 film Hornblower: Duty.

In 2006, she appeared in the BBC One school-based drama series Waterloo Road as English teacher Lorna Dickey, and returned for the second series in 2007, until her character committed suicide after being diagnosed with multiple sclerosis. In early 2008 she starred in the Torchwood, episode "From Out of the Rain" as Pearl, a circus star who escapes from an old cinema film and seeks revenge on those who put her out of business. Power was seen in the British action movie The Tournament, as the ruthless assistant to Liam Cunningham's Tournament Master. In 2012, she appeared in two episodes of ITV drama Whitechapel.

In 2013, she appeared in two episodes of Lewis, as Tara Faulkner, and in two episodes of Father Brown. In 2016, she appeared in "Shut Up and Dance", an episode of the anthology series Black Mirror. In 2022, she appeared as Agatha Jack in Trigger Point.

== Filmography ==
=== Film ===
Year	Film	Role	Notes
1988	A Summer Story	Sabina Halliday	
1988	Alice	Alice	English version
1988	Soft Soap	Trace	Television film
1989	Not the End of the World	Ellen	Television film
1991	Mystery of the Keys	Alex	Television film
1996	The Treasure Seekers	Dora Bastable	Television film
1996	Throwaways	Sky	Television film
2000	The Calling	Lynette Peterson	
2003	Duty	Betsy	Television film
2003	Byron	Lady Caroline Lamb	Television film
2004	Not Only But Always	Judy Huxtable	Television film
2009	The Tournament	Sarah Hunter	
2016	The Other Side of Home	Karen	Short film
2016	Truck	Alison	Short film
2018	Final Score	Mrs. Steed	

=== Television ===
Year	Title	Role	Notes
1989	The Manageress	Young Gabriella	Episode: "A Man's Game"
1990	The Silver Chair	Jill Pole	Series regular; 6 episodes
1993	The Bill	Anna Burwell	Episode: "Questionable Judgement"
1993	Bonjour la Classe	Pamela Slotover	Series regular; 6 episodes
1993	10x10	Anna	Episode: "Physics for Fish"
1993–1995	Emmerdale	Jessica McAllister	Series regular; 103 episodes
1994	Moonacre	Maria Merryweather	Miniseries; 6 episodes
1995	Casualty	Angie	Episode: "Hit and Run"
1996	The Bill	Shelley Harker	Episode: "Separate Rooms"
1996	Beck	Charity	Recurring role; 3 episodes
1997	The Ruth Rendell Mysteries	Lisa / Zoe	Episode: "The Double"
1997	Scene	Girl	Episode: "Stone Cold"
1997	Underworld	Gilda Smith	Miniseries; 6 episodes
1997–1998	The Grand	Adele Bannerman	Recurring role; 10 episodes
1998	Slap! - Love, Lies and Lipstick	Annabel	Series regular; 7 episodes
1998	The Echo	Lisa	Miniseries; 1 episode
2000	Fish	Jilly McVee	Episode: "Another Shade of White"
2000	Up Rising	Ariadne	Miniseries; 5 episodes
2001	Perfect Strangers	Martina	Miniseries; 3 episodes
2002	Manchild	Scarlet	Recurring role; 3 episodes
2002	Murder in Mind	Emily Stapleford	Episode: "Victim"
2002	The Inspector Lynley Mysteries	Joanna Sydeham	Episode: "Payment in Blood"
2002	Sparkhouse	Becky Lawton	Miniseries; 2 episodes
2003	Trevor's World of Sport	Mariella Boden	Episode: "Jason"
2005	The Brief	Millie Marsh	Recurring role; 4 episodes
2006	Brief Encounters	Dorathy	Episode: "All in a Day's Work"
2006–2007	Waterloo Road	Lorna Dickey	Series regular; 18 episodes
2008	Torchwood	Pearl	Episode: "From Out of the Rain"
2008	Harley Street	Lucy	Episode: "Episode 4"
2011	Doctors	Elsa Atherton	Episode: "Charade"
2011	Injustice	Caroline Newall	Miniseries; 2 episodes
2012	Whitechapel	DI Mina Norroy	Recurring role; 2 episodes
2013	Father Brown	Dominique Baxter	Episode: "The Eye of Apollo"
2013	Lewis	Tara Faulkner	Episode: "The Ramblin' Boy"
2016	Black Mirror	Sandra	Episode: "Shut Up and Dance"
2021	Showtrial	Cressida Campbell	Recurring role; 3 episodes
2022	Trigger Point	Agatha Jack	Recurring role; 2 episodes
