= Jeffrey Perry (British actor) =

English actor (1948–2012)

- Born: Jeffrey Harvey Perry; 16 November 1948; Barrow-in-Furness, Lancashire, England
- Died: 4 February 2012 (aged 63); Stanhoe, Norfolk, England
- Occupation: Actor
- Years active: 1971–2012

Jeffrey Harvey Perry (16 November 1948 – 4 February 2012) was an English stage and screen actor. Born in Barrow-in-Furness, Lancashire and trained at the Guildhall School of Music and Drama, he worked extensively for the Royal Exchange in Manchester. He may be best known to television audiences as Mr. Tumnus in the 1988 version of The Lion, the Witch, and the Wardrobe, which was part of the BBC's Chronicles of Narnia TV miniseries.

In the 2000s, Perry's work included performances at the Mill at Sonning. In the summer of 2008, he played Mr. Mole in Love's a Luxury. He was also a director of NOT The National Theatre and toured with them, appearing in several productions.

== Selected stage and screen credits ==
=== Television ===
- The Lion, the Witch, and the Wardrobe (as Mr. Tumnus), 1988
- Micawber (as Clerk), 2001

=== Theatre ===
- Hard Times, NOT The National Theatre, 1990-1991
- Playing Sinatra (as Norman), NOT The National Theatre, 1999
- Time and Time Again (as Leonard), The Mill at Sonning
- All for Mary (as Humphrey Millar), The Mill at Sonning, 2001
- Hysteria (as Sigmund Freud), NOT The National Theatre, 2002
- Strictly Murder (as Josef), The Mill at Sonning, 2006
- Love's a Luxury (as Mr. Mole), The Mill at Sonning, 2008
