= David Thwaites =

British actor and producer (born 1976)

- Born: David Barry Thwaites; 16 June 1976 (age 50); Wandsworth, London, England, UK
- Occupations: Actor; Producer
- Years active: 1989 – present

David Barry Thwaites (born 16 June 1976) is a British actor and producer. In 1989, aged 13, he appeared as Eustace Scrubb in the BBC's adaptation of The Voyage of the Dawn Treader. A year later he reprised this role in The Silver Chair (1990). Now living in Los Angeles, he is a producer and served as executive producer on All the King's Men, License to Wed and Black Swan, and producer on Miss Potter.

== Filmography ==
=== Film ===
Year	Title	Role	Notes
1992	Jewels	Philip (age 16)	
1996	Over Here	Burns	

=== Television ===
Year	Title	Role	Notes
1989	Prince Caspian/The Voyage of the Dawn Treader	Eustace Scrubb	Cameo; Episode: "Prince Caspian Part 2"
1990	The Silver Chair	Eustace Scrubb	
1993	Bonjour la Classe	St. Bernard's Player	Episode: "Red Card"
1993	The Lodge	Pud	9 episodes
1996	Over Here	Robbie Burns	
