= Puddleglum =

Fictional character in The Chronicles of Narnia

- Narnia character
- Tom Baker as Puddleglum in the BBC serial The Silver Chair

In-universe information
- Race: Marsh-wiggle
- Nationality: Narnia

Puddleglum is a fictional character in the children's fantasy series The Chronicles of Narnia by C. S. Lewis. Puddleglum appears as a principal character in The Silver Chair, and is mentioned briefly at the end of The Last Battle. Puddleglum is a "Marsh-wiggle", a species invented by Lewis which appears only in this book, and the only Marsh-wiggle given a name or any lines of dialogue. He is gloomy and pessimistic and described by other characters as a "wet blanket", although by his account other Marsh-wiggles are gloomier still.

Lewis said that his gardener Fred Paxford served as a model for Puddleglum.

== Name ==
Lewis drew the name "Puddleglum" from the works of the 16th-century poet John Studley, specifically his translation of Seneca's Phaedra, which at one point renders tacitae Stygis ("of silent Styx") as "from Stygian puddle glum". In his book English Literature in the Sixteenth Century, Lewis cited this (along with "frostyface" and "topsy turvy") as an instance of Studley's habit of using unintentionally comical phrases in otherwise serious works. The name can be viewed as a concatenation of "puddle", for Puddleglum's association with water and wetlands, and "glum", describing his outlook on life.

== Appearance ==
Puddleglum first appears in chapter 5 of The Silver Chair as the companion of Eustace and Jill as they search for Prince Rilian, heir to the Narnian throne, who disappeared 10 years earlier. He is a caricature of pessimism and a bastion of gloomy fortitude: "I see you're making the best of a bad job. That's right. You've been well brought up, you have. You've learned to put a good face on things." But in the end Lewis gives readers a small sign that maybe spending time with Eustace and Jill has had an effect on him. After Jill surprises him with a farewell hug (and kiss), Puddleglum remarks, "Well, I wouldn't have dreamt of her doing that. Even though I am a good-looking chap."

While the children initially (and not entirely without merit) consider him a "wet blanket" who removes the good from any situation, he proves to be a strong and steadfast companion, especially in Underland where he is all they have to cling to. It is Puddleglum who often spots the best course of action, and ultimately Puddleglum who wins the debate with the Lady of the Green Kirtle, breaking her spell and releasing the Prince by stamping out her magical fire (badly injuring his foot in the process, though not as much as a normal human would, since his feet are webbed). She reacts furiously and turns into a serpent, only to be killed by Rilian. Puddleglum then joins Rilian and the two children on their escape from the Underworld to Narnia.

== Christian elements ==
Lewis, himself an expert on allegory, did not consider The Chronicles of Narnia allegory. He saw them as "suppositional" answering the question, "What might Christ become like, if there really were a world like Narnia and He chose to be incarnate and die and rise again in that world as He actually has done in ours?' This is not allegory at all." While not allegorical, Narnia does present significant parallels with elements from Christianity.

Lewis is perhaps using Puddleglum to give a somewhat existential statement of faith when he writes, "Suppose we have only dreamed, or made up, all of those things—trees and grass and sun and moon and stars and Aslan himself. Suppose we have. Then all I can say is that, in that case, the made-up things seem a good deal more important than the real ones... We're just babies making up a game, if you're right. But four babies playing a game can make a play-world which licks your real world hollow. That's why I'm going to stand by the play-world. I'm on Aslan's side even if there isn't any Aslan to lead it. I'm going to live as like a Narnian as I can even if there isn't any Narnia... and that's a small loss if the world's as dull as you say." Lewis himself said of this passage:

I suppose your philosopher son... means the chapter in which Puddleglum puts out the fire with his foot. He must thank Anselm and Descartes for it, not me. I have simply put the 'Ontological Proof' in a form suitable for children. And even that is not so remarkable a feat as you might think. You can get into children's heads a good deal which is quite beyond the Bishop of Woolwich.

Lewis has, in sending the protagonists underground to a world which claims to be the only true one, also presented children with an inversion of Plato's allegory of the cave. Puddleglum, with Plato, recognizes the difference between the world of shadows, and the world with the sun.

== Portrayals ==
- In the 1990 television serial produced by the BBC, The Silver Chair, Puddleglum was portrayed by Tom Baker.
- The voice of Puddleglum was provided by Ron Moody on Focus on the Family Radio Theatre's dramatization of The Silver Chair and by Bernard Cribbins in the BBC Radio adaptation of the same story.

== Sources ==
- Lewis, C.S. (1953), The Silver Chair, London: Geoffrey Bles
- Sammons, Martha (1979), A Guide Through Narnia, Wheaton, Illinois: Harold Shaw, ISBN 0-87788-325-4
- Martindale, Wayne; Root, Jerry (1990), The Quotable Lewis, Tyndale House, ISBN 0-8423-5115-9
- Caughey, Shanna (2005), Revisiting Narnia: Fantasy, Myth and Religion in C. S. Lewis' Chronicles, Benbella Books, ISBN 1-932100-63-6
