= Jill Pole =

Fictional character in The Chronicles of Narnia

- Narnia character
- Jill Pole, as portrayed by Camilla Power in the 1990 BBC production of The Chronicles of Narnia
- First appearance: The Silver Chair (1953)
- Last appearance: The Last Battle (1956)
- Created by: C. S. Lewis

In-universe information
- Race: Human
- Nationality: English

Jill Pole is a major character from C. S. Lewis' Chronicles of Narnia series. She appears in The Silver Chair and The Last Battle.

== Appearances ==
=== The Silver Chair ===
Jill Pole first appears in The Silver Chair. She and Eustace attend the same school, and it is from the school grounds that they travel to Aslan's Country beyond the Sun, after being chased by bullies. She and Eustace are sent to Narnia by Aslan, to find the kidnapped Prince Rilian, son of Caspian X. They accomplish this with the assistance of the marshwiggle Puddleglum. Jill has to learn to face her claustrophobia and nyctophobia during her quest, and also is the one Aslan has tasked with remembering the four signs that will guide them on their quest. When she is distracted from doing this by temptation of good food and rest as part of the Lady of the Green Kirtle's trickery, the group lose their way and find themselves in serious danger from the man-eating giants of Harfang. Jill is also the first to discover the exit from the Underland that leads back to Narnia, and she saves her wonderful clothes from Narnia to wear at fancy dress balls once she is back in England.

=== The Last Battle ===
Jill and Eustace are called into Narnia to help King Tirian in his struggle against the false appearance of Aslan, and a Calormene invasion. They first free the king from where he is tied to a tree. Then the three of them steal away to a Narnian supply garrison where they put on Calormene disguises and return to Stable Hill. When they arrive, they free Jewel the Unicorn. Then Jill disobeys the king's orders by entering the Stable, but in doing so, she discovers Puzzle the Donkey, the fake Aslan. Jill becomes Puzzle's friend and saves him from execution by Tirian.

During the battle, Jill fights with her bow and arrow and kills several Calormene soldiers while weeping for the now-doomed Narnia (she had previously stated that she hoped Narnia would go on forever). She later goes through the stable door and comes into Aslan's Country along with the others and also becomes one of the Queens (alongside Polly and Lucy) along with Eustace who becomes a King like Digory, Peter, and Edmund.

== Portrayal ==
In the 1990 BBC production of The Chronicles of Narnia, Jill Pole was portrayed by Camilla Power.

In the 2010 film The Chronicles of Narnia: The Voyage of the Dawn Treader, Jill Pole is mentioned visiting Eustace at the end, although she is not shown.
