= Eustace Scrubb =

Fictional character in the Narnia universe

- Narnia character
- Will Poulter as Eustace in the 2010 film, The Chronicles of Narnia: The Voyage of the Dawn Treader
- First appearance: The Voyage of the Dawn Treader (1952)
- Last appearance: The Last Battle (1956)
- Created by: C. S. Lewis

In-universe information
- Race: Human
- Family: Harold Scrubb (father); Alberta Scrubb (mother)
- Relatives: Peter Pevensie (cousin); Susan Pevensie (cousin); Edmund Pevensie (cousin); Lucy Pevensie (cousin)
- Nationality: English

Eustace Clarence Scrubb is a fictional character in C. S. Lewis's Chronicles of Narnia. He appears in The Voyage of the Dawn Treader, The Silver Chair, and The Last Battle. In The Voyage of the Dawn Treader, he is accompanied by Edmund and Lucy Pevensie, his cousins. In The Silver Chair and The Last Battle, he is accompanied by Jill Pole, a classmate from his school.

== Personality ==
Eustace is portrayed at first as arrogant, whiny, and self-centred. It can be gathered from Eustace's behaviour, and the tone that Lewis used in describing his family and school, that Lewis thought such behaviour silly and disliked it a great deal. In fact, at the beginning of The Voyage of the Dawn Treader, Lucy and Edmund dislike visiting him and his parents, though that has mostly to do with Eustace's arrogant and unfriendly attitude, and he also calls his parents by their first names. However, the book deals with his rehabilitation (just as The Lion, the Witch and the Wardrobe dealt with Edmund's) and in the later books, he is an altogether better person, becoming a hero along with his friend Jill Pole, although he still sometimes tends to be a know-it-all. It is mentioned in the Silver Chair that Eustace is afraid of heights, causing him to overreact when Jill goes too close to the edge of a cliff. In trying to stop her, he falls. In other respects, Eustace displays great courage and a fair degree of discernment in facing the challenges that confront him in the Narnian world.

== Biography ==
=== Prior story ===
According to Lewis's Narnian timeline, Eustace was born in 1933 and is 9 years old when he appears in The Voyage of the Dawn Treader; and by the time of The Last Battle he is 16 years old.

=== The Voyage of the Dawn Treader ===
Eustace Scrubb, as portrayed by David Thwaites in the BBC production

Eustace is introduced at the beginning of The Voyage of the Dawn Treader with the opening line, "There was a boy called Eustace Clarence Scrubb, and he almost deserved it." He is the only child of what Lewis describes as "very up-to-date and advanced people", who send him to a progressive mixed school. Eustace calls his parents by their first names (Harold and Alberta); his parents are vegetarians, nonsmokers, teetotallers, pacifists, and wear an unspecified special kind of underclothes.

Much of the narrative of The Voyage of the Dawn Treader concerns the personal growth of Eustace, as he is drawn into Narnia and aboard the eponymous ship along with Edmund and Lucy, and into adventures that bring him to realise how self-centred his attitudes are. Part of the story is told with extracts from his diary, where we see how skewed his point of view is. He describes the ship sailing in perpetual storm (though the weather is fine), and portrays the others as foolishly denying the supposed rough seas and refusing to face the "truth" of the situation. He complains when Lucy is given Caspian's cabin, and comments to the crew that giving girls special treatment is actually "putting them down, and making them weaker". Moreover, he cannot accept that he is in the Narnian world: he imagines that he can "lodge a disposition" (or "bring an action") at a British consulate or a British court; and he is beaten by Reepicheep for treating the mouse as one might a circus animal.

Eustace wanders off by himself when the ship puts ashore on an unexplored island. He falls asleep on a dead dragon's hoard and finds himself transformed into a dragon by "greedy, dragonish thoughts" in his heart. He also finds himself in constant pain from Lord Octesian's arm bracelet, which he put on as a boy but is too small for a dragon's leg. Upon return to the Dawn Treader, he is nearly attacked by the crew until Lucy asks if he is Eustace, to which he vigorously nods his head. Being a dragon changes Eustace; instead of behaving like his usual sulky self, he helps the travellers find food, shelter, and a tree to serve as a new mainmast. The problem comes when it is time to leave the island, as the ship cannot hold or maintain a dragon. Reepicheep displays sympathy to Eustace's plight despite the boy's prior cruelty to the mouse and they eventually become friends.

Eventually, Eustace meets Aslan, who returns him to human form by peeling off his dragon skin and sending him into a refreshing bath. Edmund shares his own redemption story with Eustace, observing that "you were only an ass, but I was a traitor." Eustace improves after this, and becomes a valuable member of the expedition. When the ship is in danger of being sunk by a giant sea-serpent, Eustace attacks the monster, using only a sword. When Eustace returns home after his adventures, his mother thinks he has become tiresome and commonplace, blaming the change on the influence of "those Pevensie children" – though everyone else thinks that he has become a much better person.

=== The Silver Chair ===
Eustace returns to his progressive school where he is now labeled a misfit, due to the changes in him wrought during The Voyage of The Dawn Treader. Whereas previously he was a crony and tale-bearer to the gang of bullies who are given free rein at the school, he is now one of their targets, but has the courage to withstand them. He befriends fellow misfit Jill Pole, and their desire to leave the school draws them into Narnia. This unlikely friendship (given that Eustace had bullied Jill before his experience in Narnia) is strengthened throughout the story. Following the custom of their school, Eustace and Jill address each other by their surnames, "Scrubb" and "Pole".

The two journey to the far north of Narnia, and the world below it, to recover the lost heir to the throne and to thwart the plan of the Lady of the Green Kirtle to overthrow the kingdom. Though he still has faults, mainly stubbornness and rash decision-making, Eustace displays little of his former odiousness, and he and Jill begin to develop affection towards one another. He wholeheartedly rejects the insipid philosophy offered by the Lady in favour of the Narnian life that he has grown to love. He helps Prince Rilian to escape the underworld and return to Narnia, just in time to meet Rilian's aged father before the latter's death. Caspian was now an old man, as 50 years had passed since Eustace had first been in Narnia.

Eustace and Jill return to Aslan's Country, where Caspian is resurrected and restored to the youth and strength that Eustace remembers from his earlier visit to this world. At the end of the story, Caspian is briefly translated into Eustace's world, something that Caspian has wanted ever since he met Eustace's cousins 53 years earlier. Here he and Aslan help the two friends to scare off the school bullies and set in motion a chain of events that leads to the school's becoming a well-managed place of learning.

=== The Last Battle ===
Eustace and Jill are sent to Narnia shortly before its destruction to help young King Tirian rally supporters for one last battle to save Narnia. The friends show great courage and wisdom, but the Narnian forces ultimately go down to defeat.

Meanwhile, a railway accident in England has resulted in the death of Eustace and Jill, along with Lucy, Edmund, and Peter, as well as Polly and Digory. They find themselves in Aslan's country, dressed as royalty. They all look on as Aslan brings the world of Narnia to an end. Thereafter they encounter many of the characters they had known in the old world, as they climb "further up and further in" to live in eternal happiness in the Real Narnia.

== Themes ==
Writer Philip Hensher objected to the description of Eustace and his family, regarding it as evidence of supposed anti-intellectual and anti-progressive leanings. In Lewis' essay The Abolition of Man, he argues that modern education is producing "men without chests" – people whose lives are divided between the purely cerebral and the purely visceral, without any middle ground of sentiment or imagination – and Eustace (in his initial state) is clearly intended to be one of these. In the same essay, however, Lewis denies the suggestion that he is attacking intellect as such, and in his book on Miracles he even argues for the scholastic belief that the intellect is our participation in the supernatural world. Similarly, he was not against progress in the sense of objectively justifiable social improvement, but did oppose purely fashionable progressivism, and in particular what he called "chronological snobbery" – the view that the superiority of modern values can always be assumed automatically and without investigation.

== Portrayal ==
In the BBC production, Eustace was portrayed by David Thwaites. In the 2014 BBC audiobook dramatisations of the books, he is portrayed by Marco Williamson. Will Poulter plays Eustace in the Walden Media film adaptation, directed by Michael Apted. Among the alterations for the film is that when Eustace is turned into a dragon, he proves his true identity to Edmund by flying him to where he has used his fire breath to carve the sentence, "I am Eustace" on the ground. Once establishing his identity, the agonizingly undersized bracelet Eustace was wearing when he was transformed into a dragon is quickly removed with Lucy's help. (In the book, Lucy eased the pain with her cordial but the arm bracelet was not removed until Eustace resumed human form.) Afterward, and still in his dragon form, Eustace accompanies the Dawn Treader on its quest to the next islands, and earns the respect of the crew first by towing the ship when it is caught in magically imposed doldrums and later aiding the crew in battle against the sea serpent on the Dark Island, but gets injured. It is here that Aslan restores Eustace to normal, but only by scratching off the dragon's skin. Eustace's final redemption comes when he races to lay the seventh magic sword at Aslan's Table, unleashing the swords' power to defeat the evil of Dark Island and saving his friends.

The Oh Hellos, a folk rock band, wrote a song "The Lament of Eustace Scrubb" on their 2012 album Through the Deep, Dark Valley.
