= The Silver Chair =

1953 children's novel by C. S. Lewis

- First edition dust jacket
- Author: C. S. Lewis
- Illustrator: Pauline Baynes
- Cover artist: Pauline Baynes
- Language: English
- Series: The Chronicles of Narnia
- Release number: 4
- Genre: Children's fantasy novel, Christian literature
- Publisher: Geoffrey Bles
- Publication date: 7 September 1953
- Publication place: United Kingdom
- Media type: Print (hardcover)
- Pages: 217 (first edition); 51,022 words (US)
- ISBN: 978-0-00-671681-5 (Collins, 1998; full colour)
- OCLC: 1304139
- LC Class: PZ8.L48 Si
- Preceded by: The Voyage of the Dawn Treader
- Followed by: The Horse and His Boy
- Text: The Silver Chair online

The Silver Chair is a children's portal fantasy novel written by British author C. S. Lewis and published by Geoffrey Bles in 1953. It was the fourth of seven novels published in The Chronicles of Narnia (1950–1956), but became volume six in recent editions sequenced in chronological order to Narnian history. Macmillan US published a revised American edition within the calendar year. Like the others, it was illustrated by Pauline Baynes and her work has been retained in many later editions.

The novel is set primarily in the world of Narnia, decades after The Voyage of the Dawn Treader there but less than a year later in England. (Note: King Caspian X of Narnia is now an old man, but both stories occur in 1942. A manuscript by Lewis, the "Outline of Narnian History", dates major events in the Narnia world and simultaneous events in England. Since his death, it has been published in books about Narnia and it is generally considered valid.) King Caspian X is now an old man, but his son and only heir, Prince Rilian, is missing. Aslan the lion sends two children from England to Narnia on a mission to resolve the mystery: Eustace Scrubb, from The Voyage of the Dawn Treader, and his classmate, Jill Pole. In England, Eustace and Jill are students at a horrible boarding school, Experiment House.

The Silver Chair is dedicated to Nicholas Hardie, the son of Colin Hardie, a member of the Inklings with Lewis, and was adapted and filmed as a BBC television series of six episodes in 1990.

== Plot summary ==
Eustace Scrubb, now a reformed character following the events of The Voyage of the Dawn Treader, encounters his classmate and new friend Jill Pole at their school, Experiment House, where they are miserable. Jill has been tormented by bullies and is hiding from them. Eustace tells Jill about his Narnian adventures, and how his experiences there led to the changes in his behaviour – which Jill warns is likely to see him targeted by the bullies as well. Eustace suggests asking for Aslan's help, and as the bullies converge on them, the two blunder through a gate that leads them to Aslan's Country.

They encounter a cliff, where Jill shows off by approaching the edge, and Eustace, trying to pull her back, falls over the edge. Aslan appears and saves Eustace by blowing him on a magical wind stream to Narnia. He charges Jill with helping Eustace find King Caspian X's son, Prince Rilian of Narnia, who disappeared ten years earlier. He gives Jill four Signs to guide them on their quest and then blows Jill into Narnia, where Eustace is already waiting by a great castle. They watch as an elderly and frail man takes ship and sails from the harbour. To Eustace's dismay, they then learn that the elderly man is actually King Caspian; by failing to greet him, they have missed the first Sign. Seventy years have passed since Eustace was last in Narnia, even though less than a year has passed in his world. They also learn that Caspian has sailed off to visit again the lands they had sailed to when he and Eustace were young and many Narnians believe that he has set off to seek Aslan in order to ask who can be the next King of Narnia when he dies. Caspian is obviously deteriorating with old age, and his people fear that he will not live for much longer.

Caspian's Lord Regent Trumpkin the dwarf, now very elderly and mostly deaf, provides Jill and Eustace with rooms in Cair Paravel, but on the advice of Glimfeather the Talking Owl, they make no mention of their quest. Glimfeather summons them to a Parliament of his fellow talking owls (a double play on words as parliament can mean a political assembly and a flock of owls), who explain that Prince Rilian disappeared a decade earlier while searching for a large green serpent that had killed his mother.

Jill and Eustace are flown to the marshes on the northern edge of Narnia where they meet their guide, Puddleglum, a gloomy but stalwart Marsh-wiggle. They journey toward the giant-lands north of Narnia. Hungry and suffering from exposure, they meet the Lady of the Green Kirtle accompanied by a silent knight in black armour. She encourages them to proceed northward to Harfang, the castle of the "Gentle Giants", who she says would be glad to have them at their Autumn Feast. Jill and Eustace, overcome at the thought of comfort and warmth, are eager to go; only Puddleglum argues against the journey to Harfang. After a long journey in harsh weather, and braving a mysterious chasm in a driving snowstorm, they are welcomed at Harfang.

From the castle the three see that in the snowstorm they had blundered through the ruins of a giant city in the valley below, thereby missing Aslan's second Sign. They also see the words "Under Me" engraved on the cliff, which is the third Sign. Discovering from a cookbook in the kitchen that they are the main course for the Autumn Feast, they make a narrow escape from Harfang. Following the Sign, they take shelter in a cave under the ruined city, where they fall down a long dark slope into Underland.

They are found by an army of underground-dwelling earthmen, who take them aboard a boat across the subterranean Sunless Sea to the city ruled by the Lady of the Green Kirtle. She herself is away, but her protégé, a young man, greets the travellers pleasantly. He explains that he suffers nightly psychotic episodes, and during these episodes he must, by the Lady's orders, be bound to a silver chair; for if he is released, he will turn into a deadly green serpent and kill everyone in sight. The three travellers determine to witness the youth in his torment, as they sense it could be the key to their quest.

When the young man is tied to his chair, his "ravings" seem instead to indicate desperation to escape an enchanted captivity. After several threats, the youth finally begs the three to release him in the name of Aslan. Recognizing this as the fourth Sign, they hesitantly do so, believing that he could indeed be Prince Rilian. The young man immediately destroys the silver chair. Free from enchantment, he thanks them and declares that he is indeed the vanished Prince Rilian, kept underground by the Lady of the Green Kirtle as part of her plot to conquer Narnia by brainwashing and marrying him.

The Green Lady returns and tries to bewitch them all into forgetting who they are, but the barefoot Puddleglum stamps out the enchantress's magical fire and breaks her spell. The enraged Lady transforms herself into a green serpent, and Rilian kills her with the help of Eustace and Puddleglum, realizing that the Green Lady was herself the serpent who killed his mother. Rilian leads the travellers to escape from Underland. The gnomes, who had also been magically enslaved by the Lady, are now freed by her death and joyfully return to their home even deeper in the earth: a land called Bism. One of them shows Rilian's party a route to the surface, and Rilian returns to Cair Paravel as King Caspian is returning home. Caspian is reunited with his long-lost son but dies just after giving his blessing. Rilian is then declared King of Narnia amid the weeping crowd.

Aslan appears and congratulates Eustace and Jill on achieving their goal, then returns them to the stream in his country where Jill first met him. The body of King Caspian appears in the stream, and Aslan instructs Eustace to drive a thorn into the lion's paw. Eustace obeys, and Aslan's blood flows over the dead King, who is revived and returned to youth. Aslan promises Eustace and Jill that, while they have to return to their own world for a while, they will one day return to Aslan's Country to stay. He then allows Caspian to accompany Eustace and Jill back to their own world for a brief time, where they drive off the bullies before Caspian returns to Aslan's Country. Experiment House becomes a well-managed school, and Eustace and Jill remain good friends.

Back in Narnia, Rilian buries his father and mourns him. The kingdom goes on to have many happy years, but Puddleglum "often pointed out that bright mornings brought on wet afternoons and that you couldn't expect good times to last."

== Main characters ==
- Jill Pole – A pupil at Experiment House who is found by Eustace Scrubb, crying, after she is bullied by a gang of children.
- Eustace Scrubb – Appeared in The Voyage of the Dawn Treader and is a cousin of the four Pevensie siblings from the earlier stories. Became a much nicer person after his brief time as an enchanted dragon in the previous story.
- Puddleglum – A pessimistic Marsh-wiggle who helps Jill and Eustace on their quest. He guides them and keeps them on track. He represents common sense and the voice of reason.
- The Lady of the Green Kirtle – The ruler of Underland, who plans to conquer Narnia with its rightful heir under her spell at her side.
- Prince Rilian – Heir to the Narnian throne, who was captured by the Lady of the Green Kirtle and enslaved in her Underworld.
- Aslan – The Lion who created Narnia; the only character to appear in every book.
- King Caspian – Elderly King of Narnia who appeared in Prince Caspian as a boy and The Voyage of the Dawn Treader as a young man; in The Silver Chair he is sad because his only son was taken from him 10 years earlier just after the death of his wife from a serpent attack.
- Glimfeather – a large talking Owl who spots Eustace and Jill during their arrival from Aslan's eastern country; he helps them by bringing them to a Parliament of Owls, where the history of Rilian is explained, and then by helping to carry them to meet Puddleglum. His speech often rhymes with the onomatopoeic call of owls, "to-whoo!" ("There's something magic about you two. I saw you arrive: you flew.").

== Background ==
The Silver Chair was the fifth Narnia book to be written, even though it would be published as the fourth. Lewis wrote The Silver Chair during his Christmas vacation in 1950 and had completed it by early March of the following year. Before deciding on The Silver Chair for its title, he also considered The Wild Waste Lands, News under Narnia, Gnomes under Narnia, and Night under Narnia. Night under Narnia had been a suggestion from his friend and fellow children's author, Roger Lancelyn Green, who also left feedback on the draft manuscript.

== Film, television, or theatrical adaptations ==
The BBC produced a TV series, which aired in late 1990. It was the fourth and last of the Narnia books that the BBC adapted for television.

On 1 October 2013, The C.S. Lewis Company announced that it had entered into an agreement with The Mark Gordon Company to jointly develop and produce The Chronicles of Narnia: The Silver Chair, following the film series' mirroring of the novel's publication order (in contrast to Walden Media's initial pushing for The Magician's Nephew during planning for a fourth film). Mark Gordon and Douglas Gresham along with Vincent Sieber, the Los Angeles–based director of The C.S. Lewis Company, will serve as producers and work with The Mark Gordon Company on developing the script. On 5 December 2013, it was announced that David Magee would write the screenplay. In January 2016, Gordon said the film will serve as a 'reboot' of the film franchise. It was announced that Sony Pictures and Entertainment One will finance the fourth film with both Mark Gordon Company and C.S. Lewis Company. In April 2017, it was announced that Joe Johnston would be directing the fourth film.

== Legacy ==
The band Silverchair named themselves after the novel.

== Sources ==
- Downing, David C. (2005). Into the Wardrobe: C. S. Lewis and the Narnia Chronicles. San Francisco: Jossey-Bass. ISBN 978-0-7879-7890-7.
- Green, Roger Lancelyn; Hooper, Walter (1974). C. S. Lewis: A Biography. New York: Harcourt Brace Jovanovich. ISBN 0-15-123190-7.
- Sayer, George (1994). Jack: A life of C.S. Lewis. Wheaton, Illinois: Crossway Books. ISBN 0-89107-761-8.
