= Narnia =

Fantasy world by C. S. Lewis

- The Chronicles of Narnia location
- 1972 Map of Narnia by Pauline Baynes
- Created by: C. S. Lewis
- Genre: Children's fantasy

In-universe information
- Type: Fantasy world
- Ethnic groups: Narnians, Wild Westerners, Telmarines, Archenlanders, Calormenes, Ettinsmoorish, Northerners, Underlanders, Bismites, Merpeople, Galmanes, Terebinthians, Seven Islanders, Lone Islanders, Burnt Islanders (actual name unknown), Duffers, Sea People
- Races: Centaurs, Dragons, Dwarves, Dufflepuds, Earthmen, Ettins, Fauns, Hags, Giants, Humans, Marsh-wiggles, Minotaurs, Ogres, Nymphs, Sea Serpents, Talking Animals, Werewolves, etc.
- Locations: Narnia (country), Archenland, Calormen, Underland, Aslan's Country
- Characters: Aslan, White Witch, Mr. Tumnus

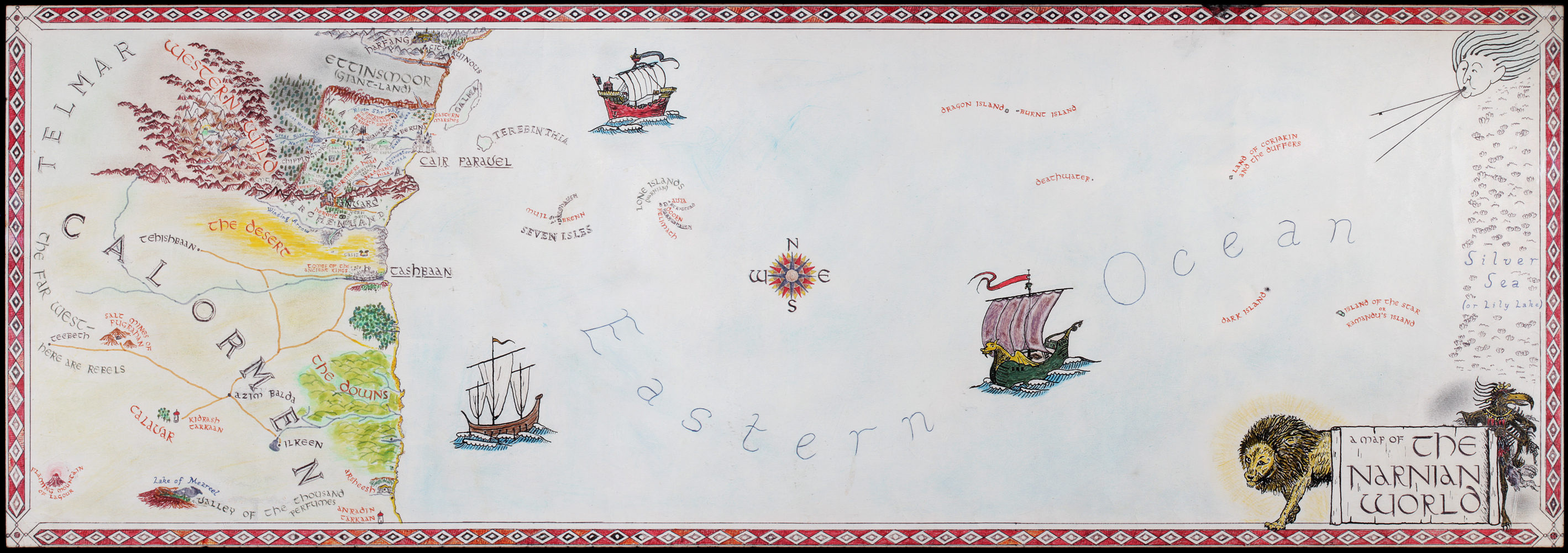
A 1976 map of the Narnian world

Narnia is a fantasy world created by author C. S. Lewis as the primary location for his series of seven fantasy novels for children, The Chronicles of Narnia. The name is derived from the land where much of the Chronicles takes place.

In Narnia, there exist talking animals, mythical beasts abound, and magic is common. The series tracks the story of Narnia when humans, usually children, enter the Narnian world from Earth in a typical portal fantasy. The entire Narnian timeline, from its creation to its end (c. 1–2555), ran parallel to 49 Earth-years (c. 1900–1949), thus on average a year on Earth meant 52.14 time dilation years in Narnia.

== Inspiration ==
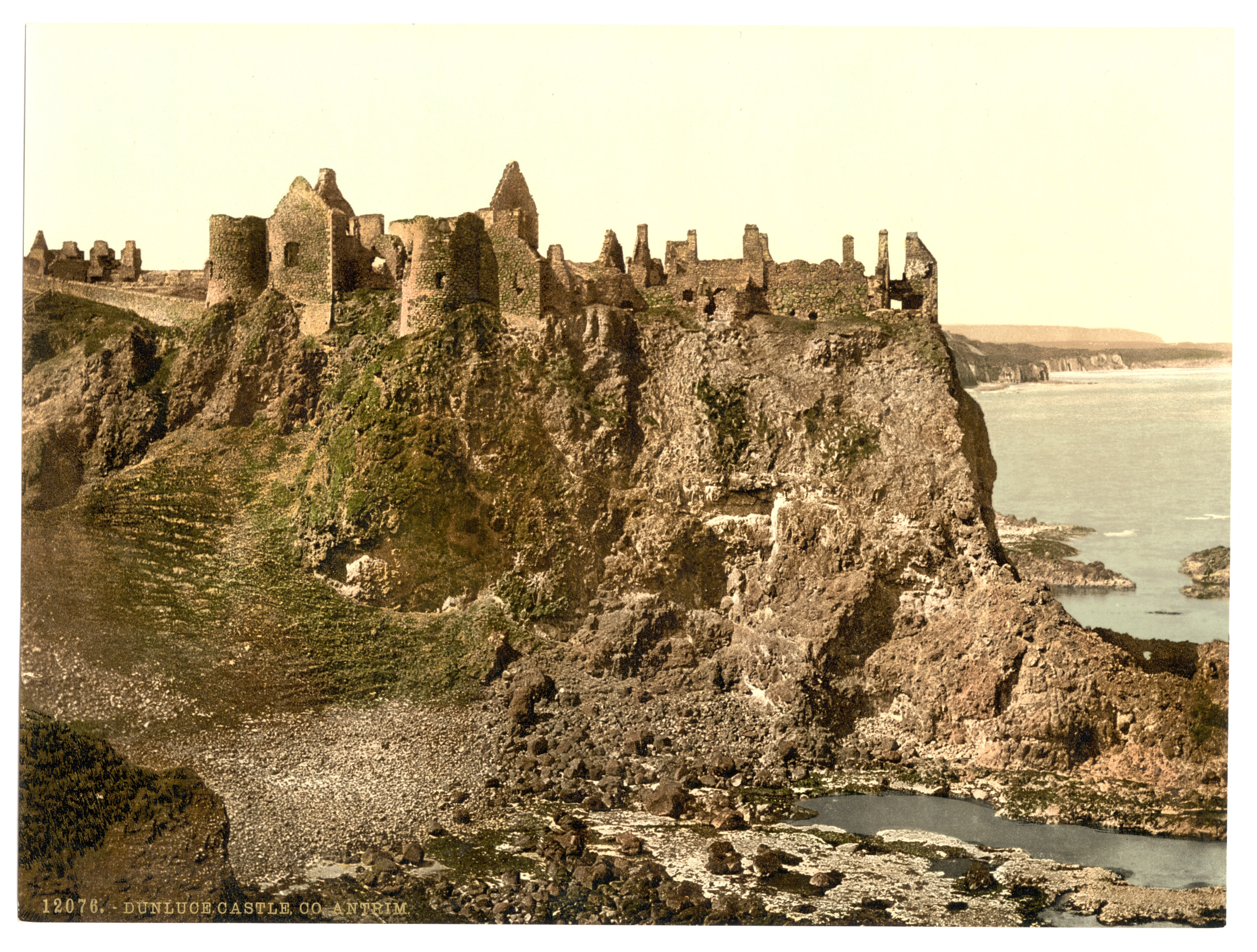
Dunluce Castle, the inspiration for Cair Paravel, as it appeared in the 1890s.

The landscape of Lewis' native Ireland, in particular his native Ulster, now modern-day Northern Ireland for most parts, played a large part in the creation of the Narnian landscape. In his essay On Stories, Lewis wrote "I have seen landscapes, notably in the Mourne Mountains and southwards which under a particular light made me feel that at any moment a giant might raise his head over the next ridge". In a letter to his brother, Lewis would later confide "that part of Rostrevor which overlooks Carlingford Lough is my idea of Narnia". Although in adult life Lewis lived in England, he returned to Ulster often and retained fond memories of the Irish scenery, saying "I yearn to see County Down in the snow; one almost expects to see a march of dwarfs dashing past. How I long to break into a world where such things were true."

Beginning in 1906, young C. S. Lewis (1898–1963) visited the northern Irish seaside near Portrush in the north of County Antrim many times. In later years, Lewis remembered the sounds of the sea, the cliffs rising above it, and the ruined medieval towers of Dunluce Castle which many authors have speculated may have inspired his creation of Cair Paravel.

=== Narnia and Narni, Italy ===
Concerning Narnia and Narni, Roger Lancelyn Green writes about C. S. Lewis and Walter Hooper:

When Walter Hooper asked [C. S. Lewis] where he found the word 'Narnia', Lewis showed him Murray's Small Classical Atlas, ed. G.B. Grundy (1904), which he acquired when he was reading the classics with Mr [William T. Kirkpatrick at Great Bookham [1914–1917]. On plate 8 of the Atlas is a map of ancient Italy. Lewis had underscored the name of a little town called Narnia, simply because he liked the sound of it. Narnia – or 'Narni' in Italian – is in Umbria, halfway between Rome and Assisi.

Narnia, a small medieval town, is situated at the top of an olive-covered hill. It was already ancient when the Romans defeated it in 299 BC. Its thirteenth-century fortress dominates a deep, narrow gorge of the Nera river which runs below. One of its most important archaeological features is a Romanesque cathedral, which contains the relics of a number of Umbrian saints.

== Fictional geography ==
=== Narnia ===
Kingdom of Narnia
- The Chronicles of Narnia location
- Flag of the Narnian Realm (Golden Age) Flag of the Narnian Realm (later years)
- Created by: C. S. Lewis
- Genre: Children's fantasy

In-universe information
- Other name: Narnia
- Type: Absolute monarchy
- Races: Telmarines (formerly Humans from Earth), Dwarfs, Giants, Fauns, Centaurs, Nymphs, Marsh-wiggles, Talking Animals, Humans, etc.
- Locations: Cair Paravel (capital), Lantern Waste, Beaversdam, Beruna
- Characters: Mr. Tumnus, White Witch, Caspian X, Trumpkin

The novels are set primarly in the fictional country of Narnia, officially known as the Kingdom of Narnia. Protected by Aslan, the Great Lion, the kingdom is inhabited by humans, talking animals, and mythical creatures. Its landscape consists largely of forests and rolling hills, with low mountains to the south and marshlands to the north. Narnia is bordered by the Eastern Ocean to ethe east, a mountain range to the west, the River Shribble to the north and Archenland to the south. Narnia was a land of rolling hills rising into low mountains to the south, and was predominantly forested, except for marshlands in the north. There are a few known entrances to Narnia, these entrances include the iconic wardrobe from The Lion, the Witch and the Wardrobe, the painting from The Voyage of the Dawn Treader, the door at Experiment House from The Silver Chair, and the cave mentioned at the end of Prince Caspian which allowed the Telmarines to enter Narnia's world (it is also believed that that cave was a permanent access point).

The economic heart of the country centres on the Great River of Narnia, which crosses the country from the northwest on an east-southeasterly course to the Eastern Ocean. The seat of government is the castle of Cair Paravel, originally on a peninsula, later an island, at the mouth of the Great River on the coast of the Great Eastern Ocean. Other communities along the river include (from east to west):

- Beruna: One of four named towns in the country of Narnia. Beruna grew as a strategic location because of the fords on the Great River of Narnia that were located there. When Narnia was conquered by the Telmarines, a town was built at the Fords of Beruna and a bridge over the river was constructed. In Prince Caspian, Susan Pevensie and Lucy Pevensie accompany Aslan to the bridge, and Bacchus destroys it at the request of the river-god ("Loose my chains").
- Beaversdam: A community named after the dam in the area built by Mr. and Mrs. Beaver, who met Peter, Susan, Edmund, and Lucy on their arrival in Narnia. The community still existed under the Telmarine rule and seemed to have hosted a majority of the population descended from the Telmarines. At the time when the usurper Miraz purged the aristocracy of anyone who might threaten his rule, two brothers who were the lords of Beaversdam were locked up as "madmen". (PC)
- Chippingford: One of four towns named in the country of Narnia. It is mentioned briefly at the start of The Last Battle when Shift the Ape sends Puzzle the donkey there to buy oranges and bananas. It is a British English name, made up as if derived from the Anglo-Saxon Cēapungford which means "market ford". (LB)

=== Archenland ===
Kingdom of Archenland
- The Chronicles of Narnia location
- Flag of Archenland

- Coat of arms of Archenland
- Created by: C. S. Lewis
- Genre: Children's fantasy

In-universe information
- Other name: Archenland
- Type: Absolute monarchy
- Locations: Anvard (capital), Mount Pire
- Characters: King Lune, Cor, Corin

Archenland is a mountainous country south of Narnia. It is bordered on the north by Narnia and on the south by the Winding Arrow River and further south is the Great Desert. The seat of government is at Anvard, in the heart of the country, a fortified area.

=== Calormen ===
Calormen is a semi-arid empire in the south of the world of Narnia. The capital of Calormen is Tashbaan, located on an island near the mouth of the River of Calormen, which flows from west to east in the north of Calormen, just south of the Great Desert. The city of Azim Balda, to the south of Tashbaan, is a hub where many roads meet; it hosts the government's postal system. Prince Caspian describes slave trade between Calormen and Telmar from areas far south of Calormen.

=== Northern Countries ===
North of Narnia lies Ettinsmoor, a cold barren plain home to the once civilized, now anarchistic giants. North of Ettinsmoor is a deep gorge crossed by an ancient bridge known simply as the "Giant Bridge", part of a long-abandoned road. This leads to the Wild Lands of the North, home of the Ruined City of the Giants and the castle Harfang, which is still inhabited by giants.

=== Eastern Ocean ===
East of Narnia is the Great Eastern Ocean, where the Bight of Calormen is home to the Merpeople and the islands of Galma, Terebinthia, Seven Isles, and the Lone Islands. Beyond the Bight of Calormen is more ocean, including the islands of Dragon Island, Burnt Island, Death Water Island, Island of the Duffers, Dark Island, and the Island of the Star. Beyond the Island of the Star, is another undersea country called the Eastern Last Sea, the water of white lilies known as the Silver Sea, and the Utter East, which is a small plain, bordering a perpetual wave and the high mountains of Aslan's Country.

=== Western Lands ===
To Narnia's west is the landlocked Western Wild, south of this country and also west of Calormen is the Far West region, and somewhere beyond this is Telmar, and eventually on the other side of the unnamed continent is the Western Sea. The Western Sea is an uncharted territory of the Narnian world, but some claim that on its islands are "strange and unearthly creatures".

=== Underground ===
Below Narnia's surface is a dark sunless country named Underland. Deeper than that, at the world's base, is the fiery nation of Bism, home to the Gnomes and Salamanders.

=== Aslan's Country ===
Aslan's Country is the home of Aslan, the Great Lion. It is described as a series of mountains, tens of thousands of feet high, but without snow or ice. Instead, Aslan's Country has a clear blue sky, lush green grass, colourful birds, and beautiful trees. There are entrances to Aslan's Country from all worlds, including Narnia and Earth. It is located beyond Narnia's rising sun at the eastern edge of the world, and indeed rings around the whole Narnian world.

== Fictional cosmology ==
In the domed sky are the sun and moon, which rise from the Utter East and set in the Utter West. The Last Sea in the east is bright with a "drinkable light". There are stars and planets in the sky but in the Narnian world they are people who move accordingly, and some live on the surface.

The flat world of Narnia is connected to Earth and many other worlds through a nexus called the Wood between the Worlds. Travel is possible through a pool each for every world. The Wood is so named by Polly Plummer, who is transported there when Digory Kirke's Uncle Andrew tricks her into picking up a magic yellow ring. It has a slothful influence on those travelling it, which is explained by C. S. Lewis as the Wood being a place where nothing ever happens, unlike the different worlds that it connects. For the child protagonists, this experience is pleasant and relaxing. However, it affects the White Witch Jadis negatively: she shrieks in despair that the wood is "killing" her, and she is sickly and pale. It could be described as a nexus of sorts, existing outside the other worlds and not being a world on its own. The wood derives its name from The Wood Beyond the World, a fantasy novel by William Morris, an author who Lewis greatly admired. However, the location's function stems from another Morris novel, The Well at the World's End. Some scholars have suggested Dante's Divine Comedy or Algernon Blackwood's "The Education of Uncle Paul", both of which Lewis was known to have enjoyed, as possible secondary influences.

== Fictional timeline ==
Lewis provided a timeline of events related to The Chronicles of Narnia, in emulation of The Tale of the Years chronology in J. R. R. Tolkien's The Lord of the Rings. He gave an "Outline of Narnian History" in manuscript form to Walter Hooper, who included it in his essay Past Watchful Dragons: The Fairy Tales of C. S. Lewis. The novels never explicitly mention the year or years in which events take place, so the timeline is the only source for this information. Kathryn Lindskoog, along with other Lewis scholars, has challenged the authenticity of some posthumous works attributed to Lewis and edited by Hooper, but the validity of the outline in particular has not been questioned. The outline is accepted by Lewis experts and has been included in works by Paul Ford, Martha Sammons and others.

=== Consistency with other works ===
Several people have pointed out more or less significant areas where Lewis's Outline is not consistent with the text of the Chronicles. For example, the outline dates Queen Swanwhite c. 1502, though according to The Last Battle she ruled Narnia before Jadis returned (meaning that her reign must have ended before 898).

Paul Ford, author of Companion to Narnia, points out that the text of The Lion, the Witch and the Wardrobe states that Edmund and Lucy are one year apart in age; the years given in the timeline for their births, 1930 and 1932 respectively, which unless Edmund was born towards the end of 1930, and Lucy was born early in 1932, would put the age gap at two years. Devin Brown, author of Inside Narnia: A Guide to Exploring The Lion, the Witch, and the Wardrobe, uses the timeline as a way to reconcile some of the statements concerning the timing of Aslan's appearances in Narnia with other characters' recollections of those appearances.

== See also ==
- Outline of Narnia
- Magical creatures in The Chronicles of Narnia
- Pauline Baynes, original illustrator for the Narnia books and maps; she also illustrated some of J. R. R. Tolkien's books, and drew two poster maps of Middle-earth (but not the ones published in the books).
- The Chronicles of Narnia (film series)—for details on the films
- Discworld
- Land of Oz
- Middle-earth
- Neverland
- Red Moon and Black Mountain
- Wonderland
