= Carny =

American slang term for carnival employee

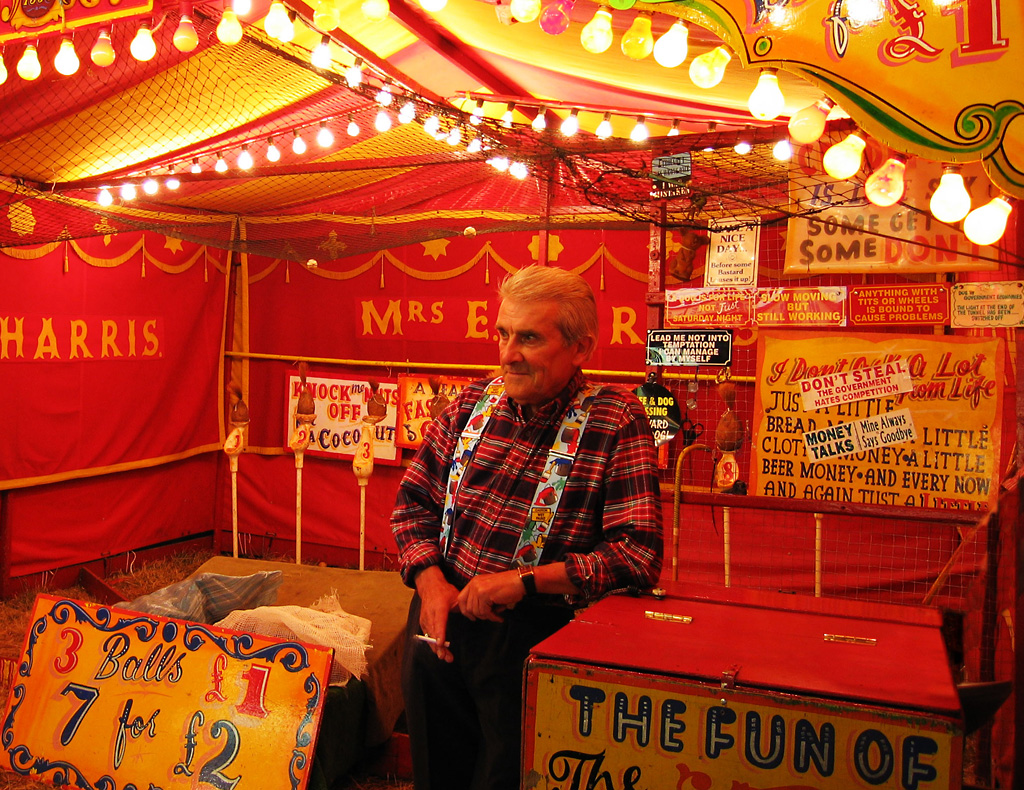
A carny ("jointee") and his coconut shy in 2005

A carny, also spelled carnie, is North American informal slang for a traveling carnival employee, and the language they use, particularly when the employee operates a game ("joint"), food stand ("grab", "popper", or "floss wagon"), or ride ("ride jock") at a carnival. The term "showie" is used synonymously in Australia, while "showman" is used in the United Kingdom.

== Etymology ==
Carny is thought to have become popularized around 1931 in North America, when it was first colloquially used to describe one who works at a carnival. The word carnival, originally meaning a "time of merrymaking before Lent" and referring to a time denoted by lawlessness (often ritualised under a lord of misrule figure and intended to show the consequences of social chaos), came into use around 1549.

== Carny language ==
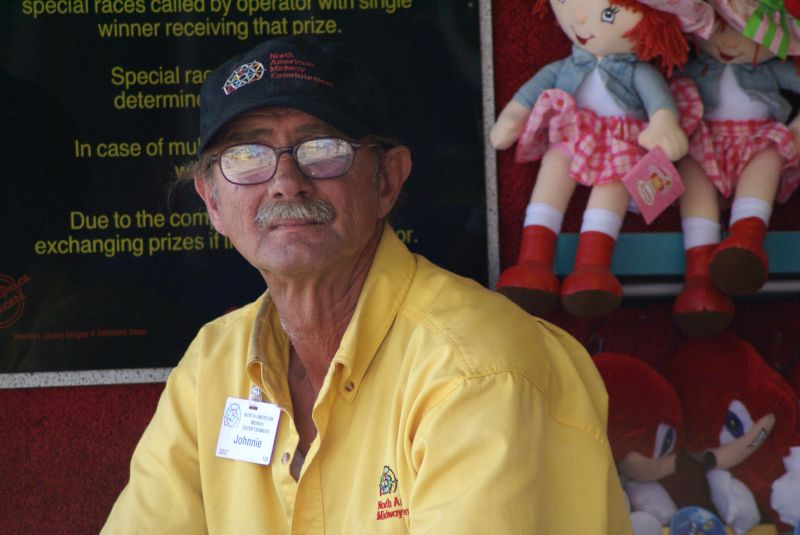
Johnnie, a carny at the 2007 Indiana State Fair.

The carny vocabulary is traditionally part of carnival cant, a secret language. It is an ever-changing form of communication, in large part designed to be impossible to understand by an outsider. As words are assimilated into the culture at large, they lose their function and are replaced by more obscure or insular terms. Most carnies no longer use cant, but some owners/operators and "old-timers" ("half yarders") still use some of the classic terms.

In addition to carny jargon, some carnival workers used a special infix ("earz" or "eez" or "iz") to render regular language unintelligible to outsiders. This style eventually migrated into wrestling, hip hop, and other parts of modern culture.

The British form of fairground cant is called "Rocker".

== Usage in popular culture ==
Film

- Freaks is a 1932 thriller which centers around the lives of carnival workers and features several real-life carnival performers in the cast.
- Nightmare Alley is a 1947 movie starring Tyrone Power and directed by Edmund Goulding, adapted from the novel of the same name by William Lindsay Gresham, which chronicles the rise and fall of a carny con man. The novel was adapted to film again in 2021, starring Bradley Cooper and directed by Guillermo del Toro.
- Torture Garden is a 1967 British horror film starring Burgess Meredith as a carny later revealed to be The Devil.
- Carny is a 1980 movie directed by Robert Kaylor. Jodie Foster plays a teenage waitress who joins a traveling carnival.
- In Two Moon Junction, Richard Tyson plays a carny who falls in love with a rich, southern socialite (Sherilyn Fenn).
- Girl on the Bridge is a film directed by Patrice Leconte, starring Daniel Auteuil and Vanessa Paradis. The story centers around a knife thrower who recruits a young woman on the brink of death to become the target girl in his carnival act.
- Carnies is a 2007 horror film directed by Brian Corder and starring Chris Staviski. In the film, a killer plagues a carnival sideshow in 1936.
- In Ghost Rider, Nicolas Cage stars as Johnny Blaze, who is referred to as a carny in the film.
- In the 2013 comedy We're the Millers, Mark L. Young portrays a carny named Scotty P, who works a "Monkey Maze" attraction at the local fair but doesn't know the meaning of the word. When asked whether he is a carny, he responds "I drive a motorcycle."
- In Elvis, Colonel Tom Parker speaks in Ciazarn to carnival workers.
- The plot of The Bob's Burgers Movie revolves around the murder of a carny named Cotton Candy Dan. The Belcher children visit the carny section of town while investigating the murder.

Television

- The Simpsons episode "Bart Carny", written by John Swartzwelder, guest stars Jim Varney as a carny named Cooder. In the episode, Bart and Homer Simpson are forced to work as carnies after Bart destroys Hitler's car while attending a traveling carnival. Carny jargon is used throughout the episode.
- The HBO series Carnivàle centers around a traveling carnival in the American Southwest during the Great Depression.
- Two season five episodes of The Blacklist written by Jon Bokenkamp and John Eisendrath display the series protagonist Raymond "Red" Reddington's knowledge of the carny language. In "Smokey Putnam", Reddington understands two carnies speaking to each other, and in "Abraham Stern" he speaks carny to an associate.
- Patrick Jane, the title character of the CBS crime drama The Mentalist, was raised as a carny.
- The fourth season of Heroes features several characters that live and work in a traveling carnival.
- In The Fairly OddParents episode "The Grass is Greener", protagonist Timmy Turner feels unwanted at home and decides to run away and join a carnival. He runs afoul of a group of professional carnies after using magic to outperform them.

Music

- The Joni Mitchell song "That Song About the Midway" tells a story about the singer falling in love with a carny and following his sideshow from town to town.
- Carney is a 1972 album by Leon Russell.
- "Rusholme Ruffians" is a song by The Smiths released on their album Meat Is Murder. The lyrics recount a schoolgirl's infatuation with a greasy-haired "speedway operator" working at a fair.
- "The Carny" is a song by Nick Cave and the Bad Seeds, appearing on their album Your Funeral... My Trial. The lyrics concern a carnival worker who vanishes.
- Carney is the title of the first album by Cross Canadian Ragweed. The lyrics of the title song "Carney Man" depict a man who aspires to become a carney.
- Carny was the original name of Austin, Texas psychedelic blues band The Cocky Bitches. The band was formed in 2005 by Paul Leary, guitarist of Butthole Surfers, and also features drummer Sam McCandless and singer-songwriter Formica Iglesia as frontwoman.
- Carny by John Zorn is a 22 page piece for piano solo.

Literature

- Nightmare Alley by William Lindsay Gresham chronicles the rise and fall of a carny con man. The novel was adapted into the films Nightmare Alley (1947) and Nightmare Alley (2021).
- Much of the fiction of pulp writer Fredric Brown features carnies and touches on carnival life, in particular the Ed and Am Hunter mysteries, beginning with The Fabulous Clipjoint in 1947.
- Theodore Sturgeon's novel The Dreaming Jewels follows eight-year-old Horty Bluett, who flees home with a group of traveling carnies to escape an abusive father. Sturgeon himself worked as a carny for a time.
- In Robert A. Heinlein's Stranger in a Strange Land, the protagonist Michael spends some time living with carnies.
- In Michael Kurland's The Unicorn Girl, some of the main characters are from a carnival travelling between the stars in an alternate universe. Sylvia, one of the travelers, uses carny cant when she and one of the Earthling protagonists visit a carnival on 20th-century Earth.
- Barry Longyear's Circus World books Circus World, City of Baraboo and Elephant Song are set on a planet populated by the descendants of a crashed space-going circus. Their society preserved and evolved elements of carny culture, including performance as a means of barter.
- The comic book series Karney, written by Bryan Johnson and illustrated by Walt Flanagan, follows the exploits of a murderous band of carnies who travel from town to town slaughtering the residents with the intention of turning them into barbecue meat.
- Joyland by Stephen King is set in a 1970s American amusement park and makes reference to carnies.

Theater

- Liliom is a 1909 play by Ferenc Molnár about a tough, cocky carousel barker who is given a chance to escape Purgatory.
- Carousel by Rodgers and Hammerstein is a musical based on Liliom.

Other

- Many carny words are still used in professional wrestling. Pro wrestling originated in the carnivals of the 19th and early 20th century, where wrestlers who wanted to make their bouts more entertaining, and avoid regular injury, would "stage" their fights. Carny language was used to disguise the staged nature of the bouts, with all involved "keeping kayfabe" to protect the secret.
  - In 2008, WWE introduced the wrestler KiZarny, portrayed by Nick Cvjetkovich, who was depicted as a carnival sideshow performer and spoke using a modified form of English inspired by carny speech. KiZarny wrestled for Smackdown from January to March 2009.
- Carnival Games (known in Europe as Carnival: Funfair Games) is a video game made for the Nintendo Wii and Nintendo DS featuring a carny who helps to present and explain gameplay.
- Radio host and comedian Ron Bennington grew up in a family of carnies, and worked as a carnival worker in his youth. He stated to his co-host, "All the world is just carnies and rubes."

== See also ==
- Romani people
- Mardi Gras
- Showman
