= Shadowlands (play) =

1989 play by William Nicholson

- Original language: English
- Written by: William Nicholson
- Characters: C. S. Lewis; Joy Davidman; Warren Lewis; Professor Christopher Riley; Douglas
- Subject: Biographical
- Genre: Drama
- Setting: Oxford, 1950s

Premiere
- Date: 1989
- Place: Theatre Royal, Plymouth

Shadowlands is a play by William Nicholson adapted from his 1985 television film of the same name, directed by Norman Stone and produced by David M. Thompson for BBC Wales. It debuted at the Theatre Royal in Plymouth on 5 October 1989 before premiering at the Queen's Theatre in London on 23 October 1989. The play is about the relationship between Oxford don and author C. S. Lewis and the American writer Joy Gresham.

== Synopsis ==
The story follows Lewis as he meets an American fan, Joy Gresham, whom he befriends and eventually marries. The story also focuses on his relationship with his brother, Warren Lewis and deals with his personal struggle: Lewis preaches that one should endure suffering with patience, but finds that the simple answers he had preached no longer apply when Joy becomes afflicted with cancer and eventually dies.

== Cast and characters ==
Character	Plymouth	West End	Broadway	West End Revival	Chichester	West End
Character	1989		1990	2007	2019	2026
C. S. Lewis	Nigel Hawthorne	Nigel Hawthorne	Nigel Hawthorne	Charles Dance	Hugh Bonneville	Hugh Bonneville
Joy Davidman	Jane Lapotaire	Jane Lapotaire	Jane Alexander	Janie Dee	Liz White	Maggie Siff
Warren Lewis	Geoffrey Toone	Geoffrey Toone	Michael Allinson	Richard Durden	Andrew Havill	Jeff Rawle

== Production history ==
The play opened at the Theatre Royal in Plymouth on 5 October 1989 before transferring to the Queen's Theatre in London on 23 October 1989, running until 8 September 1990. The stage version gave Joy Davidman only one son instead of two. The production was directed by Elijah Moshinsky and starred Nigel Hawthorne as Lewis with Jane Lapotaire as Joy. It won Best Play in the Evening Standard Awards for 1990. Lapotaire was nominated for the Laurence Olivier Award for Best Actress for her stage performance.

Hawthorne successfully took the role of Lewis to Broadway, playing at the Brooks Atkinson Theatre from November 1990 to April 1991 and again directed by Moshinsky. It was nominated for the Tony Award for Best Play. Hawthorne co-starred in New York, with Michael Allinson as Warren Lewis and Jane Alexander as Joy, who was now given her maiden name of Joy Davidman. Hawthorne won a 1991 Tony award for Best Actor, while Nicholson picked up a nomination for Best Play.

The first major revival of the play, starring Charles Dance as Lewis and Janie Dee as Joy, premiered at Cambridge Arts Theatre on 5 September 2007 before touring the UK. The production, directed by Michael Barker-Carven, transferred to the Wyndham's Theatre on 3 October 2007 for an eleven-week season before transferring to the Novello Theatre where it ran from 21 December 2007 to 23 February 2008.

A new production of Shadowlands at Chichester Festival Theatre opened on 26 April 2019. The production, which was directed by Rachel Kavanaugh, starred Hugh Bonneville as Lewis, Liz White as Joy Gresham and Andrew Havill as Warren Lewis.

The Chichester Festival production transferred to the Aldwych Theatre in London in February 2026, with Hugh Bonneville reprising his role as Lewis, and Maggie Siff taking the role of Joy Davidman.

== Quotes ==
Joy in the stage version:

"See yourself in the mirror, you're separate from yourself. See the world in the mirror, you're separate from the world. I don't want that separation anymore."

== Awards and nominations ==
=== Original West End production ===
Year	Award	Category	Nominee	Result
1990	Laurence Olivier Awards	Best Actress	Jane Lapotaire	Nominated

=== Original Broadway production ===
Year	Award	Category	Nominee	Result
1991	Tony Award	Best Play		Nominated
1991	Tony Award	Best Actor in a Play	Nigel Hawthorne	Won

== See also ==
- A Grief Observed — Lewis's own chronicle of his reactions following Joy Gresham's death
- Shadowlands — Lewis's biography by Brian Sibley
- Shadowlands: The True Story of C. S. Lewis and Joy Davidman by Brian Sibley, Hodder & Stoughton (new edition 2005) ISBN 978-0-340-90865-5
- Lenten Lands: My Childhood with Joy Davidman and C. S. Lewis by Douglas Gresham, Macmillan (USA 1988) ISBN 0-02-545570-2.
- Shadowlands by William Nicholson Study Guide by Randal L. Kottwitz @ Hastings Community Theatre
