= Joy Davidman =

American poet (1915–1960)

- Born: Helen Joy Davidman; 18 April 1915; New York City, U.S.
- Died: 13 July 1960 (aged 45); Oxford, England
- Occupations: Poet, author
- Known for: Smoke on the Mountain: An Interpretation of the Ten Commandments; life with CS Lewis
- Spouses: William Lindsay Gresham (m. 1942; div. 1954); C. S. Lewis (m. 1956)
- Children: 2, David and Douglas Gresham

Helen Joy Davidman (18 April 1915 – 13 July 1960) was an American poet and writer. Often referred to as a child prodigy, she earned a master's degree from Columbia University in English literature at age twenty, in 1935. For her book of poems, Letter to a Comrade, she won both the Yale Series of Younger Poets Competition in 1938 and the Russell Loines Award for Poetry in 1939. She was the author of several books, including two novels.

While an atheist and after becoming a member of the American Communist Party, she met and married her first husband and father of her two sons, William Lindsay Gresham, in 1942. After a troubled marriage, and following her conversion to Christianity, they divorced and she left America to travel to England with her sons.

Davidman published her best-known work in 1954, Smoke on the Mountain: An Interpretation of the Ten Commandments, with a preface by C. S. Lewis. C. S. Lewis influenced Davidman's work and conversion, and he became her second husband after her permanent relocation to England in 1956. Davidman died of malignant metastatic carcinoma involving the bones in 1960.

The relationship that developed between Davidman and Lewis has been featured in a BBC television film, a stage play, and a 1993 cinema film named Shadowlands. C. S. Lewis published the pseudoautobiographical memoir A Grief Observed under a pseudonym in 1961, drawing from notebooks he kept after Davidman's death; the memoir revealed his immense grief, and a period of questioning God.

== Early life ==
Helen Joy Davidman was born on 18 April 1915 into a secular middle-class Jewish family in New York City of Polish-Jewish and Russian-Jewish descent. Her parents, Joseph Davidman and Jeanette Spivack (married 1909), arrived in America in the late 19th century. Davidman grew up in the Bronx with her younger brother, Howard, and with both parents employed, even during the Great Depression. She was provided with a good education, piano lessons and family vacation trips. Davidman wrote in 1951: "I was a well-brought-up, right-thinking child of materialism... I was an atheist and the daughter of an atheist".

Davidman was a child prodigy who scored above 150 on IQ testing, and who possessed exceptional critical, analytical and musical skills. She read H. G. Wells's The Outline of History at the age of eight, and was able to play a score of Chopin on the piano after having read it only once. At an early age, she read George MacDonald's children's books, as well as his adult fantasy book, Phantastes. She wrote about the influence of these stories: "They developed in me a lifelong taste for fantasy, which led me years later to C. S. Lewis, who in turn led me to religion." A sickly child who had suffered from a crooked spine, scarlet fever and anemia throughout her school years, she attended classes with much older classmates. Davidman later referred to herself at this time as being "bookish, over-precocious and arrogant".

After finishing high school at Evander Childs High School at fourteen years old, she read books at home until she entered Hunter College in the Bronx at the age of fifteen, earning a BA degree at nineteen. In 1935, she received a master's degree in English literature from Columbia University in three semesters, while also teaching at Roosevelt High School, in Roosevelt, New York. In 1936, after several of Davidman's poems were published in Poetry, editor Harriet Monroe asked her to work for the magazine as reader and editor. Davidman resigned her teaching position to work full-time in writing and editing.

During the Great Depression, several incidents are said to have caused Davidman to question the fairness of capitalism and the American economic system. She joined the American Communist Party in 1938.

For her collection of poems, Letter to a Comrade, she won the Yale Series of Younger Poets Competition in 1938. She was chosen by Stephen Vincent Benét, who commended Davidman for her "varied command of forms and a bold power." In 1939, she won the Russell Loines Award for Poetry for this same book of poems. Although much of her work during this period reflected her politics as a member of the American Communist Party, this volume of poetry was much more than implied by the title, and contained forty-five poems written in traditional and free verse that were related to serious topics of the time such as the Spanish Civil War, the inequalities of class structure and male-female relationship issues. Davidman's style in these revealed the influence of Walt Whitman's Leaves of Grass.

She was employed by Metro-Goldwyn-Mayer in 1939 for a six-month stay in Hollywood writing movie scripts. She wrote at least four, but they were not used and she returned to New York City to work for The New Masses, where she wrote a controversial movie column, reviewing Hollywood movies in a manner described as "merciless in her criticisms." Her acclaimed first novel, Anya was published in 1940. Between 1941 and 1943, she was employed as a book reviewer and poetry editor for The New Masses with publications in many of the issues.

== Life with William Lindsay Gresham ==
She married her first husband, author William Lindsay Gresham, on 24 August 1942 after becoming acquainted with him through their mutual interest in communism. They had two sons, David Lindsay Gresham (born 27 March 1944) and Douglas Howard Gresham (born 10 November 1945). Bill Gresham had become disillusioned with the Communist Party while volunteering in Spain during the Spanish Civil War to fight fascism and influenced Davidman to leave the party after the birth of their sons. During the marriage, Gresham wrote his most famous work Nightmare Alley in 1946, while Davidman did freelance work and cared for the house and children.

The marriage was marked by difficulties that included financial problems, as well as her husband's alcoholism and infidelities. Gresham sometimes had drunken outbursts, once smashing his guitar on a chair. Davidman wrote that her husband had telephoned her one day in spring 1946 telling her that he was having a nervous breakdown and did not know when he would return home. Afterwards, she suffered from a defeated emotional state. She had an experience that she described as: "for the first time my pride was forced to admit that I was not, after all, 'the master of my fate'... All my defenses – all the walls of arrogance and cocksureness and self-love behind which I had hid from God – went down momentarily – and God came in." When Gresham did return home, the couple began to look to religion for answers. Davidman at first studied Judaism, but decided to study all religions and concluded that "the Redeemer who had made himself known, whose personality I would have recognized among ten thousand—He was Jesus." Through their religious studies, the couple, in particular, began to read and be influenced by the books of C. S. Lewis.

When Gresham received a large sum for the movie rights to Nightmare Alley, the family moved to an old mansion with acreage in the New York countryside, where Davidman began to write her second novel, Weeping Bay and Gresham also started his second novel, Limbo Tower. In 1948, they became members of the Pleasant Plains Presbyterian Church. Gresham had at first similar Christian convictions as Joy, but soon rejected them; he continued to have extramarital affairs and developed an interest in tarot cards and the I Ching. Both experimented with L. Ron Hubbard's theories of Dianetics and "audited" each other and friends. The couple became estranged, even though they continued to live together. After an introduction by a fellow American writer, Chad Walsh, Davidman began a correspondence with C. S. Lewis in 1950.

== Life with C. S. Lewis ==
Davidman first met Lewis in August 1952 when she made a trip to the United Kingdom. She planned to finish her book on the Ten Commandments, which showed influences of Lewis's style of apologetics. After several lunch meetings and walks accompanying Lewis and Davidman, Lewis's brother, Warren Lewis, wrote in his diary that "a rapid friendship" had developed between his younger brother and Davidman, whom he described as "a Christian convert of Jewish race, medium height, good figure, horn rimmed specs, quite extraordinarily uninhibited." She spent Christmas and a fortnight at The Kilns with the brothers. Though Davidman was deeply in love with Lewis, there was no reciprocation on his side.

She returned home in January 1953, having received a letter from Gresham that he and her cousin were having an affair and he wanted a divorce. Her cousin Renée Rodriguez had moved into the Gresham home and was keeping house for the family while she was away. Davidman intended to try to save the marriage, but she agreed to a divorce after a violent encounter with Gresham, who had resumed drinking. He married Rodriguez when the divorce became final in August 1954.

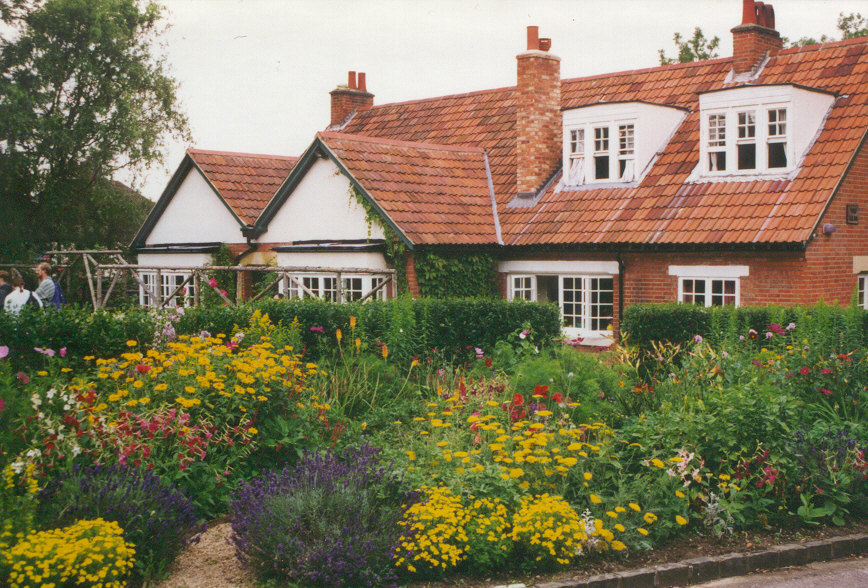
The Kilns, the Lewis home in Oxford

Confessing to be a "complete Anglomaniac", Davidman returned to England with her sons in November 1953. Cynthia Haven speculates that the activities of HUAC might have been a factor in her decision to emigrate and not return, given her political affiliations in the past. Davidman found a flat in London and enrolled David and Douglas at Dane Court Preparatory School, but she soon ran into financial difficulties when Gresham stopped sending money for support. Lewis paid the school fees and found Davidman and her sons a house in Oxford close to The Kilns. Lewis originally regarded her only as an agreeable intellectual companion and personal friend. Warren Lewis wrote: "For Jack (C. S. Lewis) the attraction was at first undoubtedly intellectual. Joy was the only woman whom he had met... who had a brain which matched his own in suppleness, in width of interest, and in analytical grasp, and above all in humour and a sense of fun."

She was my daughter and my mother, my pupil and my teacher, my subject and my sovereign; and always, holding all these in solution, my trusty comrade, friend, shipmate, fellow-soldier. My mistress; but at the same time all that any man friend (and I have good ones) has ever been to me. Perhaps more. – C. S. Lewis

Lewis began to ask for Davidman's opinion and criticism when he was writing and she served as the inspiration for Orual, the central character in Till We Have Faces (1956). Other works that she influenced or helped with include Reflections on the Psalms (1958) and The Four Loves (1960). Davidman's book Smoke on the Mountain: An Interpretation of the Ten Commandments was published in 1955 in England with a preface by C. S. Lewis. It sold 3,000 copies, double that of US sales.

In 1956, Davidman's visitor's visa was not renewed by the Home Office, requiring that she and her sons return to America. Lewis agreed to enter into a civil marriage contract with her so that she could continue to live in the UK, telling a friend that "the marriage was a pure matter of friendship and expediency". The civil marriage took place at the register office, 42 St Giles', Oxford, on 23 April 1956.

The couple continued to live separately after the civil marriage. In October 1956, Davidman was walking across her kitchen when she tripped over the telephone wire and fell to the floor, thereby breaking her left upper leg. At the Churchill Hospital, Oxford, she was diagnosed with incurable cancer, with bone metastases from breast carcinoma. It was at this time that Lewis recognised that he had fallen in love with her, realising how despondent he would feel to lose her. He wrote to a friend: "new beauty and new tragedy have entered my life. You would be surprised (or perhaps you would not?) to know how much of a strange sort of happiness and even gaiety there is between us." Davidman underwent several operations and radiation treatment for the cancer. In March 1957, Warren Lewis wrote in his diary: "One of the most painful days of my life. Sentence of death has been passed on Joy, and the end is only a matter of time."

The relationship between Davidman and C. S. Lewis had developed to the point that they sought a Christian marriage. This was not straightforward in the Church of England at the time, because she was divorced, but a friend and Anglican priest, the Reverend Peter Bide, performed the ceremony at Davidman's hospital bed on 21 March 1957. The marriage did not win wide approval among Lewis's social circle, and some of his friends and colleagues avoided the new couple.

Upon leaving the hospital a week later, she was taken to The Kilns and soon enjoyed a remission from the cancer. She helped Lewis with his writing, organised his financial records and wardrobe, and had the house renovated and redecorated. The couple went on a belated honeymoon to Wales and then by air to Ireland. In October 1959, a check-up revealed that the cancer had returned, and as of March 1960, was not responding to radiation therapy, as before. In April 1960, Lewis took Davidman on a holiday to Greece to fulfil her lifelong wish to visit there, but her condition worsened quickly upon return from the trip, and she died on 13 July 1960.

As a widower, Lewis wrote A Grief Observed which he published under the pseudonym of N. W. Clerk, describing his feelings and paying tribute to his wife. In the book, he recounts his wavering faith due to the overwhelming grief that he suffered after Davidman's death, and his struggle to regain that faith. Lewis developed a heart condition two years later and went into a coma, from which he recovered, but he died a year later—three years after his wife.

== Shadowlands ==
Shadowlands is a dramatised version of Davidman's life with C. S. Lewis by William Nicholson, which has been filmed twice. In 1985, a television version was made by BBC One, starring Joss Ackland as Lewis and Claire Bloom as Davidman. The BBC production won BAFTA awards for best play and best actress in 1986. Nicholson's work drew in part from Douglas Gresham's book Lenten Lands: My Childhood with Joy Davidman and CS Lewis. It was also performed in London as an award-winning stage play in 1989–90. The play was transferred successfully to Broadway in 1990–91 with Nigel Hawthorne and Jane Alexander starring, and was also revived in London in 2007. A cinema film version was released in 1993, with Anthony Hopkins as Jack (C. S. Lewis) and Debra Winger (in an Academy Award-nominated performance) as Joy Davidman.

== Epitaph ==
C. S. Lewis wrote an epitaph originally on the death of Charles Williams; he adapted it to place on his wife's grave.

Here the whole world (stars, water, air,
And field, and forest, as they were
Reflected in a single mind)
Like cast off clothes was left behind
In ashes, yet with hopes that she,
Re-born from holy poverty,
In lenten lands, hereafter may
Resume them on her Easter Day.

== Works ==
- Letter to a Comrade. Yale University Press, 1938. Foreword by Stephen Vincent Benét. ISBN 978-0-404-53837-8
- Anya. The Macmillan Company, 1940. ASIN B0006AOXFW
- War Poems of the United Nations: The Songs and Battle Cries of a World at War: Three Hundred Poems. One Hundred and Fifty Poets from Twenty Countries. Dial Press, 1943, ASIN B000BWFYL2
- Weeping Bay. The Macmillan Company, 1950. ASIN B0006ASAIS
- Smoke on the Mountain: An Interpretation of the Ten Commandments in Terms of Today. Foreword by C. S. Lewis. Philadelphia: Westminster Press, 1954. ISBN 978-0-664-24680-8
- Davidman, Joy (2009), King, Don W (ed.), Out of My Bone: The Letters of Joy Davidman, William B Eerdmans, ISBN 978-0-8028-6399-7.
- Davidman, Joy (2015), King, Don W. (ed.), A Naked Tree: Love Sonnets to C. S. Lewis and Other Poems, William B. Eerdmans, ISBN 978-0-8028-7288-3.
