= Shadowlands (1993 film) =

- UK theatrical release poster
- Directed by: Richard Attenborough
- Screenplay by: William Nicholson
- Based on: Shadowlands by William Nicholson
- Produced by: Richard Attenborough; Brian Eastman
- Starring: Anthony Hopkins; Debra Winger
- Cinematography: Roger Pratt
- Edited by: Lesley Walker
- Music by: George Fenton
- Production companies: Price Entertainment; Spelling Films International
- Distributed by: United International Pictures (United Kingdom and Ireland); Savoy Pictures (United States and Canada)
- Release dates: 5 December 1993 (Los Angeles premiere); 29 December 1993 (Los Angeles and New York); 4 March 1994 (United Kingdom)
- Running time: 131 minutes
- Countries: United Kingdom; United States
- Language: English
- Budget: $22 million
- Box office: $52 million

Shadowlands is a 1993 biographical drama film about the relationship between academic C. S. Lewis (played by Anthony Hopkins) and Jewish American poet Joy Davidman (played by Debra Winger), her death from cancer, and how this challenged his Christianity. It is loosely based on Lewis's own account in his book A Grief Observed.

The film was directed by Richard Attenborough with a screenplay by William Nicholson based on his 1985 television film and 1989 stage play. The 1985 script began life as I Call It Joy written for Thames Television by Brian Sibley and Norman Stone. Sibley later wrote the book Shadowlands: The True Story of C. S. Lewis and Joy Davidman. The film won the 1993 BAFTA Award for Outstanding British Film. The film marked the last film appearance of English actor Michael Denison.

== Plot ==
In the 1950s, the reserved, middle-aged bachelor C. S. Lewis is an Oxford University academic at Magdalen College and author of The Chronicles of Narnia series of children's books. He meets the married American poet Joy Davidman Gresham and her young son Douglas on their visit to England, not yet knowing the circumstances of Gresham's troubled marriage.

What begins as a formal meeting of two very different minds slowly develops into a feeling of connection and love. Lewis finds his quiet life with his brother Warnie disrupted by the outspoken Gresham, whose uninhibited behaviour sharply contrasts with the rigid sensibilities of the male-dominated university. Each provides the other with new ways of viewing the world.

When Joy is diagnosed with cancer, deeper feelings surface and the two of them marry. Lewis' beliefs are tested as his wife tries to prepare him for her death.

== Cast ==
- Anthony Hopkins as C. S. "Jack" Lewis
- Debra Winger as Joy Davidman
- Edward Hardwicke as Warren "Warnie" Lewis
- Joseph Mazzello as Douglas Gresham
- James Frain as Peter Whistler
- Julian Fellowes as Desmond Arding
- Michael Denison as Harry Harrington
- John Wood as Christopher Riley
- Peter Firth as Dr. Craig
- Tim McMullan as Nick Farrell
- Robert Flemyng as Claude Bird

== Production ==
In October 1990, it was announced that Brian Eastman of Carnival Films had acquired the rights to adapt to film William Nicholson's play Shadowlands, itself an adaptation of Nicholson's 1985 television film commissioned by the BBC. In January 1991, Columbia Pictures acquired rights to the project after its president Frank Price saw the play at Sydney Pollack's suggestion; Eastman agreed to the deal only when Price promised Pollack's involvement with the feature length adaptation. Sean Connery was reportedly attached to star as C. S. Lewis, with production scheduled to begin in late 1991.

By October 1991, Price had left Columbia to become an independent producer again, with the studio placing the project in turnaround and its rights reverting back to Eastman and Price. Nascent distribution company Savoy Pictures took interest in the adaptation and decided to partner with Spelling Films to acquire rights to it. Their joint bid proved successful, notably beating out Caravan Pictures, and Savoy announced Shadowlands as part of their inaugural slate of four films. Richard Attenborough and Anthony Hopkins' involvement was revealed in December 1992; Attenborough was initially serving as only a producer when Pollack was still directing, and showed Hopkins the script when they were working on the 1992 film Chaplin. In February 1993, it was revealed that Debra Winger had been cast as Joy Davidman; Barbra Streisand unsuccessfully lobbied for the role, with Attenborough also considering Sally Field and Anjelica Huston for it.

Production officially began in Oxford on April 3, 1993, with filming locations including the Randolph Hotel and Magdalen College as well as Duke Humfrey's Library and the Radcliffe Camera reading room. Part of the interiors were shot at the Shepperton Studios, while location filming took place in London, Herefordshire and the Great Central Railway. Post-production was completed at Twickenham Studios.

== Reception ==
=== Critical reception ===
Shadowlands received positive reviews from critics. The review aggregator website Rotten Tomatoes reported that 97% of critics have given the film a positive review based on 30 reviews, with an average rating of 8.02/10. The site's critics consensus reads, "Thanks to brilliant performances from Debra Winger and especially Anthony Hopkins, Shadowlands is a deeply moving portrait of British scholar C.S. Lewis's romance with American poet Joy Gresham."

Roger Ebert of the Chicago Sun-Times called the film "intelligent, moving and beautifully acted."

Rita Kempley of The Washington Post described it as "a high-class tear-jerker" and a "literate hankie sopper" and added, "William Nicholson's screenplay brims with substance and wit, though it's essentially a soap opera with a Rhodes scholarship . . . [Winger] and Hopkins lend great tenderness and dignity to what is really a rather corny tale of a love that was meant to be."

In Variety, Emanuel Levy observed, "It's a testament to the nuanced writing of William Nicholson ... that the drama works effectively on both personal and collective levels ... Attenborough opts for modest, unobtrusive direction that serves the material and actors ... Hopkins adds another laurel to his recent achievements. As always, there's music in his speech and nothing is over-deliberate or forced about his acting ... Coming off years of desultory and unimpressive movies, Winger at last plays a role worthy of her talent."

=== Box office ===
Shadowlands grossed $25.8 million in the United States and Canada and then grossed £4,862,314 in the United Kingdom, which surpassed The Piano as the highest-grossing period drama in the UK. Worldwide it grossed $52 million.

== Awards and honours ==
Award	Category	Nominee(s)	Result	Ref.
Academy Awards	Best Actress	Debra Winger	Nominated	
Academy Awards	Best Screenplay – Based on Material Previously Produced or Published	William Nicholson	Nominated	
British Academy Film Awards	Best Film	Richard Attenborough and Brian Eastman	Nominated	
British Academy Film Awards	Outstanding British Film	Richard Attenborough and Brian Eastman	Won	
British Academy Film Awards	Best Direction	Richard Attenborough	Nominated	
British Academy Film Awards	Best Actor in a Leading Role	Anthony Hopkins	Nominated	
British Academy Film Awards	Best Actress in a Leading Role	Debra Winger	Nominated	
British Academy Film Awards	Best Adapted Screenplay	William Nicholson	Nominated	
British Society of Cinematographers Awards	Best Cinematography in a Theatrical Feature Film	Roger Pratt	Nominated	
Heartland Film Festival	Studio Crystal Heart Award	Richard Attenborough	Nominated	
Humanitas Prize	Feature Film Category	William Nicholson	Nominated	
Los Angeles Film Critics Association Awards	Best Actor	Anthony Hopkins (Also for The Remains of the Day)	Won	
Los Angeles Film Critics Association Awards	Best Actress	Debra Winger	Runner-up	
Nastro d'Argento	Best Female Dubbing	Emanuela Rossi (for dubbing Debra Winger in the Italian version)	Nominated	
National Board of Review Awards	Top Ten Films		5th Place	
National Board of Review Awards	Best Actor	Anthony Hopkins (Also for The Remains of the Day)	Won	
National Society of Film Critics Awards	Best Actor	Anthony Hopkins (Also for The Remains of the Day)	3rd Place	
New York Film Critics Circle Awards	Best Actor	Anthony Hopkins (Also for The Remains of the Day)	Runner-up	
Southeastern Film Critics Association Awards	Top Ten Films		8th Place	
Southeastern Film Critics Association Awards	Best Actor	Anthony Hopkins (Also for The Remains of the Day)	Won	
Turkish Film Critics Association Awards	Best Foreign Film		13th Place	

== Year-end lists ==
- 3rd – James Berardinelli, ReelViews
- Top 10 (not ranked) – George Meyer, The Ledger
- Honorable mention – Dan Craft, The Pantagraph

== Changes from the stage play or earlier television production ==
The stage play opens with Lewis giving a talk about the mystery of suffering, whereas this film intersperses a similar talk several times throughout the narrative. The television film opens with Lewis giving a radio broadcast about the sanctity of marriage.

In the stage play as in reality, Lewis and Davidman honeymoon in Greece. In the film, on their honeymoon they look for the "Golden Valley" in Herefordshire, England, as depicted in a painting hanging in Lewis' study.

As in the stage play, though not the earlier television film, Joy has only one son, who appears to be around 10 years old when his mother dies. In the original television film, as in reality, Joy had two sons, Douglas and David, who were both teenagers by the time of their mother’s death.
