= Michael Wade =

Michael Wade may refer to:

- Michael Wade (Canadian actor) (1944–2004), Canadian actor, writer, musician
- Michael Wade (rugby union) (born 1937), English rugby union player
- Michael Wade (Trafalgar Park) (born 1954), British politician
- Michael J. Wade (20th century), American academic biologist
- Mickey Wade (21st century), musician credited on the American albums Letters and Seasons
- Mike Wade (20th century), guitarist and band leader for the original Australian cast recording of Jesus Christ Superstar
