= A Grief Observed =

1961 memoir by C.S. Lewis

- First edition
- Author: C. S. Lewis
- Language: English
- Published: 1961 (Faber and Faber)
- Publication place: United Kingdom
- Media type: Paperback
- Pages: 160
- ISBN: 978-0816401376 (1961 US paperback)
- LC Class: BV4905.2.L4

A Grief Observed is a collection of C. S. Lewis's reflections on his experience of bereavement following the death of his wife, Joy Davidman, in 1960. The book was published in 1961 under the pseudonym N.W. Clerk because Lewis wished to avoid the connection. Though republished in 1963 under his own name after his death, the text still refers to his wife as “H” (her seldom used first name was Helen).

The book is compiled from the four notebooks used by Lewis to vent and explore his grief. He illustrates the everyday trials of life without Joy and explores fundamental questions of faith and theodicy. Lewis' stepson (Joy's son) Douglas Gresham pointed out in his 1994 introduction that the indefinite article 'a' in the title makes it clear that Lewis' grief is not the quintessential experience of the loss of a loved one but just one individual's perspective among countless others.

The book helped inspire a 1985 television movie, Shadowlands, as well as a 1993 film of the same name.

== Summary ==
A Grief Observed explores the processes undergone by the human brain and mind over the course of grieving. The book questions the nature of grief and whether or not returning to normality afterward is even possible within the realm of human existence on earth. Based on a personal journal that he kept, Lewis refers to his wife as "H" throughout the series of reflections, and he reveals that she had died from cancer only three years after their marriage.

Extremely candid, the book details the anger and bewilderment that he felt towards God after H's death as well as his impressions of life without her. The period of his bereavement was marked by a process of moving in and out of various stages of grief and remembrance, and it becomes obvious that it heavily influenced his spirituality.

In fact, Lewis ultimately comes to a revolutionary redefinition of his own characterization of God: experiencing gratitude for having received and experienced the gift of a true love.

The book is divided into four parts. Each is headed with a Roman numeral and has a collection of excerpts from his journals documenting scattered impressions and his continuously evolving state of mind.

== Reactions ==
Lewis exhibits doubt and asks many fundamental questions of faith throughout the work. Because of his candid account of his grief and the doubts he voices, some of his admirers found it troubling. They were disinclined to believe that the Christian writer could be so close to despair. Some thought that it might be a work of fiction. Others, such as his critics, suggested that he was wisest when he was overcome with despair.

When Lewis was first attempting to publish his manuscript, his literary agent, Spencer Curtis Brown, sent it to the publishing company Faber and Faber. One of the directors of the company at the time was T.S. Eliot, who found the book intensely moving.

Madeleine L’Engle, an American author best known for her young adult fiction, wrote a foreword for the 1989 printing of the book. In the foreword, she speaks of her own grief after losing her husband and notes the similarities and differences. She makes a point similar to Douglas Gresham's: each grief is different, even if they bear similarities.

== Relation to other works ==
The book is often compared to another book by Lewis, The Problem of Pain, written approximately twenty years before A Grief Observed.

The Problem of Pain seeks to provide theory behind the pain in the world. A Grief Observed is the reality of the theory in the former book.

It was more difficult to apply the theories that he posited to a pain with which he was so intimately involved. At first, it is hard for Lewis to see the reason of his theories during the anguish of his wife's death but throughout the book, the gradual reacceptance of his theories and the reacceptance of the necessity of suffering can be seen.

Lewis' difficulty is specifically reflected in the following passage from the book: "Is anything more certain than that in all those vast times and spaces, if I were allowed to search them, I should nowhere find her face, her voice, her touch? She died. She is dead. Is the word so difficult to learn?"

Also, Lewis' ultimate resolution of his dilemma is partly articulated in the book: "I will not, if I can help it, shin up either the feathery or the prickly tree. Two widely different convictions press more and more on my mind. One is that the Eternal Vet is even more inexorable and the possible operations even more painful than our severest imaginings can forebode. But the other, that 'all shall be well, and all shall be well, and all manner of thing shall be well'".
