= Nightmare Alley (2021 film) =

2021 neo-noir film by Guillermo del Toro

- Theatrical release poster
- Directed by: Guillermo del Toro
- Screenplay by: Guillermo del Toro; Kim Morgan
- Based on: Nightmare Alley by William Lindsay Gresham
- Produced by: J. Miles Dale; Guillermo del Toro; Bradley Cooper
- Starring: Bradley Cooper; Cate Blanchett; Toni Collette; Willem Dafoe; Richard Jenkins; Rooney Mara; Ron Perlman; Mary Steenburgen; David Strathairn
- Cinematography: Dan Laustsen
- Edited by: Cam McLauchlin
- Music by: Nathan Johnson
- Production company: Double Dare You Productions
- Distributed by: Searchlight Pictures
- Release dates: December 1, 2021 (Alice Tully Hall, New York City); December 17, 2021 (United States)
- Running time: 150 minutes
- Countries: United States; Mexico; Canada
- Language: English
- Budget: $60 million
- Box office: $39.6 million

Nightmare Alley is a 2021 neo-noir psychological thriller film co-written and directed by Guillermo del Toro, and based on the 1946 novel of the same name by William Lindsay Gresham. A co-production between Searchlight Pictures and Double Dare You Productions, the film stars Bradley Cooper as a charming and ambitious carnival worker with a mysterious past who takes big risks to boost his career. Cate Blanchett, Toni Collette, Willem Dafoe, Richard Jenkins, Rooney Mara, Ron Perlman, Mary Steenburgen, and David Strathairn also star. It is the second feature film adaptation of Gresham's novel, following the 1947 film.

Del Toro announced the film in 2017. He produced it alongside J. Miles Dale and Cooper. Frequent collaborator Dan Laustsen was the cinematographer, and Nathan Johnson replaced Alexandre Desplat as its composer. Principal photography began in January 2020 in Toronto, Ontario, but was shut down in March 2020 due to the COVID-19 pandemic. Production resumed in September 2020 and concluded that December.

Nightmare Alley premiered at Alice Tully Hall in New York City on December 1, 2021, and was theatrically released in the United States on December 17, 2021, by Searchlight Pictures. It received generally positive reviews from critics and grossed $39.6 million worldwide against a $60 million production budget. It received four Academy Award nominations, including Best Picture. A black-and-white version subtitled Vision in Darkness and Light was released in select cities starting on January 14, 2022.

== Plot ==
In 1939, Stan Carlisle hides the corpse of his deceased father under the floorboards of a run-down house before setting the house ablaze. That evening, he walks into a traveling carnival and watches a geek show in which a deranged man eats a live chicken. Stan runs into the carnival's strongman, and is offered a temporary job for the night. He is subsequently convinced by carnival owner, Clem, to stay, and begins working with Madame Zeena, the carnival's clairvoyant act, and her alcoholic husband, Pete.

Stan begins courting fellow performer, Molly, and asks her to leave the carnival with him, but she refuses. Madame Zeena and Pete teach Stan how to use the coded language and cold reading tricks in their act, while warning him against pretending to speak to the dead. Stan also learns that Clem hires troubled alcoholics to be his geeks, then gives them opium-laced alcohol so they stay. One night, Pete asks Stan for alcohol and is found dead the next day.

Local law enforcement raid the carnival after learning about the geek show. Stan uses his cold reading skills to placate the local sheriff and manipulate him into showing leniency. Shortly thereafter, Molly agrees to leave the carnival with Stan.

Two years later, Stan runs a successful psychic act for the wealthy elite of Buffalo. Molly performs as his assistant, but their relationship has deteriorated as Stan demands perfection from Molly. During a performance, psychologist Dr. Lilith Ritter interrupts and tries to expose their act. Stan bests and humiliates Ritter with his cold reading skills, then reads the man sitting with Ritter, Judge Kimball. After the show, Kimball asks Stan to help him and his wife communicate with their dead son. Stan agrees over Molly's objections.

Stan meets with Ritter to purchase information on Kimball. Ritter agrees, but requests Stan sit for a psychotherapy session in lieu of payment. That night, Molly invites Madame Zeena and other performers to the hotel for an impromptu party. Madame Zeena warns Stan not to do Kimball's reading, claiming to have read his plans from tarot.

Stan performs a successful reading for Kimball and his wife and is paid handsomely. He offers to split the fee with Ritter, but she declines, instead agreeing to hide the money from Molly. Stan informs Ritter that Kimball has offered to introduce him to Ezra Grindle, a very wealthy industrialist and her former patient. At Stan's request, Ritter reluctantly provides incomplete information about Grindle; Stan steals the rest from her records, learning that Grindle forced an abortion on a young woman named Dorrie, and that she likely died from the botched procedure. After successfully convincing Grindle that he is a true medium with the stolen information, Stan starts an affair with Ritter and begins drinking.

Stan holds regular sessions with Grindle for exorbitant fees, while Grindle begins to increasingly demand that Stan make Dorrie's spirit materialize. Stan plans to have Molly pose as Dorrie, which she agrees to do only if she can leave Stan afterwards. On the day Stan plans to "materialize" Dorrie, Kimball's wife murders her husband and commits suicide to be reunited with their son, inspired by Stan's previous reading for them. That evening, Grindle confesses to Stan that he hurt more women after Dorrie's death. Molly makes her appearance as Dorrie immediately after, but her disguise fails when Grindle hugs her. Infuriated, Grindle strikes Molly, provoking Stan to beat him to death. Horrified by the events of the night, Molly leaves.

Stan arrives at Ritter's office to retrieve his savings, but she withholds almost all of it, revealing that she was manipulating him all along. He attacks her but is forced to escape when security arrives. A flashback reveals he killed his bedridden father by intentionally exposing him to hypothermia before burning the house down.

Months later, Stan, now homeless and an alcoholic, sees ads for Madame Zeena in a newspaper. Stan finds a new carnival and learns that his old carnival went out of business. He desperately pitches his mentalist act to the new owner, who rejects it based on Stan's appearance and the act being out of fashion. The owner then offers him a drink and temporary work as a geek, using the same pitch Clem described earlier. Recognizing the trap, Stan nevertheless accepts the job, claiming he was born for it before breaking down laughing.

== Cast ==
- Bradley Cooper as Stanton "Stan" Carlisle
- Cate Blanchett as Dr. Lilith Ritter
- Toni Collette as Zeena the Seer
- Willem Dafoe as Clem Hoatley
- Richard Jenkins as Ezra Grindle
- Rooney Mara as Molly Cahill
- Ron Perlman as Bruno
- Mary Steenburgen as Mrs. Kimball
- David Strathairn as Pete
- Holt McCallany as Anderson
- Peter MacNeill as Judge Kimball
- Mark Povinelli as the Major
- Jim Beaver as Sheriff Jedediah Judd
- David Hewlett as Dr. Elrood
- Tim Blake Nelson as Carny Boss
- Clifton Collins Jr. as Funhouse Jack
- Paul Anderson as Geek #1
- Lara Jean Chorostecki as Louise Hoatley

In addition, Romina Power, daughter of actor Tyrone Power, who played Stanton in the 1947 film, has an uncredited cameo as a viewer of Stanton's show.

== Production ==
=== Pre-production ===
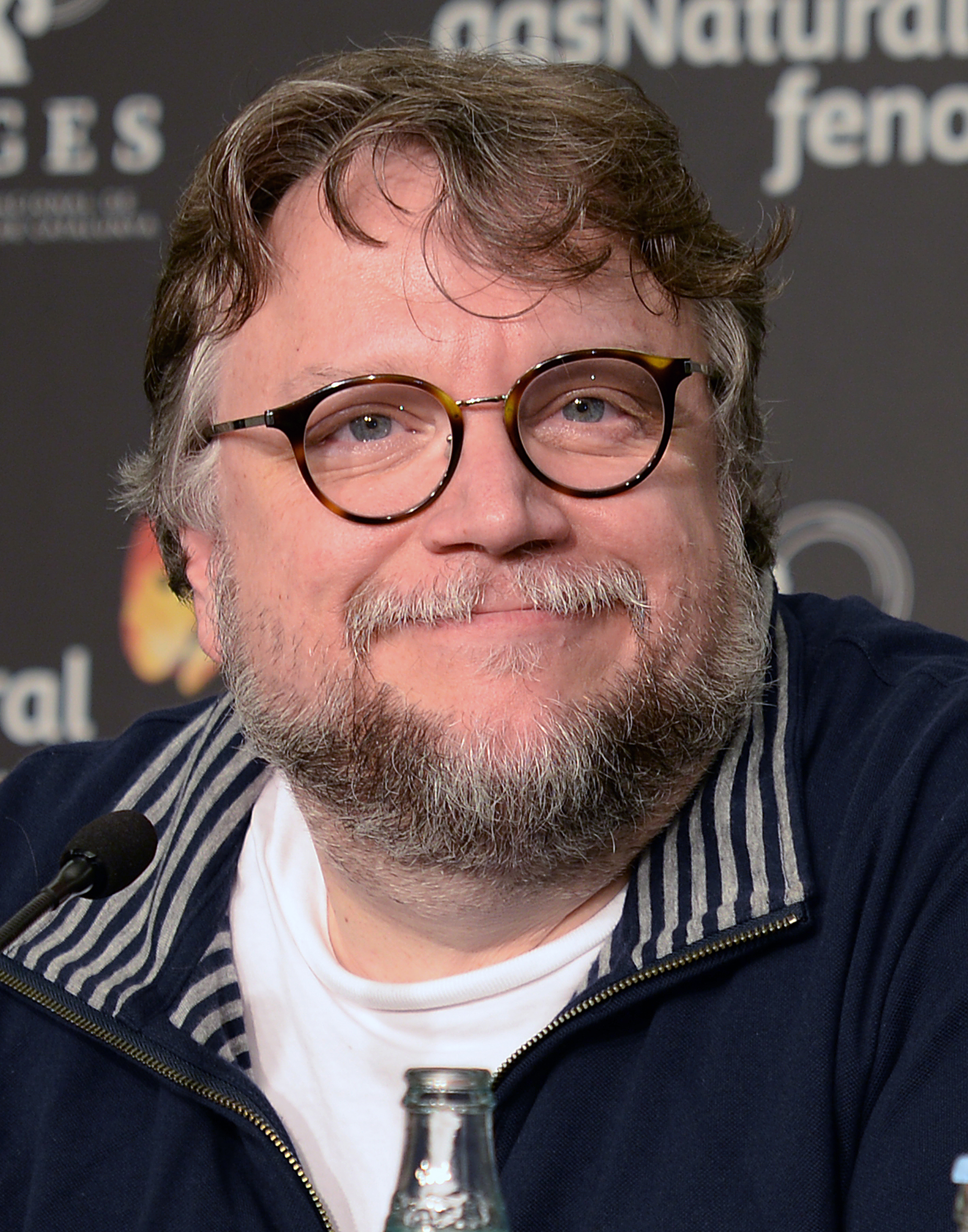
Director, co-producer and co-writer Guillermo del Toro

The project was announced in December 2017, when Guillermo del Toro revealed that he would be attached to write and direct a film adaptation of William Lindsay Gresham's 1946 novel. The film marks a departure for del Toro, as it contains no supernatural elements, as opposed to his previous films. Del Toro considered this to be a standalone adaptation of Gresham's novel, as opposed to a remake of the 1947 film version starring Tyrone Power. He stated: "Well, what it is is that book was given to me in 1992 by Ron Perlman before I saw the Tyrone Power movie, and I loved the book. My adaptation that I've done with [co-writer] Kim Morgan is not necessarily—the entire book is impossible, it's a saga. But there are elements that are darker in the book, and it's the first chance I have—in my short films I wanted to do noir. It was horror and noir. And now is the first chance I have to do a real underbelly of society type of movie. [There are] no supernatural elements. Just a straight, really dark story." Del Toro also revealed the film would be aiming for an R-rating, saying: "big R. Double R!"

Dan Laustsen and Alexandre Desplat were announced to serve as the film's cinematographer and composer, respectively, both having previously collaborated with del Toro in The Shape of Water (2017).

=== Casting ===
In April 2019, Leonardo DiCaprio entered negotiations to star in the film, but by June 2019, Bradley Cooper entered early negotiations to replace DiCaprio. Del Toro stated that he and Cooper quickly connected with each other when del Toro met Cooper in the latter's house to discuss the role: "We started talking script and then this started mirroring our thoughts about life and the way we viewed the world. We entered strange, darker times that led to 'Nightmare Alley' for me, and [changed the] way I view the world." Del Toro also believed that Cooper's experience as a director helped strengthen their connection, stating, "A director is an actor and an actor is a director. There is no separation of the craft... that took a while for me to get used to. I normally create and guide these little Fabergé eggs of movies, obsessively detailed. All of a sudden we were on an adventure. I will never shoot a movie the same way." Del Toro further discussed his collaborative relationship with Cooper while filming:

Curiosity and integrity are the two things[;] they are very bonded [...] We're like truffle hunters, smelling for that, looking for certain truth, not verisimilitude or realism but truth which is a higher form of telling a story. How we get to it is only through curiosity. When we have collaborators, the main reward is a point of view that you can literally bounce off, or get bounced off, and seek for the truth... I found it a blessing at age 56 in this movie to find the marvel of complicity and curiosity. 'Is this all we can do with that scene, with that shot?' You keep seeking.

According to Deadline Hollywood's Justin Kroll, Jennifer Lawrence was in talks for the Dr. Lilith Ritter role alongside DiCaprio. In August 2019, Cate Blanchett was in negotiations to join the film. Both Cooper and Blanchett were confirmed to star the next month, along with the addition of Rooney Mara. Toni Collette and David Strathairn were added in September, with Strathairn replacing Michael Shannon who dropped out due to scheduling conflicts. Collette praised del Toro's capabilities as a director, and described the film as a "period drama" and "unlike some of his other work." Willem Dafoe was cast in October and Holt McCallany would join the next month. Ron Perlman and Richard Jenkins were both confirmed in January 2020. In February 2020, Mary Steenburgen and Romina Power, the daughter of Tyrone Power, joined the cast of the film. In March 2020, Paul Anderson joined the cast of the film.

=== Filming ===
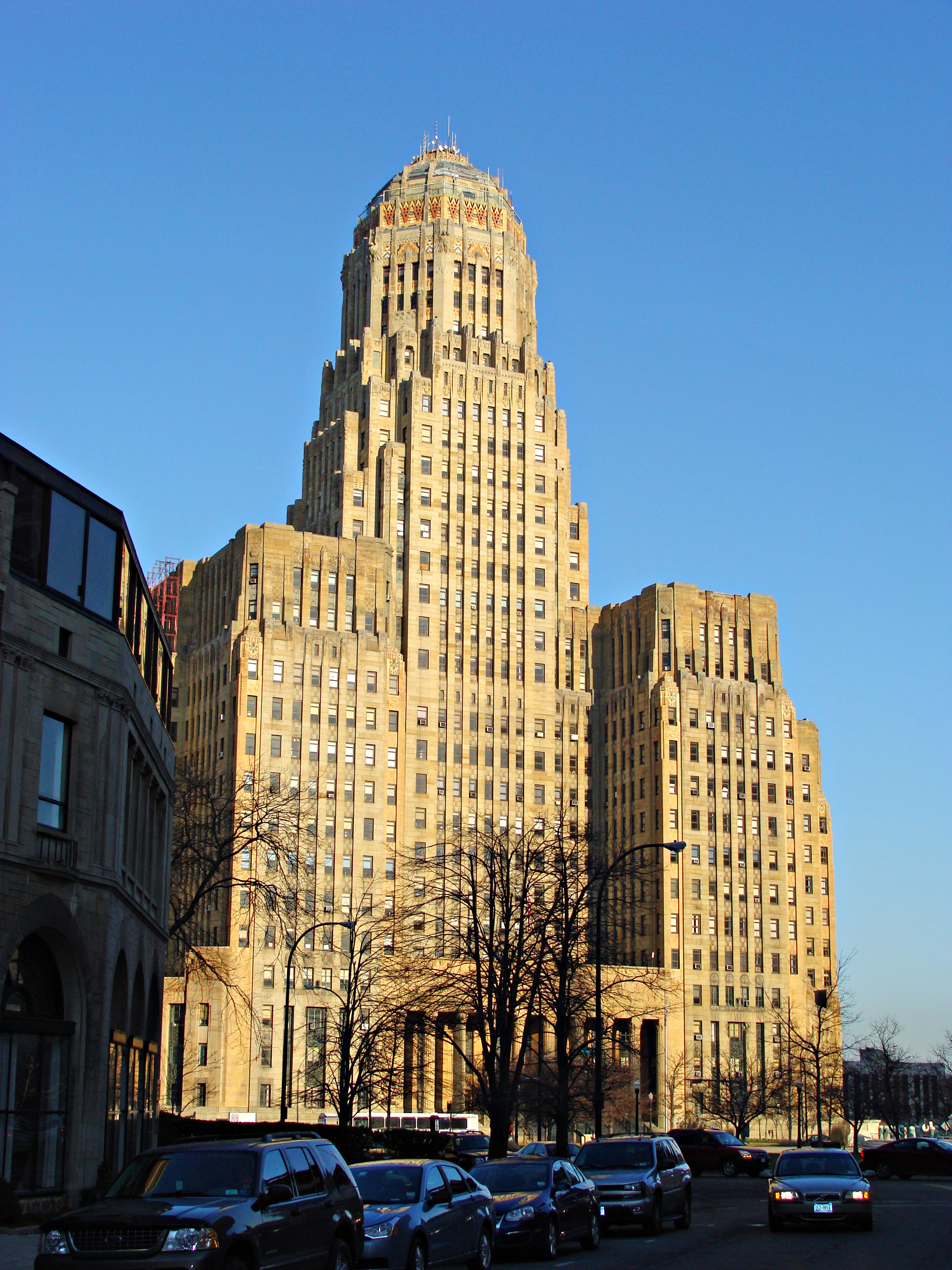
Buffalo City Hall was used for part of filming.

Principal photography began in January 2020 in Toronto, Canada. Production temporarily moved to Buffalo, New York in February 2020, in order for del Toro to take advantage of the city's architecture and unfamiliar setting: "I wanted to find a city that was really interesting to visit for an audience, that was not a city they were overtly familiar with." Scenes were filmed in and outside of Buffalo's Niagara Square and City Hall, and required the use of fake snow, much to the surprise of the crew, as Buffalo is widely known for its heavy snowfall during the winter season.

Principal photography was initially set to begin in September 2019, but was delayed to accommodate Cooper's schedule. "We shot the second half before the first half," Cooper revealed. "We didn't want to do it that way. Things happened to us, with sets and other actors' availability and water, the snow and all that. I was the cause. I had moved to New York and said, 'I can't do it right now. Let me get settled.'" In March 2020, Del Toro himself shut down production on the film after rising concerns regarding the COVID-19 pandemic: "We stopped the shoot a week before [the industry shut down] [...] That saved us. Nobody to my knowledge in the cast or the crew got coronavirus." Del Toro later reflected that "Stopping was not mandatory back then, but we both felt if we don't stop now and someone gets sick — we said, 'we gotta stop.' Nobody was expecting it. Everybody went to lunch and came back six months later." Searchlight's parent, Walt Disney Studios, officially halted production on the film soon after.

Del Toro revealed that when production was shut down, approximately 45% of the film was shot, and he spent his time editing available footage during the hiatus. Del Toro also composed an 80-page safety precaution guideline to be used when production was to resume, which he was hoping to do in late 2020. Variety reported that Blanchett had completed her scenes prior to the shutdown.

Production resumed in September 2020 in Toronto. In an interview, Collette discussed some of the film's safety protocols: "[...] I've got to say, I think, you couldn't get any safer than a film set. They're so regimented and disciplined and demanding in terms of having to toe the line and everyone does their best to not get it. You really are in a bubble and the whole of Toronto is in masks and you're just sanitizing your hands a million times a day and trying not to be in big crowds and you just have to be mindful of that. Especially when you're working, because there's a bigger risk there. It's not just you, it's everyone else, you know?" Collette also revealed that del Toro had shot almost four hours of footage. By November 2020, principal photography was completed and re-shoots had commenced. Production officially wrapped in December 2020.

Del Toro and Cooper reflected that the unexpected shooting schedule benefited the film's structure. Del Toro remarked that "It was a blessing [...] I believe wholeheartedly life gives you what you need, not what you want. You have a window to look at everything. It was incredible. We got to see these characters, when [Stanton Carlisle] was full of himself and arrogant and certain and seeking. We were able to go back six months in between all this and were able to analyze and see not only that character but what we needed to rewrite to be able to go back to a set. If your pores are open, the movie finds you. Each movie tells you what it needs." Cooper further stated that "This movie needed that rigor. Thank god we had that time. As simple a story is, it demanded all our concentration and focus, all that time. I don't think we realized how much it demanded of us at the beginning. That was the discovery. There is arrogance. You think you can do it, then, 'how is this possible?'"

Cooper further reflected on his relationship with del Toro over the course of filming:

We [made] Nightmare Alley for the last two and a half years [...] It was a unique experience, going through the pandemic, taking six months off and revisiting it. We not only become lifelong friends, but it was an artistic experience.

== Music ==
Due to scheduling conflicts, Desplat exited the film, resulting in Nathan Johnson being brought in as replacement.

== Release ==
Nightmare Alley had its world premiere at the Alice Tully Hall in New York on December 1, 2021, accompanied by simultaneous screenings at the Academy Museum of Motion Pictures in Los Angeles and the TIFF Bell Lightbox in Toronto. The film was theatrically released on December 17, 2021, after having been rescheduled from its original release date of December 3, 2021.

On December 17, 2021, the day of the film's release, Searchlight Pictures announced that a black-and-white version of the film, titled Nightmare Alley: Vision in Darkness and Light, would be released the following month, on January 14, 2022, in select theaters in Los Angeles only, for up to 6 days. In January 2022, following the success of the showings, the version was announced to be broadening to other select cities. The black-and-white film expanded to 1,020 theaters nationwide on January 28, 2022.

The film was released on the streaming services Hulu and HBO Max on February 1, 2022 and on Ultra HD Blu-ray, Blu-Ray and DVD on March 22, 2022, by 20th Century Studios Home Entertainment. The film was also released on Disney+ internationally on March 9, 2022 in Australia and New Zealand as part of the Star content hub then on March 16, 2022 in all other territories.

By March 20, 2022, the film had been streamed on HBO Max and Hulu in a combined 3.1 million households in the United States according to Samba TV, including 2.1 million since the Oscar nomination announcements on February 8, the highest total of any Best Picture nominee.

== Reception ==
=== Box office ===
Nightmare Alley grossed $11.3 million in the United States and Canada, and $28.2 million in other territories for a worldwide total of $39.6 million.

Nightmare Alley made $225,000 from Thursday night previews and an estimated $1.19 million by Friday. Its low opening was attributed to it being primarily meant for the audiences in the older age ranges (who had avoided going out to see movies amidst the COVID-19 pandemic), low interest among the movie-going audience, and the release of Spider-Man: No Way Home on the same date. It went on to debut to $2.8 million from 2,145 theatres during the weekend, finishing fifth at the box office. Men made up 56% of the audience during its opening, with those in the age range of 25–54 composing 55% of ticket sales and those above 45 composing 29%. The ethnic breakdown of the audience showed that 63% were Caucasian, 11% Hispanic and Latino Americans, 9% Black American, and 17% Asian or other. In its second weekend, the film earned $1.2 million. In its third, the film dropped out of the box office top ten, finishing eleventh with $966,875.

=== Critical response ===
On the review aggregator website Rotten Tomatoes, 80% of 349 critics' reviews are positive, with an average rating of 7.4/10. The website's consensus reads: "While it may not hit quite as hard as the original, Guillermo del Toro's Nightmare Alley is a modern noir thriller with a pleasantly pulpy spin." Metacritic, which uses a weighted average, assigned a score of 70 out of 100 based on 55 critics, indicating "generally favorable reviews". Audiences polled by CinemaScore gave the film an average grade of "B" on an A+ to F scale, while those at PostTrak gave it a 72% positive score, with 49% saying they would definitely recommend it.

Mark Kermode of The Observer gave the film 5 out of 5, writing: "From its bruised colour palette to its spiralling descent into madness and degradation, this is deliciously damnable fare, looking back through the prism of Del Toro's adventurous oeuvre to the existential angst of his vampiric feature debut, Cronos." Linda Marric of The Jewish Chronicle also gave 5 out of 5, writing: "Del Toro employs a mixture of stylish old Hollywood sensibilities with B movie tropes to bring us an engaging and gorgeously acted psychological thriller." Clarisse Loughrey of The Independent also gave the film 5 out of 5, writing: "Del Toro can do worldbuilding in his sleep, but you might also find Cooper's brittle performance, filled with such elemental sadness, hard to shake off. Nightmare Alley is the shadow that lingers." Peter Bradshaw of The Guardian gave the film 4 out of 5, praising it as "a spectacular noir melodrama boasting gruesomely enjoyable performances and freaky twists."

Robbie Collin of The Daily Telegraph was more critical, giving the film 2 out of 5 stars and describing it as "an act of origami-level homage: it's all folded together in impressively fiddly ways, but the result is an angular, inert approximation, lacking in the original's breath or heat." Kevin Maher of The Times also gave the film 2 out of 5 stars, praising its set design, but added: "there's little else in this drastically overstretched narrative (150 minutes!) to hold any attention beyond a cursory awareness that, yes, we’re watching an oddly literal melodrama about bad people doing very bad things, very slowly."

Martin Scorsese authored an essay in the Los Angeles Times urging readers to seek out the film, crediting Del Toro's films as being "lovingly and passionately crafted" and arguing that Nightmare Alley is "truer to the animating spirit of film noir than the many 'homages' that have been made over the years and are still being made now."

== Accolades ==
Award	Date of ceremony	Category	Recipients	Results	Ref.
AARP Movies for Grownups Awards	March 18, 2022	Best Director	Guillermo del Toro	Nominated	
AARP Movies for Grownups Awards	March 18, 2022	Best Ensemble	Nightmare Alley	Won	
AARP Movies for Grownups Awards	March 18, 2022	Best Screenwriter	Guillermo del Toro and Kim Morgan	Nominated	
AARP Movies for Grownups Awards	March 18, 2022	Best Supporting Actor	David Strathairn	Nominated	
AARP Movies for Grownups Awards	March 18, 2022	Best Supporting Actress	Cate Blanchett	Nominated	
Academy Awards	March 27, 2022	Best Picture	Guillermo del Toro, J. Miles Dale, and Bradley Cooper	Nominated	
Academy Awards	March 27, 2022	Best Cinematography	Dan Laustsen	Nominated	
Academy Awards	March 27, 2022	Best Costume Design	Luis Sequeira	Nominated	
Academy Awards	March 27, 2022	Best Production Design	Tamara Deverell and Shane Vieau	Nominated	
American Cinematheque - Tribute To The Crafts	January 26, 2022	Feature Film - Production Designer/Set Decorator	Tamara Deverell and Shane Vieau	Won	
American Society Of Cinematographers	March 20, 2022	Feature Film	Dan Laustsen, ASC, DFF	Nominated	
Art Directors Guild	March 5, 2022	Period Feature Film	Tamara Deverell	Won	
British Academy Film Awards	March 13, 2022	Best Cinematography	Dan Laustsen	Nominated	
British Academy Film Awards	March 13, 2022	Best Costume Design	Luis Sequeira	Nominated	
British Academy Film Awards	March 13, 2022	Best Production Design	Tamara Deverell and Shane Vieau	Nominated	
Critics Choice Movie Awards	March 13, 2022	Best Picture	Nightmare Alley	Nominated	
Critics Choice Movie Awards	March 13, 2022	Best Director	Guillermo del Toro	Nominated	
Critics Choice Movie Awards	March 13, 2022	Best Cinematography	Dan Laustsen	Nominated	
Critics Choice Movie Awards	March 13, 2022	Best Costume Design	Luis Sequeira	Nominated	
Critics Choice Movie Awards	March 13, 2022	Best Production Design	Tamara Deverell and Shane Vieau	Nominated	
Critics Choice Movie Awards	March 13, 2022	Best Score	Nathan Johnson	Nominated	
Critics Choice Movie Awards	March 13, 2022	Best Hair and Makeup	Nightmare Alley	Nominated	
Critics Choice Movie Awards	March 13, 2022	Best Visual Effects	Nightmare Alley	Nominated	
Georgia Film Critics Association	January 15, 2022	Best Production Design	Tamara Deverell and Shane Vieau	Nominated	
Hollywood Critics Association	February 28, 2022	Best Director	Guillermo del Toro	Nominated	
Hollywood Critics Association	February 28, 2022	Best Production Design	Tamara Deverell	Won	
Hollywood Music in Media Awards	November 17, 2021	Best Original Score in a Feature Film	Nathan Johnson	Nominated	
Houston Film Critics Society	January 19, 2022	Best Cinematography	Dan Laustsen	Nominated	
Houston Film Critics Society	January 19, 2022	Best Director	Guillermo del Toro	Nominated	
Houston Film Critics Society	January 19, 2022	Best Ensemble Cast	Nightmare Alley	Nominated	
Dallas–Fort Worth Film Critics Association	December 20, 2021	Best Picture	Nightmare Alley	Nominated	
Los Angeles Film Critics Association Awards	December 18, 2021	Best Production Design	Tamara Deverell	Runner-up	
Motion Picture Sound Editors	March 13, 2022	Outstanding Achievement in Sound Editing – Feature Dialogue / ADR	Jill Purdy and Nelson Ferreira	Won	
Motion Picture Sound Editors	March 13, 2022	Outstanding Achievement in Sound Editing – Feature Effects / Foley	Nathan Robitaille, Dashen Naidoo, Chelsea Body, Goro Koyama and Andy Malcolm	Nominated	
Motion Picture Sound Editors	March 13, 2022	Outstanding Achievement in Sound Editing – Feature Music	Clint Bennett, Kevin Banks and Cecile Tournesac	Nominated	
National Board of Review	December 2, 2021	Top Ten Films	Nightmare Alley	Nominated	
Online Film Critics Society	January 24, 2022	Best Production Design	Tamara Deverell	Nominated	
San Diego Film Critics Society	January 10, 2022	Best Director	Guillermo Del Toro	Nominated	
San Diego Film Critics Society	January 10, 2022	Best Supporting Actress	Cate Blanchett	Nominated	
San Diego Film Critics Society	January 10, 2022	Best Cinematography	Dan Laustsen	Nominated	
San Diego Film Critics Society	January 10, 2022	Best Production Design	Tamara Deverell	Won	
San Diego Film Critics Society	January 10, 2022	Best Sound Design	Nathan Robitaille	Nominated	
San Diego Film Critics Society	January 10, 2022	Best Adapted Screenplay	Guillermo del Toro & Kim Morgan	Runner-up	
San Francisco Bay Area Film Critics Circle	January 10, 2022	Best Production Design	Tamara Deverell	Won	
San Francisco Bay Area Film Critics Circle	January 10, 2022	Best Cinematography	Dan Laustsen	Nominated	
Saturn Awards	October 25, 2022	Best Thriller Film	Nightmare Alley	Won	
Saturn Awards	October 25, 2022	Best Actress	Cate Blanchett	Nominated	
Saturn Awards	October 25, 2022	Best Supporting Actor	Richard Jenkins	Nominated	
Saturn Awards	October 25, 2022	Best Director	Guillermo del Toro	Nominated	
Saturn Awards	October 25, 2022	Best Writing	Guillermo del Toro and Kim Morgan	Won	
Saturn Awards	October 25, 2022	Best Music	Nathan Johnson	Nominated	
Saturn Awards	October 25, 2022	Best Editing	Cam McLauchin	Nominated	
Saturn Awards	October 25, 2022	Best Production Design	Tamara Deverell	Won	
Saturn Awards	October 25, 2022	Best Costume Design	Luis Sequeira	Nominated	
Saturn Awards	October 25, 2022	Best Make-Up	Jo-Ann MacNeil, Mike Hill and Megan Many	Nominated	
Saturn Awards	March 8, 2026	Best 4K Home Media Release	Nightmare Alley	Nominated	
Seattle Film Critics Society	January 17, 2022	Best Production Design	Tamara Deverell and Shane Vieau	Nominated	
Screen Actors Guild Awards	February 27, 2022	Outstanding Performance by a Female Actor in a Supporting Role	Cate Blanchett	Nominated	
Set Decorators Society of America Awards	February 22, 2022	Best Achievement in Décor/Design of a Period Feature Film	Tamara Deverell and Shane Vieau	Nominated	
St. Louis Film Critics Association	December 19, 2021	Best Production Design	Tamara Deverell	Nominated	
Visual Effects Society Awards	March 8, 2022	Outstanding Supporting Visual Effects in a Photoreal Feature	Dennis Berardi, Ryan MacDuff, Mark Hammond, David Roby and Geoff Hill	Nominated	
Washington D.C. Area Film Critics Association	December 6, 2021	Best Production Design	Tamara Deverell and Shane Vieau	Nominated	
Writers Guild of America Awards	March 20, 2022	Best Adapted Screenplay	Guillermo del Toro and Kim Morgan	Nominated	
