= Lighthouse Property Insurance Corporation =

- Industry: Insurance
- Founded: 2008; 17 years ago
- Defunct: 2022
- Key people: Patrick White

Lighthouse Property Insurance Corporation (“Lighthouse”) was a Louisiana domestic property and casualty insurance company. It was founded in 2008 under the leadership of Ron Chapman and Mike Toffoli. Lighthouse initially operated profitably in the states of Louisiana and South Carolina.

After Toffoli left in 2013 to join Access Home Insurance Company, and Chapman later retired, Lighthouse expanded into North Carolina and Texas.

In 2017, Lighthouse merged with Prepared Insurance Company to expand into Florida. Lighthouse was reported to have more than 13,000 policies in Florida and Louisiana by 2020 and thousands more in other states.

The expansion into North Carolina, Texas and Florida, were made under the leadership of Patrick White, who replaced Chapman as Lighthouse’s President. White, who had had no previous property and casualty insurance experience and was the son of Larry White, Lighthouse ’s ultimate primary shareholder, was known for bringing fresh ideas to his management of Lighthouse.

In August 2021, after reporting multiple years of non-storm related operating losses, as well as substantial storm losses due to multiple hurricanes making landfall in Louisiana during 2020, the Louisiana Department of Insurance placed Lighthouse in a confidential "conservation proceeding" which allowed it time to raise $65 million in new capital investment. It was the first time in many years that a Louisiana insurance company had been allowed to be covered by such a conservation proceeding.

In 2022, after incurring substantial additional storm losses due to Hurricane Ida, which made landfall in southern Louisiana in August 2021, the Louisiana Department of Insurance deemed Lighthouse insolvent, and placed it in liquidation proceedings.

In April 2024, Patrick White and Larry White personally, as well as certain affiliated family trusts and foundations, were served a $65 million lawsuit alleging they willfully defrauded and materially misrepresented Lighthouse’s financial condition, resulting in investors losing the entire $65 million in only a matter of months. The lawsuit is still pending.

== See also ==
- Michael Wade (OBE)
