= Dane Court, Pyrford =

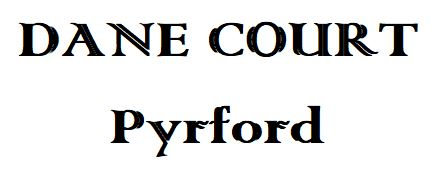

Location
- Coldharbour Road; Pyrford; Near Woking, Surrey; England
- Coordinates: 51.32844°N 0.50844°W

Information
- Type: Preparatory school
- Motto: Non scholae sed vitae (discimus) - Not for school but for life (we learn)
- Established: 1867; 159 years ago
- Founder: Rev Henry John Graham
- Gender: Boys
- Age: 4 to 13
- Houses: (known as 'Patrols'): Cheetahs, Leopards, Lions, Pumas, Panthers, Ravens, Seagulls
- Colours: Beige and red
- Publication: Sunrise

Dane Court was an independent boarding and day preparatory school for boys aged 4 to 13 which was based at several sites in its 114 year history, but principally at Pyrford, Surrey, England. The school closed permanently in 1981.

== History ==
The school was founded in 1867 when Rev Henry John Graham began educating 'three or four boys' at Garsington Rectory for entry into the public schools and the Royal Navy, the first of which was H. Rider Haggard. Graham continued as an educator when he became Vicar of Ashampstead in 1871, with several pupils boarding with him and his wife, Jessie, in the vicarage. By 1883, he had opened his first school, which was known as The Mount School at Mount Lodge, St Leonard's on Sea, before expanding to larger premises on St Peter's Road in Parkstone, Dorset in 1900. It was here that the school first became known as Dane Court.

Rev Graham retired in 1911 and the assistant master, Hugh Pooley (younger brother of Sir Ernest Pooley Bt), took over as headmaster. He and his Danish wife, Michaela (née Krohn), would run Dane Court together for the next 50 years. (It is a myth that the school derived its name from Mrs Pooley's nationality.)

The school was split into two in 1921 with the Pooleys taking on the premises and pupils of an unrelated Surrey school called Dean Court (founded 1909, under Henry Edmund Kingsford) and reopening it as Dane Court, Pyrford.

=== Dane Court, Parkstone ===
The extant Dane Court, Parkstone was renamed The Daison in 1921 but reverted to Dane Court, Parkstone by 1923. It continued for 20 years under a succession of headmasters, beginning with Harold Wilton Turner and Paul Phipps. In 1933, Rev Cecil Ayerst became headmaster and opened a pre-prep department for boys aged 5 to 8. In 1936, he relocated the prep school element to new premises at Longham, rebranding as Holmwood Park Preparatory School, which had ceased to operate by 1943 following a scandal involving a subsequent proprietor. Dane Court, Parkstone continued as a pre-prep under headmaster Gordon Holligan, but had been converted to a Barnardo's Home for Boys by 1941.

=== Dane Court, Pyrford ===
Hugh and Michaela Pooley ran Dane Court successfully at Pyrford from 1921 to 1939, but relocated the school to Whatcombe House in Lower Whatcombe near Blandford Forum when the Pyrford site was requisitioned by the War Office for the duration of the war. They were able to re-open in Pyrford in May 1946 and ran both schools in tandem with the help of an additional 'Master in Charge', Guy Boys, a former Bryanston School master. In 1950 they terminated the lease at Whatcombe House, which was taken up by Marchant-Holliday School and several other institutions, before reverting to its owners in 1968.

The Pooleys retired in 1961 and headship passed to their son Robin Krohn Pooley. The school closed permanently in 1981 and the site was redeveloped into residential property. The Dane Court Society of alumni held its last meeting on 19 September 2009.

== Headship ==
=== At locations prior to Parkstone (1867 – 1900) ===
- 1867 Rev Henry John Graham

=== At Dane Court, Parkstone (1900 – c.1940) ===
- (continued) Rev Henry John Graham
- 1911 Hugh Francis Pooley (& Mrs Michaela Pooley)
- 1921 Harold Wilton Turner
- 1922 Harold Wilton Turner & Paul Campbell Phipps (jointly)
- By 1932 Paul Campbell Phipps (solely)
- 1933 Rev Cecil William Ayerst
- 1935 Gordon Raymond Holligan (until at least 1937)

=== At Dane Court, Pyrford (1921 – 1939; 1946 – 1981) & Dane Court, Whatcombe House (1940-1950) ===
- (continued) Hugh Francis Pooley (& Mrs Michaela Pooley)
  - 1946-49 Additional 'Master in Charge' Guy Henry Welton Boys
- 1961 Robin Krohn Pooley

== Notable former pupils ==
=== At Garsington Rectory ===
- H. Rider Haggard (1856 – 1925), Victorian adventure author; school's first pupil, aged 9 or 10

=== At Ashampstead Vicarage ===
- Edward Arthur Haggard (1860 – 1925), army officer and author; brother of H. Rider Haggard

=== At Dane Court, Parkstone ===
- Admiral of the Fleet Sir Caspar John (1903 – 1984), Royal Navy officer; son of artists Augustus and Ida John

=== At Dane Court, Pyrford (pre-war) ===
- Peter Baden-Powell, 2nd Baron Baden-Powell (1913 – 1962), Southern Rhodesian policeman; British politician and businessman; son of Lieutenant-General Robert Baden-Powell, 1st Baron Baden-Powell and Olave St. Clair Soames
- Olaf Pooley (1914 – 2015), son of headmaster Hugh Pooley; actor (notably as Professor Stahlman in the seven-part Doctor Who serial Inferno), screenwriter and painter
- Roger Lancelyn Green (1918 – 1987), biographer and children's writer (Tellers of Tales, 1946); encouraged close friend C. S. Lewis to publish The Lion, the Witch and the Wardrobe
- Lucian Freud OM CH (1922 – 2011), painter and draughtsman; one of the foremost 20th-century English portraitists

=== At Dane Court, Whatcombe House ===
- Richard Bawden (born 1936), painter, printmaker and designer; son of painter Edward Bawden
- James Ravilious (born 1939), photographer; son of painters Eric Ravilious and Tirzah Garwood
- Professor Anthony D. Smith (1939 – 2016), historical sociologist; Professor Emeritus of Nationalism and Ethnicity at the London School of Economics

=== At Dane Court, Pyrford (post-war) ===
- Douglas Gresham (born 1945), actor, biographer, film producer, record producer; son of authors William Lindsay Gresham and Joy Davidman; stepson of C. S. Lewis
- Michael Wade OBE (born 1954), British insurance executive and political advisor
