= National Board of Review Awards 1993 =

Annual film awards

65th National Board of Review Awards

Best Picture:
Schindler's List

The 65th National Board of Review Awards, honoring the best in filmmaking in 1993, were announced on 14 December 1993 and given on 28 February 1994.

== Top 10 films ==
1. Schindler's List
2. The Age of Innocence
3. The Remains of the Day
4. The Piano
5. Shadowlands
6. In the Name of the Father
7. Philadelphia
8. Much Ado About Nothing
9. Short Cuts
10. The Joy Luck Club

== Top Foreign Films ==
1. Farewell My Concubine
2. El Mariachi
3. Un cœur en hiver
4. The Story of Qiu Ju
5. The Accompanist

== Winners ==
- Best Film:
  - Schindler's List
- Best Foreign Film:
  - Farewell My Concubine
- Best Actor:
  - Anthony Hopkins – The Remains of the Day, Shadowlands
- Best Actress:
  - Holly Hunter – The Piano
- Best Supporting Actor:
  - Leonardo DiCaprio – What's Eating Gilbert Grape
- Best Supporting Actress:
  - Winona Ryder – The Age of Innocence
- Best Director:
  - Martin Scorsese – The Age of Innocence
- Best Documentary:
  - The War Room
- Career Achievement Award:
  - Sean Connery
