= Douglas Gresham =

American-British actor, biographer and film producer (born 1945)

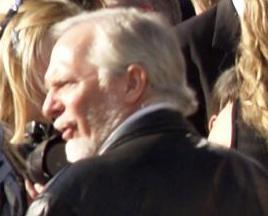
- Gresham in 2008
- Born: November 10, 1945 (age 80); New York City, U.S.
- Occupations: Actor, voice-over actor, biographer, film producer, executive record producer
- Spouse: Merrie Gresham
- Children: 5
- Parent(s): William Lindsay Gresham; Joy Davidman

Douglas Howard Gresham (born November 10, 1945) is a British farmer, media personality, film producer and executive record producer. He is one of the two stepsons of C. S. Lewis.

== Early life ==
Gresham was born in New York City, the son of writers William Lindsay Gresham and Joy Davidman. William Gresham was the author of Nightmare Alley, the classic of American noir literature, while Joy Davidman (of Jewish descent) was best known for her book Smoke on the Mountain, about the Ten Commandments. The couple separated in 1954, and Joy moved to England with her two sons, sending them to Dane Court preparatory school in Pyrford, Surrey.

Gresham's mother, Joy Davidman, had become friends with C. S. Lewis through correspondence, and the friendship blossomed, eventually leading to marriage in 1956. Davidman died of cancer in 1960, and Lewis continued to raise Douglas and his elder brother David. Lewis had adopted the boys when he married, and The Horse and His Boy is dedicated to them both. At Lewis's death in 1963, his estate went to his brother, Major Warren Hamilton Lewis. Ten years later, the Major passed the estate to Douglas and David.

Douglas Gresham is a Christian, as were Lewis and his mother Joy, while David returned to the Orthodox Judaism of their mother's ancestors while still a child in Lewis's home. Lewis made an effort to find kosher food for him.

== Career ==
Gresham hosted Focus on the Family Radio Theatre's adaptations of his stepfather's most famous works, and he was named co-producer for the series of theatrical films adaptations of The Chronicles of Narnia; he also appeared in a cameo role in the first installment as a radio newscaster, the second as a "Telmarine crier" and the third as a slaver.

Gresham came on as executive producer of recording artist Meg Sutherland's debut album in 2014, successfully signing her to Sprig Music in March with producer Christopher Hopper. He has responded to Sutherland's music by saying that it "sings from and about the heart. Sometimes it hurts. Sometimes it fills with joy. But then, beauty is like that."

Year	Title	Producer	Cameo	Notes
2005	The Chronicles of Narnia: The Lion, the Witch and the Wardrobe	Yes	Yes	Radio Announcer (voice)
2006	C.S. Lewis: Dreamer of Narnia	Yes	No	Documentary on the bonus disc
2008	The Chronicles of Narnia: Prince Caspian	Yes	Yes	Telmarine Crier
2010	The Chronicles of Narnia: The Voyage of the Dawn Treader	Yes	Yes	Slaver #1
2027	Narnia: The Magician's Nephew	Yes	No	Post-production

== Personal life ==
Gresham and his wife Merrie have five children, three boys and two girls. The youngest girl was adopted from an orphanage in Seoul, Korea. All of their biological children were born in Australia. The first three (the boys) were born in Tasmania where they owned and ran a dairy farm. The family left Tasmania in 1972 and lived for some time near Perth in Western Australia before returning to Tasmania in 1977 so that the children could grow up in the country on another farm in the north-east near Ringarooma. After the boys had left home, the couple and the two girls moved to Ireland and lived at Rathvinden House in Leighlinbridge, County Carlow, before moving to their house in Malta in 2008. In the late 2000s, Gresham and his family also acquired Little Green Island, a private island in Australia near Mackay, Queensland. The island was sold in 2024, as Gresham could "no longer travel internationally".

Gresham has written an autobiography, Lenten Lands, of his life to the age of 28 in 1973. A fictionalized young Douglas Gresham is a character in the 1993 film Shadowlands, in part derived from Lenten Lands. In the film, Gresham is played by the American actor Joseph Mazzello. There is no character derived from Douglas' brother David in the film or in the stage play on which the film was based, although both Douglas and David were portrayed in the original teleplay (1985) on which the stage play was based.

In November 2005, Gresham acknowledged in an interview on NPR that he and his brother David had been estranged, although in a subsequent interview he did say that they had been in email contact. After David's death, Gresham said that his brother had been diagnosed as a dangerous paranoid schizophrenic, and in their youth had often tried to harm him. David died in a hospital for patients with dementia in Switzerland on December 25, 2014.

== Bibliography ==
- Lenten Lands: My Childhood with Joy Davidman and C.S. Lewis, Macmillan (USA 1988) ISBN 0-02-545570-2
- Jack's Life: The Life Story of C.S. Lewis, Broadman and Holman (2005) ISBN 0-8054-3246-9
