= My Old Man (TV series) =

British TV sitcom (1974–1975)

- Genre: Sitcom
- Created by: Gerald Frow
- Written by: Gerald Frow
- Directed by: Paddy Russell
- Starring: Clive Dunn; Priscilla Morgan; Edward Hardwicke
- Theme music composer: Chris Sandford
- Country of origin: England
- Original language: English
- No. of series: 2
- No. of episodes: 13

Production
- Producers: John Duncan (series 1); Paddy Russell (series 2)
- Editor: Tudor Lloyd
- Camera setup: Charles B. Wilson
- Running time: 30 minutes
- Production company: Yorkshire Television

Original release
- Network: ITV
- Release: 3 May 1974 – 23 April 1975

Related
- Seven of One (1973)

My Old Man is a sitcom starring Clive Dunn as retired and embittered engine driver Sam Cobbett. ITV broadcast 13 episodes in two series during 1974 and 1975.

Set in London, Sam Cobbett is the last tenant to leave an old house on a council-condemned road. He goes to live with his daughter, her posh husband (Arthur), and their young teenage son (Ron), in a flat nearby.

== Cast ==
- Clive Dunn as Sam Cobbett
- Priscilla Morgan as Doris
- Edward Hardwicke as Arthur
- Keith Chegwin as Ron
- George Tovey as Willie
- Jon Laurimore as Andrew
- Peter Mayock as Cyril

== Production history ==
The pilot was one of a series of seven one-offs in a BBC Two comedy anthology series called Seven of One (1973). The pilot starred Ronnie Barker as Sam Cobbett, with Graham Armitage and Ann Beach as Arthur and Doris, and was produced by Sydney Lotterby and Harold Snoad.

When the BBC failed to develop Gerald Frow's script into a series, Yorkshire Television stepped in, took over and introduced an entirely new cast with Clive Dunn in the lead part, whilst Ronnie Barker focused on his successful roles in Porridge and Open All Hours on the BBC.

The location of the main series remained unchanged from the pilot.

== Series overview ==
Series	Episodes	Originally released		DVD release date (Region 2)
Series	Episodes	First released	Last released	DVD release date (Region 2)
1	7	3 May 1974	21 June 1974	2 August 2010
2	6	19 March 1975	23 April 1975	23 January 2012
