= Shadowlands (1985 film) =

1985 television film

- Genre: Biography; Romance; Drama
- Created by: Norman Stone
- Based on: C.S. Lewis; Joy Davidman
- Written by: William Nicholson
- Directed by: Norman Stone
- Starring: Joss Ackland; Claire Bloom; David Waller; Rupert Baderman; Rhys Hopkins
- Theme music composer: Ken Howard
- Country of origin: United Kingdom
- Original language: English

Production
- Executive producers: Richard Lewis; Daniel Wolf
- Producer: David M. Thompson
- Cinematography: Russ Walker
- Editor: Chris Lawrence
- Running time: 92 minutes
- Production company: British Broadcasting Corporation

Original release
- Network: BBC
- Release: 15 June 1985

Related
- Shadowlands (film); Shadowlands (play)

Shadowlands, also known as C.S. Lewis: Shadowlands and C.S. Lewis Through the Shadowlands, is a 1985 television film written by William Nicholson, directed by Norman Stone and produced by David M. Thompson for BBC Wales. The film is about the relationship between Oxford don and author C. S. Lewis and the American writer Joy Davidman. It stars Joss Ackland as Lewis, with Claire Bloom as his wife Joy Davidman.

== Synopsis ==
Oxford professor, world-renowned writer and confirmed bachelor C.S. Lewis (Joss Ackland) finds himself famed and admired from the success of his recently published series of Narnia books for children. One day, Lewis receives a captivating letter from an American woman, New York divorcée Joy Gresham (Claire Bloom). A mother of two boys, Gresham strikes up a correspondence with Lewis, who over time finds himself falling in love with the writer. Gresham moves to England with her two boys, Douglas and David (Rupert Baderman, Rhys Hopkins), and marries Lewis; who becomes their stepfather. All seems to be a perfect life and marriage for the happy family until Joy is suddenly struck down by cancer and dies. Devastated by this loss, Lewis struggles with his Christian beliefs and begins to challenge his own faith and relationship with God.

== Cast ==
- Joss Ackland as C. S. Lewis
- Claire Bloom as Joy Davidman Gresham
- David Waller as Warren "Warnie" Lewis
- Rupert Baderman as Douglas Gresham
- Rhys Hopkins as David Gresham

== History ==
Shadowlands began life as a script entitled I Call it Joy written for Thames Television by Brian Sibley and Norman Stone. Sibley was credited on the BBC film as "consultant" and went on to write the book C.S. Lewis Through the Shadowlands: The Story of His Life with Joy Davidman (1994). The made-for-television film won BAFTA Awards in 1986 for Best Play and Best Actress (Bloom). Following their roles in Shadowlands, Ackland and Bloom went on to star opposite each other in several other films: Queenie (1987), Mad Dogs and Englishmen (1995) and Tales from the Madhouse (2000).

The original 1985 film ran for ninety-two minutes. An alternate version, C.S. Lewis: Shadowlands, was produced in 1994 for home video; it ran for seventy-three minutes, cutting several scenes and including on-screen titles. A DVD version released in 2013, C.S. Lewis Through the Shadowlands, restored the original ninety-minute runtime.

Screenwriter William Nicholson adapted a stage version of the 1985 television movie, which premiered at the Theatre Royal in Plymouth on October 5, 1989. The production later went on to the Queen's Theatre in London before transferring to Broadway at the Brooks Atkinson Theatre on November 11, 1990, where it received a Tony Award at the 45th Tony Awards on June 2, 1991, for Best Actor (Nigel Hawthorne as Lewis).

The success of the stage play led Nicholson to adapt it once again as a feature film starring Anthony Hopkins and Debra Winger; it was released in 1993.

== See also ==
- Through the Shadowlands: The Love Story of C. S. Lewis and Joy Davidman by Brian Sibley, Revell (July 1, 2005) ISBN 978-0-800-73070-3
- A Grief Observed by C.S. Lewis, Bennett Books Ltd (1985) ISBN 978-0-802-72470-0
