= William Lindsay Gresham =

American writer (1909–1962)

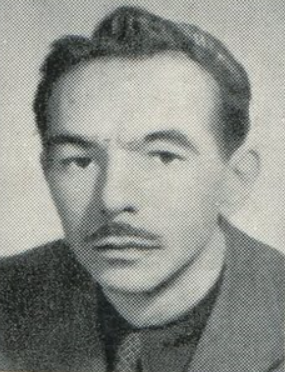
- Gresham c. 1949
- Born: August 20, 1909; Baltimore, Maryland, U.S.
- Died: September 14, 1962 (aged 53); New York City, New York, U.S.
- Cause of death: Suicide
- Occupation: Author
- Known for: Nightmare Alley
- Spouses: Joy Davidman (m. 1942; div. 1954) Renée Rodriguez (m. 1954)
- Children: 2; including Douglas Gresham

William Lindsay Gresham (/ˈɡrɛʃəm/; August 20, 1909 – September 14, 1962) was an American novelist and non-fiction author particularly well-regarded among readers of noir. His best-known work is Nightmare Alley (1946), which was adapted to film in 1947 and 2021.

== Life and career ==
Gresham was born in Baltimore, Maryland. As a child, he moved with his family to New York, where he became fascinated by the sideshow at Coney Island. Upon graduating from Erasmus Hall High School in Brooklyn in 1926, Gresham drifted from job to job, and worked as a folk singer in Greenwich Village.

His parents divorced when he was 16. His own first marriage also ended in divorce, as well as his second to a New Jersey socialite, which fell apart after nine years when he returned to the United States, embittered by his experiences in Spain. In 1937, Gresham had served as a volunteer medic for the Abraham Lincoln Brigade forces during the Spanish Civil War. There, he befriended a former sideshow employee, Joseph Daniel "Doc" Halliday, and their long conversations inspired much of his work, particularly Gresham's two books about the American carnival, the nonfiction Monster Midway and the fictional Nightmare Alley.

Returning to the United States in 1939, after a troubling period that involved a stay in a tuberculosis ward and a suicide attempt, Gresham found work editing true crime magazines. In 1942, Gresham married Joy Davidman, a poet, with whom he had two children, David (1944-2014) and Douglas.

In 1946 he published Nightmare Alley, his first and most successful novel. It was purchased by Hollywood for $60,000 and made into a film of the same name starring Tyrone Power in 1947. Gresham and Davidman moved into a sprawling fourteen-room house in Staatsburg, New York.

Gresham was an unfaithful and alcoholic husband. Davidman, an ethnically Jewish atheist, became a fan of the writings of C. S. Lewis, which led eventually to her conversion to Christianity. Within a year or so Gresham was calling himself a Christian, which influenced his second and last novel, Limbo Tower. However, the couple struggled financially, and Gresham would have tax problems for many years to come. Davidman complained to friends of his frequent drinking, serial infidelity, and even occasional eruptions of violence. At this time Gresham became interested in Dianetics, the 1950 self-help book by science fiction writer L. Ron Hubbard. Although an early enthusiast of Scientology, he later denounced it as another kind of spook racket.

Suffering from an illness, Davidman decided to go to England in 1952 to seek out C.S. Lewis, with whom she had been corresponding. She invited her cousin, Renée Rodriguez—who was fleeing an abusive husband with her two small children—to keep house for her family in her absence. Gresham and Rodriguez soon began an affair.

Gresham wrote to Davidman in January 1953 that he and Rodriguez had become lovers and Davidman returned to New York, enduring an awkward period during which all three of them were living under the same roof because none could afford to go anywhere else.

Davidman sold the house to pay off the Internal Revenue Service and moved to England with the boys. Later she married Lewis, their relationship forming the inspiration for the television film Shadowlands, later adapted for the stage and cinema.

Gresham married Rodriguez as soon as the divorce was finalized. After Davidman's untimely death, Gresham visited England to see his sons. When it became apparent that they were well cared for, he left them in the care of Lewis.

Gresham joined Alcoholics Anonymous and developed a deep interest in Spiritualism, having already exposed many of the fraudulent techniques of popular spiritualists in his two sideshow-themed books and having written a book about Houdini with the assistance of noted skeptic James Randi. Twenty-four of his articles and stories on fairgrounds, spook shows, and hucksters were republished in 2013 as Grindshow: the Selected Writings of William Lindsay Gresham.

== Death ==
In 1962, Gresham's health began to take a turn for the worse. He had started to go blind and was diagnosed with tongue cancer. On September 14, 1962 he checked into the Dixie Hotel, Manhattan under an alias, which he had often frequented while writing Nightmare Alley over a decade earlier. There, the 53-year-old Gresham took his life with an overdose of sleeping pills. His death went generally unnoticed by the New York press but for a mention by bridge columnist Albert Hodges Morehead. Business cards were found in his pocket, reading "No Address. No Phone. No Business. No Money. Retired."

== Works ==
- Nightmare Alley (1946); London : Raven Books, 2020, ISBN 978-1-5266-2849-7; aus dem Amerikanischen von Christian Veit Eschenfelder und Anja Heidböhmer, Leipzig : Festa, März 2022, ISBN 978-3-86552-713-4
- Limbo Tower (1949)
- Monster Midway: An Uninhibited Look at the Glittering World of the Carny (1954)
- Houdini: The Man Who Walked Through Walls (1959)
- The Book of Strength: Body Building the Safe, Correct Way (1961)
- Grindshow: The Selected Writings of William Lindsay Gresham, edited by Bret Wood (2013)
