= Nightmare Alley (novel) =

1946 novel by William Lindsay Gresham

- First edition cover
- Author: William Lindsay Gresham
- Language: English
- Publisher: Rinehart & Company
- Publication date: 1946
- Publication place: United States
- Media type: Print (hardback & paperback)

Nightmare Alley is a novel by American writer William Lindsay Gresham, published in 1946. It is a study of the depths of show business and its immoral inhabitants—the dark, shadowy world of a second-rate carnival filled with hustlers, scheming grifters, and Machiavellian femmes fatales.

Gresham attributed the origin of Nightmare Alley to conversations he had with a former carnival worker while they were both serving as volunteers with the Loyalist forces in the Spanish Civil War. Gresham wrote the novel, his first, while working as an editor for a "true crime", pulp magazine in New York City during the 1940s. He outlined the plot and wrote the first six chapters over a period of two years, then finished the book in four months. Each chapter is represented by a different Tarot card.

== Plot ==
Stanton Carlisle watches the geek show at a Ten-in-One where he has recently begun working. He later asks the carnival's talker Clem Hoately where geeks come from. Clem explains that geeks are "made": a sideshow owner finds an alcoholic bum and offers him a temporary job with a steady supply of liquor. Initially, the bum is only asked to pretend to be a geek, using a razor blade to slice chickens' necks and then faking the drinking of the blood. After a few weeks, the owner threatens to end the job and replace the bum with a "real" geek, and the fear of sobering up terrifies the bum into actually biting the chickens. Thus, a geek is made.

Stan performs sleight of hand tricks in the sideshow but studies under the carnival's mentalist Zeena to learn a refined "code" act, where performers memorize verbal cues that allow them to appear psychic by accurately answering written audience questions. Stan also begins to pick up Zeena's talent for cold reading. He eventually leaves the carnival with the beautiful and naïve electric girl Molly Cahill to perform a team code act.

Their act becomes very successful, but Stan grows bored and transforms himself into Reverend Carlisle, an upstanding spiritualist preacher offering séance sessions with the help of his medium. Stan gains a devoted following, but the stress of leading a false life leads him to seek the help of a psychologist named Lilith Ritter, who seduces and then begins controlling him. Stan pleads constantly for them to go away together, and Lilith eventually agrees, suggesting the Rev. Carlisle swindle a rich man for the getaway money. They settle on Ezra Grindle, a ruthless auto tycoon with a skeptical interest in the occult. Stan manages to convince Grindle of his powers, and the businessman becomes a devoted spiritualist.

Stan keeps Grindle hooked by promising to reunite him with his deceased college sweetheart Dorrie, who died in a botched back-alley abortion Grindle convinced her to seek. A reluctant Molly plays "Dorrie" in a series of sessions but eventually breaks character, destroying the illusion. In a rage Stan punches Molly and Grindle and flees the scene. At Lilith's suggestion he decides to go into hiding with Grindle's money but later discovers that Lilith has stolen a majority of it by replacing the five-hundred-dollar bills with singles. When he confronts her, she tells him that he is deluded and attempts to have him committed to a mental institution, and he narrowly escapes. He flees and resorts to performing as a mentalist at increasingly shoddy venues, trying to evade the men he falsely believes Grindle is sending after him. During this time, Molly takes up with a gambler reminiscent of her father, and gives birth to a son. Eventually Stan becomes a hobo, staying afloat by giving Tarot readings and selling horoscopes, but ends up murdering a police officer who attacks him while he sells his merchandise. A final reconnection with Zeena provides him an opportunity to again make a living in the carnival, but he breaks completely and descends into alcoholism and depression when he discovers through a newspaper article that Lilith has wed Grindle.

His life in shambles, a drunk Stan finds a carnival owner and asks to join the sideshow as a palm reader. The owner gives Stan some whiskey but refuses his proposal, saying the show is full. But as Stan begins to stumble out, the owner changes his tune and invites Stan back in with a job offer: "Of course, it's only temporary – just until we get a real geek."

== Reception ==
In a 2010 review, American critic Michael Dirda proclaimed, "I was utterly unprepared for its raw, Dostoevskian power... It's not often that a novel leaves a weathered and jaded reviewer like myself utterly flattened, but this one did....it's more than just a steamy noir classic. As a portrait of the human condition, Nightmare Alley is a creepy, all-too-harrowing masterpiece."

Author and creative writing professor Dwight V. Swain described the conclusion of Nightmare Alley as an exemplar of a novel with an unhappy ending that was nonetheless a "fitting ending," where the protagonist brought misfortune on himself.

== Editions ==
- Nightmare Alley. Garden City: Sun Dial Press, 1948.
- (reprinted in) Crime Novels: American Noir of the 1930s and 40s, Robert Polito, ed. (Library of America, 1997) ISBN 978-1-883011-46-8
- 2010 reprint by New York Review Books ISBN 978-1-59017-348-0
- 2013 reprint with four Gresham essays on fortune-telling and freak shows, by Centipede Press, Bret Wood, ed. ISBN 978-1-61347-006-0

== Adaptations ==
- A film adaptation of the same name - as a film noir starring Tyrone Power as Stanton Carlisle - was released in 1947.
- A graphic novel adaptation of the novel was produced in 2003 by underground cartoonist Spain Rodriguez.
- A musical by Jonathan Brielle, directed by Gil Cates. It opened on April 21, 2010 at the Geffen Playhouse in Los Angeles.
- A film adaptation of the same name - as a neo-noir psychological thriller starring Bradley Cooper as Stanton Carlisle - was released in 2021.
