= Michael Wade (businessman) =

British businessman and political advisor

Michael John Wade OBE
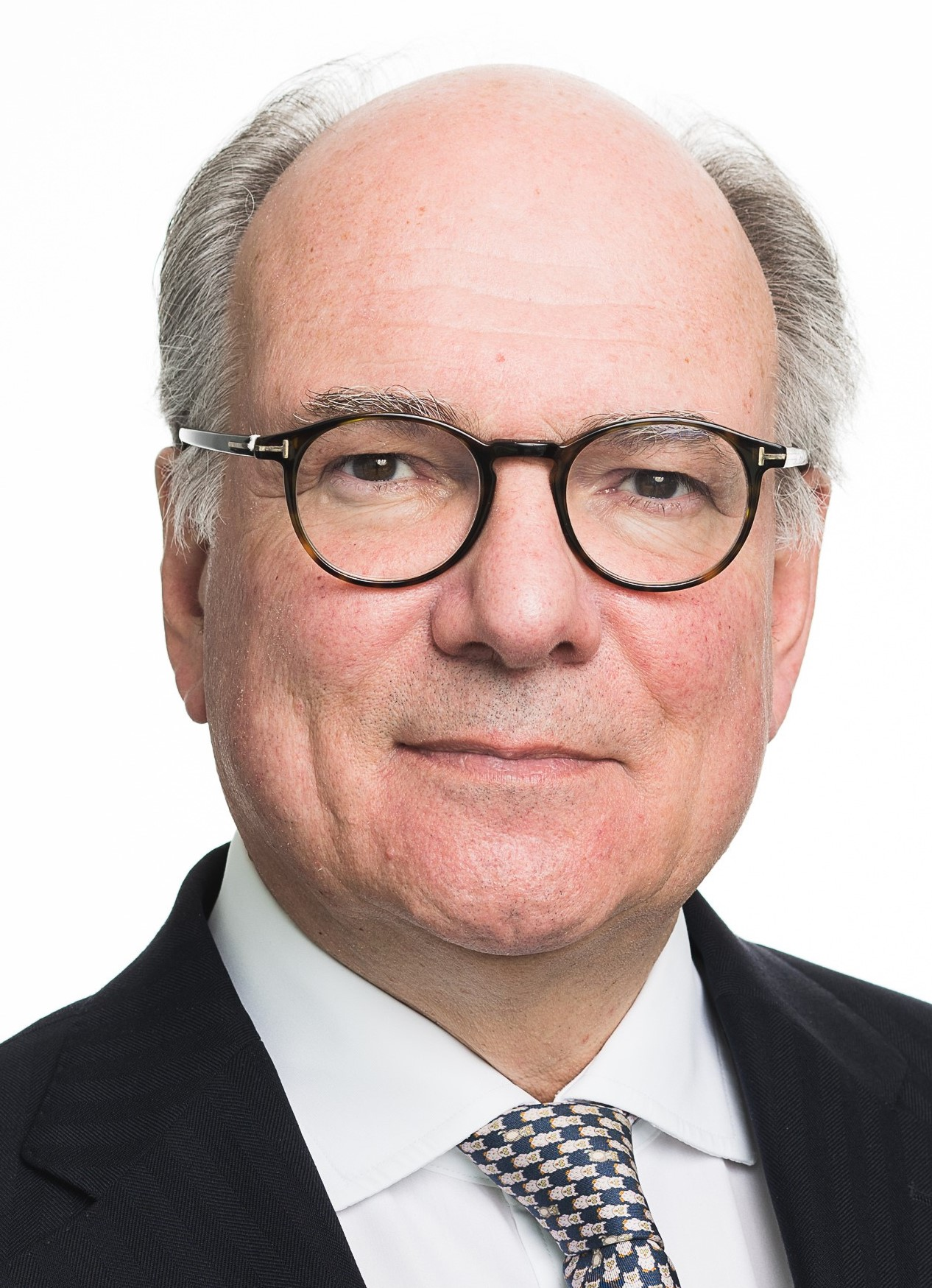
- Official portrait, 2019
- Born: Michael John Wade; 22 May 1954 (age 72); Woking, Surrey, United Kingdom
- Occupations: Political advisor; insurance executive
- Spouse: Caroline Dashwood (m. 1997; div. 2001)
- Children: 1
- Website: www.michaelwade.org

Michael John Wade OBE (born 22 May 1954) is a British insurance executive and political advisor.

== Early life ==
Michael Wade was born in Woking, Surrey, United Kingdom. He is of Parsi Zoroastrian descent; his ancestors formed the Bombay Dockyards for the British East India Company – known as the Wadia family. Wade is a descendant of Ardaseer Wadia, who settled in London during 1839, and became a member of the Royal Society.

Wade attended the Dane Court Preparatory School in Pyrford, Surrey, before boarding at the Royal Russell School in Addington, Surrey.

== Career ==
Wade began his career in 1975 at C E Health Underwriting before going to set up Holman Wade Ltd with John Holman & Sons in 1980 at the age of 26 specialising in reinsurance for Members of Lloyd's. The business later merged with H. Clarkson & Co ship-broking group and in 1986 became known as Horace Clarkson, later Clarksons, before listing on the London Stock Exchange. Wade remained a director of the company until 1993 when he left to form Corporate Lloyd's Membership (CLM) with former chairman of British Rail, Sir Peter Parker and Jim Payne, a vice chairman of Sedgwick Group. In 1999, CLM merged with SVB Holdings plc. Wade was appointed Deputy Chairman of the combined group, which was an Integrated Lloyd's Vehicles listed on the London Stock Exchange, but stepped down in January 2000 to form investment manager Rostrum Group Ltd. As CEO, Wade oversaw investments in Lloyd’s listed vehicles and pension fund portfolios.

Prior to this, Wade was Chairman of Optex Group Ltd from 2006 to 2012. When it was sold to Besso, Wade was appointed Executive Chairman of Besso Insurance Group Ltd in 2011 where he worked with restructuring equity shareholdings, reducing bank debt and returning the business to profitability. He left the business 2012.

Wade has worked in the Lloyd's insurance market since the 1970's, serving in executive, advisory and non-executive roles. Wade served on the Council of Lloyd's, the Committee of Lloyd's and the Parliamentary Liaison Committee. He was also involved in establishing the Lloyd's Taskforce chaired by Sir David Rowland. He has held advisory and board roles in several insurance firms, including Mitsui Sumitomo Insurance in Tokyo and Helios Underwriting Plc a listed Lloyd’s vehicle. Wade holds a chairmanship of TigerRisk Capital Markets & Advisory (UK) now a part of Howden Insurance Group renamed Howden Tiger. as well as previous appointments at Brit Insurance, Neon Underwriting (at Lloyd's), and Swiss Re.

== Political History ==
In 2000, he became a treasurer of the Conservative Party, a role he held until 2010.

In May 2012, Wade was a co-founder of the Conservative Friends of Pakistan. He was also Chairman of the group from 2012 to 2015.

Wade was appointed by Robert Jenrick in July 2020 as a senior advisor on the financing of building safety remediation for domestic tower blocks in the UK.

Wade was previously appointed a Crown Representative by Minister for the Cabinet Office Francis Maude in April 2013. He held this role until 2015 when he became a senior advisor to the Cabinet Office. During this time, Wade was involved in the development of Flood Re.

== Honours ==
Wade was awarded an OBE in the Queen's 2018 Birthday Honours for services to Government and the Economy.

== Personal life ==
Michael Wade married Caroline Dashwood, daughter of Sir Francis Dashwood, in 1997 at the Dashwood family estate, West Wycombe Park.

Wade bought Trafalgar Park, a Grade I listed country house near Salisbury, Wiltshire, in 1995. During 2021, Wade listed a restored Trafalgar Park for sale and was sold by October 2021.
