= Barker (occupation) =

Person attempting to attract patrons to events

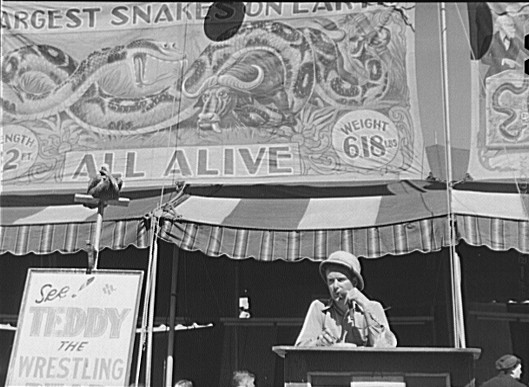
Barker at the Vermont State Fair, 1941

A barker, often a carnival barker, is a person who attempts to attract patrons to entertainment events, such as a circus or funfair, by exhorting passing members of the public, announcing attractions of the show, and emphasizing variety, novelty, beauty, or some other enticing feature of the show. A barker would often conduct a brief free show, introducing performers and describing acts to be given at the feature performance. Professional barkers strongly disliked the term and generally refer to themselves and each other as "talkers".

Perhaps the most famous fictional barkers are Billy Bigelow, the protagonist of Rodgers and Hammerstein's classic stage musical Carousel, and Tin Man, a supporting protagonist from the 1978 musical film The Wiz portrayed by Nipsey Russell. Bigelow, in turn was an Americanized version of Liliom, the protagonist of Hungarian author Ferenc Molnár's non-musical play Liliom, on which Carousel is based. The term barker has been adapted in modern times to describe political propagandists.

== See also ==
- The Barker
- Barker channel
- Barking
- Tout
- Spruiker
- Ringmaster
