= Vin Burnham =

British costume designer

- Occupation: Costume designer
- Notable credits: The Dark Crystal (1982); Batman (1989); Captain America (1990); Teenage Mutant Ninja Turtles II: The Secret of the Ooze (1991); Batman Returns (1992); The Fifth Element (1997); Boohbah (2003); The Wind in the Willows (2006); The Monster Ball Tour (2009)

Vinilla "Vin" Burnham is a British costume designer whose work has appeared in film, television, theatre and commercials. She is best known for creating the Batsuit for Tim Burton's Batman films, the lion Aslan for the BBC's The Lion, the Witch and the Wardrobe, and Lady Gaga's Living Dress.

Burnham began her career in the 1970s as a costume and prop maker in theatre, before costume designer James Acheson brought her in to make costumes for the film Time Bandits (1981). Following several projects with Jim Henson's Creature Shop, Burnham sculpted costumes for Tim Burton's Batman films and created creature effects for a series of science fiction films. In the late 1990s, Burnham moved into costume design for film and TV. Her creature designs were seen in the BBC children's series the Boohbah and In the Night Garden.... Bunham also designed costumes for commercials, and received the British Advertising Craft Award in 2003.

== Early training and career ==
Vin Burnham comes from a theatrical family. Her parents, Edward Burnham and Lucille Steven, were both actors, her sister Lal d'Abo is also a costume maker, and her brother Tim worked in theatre as a lighting designer (and now runs Tempest Lighting in Los Angeles). Burnham started her costume career with a summer job as a trainee in the props department at the Royal Opera House in London, and stayed for two years learning from prop-makers and costume designers. Several years later, Burnham returned to ROH as a freelancer to make headdresses for Swan Lake (designed by Yolanda Sonnebend), mice and King Rat for The Nutcracker (1984, designed by Julia Trevelyan Oman), and headdresses for the ballet Gloria (1980, designed by Andy Klunder), which are now in the V&A Museum, London. In the early 1980s, Burnham was recruited by costume designer James Acheson to create creature costumes and effects for Time Bandits, Monty Python's The Meaning of Life (1983), and Brazil (1985).

== Creature creations ==
Alongside her work with Acheson, Burnham worked with Jim Henson's Creature Shop. The company (then known as the Jim Henson Organization) had a London workshop with a state-of-the-art foam lab and animatronics team, based in Hampstead. Burnham's first film project with the Creature Shop was The Dark Crystal (1982). Burnham was on the Skeksis unit, created the theatrical garments worn by the evil characters. The design of the characters was set by Brian Froud's illustrations, and Burnham and team had to translate those drawings into three-dimensional, practical costumes for the enormous puppet characters. Burnham returned to the Creature Shop for Henson's next major film project, Labyrinth, contributing to costumes including the Riding Goblins and the cloak for Jareth.

This experience working with animatronic creatures led to Burnham's commission to design Aslan, the lion hero of The Chronicles of Narnia, for the BBC's three-part adaptation first broadcast in 1988. The costume started with life casts of the two performers (Ailsa Berk and William Todd Jones) who would be inside the lion, performing the body and operating the mechanical elements. A weight-bearing lion's skeleton structure for Aslan's body made from nylon and aluminium rod and sheet was supported on backpacks, and covered with a foam musculature. Burnham collaborated with creature designer Niki Lyons to develop this strong but lightweight body. Burnham, Lyons and Alli Eynon sculpted the head in clay, with consideration for the animatronics that would animate the eyes, jaw and snarl based onto Aslan's 'skull' by animatronics designer Tim Rose. The fur covering was a combination of flocking for his face, knotted yak hair and pig's bristles (used for making paint brushes).

== Superhero and science fiction era ==
In film fandom, Vin Burnham is best known as the maker of the Batsuit for the Tim Burton Batman films, and film journalists have claimed that, "Vin created a costume that would define the character on the silver screen for two decades and beyond". Costume designer Bob Ringwood recruited Burnham to sculpt and construct the new batsuit for the 1989 film Batman. This "dark revisionist" version of the comic book character required a darker, more Gothic style suit that could, in Ringwood's words, "make somebody who was average sized and ordinary-looking into this bigger-than-life creature". The moulded latex suit, which was sculpted by Burnham and Alli Eynon using modelling clay, had exaggerated musculature and a heavy cowl. The costume was credited with creating a dark, moody character and "stoic movement" for the re-imagined Batman.

Following the success of the suit in Batman, Burnham made the suit for Matt Salinger as the title character of Captain America (1990). Burnham's work with Henson's continued; she led the character costume design with sculptor Ray Scott for Shredder in Teenage Mutant Ninja Turtles II: The Secret of the Ooze (1991). For Batman Returns (1992), Burnham re-visited and refined the original Batsuit design, and addressed issues with durability and flexibility on the previous film. She led the "Bat Shop" team, based in Burbank, California, to create a new body and digital head cast of Batman actor Michael Keaton. Sculptors Jose Fernandez, Steve Wang and Alli Eynon created a clay version of the suit, which was then cast in foam latex. For Catwoman, played by Michelle Pfeiffer, Burnham had a black catsuit base made in latex by Andy Wilkes of Syren clothing in Los Angeles with prosthetic latex stitching glued on. The costume team provided sixty-three duplicates to supply the stunt doubles and repeats for Pfeiffer for the duration of filming.

Burnham subsequently created costume effects for The Fifth Element (1997), a science fiction film directed by Luc Besson, with costumes designed by John Paul Gaultier. On the film Lost in Space (1998), Burnham was costume designer for the parts of the film set in space. This included illuminated, sculpted space suits called cryo-suits, "which served not only as clothing but as life-support" for the characters in the film. Burnham employed the sculpting and moulding process she had used in previous projects, and brought in FBFX Ltd and Colin Campbell to install blue LED and fibre-optic lights through the suits. Burnham explained "we were trying to tie the costumes in with the Jupiter 2 [spaceship], so they had a machinelike quality". Costume suppliers also included the Ministry of Defence, who manufactured fabric spacesuits for the cast based on the Air Force G-suit.

== Children's television ==
In the 2000s, Vin Burnham designed costumes for a series of British children's television shows that included realistic and fantasy creatures. The design of Boohbah (2003), the brainchild of Teletubbies co-creator Anne Wood, was inspired by cellular structures and microscopic creatures, and Burnham brought these references into the atomic appearance of the characters. It was an exercise-based show, with human performers inside costumes that span, grew and shrank, and retracted – and they were intentionally "ridiculous and silly" to keep child viewers entertained. In 2006, Burnham was costume designer for the BBC adaptation of The Wind in the Willows, starring Bob Hoskins and Mark Gatiss. Burnham's designs took inspiration from the "idyllic" landscapes of Ashdown Forest, as well as the drawings of Arthur Rackham. The large scale production required more than 130 costumes, including 14 for Toad, played by Matt Lucas. For her work on The Wind in the Willows, Burnham was nominated for the Royal Television Society Award for Best Costume Design - Drama.

In The Night Garden... (2007–09) was a dreamworld of characters created by Andrew Davenport and Anne Wood, created using physical sets and actors, and complex special effects. Burnham acted as costume consultant to Davenport, and worked with her frequent collaborators Day Murch, Tim Rose and Tahra Zafar to turn character drawings into real costumes. They incorporated animatronics and lighting technology, mounted on harnesses and backpacks. The costume for Upsy Daisy was approximately seven feet tall, and included hydraulics to move the skirt and a screen to aid visibility. Burnham created animal-based costumes for the CBeebies show ZingZillas (2010–12), which was set on a tropical island, featuring a band of musical monkeys. The "breakfast-time hit" explored different musical genres, and featured special musical guests. During this period, Burnham also worked on television commercials, most notably designing the costumes for McVitie's Penguin biscuits, for which she won the 2003 British Advertising Craft Award for Best Costume.

== Other works ==
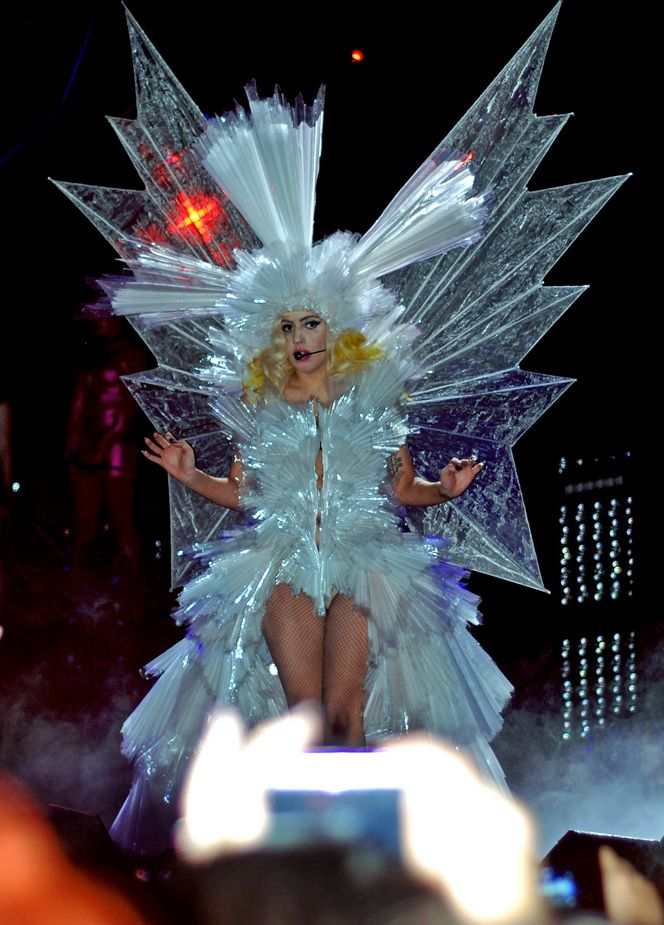
Lady Gaga wearing 'the living dress' on The Monster Ball Tour (2010)

In 2008, Vin Burnham re-united with costume designer James Acheson and Monty Python member Terry Jones to design costumes for the opera adaptation of his libretto Evil Machines. Burnham designed household objects, such as parking meters, tumble driers and vacuum cleaners, as wearable costumes that weighed less than 7 kg each and left the singers' chests unimpeded. Two years later, Vin Burnham was commissioned, via Jim Henson's Creature Shop and the Haus of Gaga, to design and construct the 'Living Dress', a robotic costume for Lady Gaga's The Monster Ball Tour. Burnham took inspiration from dance costume and haute couture, including Hussain Chalayan's robotic gowns as exemplified in his 2007 collection 'One Hundred and Eleven' (Burnham collaborated with Chalayan's animatronics expert Adam Wright on the project). The realised costume was made of hundreds of acetate fans, mounted on a fitted corset and Victorian bustle to support the animatronics and a mechanism designed by Adam Wright to animate the wings, that could open and close to resemble a firefly. Performance theorists have highlighted Burnham's design and Gaga's performance of the Living Dress as an innovative use of technology and a notable example of "serious play" in twenty-first century re-imaginings of camp.

== Publications ==
- Best Ever Kids' Costumes. London: HarperCollins, 2009. ISBN 978-1-84340-475-0
- Get Into Costume: Design, Make and Manage for the Stage and Screen (Creative Careers). London: Bloomsbury, 2026. ISBN 978-1-350-30105-4
