= Prince Caspian and The Voyage of the Dawn Treader (1989 serial) =

1989 British children's television series

- Written by: C.S. Lewis; Alan Seymour
- Directed by: Alex Kirby
- Starring: Richard Dempsey; Sophie Cook; Jonathan R. Scott; Sophie Wilcox; David Thwaites
- Composer: Geoffrey Burgon
- Country of origin: United Kingdom
- No. of series: 1
- No. of episodes: 6

Production
- Producer: Paul Stone
- Production locations: Tresco, Isles of Scilly; Plas Newydd, Llangollen
- Running time: 27-28 min. per episode (approx.)

Original release
- Network: BBC
- Release: 19 November – 24 December 1989

Related
- The Lion, the Witch and the Wardrobe; The Silver Chair; The Chronicles of Narnia

Prince Caspian and The Voyage of the Dawn Treader is the second series of The Chronicles of Narnia that ran from 1988 to 1990. The series, which was shown on BBC television in 1989, is an adaptation of two of C. S. Lewis's The Chronicles of Narnia novels: Prince Caspian (1951) and The Voyage of the Dawn Treader (1952).

== Cast ==
- Richard Dempsey as Peter Pevensie
- Sophie Cook as Susan Pevensie
- Jonathan R. Scott as Edmund Pevensie
- Sophie Wilcox as Lucy Pevensie
- Jean Marc Perret as Prince Caspian
- Robert Lang as King Miraz
- Angela Barlow as Queen Prunaprismia
- Henry Woolf as Dr. Cornelius
- Julie Peters (puppet performance) and Joanna David (voice) as Trufflehunter
- George Claydon as Nikabrik
- Big Mick as Trumpkin
- William Todd-Jones as Glenstorm
- Warwick Davis as Reepicheep
- Ailsa Berk, William Todd-Jones and Tim Rose (puppet performance) and Ronald Pickup (voice) as Aslan
- Joe McGann as Lord Glozelle
- Rory Edwards as Lord Sopespian
- Barbara Kellerman as Old Hag
- Martin Stone as Wolfman
- David Thwaites as Eustace Scrubb
- Samuel West as King Caspian
- John Hallam as Captain Drinian
- Guy Fithen as Rhince
- Neale S. McGrath as Rynelf
- Marcus Eyre as Pug
- Roger McKern as Tacks
- Pavel Douglas as Lord Bern
- Jared Morgan as Gatekeeper
- John Quarmby as Gumpas
- Ailsa Berk as Dragon
- Jack Purvis and Kenny Baker as Dufflepuds
- Preston Lockwood as Coriakin
- Christopher Godwin as Lord Rhoop
- Gabrielle Anwar as Princess
- Geoffrey Bayldon as Ramandu

== Production ==
Scenes for Prince Caspian were filmed at Arley railway station, Hawkstone Park and Pembroke Castle.

The parts of the series used in The Voyage of the Dawn Treader were filmed in Wales throughout summer 1989. The majority of the four Dawn Treader episodes were shot on location in Milford Haven, including scenes filmed aboard the Dawn Treader and for scenes set on Dragon Island. The cast and crew travelled to Tresco, Isles of Scilly for scenes taking place on fictional Doorn Island. Tresco Abbey Gardens and Plas Newydd stood in for Narrowhaven and Dufflepud Island respectively. The rest of the series was shot in Ealing Studios, including some scenes taking place on the deck of the Dawn Treader.

Warwick Davis portrayed the martial mouse Reepicheep in the production and would later go on to play the character of Nikabrik in the 2008 film Prince Caspian. According to Samuel West who played King Caspian, he stole one of Warwick Davis' latex prop noses and kept it after production ended. Despite having naturally curly hair, West also wore a wig during production.

== Episodes ==
=== Prince Caspian ===
No.	Original release date
1	19 November 1989
The four Pevensie children are waiting at a train station when a magical force pulls them into Narnia. They land at an overgrown castle which they recognise as Cair Paravel, and recover the gifts which they had received on their first adventure in Narnia. Susan saves the life of a dwarf called Trumpkin who is about to be drowned by two human soldiers on a boat. The children tell him that they are the old Kings and Queens of Narnia, of which Trumpkin has heard in the Narnian legends. Trumpkin tells the children the story of Prince Caspian, nephew of the current monarch, King Miraz. Caspian lived in a great castle with his uncle King Miraz and Miraz's wife Queen Prunaprismia. He has a tutor called Dr. Cornelius who one night woke him up because the Queen had given birth to a baby; with a direct heir, Miraz no longer needs Caspian, and planned to kill him. Caspian escaped on a horse but fell from it in the woods and was taken in by Trumpkin, a badger called Trufflehunter and a black dwarf called Nikabrik. These are people who live in hiding, because King Miraz hates the Old Narnians; his ancestors defeated them in their invasion of Narnia hundreds of years earlier, and he believes (or at least seems to hope) that they are no longer living. The children travel through the woods with Trumpkin to join Caspian, narrowly escaping from Miraz’s army as they near the Stone Table.
2	26 November 1989
That night, Lucy wakes up from sleep, hearing someone calling her name. She realises that it is Aslan, who instructs the others to follow him. The children meet Aslan the next morning at the Stone Table (or Aslan’s How, as it is now known following the creation of a mound concealing the table), and he takes them to meet the Old Narnians and Prince Caspian. Nikabrik has enlisted the help of a Hag and a Werewolf, intending to resurrect the White Witch so she can kill Miraz. Caspian, Cornelius and Trufflehunter object, and a fight breaks out. Peter, Edmund, Caspian and Trumpkin then intervene. Nikabrik, the Hag, and the Werewolf are killed, but Caspian is wounded. Peter sends a letter of challenge to King Miraz and the guard who gave it to him is Glozelle, one of the King's courtiers who along with Sopespian has been conspiring against the King. Miraz then has an argument with his two courtiers, initially intending to refuse the challenge, but Glozelle and Sopespian trick him into accepting the offer. Peter fights Miraz and in the struggle he stabs him. Miraz lies wounded on the floor and Glozelle finishes him off by stabbing him in the back with a knife. A battle is fought briefly, during which Peter kills Glozelle. A brave mouse called Reepicheep has his tail cut off but Aslan restores it in recognition of his bravery. Aslan also names Caspian as the King of Narnia, and peace is restored between all Narnians. The four Pevensies return home, with Aslan telling them that Peter and Susan will not return, but Edmund and Lucy will. When they return from Narnia, it is explained that Peter has gone back to school, Susan has been invited to America for a holiday, and the younger two, Edmund and Lucy, are going to be staying at their cousin Eustace Scrubb's home - which they are not looking forward to. Sitting in their temporary room, they both comment on a picture on the wall, how it resembles a Narnian ship. Eustace enters the room, and all three are sucked into the painting.

=== The Voyage of the Dawn Treader ===
No.	Original release date
1	3 December 1989
On board the ship the Dawn Treader, Edmund and Lucy are reunited with Caspian who has grown into a young man since they last saw him. He explains that he is on a quest to find seven lords who were friends of his late father, having been banished from Narnia by the wicked King Miraz. The quest requires them to sail through dangerous waters, encountering new islands where things are not what they seem and finally to sail to the end of the world, hoping to reach Aslan's Land. The first island they encounter is one of the Lone Islands, where they are captured by slave traders, but are rescued the next day when Caspian and his army arrive at the market (having already deposed Governor Gumpus) and announce the abolition of slavery in Narnia. Caspian had already been bought by a man who introduced himself as Lord Bern (one of the missing lords).
2	10 December 1989
They later find an isolated island which appears to be uninhabited. Eustace wanders off and finds a cave where a dragon has died. The cave is full of gold and jewellery, and Eustace finds a bracelet which he puts on. He is tired and soon falls asleep, but when he wakes up he soon realises that he has been transformed into a dragon. He flies back to the beach where the others confront him, and they soon figure out who he is. He is soon turned back into a human by Aslan. Caspian establishes that the bracelet was a possession of Lord Octesian, who must have perished on that island.
3	17 December 1989
The third island (Caspian declares it "Goldwater Island," but Reepicheep proposes the more apt name of "Deathwater Island") where they find a cavern in which there is a pool. Edmund places his sword in the water to measure its depth, only for it to become heavy and fall in the water – causing it to splash over his shoes and produce splashes of gold. There is a body in the water, and they establish that anyone or anything that ends up in the water turns into gold. Caspian later realises that the body in the water is that of Lord Restimar. On the fourth island, they encounter some invisible creatures who give them dinner at a large house. A magician called Coriakin appears after Lucy reads from a magic book, and the creatures are soon made visible again.
4	24 December 1989
The fifth and final island is at the end of the world. Before they ascend the island, they find a man in the water who introduced himself as Lord Rhoop. On the island they meet Ramandu and his daughter, and also find the three remaining Lords who are in an enchanted sleep. The three children eventually return home, and before leaving they know that Caspian will marry the daughter of Ramandu, who lives on an island at the end of the world, and that the four lords who were in a deep sleep on Ramandu's island will awaken. Aslan also told Edmund and Lucy that they will not return to Narnia since they are getting too old. However, Eustace is not told the same, and retains the hope that he might one day return to Narnia.

== Awards ==
=== 1990 ===
- BAFTA for Best Children's Programme (Entertainment/Drama) - Nominated
- BAFTA for Best Make Up - Nominated
- BAFTA for Best Design - Nominated
- BAFTA for Best Costume Design - Nominated
- BAFTA for Best Video Lighting - Nominated
- BAFTA for Best Video Cameraman - Nominated
