= Norman Garwood =

English production designer (1946–2019)

- Born: Norman Garwood; 8 January 1946; Birmingham, England
- Died: 13 April 2019 (aged 73)
- Occupation: Production designer
- Years active: 1965–2019

Norman Garwood (8 January 1946 – 13 April 2019) was an English art director, and production designer. Garwood was nominated for three Academy Awards for "Best Art Direction" for the films Brazil (1985) by Terry Gilliam; Glory (1989) by Edward Zwick; and Hook (1991) by Steven Spielberg. In 1985, he won a BAFTA Award for Best Production Design and an Evening Standard British Film Award for his work on the film Brazil (1985). He was known for his use of elaborate design in film.

== Filmography ==
- Time Bandits (1981), as art director
- The Missionary (1982)
- Bullshot (1983)
- Brazil (1985)
- Water (1985)
- Link (1986)
- The Princess Bride (1987)
- Glory (1989)
- Hook (1991)
- Lost in Space (1998)
- Rollerball (2002)

== Accolades ==
Award	Category	Nominee(s)	Result
Academy Awards	Best Art Direction	Brazil (1985)	Nominated
Academy Awards	Best Art Direction	Glory (1990)	Nominated
Academy Awards	Best Art Direction	Hook (1991)	Nominated
BAFTA Award	Best Production Design	Brazil (1985)	Won
Evening Standard British Film Award	Best Production Design	Brazil (1985)	Won
