= Tim Rose (actor) =

American actor and puppeteer (born 1956)

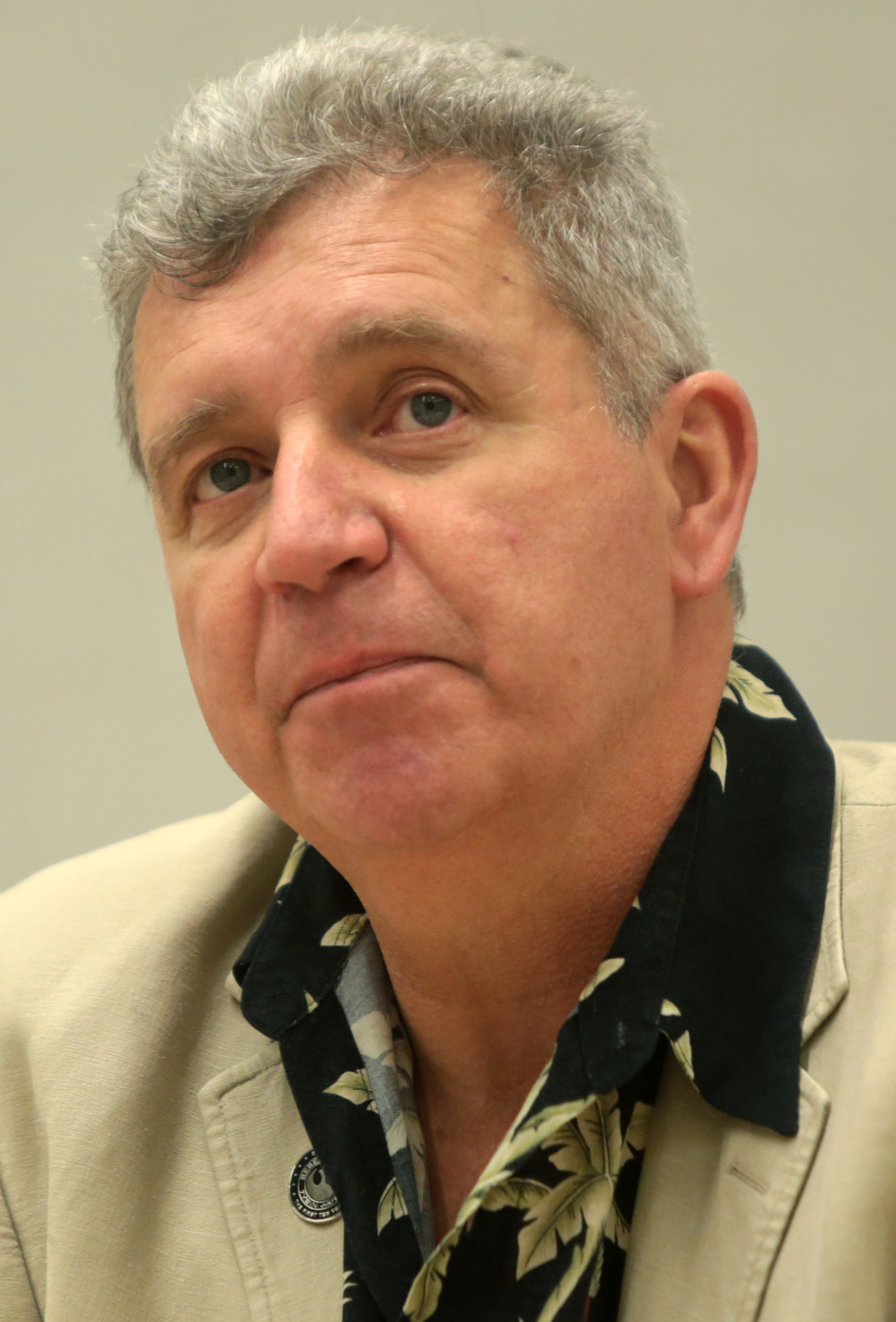
- Rose at Phoenix Fan Fest in 2016
- Born: July 17, 1956 (age 70); Pittsfield, Illinois, U.S.
- Occupations: Actor, puppeteer
- Years active: 1977–present
- Website: www.admiralackbar.co.uk/home.php

Timothy D. Rose (born July 17, 1956) is an American actor and puppeteer, best known for playing Admiral Ackbar in the Star Wars series. In addition, he puppeteered for Salacious B. Crumb, the court jester of Jabba the Hutt, in Star Wars: Episode VI – Return of the Jedi.

== Early life ==
Rose was born in Pittsfield, Illinois, on July 17, 1956. He received his degree from SUNY Albany.

== Career ==
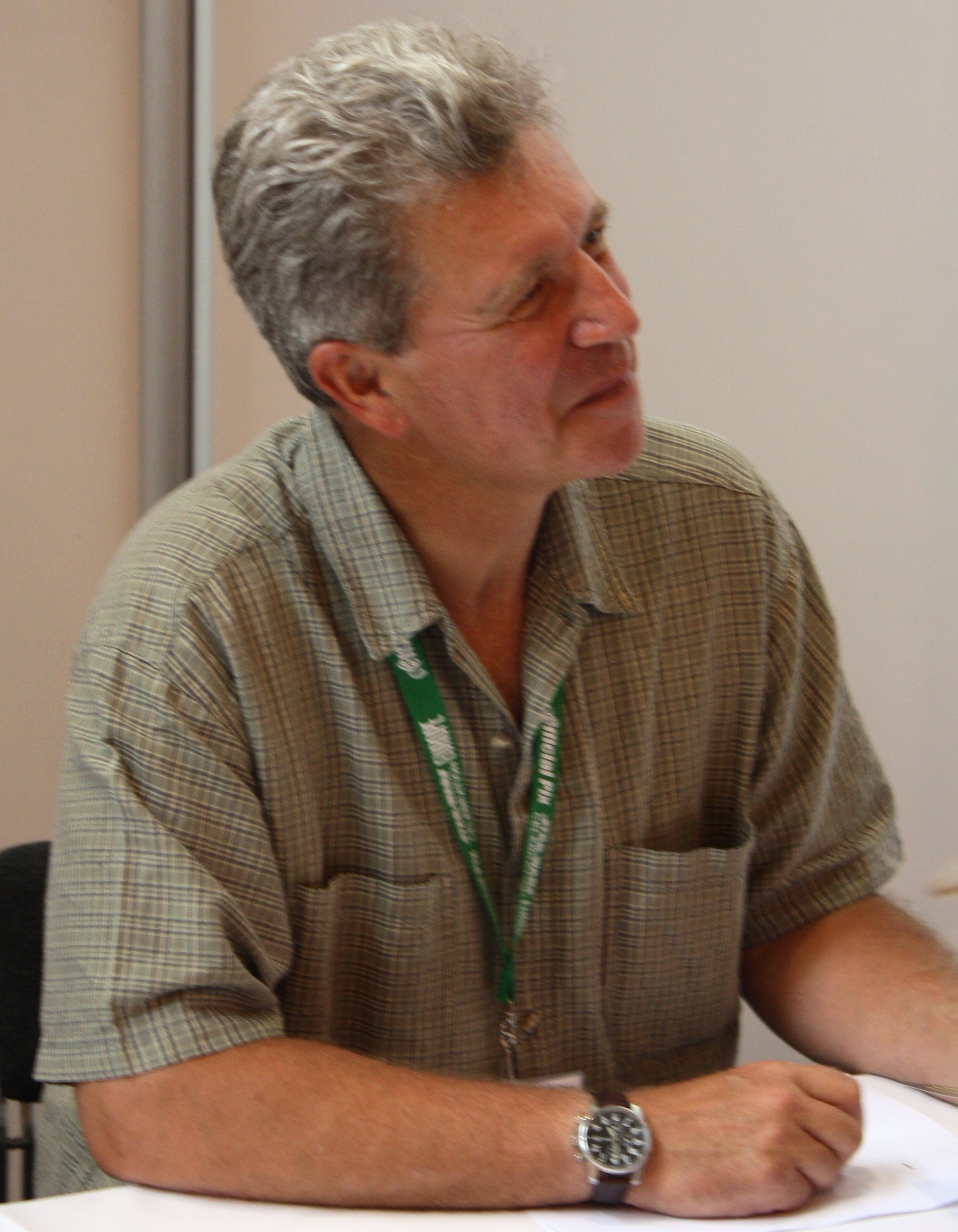
Rose at Star Wars Celebration Europe II in Essen, Germany

Rose is best known for playing the role of Admiral Ackbar in the third Star Wars film, Return of the Jedi, a role which he played again in Star Wars: The Force Awakens and Star Wars: The Last Jedi. In addition, Rose also puppeteered the characters of Sy Snootles and Salacious Crumb in Return of the Jedi, and has been involved with other Lucasfilm and The Jim Henson Company projects, including The Dark Crystal and Howard the Duck.

He also helped in puppeteering the character of Tik-Tok in Walt Disney Pictures' Return to Oz.

Rose also made the puppets Cosmo and Dibs for the BBC children's series You and Me. They debuted on that show in 1983. He also did assistant puppetry for Barnaby Bear on Becky and Barnaby Bear.

In 1988, Rose collaborated with creature designer/maker Vin Burnham on the lion Aslan for the BBC's The Lion, the Witch and the Wardrobe. Rose sculpted the skull and installed the animatronics for the animal's head and operated it during filming.

== Filmography ==
=== Film ===
Year	Title	Role	Notes
1982	The Dark Crystal	Treasurer	Performer
1982	Return of the Ewok	Salacious Crumb (voice)	
1983	Return of the Jedi	Admiral Ackbar, Salacious Crumb, Sy Snootles	Voiced by Erik Bauersfeld as Admiral Ackbar; Credited as Tim Rose
1985	Return to Oz	Tik-Tok	Head operator
1986	Howard the Duck	Howard T. Duck	Head operator
1992	The Muppet Christmas Carol	Additional Muppet performer (voice)	
2008	8th Wonderland	Richards	
2015	Star Wars: The Force Awakens	Admiral Ackbar	Voiced by Erik Bauersfeld; Credited as Tim Rose
2017	Star Wars: The Last Jedi	Admiral Ackbar	Voiced by Tom Kane; Credited as Tim Rose

=== Television ===
Year	Title	Role	Notes
1977–78	Just William	Douglas	17 episodes
1989	Prince Caspian and The Voyage of the Dawn Treader	Aslan	5 episodes, sculptor and puppeteer
2012–13	Wizards vs Aliens	Nekross King	26 episodes
