= Pippa Hinchley =

British actress

- Born: 7 April 1966 (age 59); London, United Kingdom

Philippa Lucy Hinchley (born 7 April 1966) is a British actress from London who played Elaine Fenwick in Coronation Street. She has also been in The Bill, Bugs, Doctors, Holby City and EastEnders.

She appeared in the one-off drama Z for Zachariah, part of the last run of the BBC's Play For Today series in 1984. Acting opposite Anthony Andrews, she took the role of teenager Ann Burden, one of apparently only two survivors of a nuclear holocaust.

One of her earliest TV roles was as Anna the Dutch Girl, a teenage holidaymaker in Michael Palin's classic comedy East of Ipswich (1986), set in Southwold in the 1950s. She also appeared in the films Secret Places (1984), Dead Man's Folly (1986) and The Dressmaker (1988), and on TV in Last of the Summer Wine, People Like Us and Touch.

Hinchley was born in London and grew up there and in South Africa. She is a UK and US citizen.
