= Crime Traveller =

- Title card
- Genre: Crime drama Science fiction
- Created by: Anthony Horowitz
- Starring: Michael French; Chloë Annett; Sue Johnston; Paul Trussell; Richard Dempsey; Bob Goody
- Music by: Anne Dudley
- Country of origin: United Kingdom
- Original language: English
- No. of series: 1
- No. of episodes: 8

Production
- Producer: Brian Eastman
- Running time: 50 minutes
- Production company: Carnival Films

Original release
- Network: BBC One
- Release: 1 March – 19 April 1997

Crime Traveller is a 1997 British television science fiction detective series produced by Carnival Films for the BBC. It was based on the premise of using time travel for the purpose of solving crimes.

Anthony Horowitz created the series and wrote every episode. He had the idea while writing an episode of Poirot. Despite having over eight million viewers on a regular basis, Crime Traveller was not renewed after its first series. According to Horowitz, "The show wasn't exactly cut. There was a chasm at the BBC, created by the arrival of a new Head of Drama and our run ended at that time. There was no-one around to commission a new series...and so it just didn't happen."

== Plot ==
Jeff Slade is a detective with the Criminal Investigation Department (CID) of the local police force led by Kate Grisham; although unusually for such a position in the British police he is an armed officer, routinely carrying a handgun. Slade is a good detective who gets results although his approach is somewhat maverick and his methods do leave a lot to be desired and have more than once landed him in trouble. Amongst Slade's colleagues at the department is science officer Holly Turner who has a secret that Slade manages to uncover. Holly owns a working time machine that was built by her late father. The machine is able to take Slade and Turner back far enough in time to witness a crime as it happens and discover who committed it. As a result, Slade's track record with crime solving goes through the roof with case after case being solved in record time.

== Cast ==
- Michael French as DI Jeff Slade — City detective, and the only person other than Holly who knows about the time machine.
- Chloë Annett as Holly Turner — Forensic scientist whose father invented the time machine, which she keeps and adjusts in her apartment.
- Sue Johnston as DCI Kate Grisham — Slade's irritable boss who he is constantly getting on the wrong side of.
- Paul Trussell as DS Morris — Slade's slow-witted colleague, who usually takes the credit for his success.
- Richard Dempsey as DC Nicky Robson — A posh, intelligent but naïve trainee detective, too helpful and trusting for his own good.
- Bob Goody as Danny — Caretaker at Holly's apartment block, who is constantly having to deal with the power outages caused by Holly and Slade's use of the time machine.

== Episodes ==
No.	Title	Directed by	Written by	Original release date	Viewers (millions)
1	"Jeff Slade and the Loop of Infinity"	Brian Farnham	Anthony Horowitz	1 March 1997	TBA
Slade is in trouble with his boss when a stakeout goes wrong, but his partner, Holly Turner, has a secret plan to help him out. Her methods, however, are somewhat unusual and involve a time machine.
2	"Death in the Family"	Rick Stroud	Anthony Horowitz	8 March 1997	TBA
When Holly's Aunt Mary is poisoned in a five star restaurant, she and Slade travel back in time to find the murderer, but she discovers that her relatives aren't the people who she originally thought they were. Things take an unexpected turn when she is arrested for the crime herself.
3	"Fashion Shoot"	Brian Farnham	Anthony Horowitz	15 March 1997	TBA
When top fashion designer Sonia Duvall receives death threats, the entire division is assigned to guard her at the forthcoming fashion show. Their efforts fail, however, and she is shot on the catwalk - but Slade and Holly soon discover all is not what it seems.
4	"The Revenge of the Chronology Protection Hypothesis"	Rick Stroud	Anthony Horowitz	22 March 1997	TBA
When Holly sees a news report telling her that Slade has been shot, she travels back in time to try and prevent the shooting. However, she discovers that her own actions may have caused the shooting in the first place. Holly is forced to go against everything she's ever believed, and goes on a seemingly hopeless quest to save him.
5	"Sins of the Father"	Rick Stroud	Anthony Horowitz	29 March 1997	TBA
Slade is framed for stealing diamonds, and it's suspiciously like a similar incident which had happened to his father, Jack, nearly five years ago. With the help of Holly, will he be able to prove that both Jack and himself are innocent? Soon enough, they find their pasts coming back to haunt them.
6	"Death Minister"	Brian Farnham	Anthony Horowitz	5 April 1997	TBA
When Grisham becomes suspicious of Slade's success rate in solving crimes, Holly decides to warn Slade that they have been using the machine too much - but when an MP is killed, they simply can't resist taking a look. Temptation proves too much for Slade, however, and he later uses the machine without Holly's knowledge.
7	"The Lottery Experiment"	Brian Farnham	Anthony Horowitz	12 April 1997	TBA
To apologise for using the machine without asking, Slade hatches a way to win the lottery, in order to secure the money Holly needs to finish the final stages of construction. He goes back in time to find the winning numbers, but ends up discovering that putting his practice into theory is going to be harder than he first thought.
8	"The Broken Crystal"	Rick Stroud	Anthony Horowitz	19 April 1997	TBA
Holly's old flame comes back into her life, and Slade finds that his jealousy gets the better of him. Meanwhile, the most expensive and most vital part of the machine breaks, cutting Holly and Slade's time travelling escapades short. A new problem arises when the possibility of another time machine is brought into question. Will they take it?

== Home media ==
Revelation Films released the entire series on DVD on 21 June 2004. The DVD release includes an exclusive interview with writer and creator Anthony Horowitz.

== See also ==
- Quantum Leap, an American science fiction show involving time travel to fix the past; this often involves crime solving.
- Seven Days, an American science fiction show in which a government-controlled machine can send one man a week back in time, though the expense means that it is only used to avert serious disasters; this can involve stopping criminals or terrorists.
- Timecop, a 1994 science-fiction film starring Jean-Claude Van Damme as a time-travelling police officer.
