= Kenny Baker (English actor) =

English actor and musician (1934–2016)

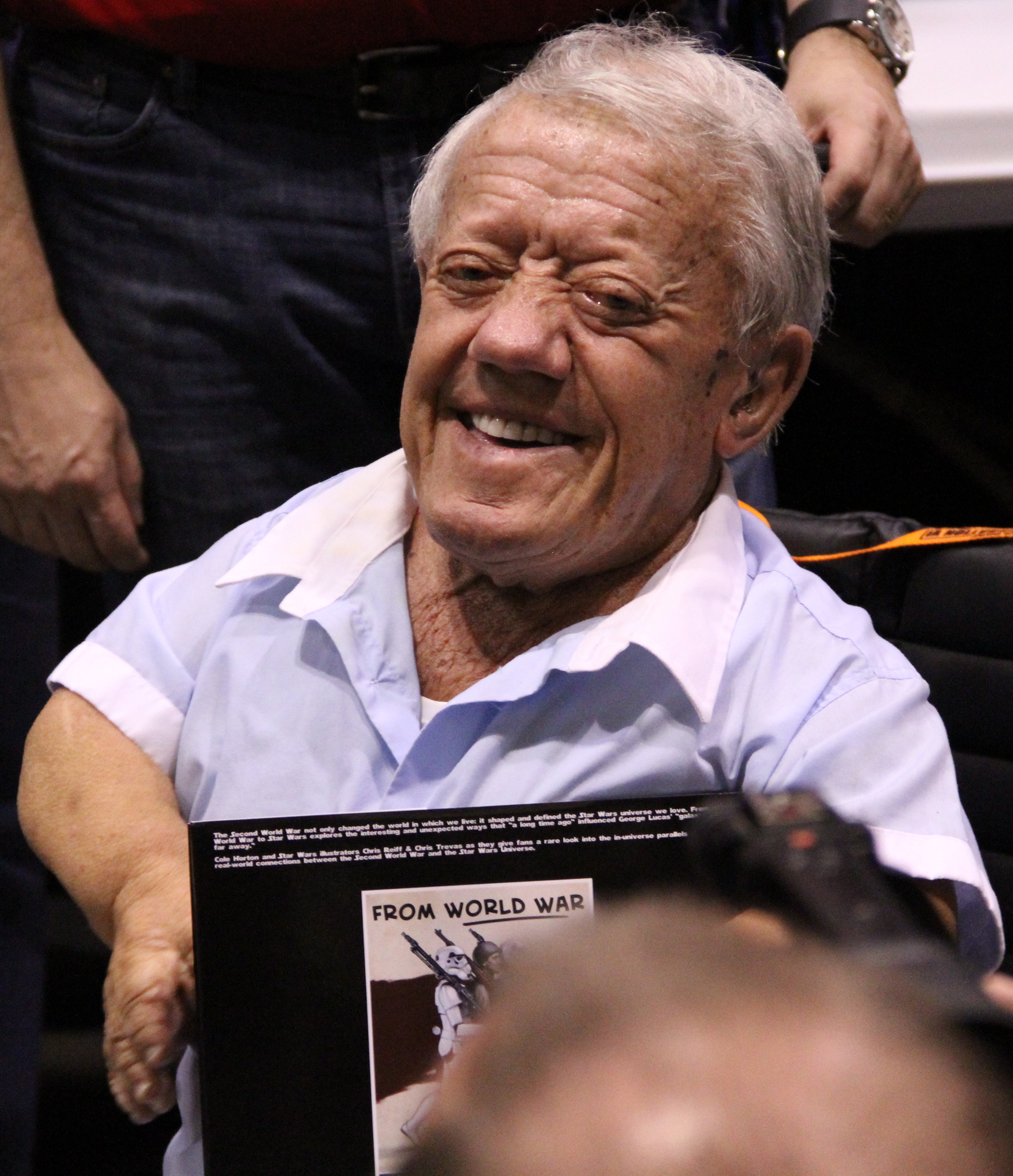
- Baker at Star Wars Celebration VI in 2012
- Born: Kenneth George Baker; 24 August 1934; Birmingham, West Midlands, England
- Died: 13 August 2016 (aged 81); Preston, Lancashire, England
- Resting place: Lytham Park Cemetery & Crematorium, Lancashire, England
- Occupations: Actor, comedian, musician
- Years active: 1960–2016
- Known for: R2-D2 in Star Wars
- Height: 3 ft 8 in (1.12 m)
- Spouse: Eileen Baker (m. 1970; died 1993)
- Children: 2

Kenneth George Baker (24 August 1934 – 13 August 2016) was a British actor, comedian and musician. He portrayed the character R2-D2 in the Star Wars franchise and also appeared in The Elephant Man, Time Bandits, Willow, Flash Gordon, Amadeus and Labyrinth.

== Early life ==
Baker was born and educated in Birmingham, West Midlands, and at a boarding school in Kent. He was the son of Ethel (1906–1990), a pianist and dress maker, and Harold Baker (1908–1949), an artist, musician and draughtsman. He went to live with his father, stepmother, and half-sister in Hastings, Sussex.

Due to his dwarfism, Baker stood 3 ft 8 in (1.12 m) as an adult. Both his parents were of average height.

== Career ==
=== Beginnings ===
In 1951, Baker was approached on the street by a woman who invited him to join John Lester's theatrical troupe of little people. This was his first taste of show business. Later, he joined a circus for a brief time, learned to ice skate and appeared in many ice shows. He formed a successful comedy act called The Mini Tones with entertainer Jack Purvis and played in nightclubs.

=== Star Wars ===
==== 1977–1983: Star Wars original trilogy ====
While working with Purvis and the Minitones, Baker was selected by George Lucas to operate the robot ("droid") R2-D2 in the fantasy feature film Star Wars, released in 1977. Baker recalled that he initially turned down the role, concerned about breaking up the Minitones partnership when the duo had reached the final on the British television talent show Opportunity Knocks. On 22 March 1976, Baker's first day of filming took place at Tunisia which provided the setting for Tatooine. He "wore a harness that secured the R2-D2 unit to his body" and controlled turning the head, walk or light up whenever it was required. This version of the unit in which Baker could fit inside weighed about 80 pounds and was effective for making his character wobble and bow as well as turning his dome. There was an opaque window and although Baker could not see much at all, he insisted he "didn't need to, as long as [he] could see who [he] was supposed to be reacting to." A mechanical R2-D2 was built for some scenes which required the droid to roll along on three legs. There were many versions of R2-D2 for the first six theatrical films. The success of Star Wars launched a multimedia franchise leading to two more films rounding out the original trilogy, the prequel trilogy and film conventions which continued Baker's association with his character and the franchise. Prior to the release Baker, like the cast and crew, did not expect the film to be a success.

Baker appears as R2-D2 in six of the episodic theatrical Star Wars films, (Note: Episodes I to VI of the Skywalker saga. Baker and Anthony Daniels were the only actors to appear and portray the same characters in the first six theatrically released films (distributed by 20th Century Fox) from 1977's A New Hope to 2005's Revenge of the Sith.) and played an additional role in 1983's Return of the Jedi as Paploo, the ewok who steals an Imperial speeder bike. He was originally due to play the ewok named Wicket, but he fell ill and that role was handed over to Warwick Davis. Baker was featured in the 2004 documentary film, Empire of Dreams: The Story of the Star Wars Trilogy.

==== 1997–2005: Star Wars prequel trilogy ====
In a 1994 interview with Star Wars Insider, Baker hoped to be involved in the prequel trilogy noting that George Lucas said in an article that "the robots" (C-3PO and R2-D2) were the only characters to survive the series. Prior to the beginning of filming on Star Wars: Episode I - The Phantom Menace in 1997, fans campaigned on the Internet to retain Baker as R2-D2; George Lucas replied that the actor would reprise the role. Baker operated R2-D2 for scenes which did not require radio-controlled versions of the character. While some of the younger versions of established characters were portrayed by new cast members, Baker, Anthony Daniels, Frank Oz and Ian McDiarmid were the only actors from the original trilogy to reprise their roles. The film was released to cinemas in May 1999.

As digital technology advanced (allowing R2-D2 to fly and climb stairs) and the need to have Baker operating the unit decreased over time, he acted sporadically in the prequel trilogy. He requested to appear in one scene for Star Wars: Episode II – Attack of the Clones "for old time's sake." Baker and Daniels filmed the one scene at Ealing Studios; R2-D2 and C-3PO attending Anakin and Padme's secret wedding on Naboo. Hayden Christensen and Natalie Portman had already filmed their scene at Lake Como, Italy so Baker's and Daniels' scene was later inserted. The one scene was the last day of filming for Attack of Clones. (Note: According to Daniels, at the time he and Baker filmed the one scene, the film was not titled yet.)

By time the film was released to cinemas in May 2002, work had begun on the last film of the prequel trilogy. On 23 April 2003, it was announced on the Star Wars website that Baker would reprise his role in Star Wars: Episode III - Revenge of the Sith, the last instalment of the prequel trilogy and last film to be distributed by 20th Century Fox. Two of his co-stars, Daniels and Peter Mayhew from the original trilogy were also announced to be reprising their roles as C-3PO and Chewbacca respectively. In a 2015 interview, Baker said he was proud to have been involved in the franchise saying that seeing the Tantive IV set during filming for Revenge of the Sith brought back memories "bringing the story full circle."

==== 2012–2016: Last Star Wars film, successor and last appearance ====
Following Disney's acquisition of Lucasfilm in October 2012, Baker continued his Star Wars association with the R2-D2 character in Star Wars: The Force Awakens, which was released on 18 December 2015 in North America. He was going to be a member of the cast, but he served as consultant for the character instead. In November 2015, it was confirmed that Jimmy Vee was cast as R2-D2 in Star Wars: The Last Jedi, replacing Baker. Baker attended several conventions as part of Star Wars Celebration and other conventions in Europe, the United States and more as a guest. Celebration Europe III in July 2016 marked his last appearance at Celebration and the London Film & Comic Con on 31 July 2016 marked his last appearance at a convention.

Daniels acknowledged Baker's enthusiasm saying his co-star "adored his association with Star Wars and Artoo and the fans." This was echoed by Jeremy Bulloch who portrayed Boba Fett saying, "He was an amazing person who only two weeks ago was greeting fans and signing autographs. We will all miss him greatly - what a superstar he was." Daniels also described Baker's waddling as R2-D2 into the escape pod in A New Hope as "especially memorable." However, they both admitted their relationship did not match their on-screen relationship. This was echoed in an earlier interview; Baker said they were not close friends but expressed optimism that if he and Daniels were both involved in the prequel trilogy they would "have an opportunity to get to know each other better".

=== Other work ===
Baker's other films include The Elephant Man, Time Bandits (also with Jack Purvis), Willow (also with Purvis and Warwick Davis), Flash Gordon, Amadeus and Jim Henson's Labyrinth.

On television, he appeared in the British medical drama Casualty. He also had a part in the BBC production of The Chronicles of Narnia. In the late 1990s, Baker launched a brief comedy career. He played Casanova in the 1993 movie UFO.

In November 2009, his biography, From Tiny Acorns: The Kenny Baker Story, was written with Ken Mills and published by Writestuff Autographs.

== Personal life ==
Baker resided in Preston, Lancashire. He was married to actress Eileen Baker (who co-starred with him in the 1977 film Wombling Free) from 1970 until her death in 1993. Although Eileen also had dwarfism, their two children did not inherit their parents' dwarfism. One of their sons worked at Planet Hollywood in London.

Baker was invited to attend the premiere of Star Wars: The Force Awakens in Los Angeles in December 2015, but was too ill to travel to the US. He had a lung condition for years. Instead, Baker attended the film's premiere in London.

== Death and tributes ==
Baker died on 13 August 2016, 11 days shy of his 82nd birthday. His funeral was held at the Park Cemetery and Crematorium in Lytham St Annes on 24 August 2016.

Peter Mayhew said, "Cherish the times of your life. Here's to you Kenny Baker. The man I made so many memories with, swapped stories with, entertained with, and carried to his hotel room at the end of the night!"

Mark Hamill tweeted, "Goodbye Kenny Baker. A lifelong loyal friend - I loved his optimism and determination. He WAS the droid I was looking!"

George Lucas paid tribute acknowledging Baker working hard despite the difficulties he faced and saying, "Kenny was truly the heart and soul of R2-D2 and will be missed by all his fans and everyone who knew him."

== Filmography ==
=== Film ===
Year	Title	Role	Notes	Ref.
1960	Circus of Horrors	Dwarf	Uncredited	
1977	Star Wars: Episode IV – A New Hope	R2-D2		
1977	Wombling Free	Bungo		
1980	Star Wars: Episode V – The Empire Strikes Back	R2-D2		
1980	Flash Gordon	Dwarf		
1980	The Elephant Man	Plumed Dwarf		
1981	Time Bandits	Fidgit		
1983	Star Wars: Episode VI – Return of the Jedi	R2-D2, Paploo		
1984	Amadeus	Parody Commendatore		
1986	Mona Lisa	Brighton Busker		
1986	Labyrinth	Goblin Corps		
1987	Star Tours	R2-D2	Short film, uncredited	
1987	Sleeping Beauty	Elf		
1988	Willow	Nelwyn Band Member	Uncredited	
1993	U.F.O.	Giacomo Casanova		
1999	The King and I	Captain Orton	Voice, credited as Ken Baker	
1999	Star Wars: Episode I – The Phantom Menace	R2-D2		
2002	24 Hour Party People	Zookeeper	Uncredited	
2002	Star Wars: Episode II – Attack of the Clones	R2-D2		
2002	The Cage	Merlin	Short film	
2005	Star Wars: Episode III – Revenge of the Sith	R2-D2		
2013	One Night at the Aristo	The Bartender	Voice, short film	
2015	Star Wars: The Force Awakens	R2-D2	Consultant	

=== Television ===
Year	Title	Role	Notes	Ref.
1962	Man of the World	The Croat	Episode: "Specialist for the Kill", credited as Ken Baker	
1975	Dave Allen at Large	Salesman	Season 4, Episode 36	
1980	The Muppet Show	R2-D2	Episode: "The Stars of Star Wars"	
1981	The Goodies	Dwarf	Episode: "Snow White 2"	
1982	The Hunchback of Notre Dame	Pick Pocket	TV film	
1984	The Adventure Game	HRH The Rangdo of Arg	Two episodes	
1985	Der Rosenkavalier	Baron Och's Retinue	TV film	
1989	Prince Caspian and the Voyage of the Dawn Treader	Dufflepud	TV special	
1990	Ben Elton: The Man from Auntie	Invisible Demon	Episode 5	
1991	The Paradise Club	Himself	Episode: "Family Favours"	
1992	Casualty	Archie	Episode: "Act of Faith"	
1999	Boobs in the Wood	Bruce the Convict	Direct-to-video	
2003	Swiss Toni	Guyler	Episode: "Cars Don't Make You Fat"	
2007	Casualty	Charles Isaac	Episode: "The Miracle on Harry's Last Shift"	
2008	Bring Back...Star Wars	Himself	TV Documentary	
2014	Tomorrow's Worlds: The Unearthly History of Science Fiction	Himself	TV documentary series	

== Print sources ==
- Bouzereau, Laurent; Duncan, Judy (1999). The Making of Star Wars, Episode I – The Phantom Menace (Hardback ed.). Ballatine. ISBN 0-345-43111-1.
- Cooper, Christopher, ed. (2025). Star Wars: Revenge of the Sith The 20th Anniversary Special (Hardback ed.). London: Titan Magazines. ISBN 9781787746725.
- Daniels, Anthony (2019). I Am C-3PO: The Inside Story (Hardback ed.). London: DK. ISBN 9780241357606.
- Hearn, Marcus (2005). The Cinema of George Lucas (Hardback ed.). New York: Harry N. Abrams, Incorporated. ISBN 9780810949683.
- Rinzler, J.W (2005). The Making of Star Wars: Revenge of the Sith (Paperback ed.). London: Ebury Press. ISBN 9780091897376.
- Rinzler, J.W (2007). The Making of Star Wars. Ebury Press. ISBN 9780091920142.
- Rinzler, J.W (2010). The Making of The Empire Strikes Back. Aurum. ISBN 9781845135553.
- Rinzler, J.W. (2013). The Making of Return of the Jedi. Aurum. ISBN 9781781310762.
- Robb, Brian J., ed. (2007). "Anthony Daniels & Kenny Baker: C-3PO and R2-D2". Star Wars Insider 94. Titan Magazines.
- Wilkins, Jonathan, ed. (2016). The Best of Star Wars Insider Volume 1 (Paperback ed.). London: Titan Books. ISBN 9781785851162.
- Wilkins, Jonathan, ed. (2016b). The Best of Star Wars Insider Volume 4 (Paperback) (1st ed.). London: Titan Books. ISBN 9781785851902.
- Wilkins, Jonathan, ed. (2017). Star Wars: A New Hope The Official Celebration Special. London: Titan Magazines. ISBN 9781785864605.
- Wilkins, Jonathan, ed. (2019). Star Wars: Aliens, Creatures and Droids (Paperback) (1st ed.). London: Titan Books. ISBN 9781785851964.
