= Jack Purvis (actor) =

British actor (1937–1997)

- Born: 13 July 1937; London, England
- Died: 21 November 1997 (aged 60); Bushey, Hertfordshire, England
- Occupation: Actor
- Height: 4 ft 2 in (1.27 m)

Jack Purvis (13 July 1937 – 21 November 1997) was a British actor. Purvis had dwarfism, and at 4 feet 2 inches (1.27 m) was mainly cast in roles requiring actors of short stature. He appeared in three of filmmaker Terry Gilliam's early fantasy films, with significant roles in Time Bandits and The Adventures of Baron Munchausen as well as a role in each film of the original trilogy in filmmaker George Lucas's Star Wars.

== Career ==
For twenty years until 1991, Purvis performed as part of a musical comedy double-act with Kenny Baker, billed as the "Mini-Tones" (Baker was also a dwarf). Purvis played the trumpet to Baker's mouth-organ and vibraphone. The duo would attend auditions for Star Wars in 1976, where Baker was instantly cast as R2-D2. At that time the duo had reached the final on the talent show Opportunity Knocks, and were reluctant to put the Mini-Tones work on hold. After some negotiation, Purvis was also hired to appear in the film, and would go on to play a different alien creature in each film of the original trilogy.

In 1991, Purvis became quadriplegic after his neck was broken in a car repair accident. This and the 1990 death of David Rappaport led to Terry Gilliam's indefinitely shelving an intended sequel to Time Bandits, where both actors played titular roles.

Purvis died in November 1997 at the age of 60.

== Filmography ==
=== Film ===
Year	Title	Role	Notes
1966	Snow White and the Seven Dwarfs	Bashful	
1969	Popdown	mini photographer	
1977	Wombling Free	Great Uncle Bulgaria	
1977	Star Wars	Chief Jawa	
1978	I'm Dickie - That's Show Business	on-screen participant	
1980	The Empire Strikes Back	Chief Ugnaught	
1980	Not the Nine O'Clock News	Boxer on the Television	uncredited
1981	Time Bandits	Wally	
1981	The Goodies	Jester	uncredited
1982	The Dark Crystal	Muppet performer	Additional
1983	Classic Creatures: Return of the Jedi		Additional
1983	Return of the Jedi	Teebo	
1985	Brazil	Dr. Chapman	
1986	Mona Lisa	Brighton Busker	
1986	Labyrinth	Goblin Corps	
1987	People Are the Same the Universe Over	alien	
1988	Willow	Nelwyn Band Member	Uncredited
1988	The Adventures of Baron Munchausen	Jeremy / Gustavus	
1989	Prince Caspian and The Voyage of the Dawn Treader	Dufflepud Leader	
1989	Oingo Boingo: Skeletons in the Closet		Additional
1990	The Silver Chair	Golg	
