= Wombling Free =

1977 British film adaptation of The Wombles

- Theatrical release poster
- Directed by: Lionel Jeffries
- Written by: Lionel Jeffries
- Produced by: Ian Shand
- Starring: The Wombles; David Tomlinson; Frances de la Tour; Bonnie Langford
- Narrated by: Lionel Jeffries
- Cinematography: Alan Hume
- Edited by: Peter Tanner
- Music by: Mike Batt; Chris Spedding
- Distributed by: The Rank Organisation
- Release date: 19 March 1978
- Running time: 96 minutes
- Country: United Kingdom
- Language: English

Wombling Free is a 1978 British film adaptation of the children's television series The Wombles. Directed by Lionel Jeffries, it stars The Wombles, David Tomlinson, Frances de la Tour, and Bonnie Langford.

According to critic Noel Crown, "Wombling Free might have appeared a safe investment, given the popularity of the books, TV series, novelty pop group, and associated merchandise, but was universally received with hostility."

== Plot ==
Based on the BBC children's series, this film charts the adventures of the Wombles, a colony of small litter-picking creatures who live in Wimbledon Common in 1970s London.

Great Uncle Bulgaria Womble recounts the story of how Wombles have always been cleaning up after humans from the very beginning with Adam and Eve, and how Wombles continue to clean up after humans for generations up to the present day all around the world, including the United States, Russia, and India. Only seen by those who believe in them, their work goes largely unnoticed until a young girl, Kim, spots them and their worthwhile purpose. As she invites them to her birthday party, her father is forced to believe as he comes face to face with Orinoco, Tobermory and the others. A public meeting is set to prove to the local population that the Wombles do exist and should be aided in their anti-rubbish campaign. But on the day in question, a storm breaks out over the Common.

At the end, Kim, Wombles and all the children help in cleaning up Wimbledon Common.

== Cast ==
=== Humans ===
- David Tomlinson as Roland Frogmorton
- Frances de la Tour as Julia Frogmorton, Roland's wife
- Bonnie Langford as Felicity 'Kim' Frogmorton, Julia & Roland's daughter
- Bernard Spear as Arnold Takahashi
- Yasuko Nagazumi as Doris Takahashi
- John Junkin as County Surveyor
- Reg Lye as Assistant Surveyor

=== Wombles ===
==== Actors ====
- Kenny Baker as Bungo the drummer
- Eileen Baker as Tobermory the keyboardist
- Sadie Corre as Madame Cholet the saxophonist
- Tony Friel as Wellington the lead guitarist
- John Lummiss as MacWomble the rhythm guitarist
- Jack Purvis as Great Uncle Bulgaria the violinist and music director
- Albert Wilkinson as Tomsk the bassist
- Marcus Powell as Orinoco the lead singer.

==== Voices ====
- David Jason
- Janet Brown
- Jon Pertwee
- John Graham
- Lionel Jeffries

== Production ==
Lionel Jeffries was hired to write the script and direct. Finance came from the Rank Organisation.

Filming took place in July and August 1977. Most exterior shots were filmed in Black Park in Wexham and Gerrards Cross, Buckinghamshire. Studio work was done at Pinewood.

Wombling Free was part of a slate of films released in the late 70s through the Rank Organisation, who re-entered the filmmaking arena.

== Soundtrack ==
An accompanying soundtrack was released by CBS featuring a selection of Mike Batt's score cues plus new recordings and remixes of previous Womble songs as featured in the film. In 2011 the soundtrack was released on CD by the Dramatico label.

1. "The Wombling Song (Film Version)"
2. "The Creation Of The World (Main Title)"
3. "Edinburgh Rock"
4. "Introduction From Minuetto Allegretto"
5. "Introduction To The Womble Burrow"
6. "Wombling White Tie & Tails (Film Version)"
7. "Under The Hills And Not Far Away"
8. "Madame Cholet"
9. "Mr. Roland Frogmorton's Music"
10. "Miss Felicity Kim Frogmorton's Music"
11. "Frogmorton's Theme"
12. "The March Of The Machines"
13. "Exercise Is Good For You (Film Version)"
14. "The Underground Garden"
15. "Count Down And Lift-Off"
16. "Womble Of The Universe"
17. "The Queen"

== Reception ==
The film was originally meant to be released over Christmas 1977 but this was delayed until Easter 1978 to avoid Christmas competition.

The Evening Post called it "a super little job". The Daily Telegraph called it "a very long 96 minutes indeed." "All too slack, too coy and too late" wrote The Sunday Telegraph.

Sight and Sound wrote "Saddled with instantly forgettable songs, a flabby plot, and a bromidic human family cut to the Disney pattern, the Wombles of Wimbledon make a sadly inauspicious big screen debut."

Filmink wrote "truth be told, it's not very good – it's hard to tell the Wombles apart, there's not much of a story, the main girl is annoying. We probably would have loved it if we'd seen it when we were five though, and it was fun to see David Tomlinson."
