= Sadie Corré =

English actress and dancer (1918–2009)

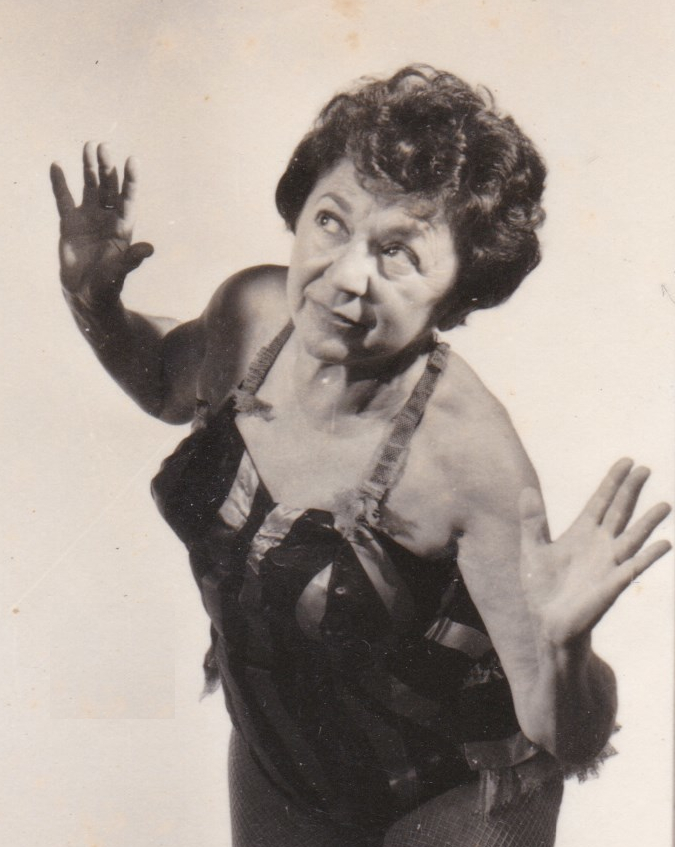
- Born: Sarah Corré; 31 May 1918; Bognor, Sussex, England, UK
- Died: 26 August 2009 (aged 91); St John's Wood, London, England, UK
- Education: Italia Conti
- Occupations: Actress, dancer
- Years active: 1925–1995
- Height: 4 ft 2 in (127 cm)
- Parent(s): Abraham Corré, Kate Corré

Sadie Corré (31 May 1918 – 26 August 2009) was an English actress, tap dancer, comic performer and leading pantomime cat. She was sometimes credited as Sadie Corrie.

== Early years ==
Her parents were Abraham and Kate Corré, who owned the Carlton Tavern public house. Her father died in 1919 and her mother continued to run the pub alone until she married William Bundle in August 1922. From this union Sadie gained a half brother, Edward, and two half sisters, Joan and Alma. Under medical advice Sadie was given huge numbers of over-ripe bananas to eat as this was considered to be the cure at that time for her lack of height. It did not work, however, and Sadie never ate bananas again.

Corré was educated and trained at the Italia Conti stage school, where a classmate was Dinah Sheridan. Her first stage appearance was aged 7 at Brighton Palace Pier and her first professional role was aged 12 as Trouble in Madame Butterfly at the Streatham Hill Theatre.

Her next appearance was in Where the Rainbow Ends at the Holborn Empire. Corré's film roles at that time included juvenile parts with Marlene Dietrich and Richard Tauber. After Holborn she appeared in Noël Coward's Cavalcade in 1931 for 11 months at the Theatre Royal in London's Drury Lane. Her next stage work was for the producer and manager Charles B. Cochran during 1935 and 1936 at the Adelphi Theatre in Follow the Sun with Vic Oliver.

Corré's break came in 1937 when she was invited by Hughie Green to join his touring concert party "Hughie Green and his Gang". With a cast entirely made up of children, the company toured until the outbreak of World War II in 1939. Corré later appeared on the same bill as Max Miller, Robb Wilton and Wee Georgie Wood. During 1939 and 1940 she toured as Michael in Peter Pan and spent the rest of the war touring the country with ENSA, entertaining the troops. In 1947, while she was appearing at the Gateshead Empire, Hughie Green invited her to join his new roadshow Opportunity Knocks.

== Pantomime cat ==
In 1948, Corré met the pantomime dame Clarkson Rose who put her in his pantomime Goody Two-Shoes at the King's Theatre in Hammersmith. She played a four-month season in 1960–1961 at the London Palladium with Norman Wisdom in Turn Again, Whittington as the Cat. Over the next 20 years. Corré was a regular pantomime cat, appearing with Arthur Askey, Eddie Gray, Dana, Spike Milligan, Joe Brown, Tommy Cooper, Norman Vaughan and Jess Conrad. She appeared in two award-winning television documentaries: Lord Snowdon's Born to Be Small in 1971 and The Skin Game in 1970, an edition of LWT's arts magazine series Aquarius that examined pantomime animal traditions.

== Later years ==
Her last stage appearance was with Keith Harris when she played Cuddles at the 1984 Royal Command Performance. Arthritis forced her to retire and her cat costume was donated to London's Theatre Museum. Corré was a Past Officer of the Grand Order of Lady Ratlings and had sat on the Board of the Variety Artists' Federation.

Corré appeared as a Transylvanian in the cult film The Rocky Horror Picture Show as well as an Ewok in Return of the Jedi.

== Selected filmography ==
- Funny Bones (1995) as Poodle Woman
- Caravaggio (1986) as Princess Colonna
- Return of the Jedi (1983; as Sadie Corrie) as Ewok Warrior
- The Dark Crystal (1982; as Sadie Corrie) as Slave Master
- Wombling Free (1977) as Womble, Madame Cholet
- The Old Curiosity Shop (1975; uncredited) as Midget
- The Rocky Horror Picture Show (1975) as a Transylvanian
- Bright's Boffins (TV series; 1970) as Oswald (unknown number of episodes)
- The Body (1970) as herself
- Chitty Chitty Bang Bang (1968) as Field Worker
- Devil Doll (1964; uncredited) as Hugo the Dummy
