= Brazil (1985 film) =

1985 film by Terry Gilliam

- UK theatrical release poster by Bill Garland
- Directed by: Terry Gilliam
- Screenplay by: Terry Gilliam; Tom Stoppard; Charles McKeown
- Produced by: Arnon Milchan
- Starring: Jonathan Pryce; Robert De Niro; Katherine Helmond; Ian Holm; Bob Hoskins; Michael Palin; Ian Richardson; Peter Vaughan; Kim Greist
- Cinematography: Roger Pratt
- Edited by: Julian Doyle
- Music by: Michael Kamen
- Production companies: Embassy International Pictures; Brazil Productions
- Distributed by: Universal Pictures (United States); 20th Century Fox (International)
- Release dates: 20 February 1985 (France); 22 February 1985 (United Kingdom); 18 December 1985 (United States)
- Running time: 142 minutes (final cut); 132 minutes (American Universal cut); 94 minutes ("Love Conquers All" cut)
- Countries: United Kingdom; United States
- Languages: English; French; German
- Budget: $15 million
- Box office: $9.9 million (US) (Note: This is US-only box office from the Universal release, and does not include the 20th Century Fox release in the rest of the world.)

Brazil is a 1985 dystopian science fiction black comedy film directed by Terry Gilliam and written by Gilliam, Charles McKeown, and Tom Stoppard. A co-production between the United Kingdom and the United States, the film stars Jonathan Pryce, Robert De Niro, Katherine Helmond, Ian Holm, Bob Hoskins, Michael Palin, Ian Richardson, Peter Vaughan, and Kim Greist.

The film centres on Sam Lowry, a low-ranking bureaucrat trying to find a woman who appears in his dreams while he is working in a mind-numbing job and living in a small flat, set in a dystopian world in which there is an over-reliance on poorly maintained (and rather whimsical) machines and where people found guilty of crimes are liable for the costs of their interrogation by torture. Brazil's satire of technocracy, bureaucracy, hyper-surveillance, corporate statism, and state capitalism is reminiscent of George Orwell's 1949 novel Nineteen Eighty-Four, and it has been called "Kafkaesque" as well as absurdist.

Sarah Street's British National Cinema (1997) described the film as a "fantasy/satire on bureaucratic society", and John Scalzi's Rough Guide to Sci-Fi Movies (2005) described it as a "dystopian satire". Jack Mathews, a film critic and the author of The Battle of Brazil (1987), described the film as "satirizing the bureaucratic, largely dysfunctional industrial world that had been driving Gilliam crazy all his life". Despite its title, the film is not about the country Brazil nor does it take place there; it is named after the recurrent theme song, Ary Barroso's "Aquarela do Brasil", known simply as "Brazil" to British audiences, as performed by Geoff Muldaur.

Although a success in Europe, the film was unsuccessful in its initial North American release. It has since become a cult film. In 1999, the British Film Institute voted Brazil the 54th greatest British film of all time. In 2017, a poll of 150 actors, directors, writers, producers and critics for Time Out magazine saw it ranked the 24th best British film ever.

== Plot ==
In a dystopian, polluted, hyper-consumerist, overbearing, bureaucratic, totalitarian future based on elements of the 20th century, Sam Lowry is a low-level government employee at the Records Department of the Ministry of Information, who frequently dreams of himself as a winged warrior saving a damsel in distress. One day, shortly before Christmas, an insect becomes jammed in a teleprinter, which misprints a copy of an arrest warrant it was receiving. This leads to the arrest and death during interrogation of cobbler Archibald Buttle instead of suspected terrorist Archibald Tuttle.

Sam discovers the mistake when he finds that the wrong bank account has been debited for the arrest. He visits Buttle's widow to give her the refund where he catches a glimpse of her upstairs neighbour Jill Layton, a truck driver, and is astonished to discover that she resembles the woman from his dreams. He frantically tries to approach Jill, but she disappears before he can find her. Jill has been trying to help Mrs Buttle establish what happened to her husband, but her efforts have been obstructed by bureaucracy. Unbeknownst to her, she is now considered a terrorist accomplice of Tuttle for attempting to report the wrongful arrest of Buttle.

Meanwhile, Sam reports a fault in his apartment's air conditioning. Central Services are uncooperative, but Tuttle unexpectedly comes to his assistance. Tuttle explains that he used to work for Central Services but left because of his dislike of the tedious and repetitive paperwork, and now illegally works as a freelance heating engineer. Tuttle repairs Sam's air conditioning, but when two Central Services workers, Spoor and Dowser, arrive, Sam has to stall to allow Tuttle to escape.

Sam discovers that Jill's records have been classified and the only way to access them is to be promoted to the Department of Information Retrieval. He had previously turned down a promotion arranged by his well-connected mother Ida, who is obsessed with the rejuvenating plastic surgery of cosmetic surgeon Dr Jaffe. Sam retracts his refusal by speaking with Deputy Minister Eugene Helpmann at a party hosted by Ida. After obtaining Jill's records, Sam tracks her down before she can be arrested. Sam clumsily confesses his love to Jill, and they cause mayhem as they escape government agents. They stop at a mall and are frightened by a terrorist bombing (part of a campaign that has been occurring around the city). Following an altercation with the government agents who have arrived at the scene of the bombing, he wakes up in a prisoner transport vehicle.

At work, Sam is chastised by his new boss Mr Warrenn for his lack of productivity. He returns home to find that Spoor and Dowser have repossessed his apartment. Tuttle appears in secret and helps him exact revenge on the two Central Services workers by filling their environment suits with raw sewage. Jill finds him outside his apartment, and the two take refuge in Ida's unoccupied home, where they share their first kiss. He falsifies government records to indicate her death, allowing her to escape pursuit. The two spend the night together, but in the morning are apprehended by government agents at gunpoint.

Sam learns that Jill was killed during his arrest. Charged with a number of crimes, he is restrained in a chair in a large, empty cylindrical room, to be tortured by his old friend Jack Lint. As Jack is about to start the torture, Tuttle and other members of the resistance break into the Ministry, shooting Jack, rescuing Sam and blowing up the Ministry building. Sam and Tuttle flee together, but Tuttle mysteriously disappears amid a mass of scraps of paperwork from the destroyed building.

Sam stumbles into the funeral of Ida's friend, who has died following botched cosmetic surgery. He discovers that his mother now resembles Jill and is too busy being fawned over by young men to care about her son's plight. Government agents disrupt the funeral, and he falls into the open casket. Through a black void, he lands in a street from his daydreams and tries to escape police and monsters by climbing a pile of flex-ducts. Opening a door, he passes through it and is surprised to be in a truck driven by Jill. The two leave the city together.

However, this "happy ending" is a delusion: it is revealed that Sam is still strapped to the torture chair. Realising that he has been permanently driven insane after a frontal lobotomy, Jack and Mr Helpmann declare him a lost cause and leave the room. He remains in the chair, smiling and humming "Aquarela do Brasil" to himself.

== Cast ==
=== Main cast ===
- Jonathan Pryce as Sam Lowry
- Robert De Niro as Archibald "Harry" Tuttle
- Katherine Helmond as Mrs. Ida Lowry
- Ian Holm as Mr. Kurtzmann, Sam's boss at Records
- Bob Hoskins as Spoor, a government-employed heating engineer who resents Harry Tuttle
- Michael Palin as Jack Lint
- Ian Richardson as Mr. Warrenn, Sam's new boss at Information Retrieval
- Peter Vaughan as Mr. Eugene Helpmann, the Deputy Minister of Information
- Kim Greist as Jill Layton

=== Supporting cast ===
- Jim Broadbent as Dr. Louis Jaffe
- Barbara Hicks as Mrs. Terrain
- Charles McKeown (co-writer) as Harvey Lime, Sam's co-worker
- Derrick O'Connor as Dowser
- Kathryn Pogson as Shirley Terrain
- Bryan Pringle as Spiro
- Sheila Reid as Mrs. Veronica Buttle
- Ray Cooper as technician
- Brian Miller as Mr. Archibald Buttle
- Simon Nash as Boy Buttle
- Simon Jones as arrest official
- Derek Deadman as Bill – Dept. of Works
- Nigel Planer as Charlie – Dept. of Works
- Terence Bayler as T.V. commercial presenter
- Gorden Kaye as M.O.I. lobby porter
- Bill Wallis as bespectacled lurker
- Jack Purvis as Dr. Chapman
- Elizabeth Spender as Alison/'Barbara' Lint
- Myrtle Devenish as typist in Jack's office
- John Pierce Jones as basement guard
- Ann Way as old lady with dog
- Don Henderson as first 'Black Maria' guard
- Howard Lew Lewis as second 'Black Maria' guard
- Oscar Quitak as interview official
- Harold Innocent as interview official
- John Grillo as interview official
- Ralph Nossek as interview official
- David Gant as interview official
- Patrick Connor as cell guard
- Roger Ashton-Griffiths as priest
- Sue Hodge as performer

In addition, director Terry Gilliam appeared in an uncredited cameo as the smoking man at Shang-ri La Towers.

== Production ==
=== Writing ===
Gilliam developed the story and wrote the first draft of the screenplay with Charles Alverson, who was paid for his work but was ultimately uncredited in the final film.

I had this pile of idea ... which was a loose collection of scenes running to about a hundred pages. First, I started writing with Chuck Alverson ... but within a couple of weeks it was clear that we were going in slightly different directions. This led to a break in our relationship and a messy situation. In the end, a deal was done – the scene in the restaurant is the only one that's still close to what he'd written.

— Terry Gilliam

At this point, the script had several elements in place but lacked structure. "The character of Buttle was called Timms and had no connection with Tuttle.... Jill was still the Timms' upstairs neighbour, but was a childrens' social worker and no relation to Sam's fantasy figure."

Gilliam next went to Tom Stoppard for script revisions which, according to Gilliam, "made sense of it all". For example, it's Stoppard who invented the confusion between Tuttle and Buttle that starts the whole plot. But then Gilliam felt that Stoppard "wasn't getting some of the characters right; he was losing their humanity.... So I brought Charles McKeown ... and we started reworking it." The final script is therefore credited to Gilliam, Stoppard and McKeown.

Brazil was developed under the titles The Ministry and 1984 ½, the latter a nod to not only Orwell's original Nineteen Eighty-Four but also to 8½ directed by Federico Fellini; Gilliam often cited Fellini as one of the defining influences on his visual style. During the film's production, other working titles floated about, including The Ministry of Torture, How I Learned to Live with the System—So Far, and So That's Why the Bourgeoisie Sucks, before settling on Brazil, relating to the name of its escapist signature tune.

In an interview with Salman Rushdie, Gilliam stated:

Brazil came specifically from the time, from the approaching of 1984. It was looming. In fact, the original title of Brazil was 1984 ½. Fellini was one of my great gods and it was 1984, so let's put them together. Unfortunately, that bastard Michael Radford did a version of 1984 and he called it 1984, so I was blown.

Gilliam sometimes refers to this film as the second in his "Trilogy of Imagination" films, starting with Time Bandits (1981) and ending with The Adventures of Baron Munchausen (1988). All are about the "craziness of our awkwardly ordered society and the desire to escape it through whatever means possible". All three movies focus on these struggles and attempts to escape them through imagination—Time Bandits, through the eyes of a child; Brazil, through the eyes of a man in his thirties; and Munchausen, through the eyes of an elderly man. In 2013, Gilliam also called Brazil the first installment of a dystopian satire trilogy, preceding 12 Monkeys (1995) and The Zero Theorem (2013), although he later denied having said this.

Gilliam has stated that Brazil was inspired by George Orwell's Nineteen Eighty-Four—which he has admitted never having read—but is written from a contemporary perspective rather than looking to the future as Orwell had. In Gilliam's words, his film was "the Nineteen Eighty-Four for 1984". Critics and analysts have pointed to many similarities and differences between the two, an example being that contrary to Winston Smith, Sam Lowry's spirit did not capitulate as he sank into complete catatonia.

The film's ending bears a strong similarity to the short story "An Occurrence at Owl Creek Bridge" by Ambrose Bierce. The tragicomic tone and philosophy of the film bear many resemblances to absurdist drama, a genre for which Brazil co-writer Tom Stoppard is widely acclaimed.

Gilliam tried to get finance for the film from Handmade Films after Monty Python's Life of Brian (1979). It was rejected but the studio agreed to finance Time Bandits. The success of that movie enabled Gilliam to obtain finance for Brazil from Universal.

=== Casting ===
Jonathan Pryce described the role of Sam Lowry as the highlight of his career, along with that of Lytton Strachey in Carrington.

Robert De Niro read the script and expressed interest in the role of Jack Lint, but Gilliam had already promised the part to Palin, a friend and regular collaborator. Palin described the character as "someone who was everything that Jonathan Pryce's character wasn't: he's stable, he had a family, he was settled, comfortable, hard-working, charming, sociable—and utterly and totally unscrupulous. That was the way we felt we could bring out the evil in Jack Lint." De Niro still wanted a part in the film after being denied the Lint role, so Gilliam offered him the smaller role of Tuttle.

According to Katherine Helmond, Gilliam called her and said, "I have a part for you, and I want you to come over and do it, but you're not going to look very nice in it." The make-up was applied by Gilliam's wife, Maggie. During production, Helmond spent ten hours a day with a mask glued to her face; her scenes had to be postponed due to the blisters this caused.

Gilliam's first choice for the part of Jill Layton was Ellen Barkin; also considered were Jamie Lee Curtis, Rebecca De Mornay, Rae Dawn Chong, Joanna Pacuła, Rosanna Arquette, Kelly McGillis and Madonna. Gilliam was reportedly dissatisfied with Kim Greist's performance and chose to cut or edit some of her scenes as a result.

=== Production design ===
Logo of the Ministry of Information

Michael Atkinson of The Village Voice wrote, "Gilliam understood that all futuristic films end up quaintly evoking the naïve past in which they were made, and turned the principle into a coherent comic aesthetic."

In the second version of the script, Gilliam and Alverson described the film's setting: "It is neither future nor past, and yet a bit of each. It is neither East nor West, but could be Belgrade or Scunthorpe on a drizzly day in February. Or Cicero, Illinois, seen through the bottom of a beer bottle." In the 1988 documentary The Birth of Brazil, Gilliam said that he always explained the film as taking place "everywhere in the 20th century, whatever that means, on the Los Angeles/Belfast border, whatever that means". Pneumatic tubes are a frequent sight throughout the film.

The result is an anachronistic technology, "a view of what the 1980s might have looked like as viewed from the perspective of a 1940s filmmaker" that has been dubbed "retro-futurism" by fellow filmmakers Jean-Pierre Jeunet and Marc Caro. It is a mixture of styles and production designs derived from Fritz Lang's films (particularly Metropolis and M) or film noir pictures starring Humphrey Bogart: "On the other hand, Sam's reality has a '40s noir feel. Some sequences are shot to recall images of Humphrey Bogart on the hunt and one character (Harvey Lime) may be named as an homage to The Third Man's Harry Lime."

A number of reviewers also saw a distinct influence of German Expressionism, as the 1920s seminal, more nightmarish, predecessor to 1940s film noir, in general in how Gilliam made use of lighting and set designs. A brief sequence towards the end, in which resistance fighters flee from government soldiers on the steps of the Ministry, pays homage to the Odessa Steps sequence in Sergei Eisenstein's Battleship Potemkin (1925). Strong references exist to the overcomplicated humoristic machinery of British illustrator W. Heath Robinson, published between 1915 and 1942. The grotesque sets were based on George Grosz's paintings of 1920s Berlin.

The lighting and set design was coupled with Gilliam's trademark obsession for very wide lenses and tilted camera angles; going unusually wide for an audience familiar with mainstream Hollywood productions, Gilliam made the film's wide-angle shots with 14mm (Zeiss), 11mm and 9.8mm (Kinoptik) lenses, the latter being a recent technological innovation as one of the first lenses of that short a focal length that did not fisheye. In fact, over the years, the 14mm lens has become informally known as "The Gilliam" among filmmakers due to the director's frequent use of it since Brazil.

Many of the film's exterior scenes were filmed in Les Espaces d'Abraxas in Noisy-le-Grand near Paris, a monumental apartment complex designed by Ricardo Bofill Taller de Arquitectura.

The numbering of form 27B/6, without which no work can be performed by repairmen with the Department of Central Services, is an allusion to George Orwell's flat at 27B Canonbury Square, London (up six half-flights of stairs), where he lived while writing parts of Nineteen Eighty-Four.

Principal photography lasted between November 1983 to August 1984.

=== Music ===
Geoff Muldaur performed a version of Ary Barroso's most famous 1939 song "Aquarela do Brasil" ("Watercolor of Brazil", often simply called "Brazil" in English). The song is a musical ode to the Brazilian motherland. Michael Kamen uses the song as a leitmotif in the film, although other background music is also used. Kamen's arrangement and orchestration of Barroso's song for Brazil made it more pliable to late 20th-century tastes, to the extent that film trailer composers often used it in contexts that had little to do with Brazil and more to do with Gilliam's dystopian vision.

Kamen, who scored the film, originally recorded "Brazil" with vocals by Kate Bush. This recording was not included in the film nor on the original soundtrack release. However, it has been subsequently released on re-releases of the soundtrack. Gilliam recalls drawing the inspiration to use the song while in Port Talbot, Wales in 1977:

This place was a métallurgie city, where everything was covered by a gray metallic dust... Even the beach was completely covered by dust, it was really dusky. The sun was going down and was very beautiful. The contrast was extraordinary. I had this image of a man sitting there in this sordid beach with a portable radio, tuned in those strange escapist Latin songs like Brazil. The music took him away somehow and made the world seem less blue to him.

Sylvia Albertazzi, in her article "Salman Rushdie's 'The Location of Brazil': The Imaginary Homelands of the Fantastic Literature", stresses even further the importance that the soundtrack had on the movie's plot and meaning. She suggests, "... the opening question 'where is Gilliam's Brazil?', may be answered, quite literally, 'in a song'; just as it is in a song that there is to be found that world where 'all fall down' in children's games."

== Release ==
The film was produced by Arnon Milchan's company Embassy International Pictures. Gilliam's original cut of the film was 142 minutes long and ends on a dark note. This version was released in Europe and internationally by 20th Century Fox without issue. However, the film's US distribution was handled by Universal Pictures, whose executives felt that the ending tested poorly. Universal's chairman, Sid Sheinberg, insisted on a dramatic re-edit of the film to give it a happy ending and suggested testing both versions to see which scored higher. At one point, there were two editing teams working on the film, one without Gilliam's knowledge. After a lengthy delay with no sign of the film being released, Gilliam took out a full-page ad in Variety urging Sheinberg to release Brazil in its intended version. Sheinberg spoke publicly in interviews of his dispute with Gilliam, and ran his own advertisement in Daily Variety offering to sell the film.

Gilliam conducted private screenings of Brazil (without the studio's approval) for film schools and local critics. On the same night when Universal's award contender Out of Africa premiered in New York, Brazil was awarded the awards for "Best Picture", "Best Screenplay" and "Best Director" at the Los Angeles Film Critics Association. This prompted Universal to finally agree to release a modified 132-minute version supervised by Gilliam in 1985.

== Reception ==
On the review aggregator website Rotten Tomatoes, 98% of 65 critics' reviews are positive, with an average rating of 9.1/10. The website's consensus reads: "Brazil, Terry Gilliam's visionary Orwellian fantasy, is an audacious dark comedy, filled with strange, imaginative visuals." On Metacritic, the film received a score of 84 based on 18 reviews, indicating "universal acclaim".

Los Angeles Times critic Kenneth Turan described the film as "the most potent piece of satiric political cinema since Dr. Strangelove".

Janet Maslin of The New York Times was very positive towards the film on its release, stating, "Terry Gilliam's Brazil, a jaunty, wittily observed vision of an extremely bleak future, is a superb example of the power of comedy to underscore serious ideas, even solemn ones."

Roger Ebert was less enthusiastic in the Chicago Sun-Times, giving the film two stars out of four and claiming that it was "hard to follow". He felt that the film lacked a confident grasp on its characters' roles in a story "awash in elaborate special effects, sensational sets, apocalyptic scenes of destruction and a general lack of discipline". However, Ebert did say that "there are several scenes in Brazil that show a lot of imagination and effort". Ebert especially enjoyed one scene in which "Sam moves into half an office and finds himself engaged in a tug-of-war over his desk with the man through the wall. I was reminded of a Chaplin film, Modern Times, and reminded, too, that in Chaplin economy and simplicity were virtues, not the enemy."

Colin Greenland reviewed Brazil for Imagine magazine, and stated that it was "a daring, exorbitant Vision, sombrely funny and darkly true".

According to Gilliam in an interview with Clive James in his online programme Talking in the Library, Brazil is—to his surprise—apparently a favourite film of the far right in America.

=== Accolades ===
In 2004, Total Film named Brazil the 20th-greatest British movie of all time. In 2005, Time film reviewers Richard Corliss and Richard Schickel included Brazil in an unordered list of the 100 best films of all time. In 2006, Channel 4 voted Brazil one of the "50 Films to See Before You Die", shortly before its broadcast on FilmFour. The film also ranks at number 83 in Empire magazine's list of the "500 Greatest Films of All Time".

Wired ranked Brazil at number 5 in its list of the top 20 sci-fi movies.

Entertainment Weekly listed Brazil as the sixth-best science-fiction piece of media released since 1982. The magazine also ranked the film number 13 on its list of "The Top 50 Cult Films".

The film was nominated for two Academy Awards, for Best Original Screenplay and Best Art Direction (Norman Garwood, Maggie Gray). In 2016, the Directors Guild of America ranked the film 70th on its list of The 80 Best-Directed Films since the Guild’s founding in 1936.

=== Home media ===
A directors' cut of Brazil was released on LaserDisc in the United States in December 1993. It was released by The Criterion Collection as a five-disc LaserDisc set in 1996 and a three-disc DVD set in 1999, featuring the 142-minute cut of the film (referred to by Gilliam as the "fifth and final cut"), Sheinberg's 94-minute "Love Conquers All" cut for syndicated television, and various galleries and featurettes. Criterion also released a one-disc, movie-only DVD edition in 2006, while the three-disc set was revised to be compatible with widescreen televisions.

A Blu-ray of the 132-minute US version was released on 12 July 2011 by Universal Pictures. It contains only that version of the film and no extra features. The 142-minute cut was released on Ultra HD Blu-ray and a remastered Blu-ray by Criterion on 4 June 2025.

== Influence ==
=== Film ===
Other films that have drawn inspiration from Brazil's cinematography, art design and overall atmosphere include Jean-Pierre Jeunet's and Marc Caro's films Delicatessen (1991) and The City of Lost Children (1995), Rocky Morton and Annabel Jankel's Super Mario Bros. (1993), the Coen brothers' The Hudsucker Proxy (1994) and Alex Proyas's Dark City (1998).

The production design and lighting style of Tim Burton's Batman (1989) have been compared to Brazil. Tim Burton and production designer Anton Furst studied Brazil as a reference for Batman.

The technological aesthetics of Brazil inspired the set design of Max Cohen's apartment in the film Pi. Brazil also served as an inspiration for the film Sucker Punch (2011), and has been recognised as an inspiration for writers and artists of the steampunk subculture.

The ending of Neil Marshall's The Descent (2005) is inspired by Brazil's, as Marshall explained in an interview:

The original ending for Brazil was a massive inspiration for the original ending of The Descent – the idea that someone can go insane on the outside, but inside they've found happiness.

Jupiter Ascending (2015) features a scene that is deliberately designed to resemble the bureaucracy in Brazil, featuring Terry Gilliam in a cameo role and a reference to a "statute 27B-stroke-6".

Star Wars: The Last Jedi (2017) was also influenced by Brazil, both in its production design and its themes. Director Rian Johnson used it as inspiration for the scene in which BB-8 fixes Poe Dameron's X-Wing. The planet of Canto Bight is aesthetically similar to Brazil. Both films also share several themes, showing the ambivalence of the wealthy in the face of a world falling apart and a society unaware of the conflict surrounding them. A direct reference to the film can be heard when Finn and Rose are arrested for Parking Violation 27B/6, a nod to form 27B/6, without which no work can be done by repairmen of the Department of Public Works.

=== Television ===
Production design of the Time Variance Authority depicted in the Disney+ series Loki is inspired by the "fun sci-fi bureaucracy" and dystopian design elements of Brazil's Ministry of Information.

In the Rick and Morty episode "The Ricklantis Mixup", the ending of Brazil is referred to through a subplot involving a character who is attempting to escape. Like Lowry, is captured but lives with the illusion that he has escaped.

In the Futurama episode "How Hermes Requisitioned His Groove Back", Matt Groening and others in the DVD audio commentary cite Brazil as having influenced the depiction of the Central Bureaucracy.

=== Video games ===
The 2018 dystopian video game We Happy Few was largely inspired by Brazil.

== See also ==
- BFI Top 100 British films
- List of cult films
- List of films featuring surveillance
- List of films cut over the director's opposition
