= East of Ipswich =

- John Nettleton, Pat Heywood and Edward Rawle-Hicks in East of Ipswich
- Written by: Michael Palin
- Directed by: Tristram Powell
- Music by: George Fenton
- Country of origin: United Kingdom
- Original language: English

Production
- Producer: Innes Lloyd
- Cinematography: Nat Crosby
- Editor: Ken Pearce
- Running time: 75 minutes
- Production company: BBC

Original release
- Network: BBC
- Release: 1 February 1987

East of Ipswich is a BBC television drama from 1987 written by Michael Palin, based on his own memories of dreary holidays in English coastal towns in the 1950s. It is the story of the rite of passage of 17-year-old Richard Burrill and is based on Palin's own first meeting with his wife.

== Plot ==
Sitting in deck-chairs and touring churches is not the holiday 17-year-old Richard wants, but his parents insist on taking him. They are staying at the Tregarron guesthouse in the (fictional) seaside town of Easton in Suffolk. This traditional English boarding house is owned and run by the formidable Miss Wilbraham. Meals are served according to a very strict schedule and are very simple.

On arrival, Richard befriends Edwin, who is girl-crazy and takes Richard under his wing. In search of girls, Richard and Edwin attend a beach service organised by the local church youth group. After the type of evening one might expect at such a gathering, they enjoy a brief tryst with the twin daughters of the minister.

The following evening another visitor, Julia, agrees to a date with Edwin but only on condition that Anna, her Dutch foreign exchange student friend, can join them. Edwin persuades Richard to join them to make up a foursome. Escaping from his parents on the pretence that the quartet are heading to the youth group's Sausage Sizzle, Richard and his friends visit a local jazz club instead.

Anna attempts to sneak away with some local bikers and Richard gives chase. As Anna rides away on the back of one biker's machine, Richard jumps on the other. The bikes race off into the sand dunes; where Richard and Anna fall off the pillions and into each other's arms. Richard is annoyed but Anna finds the whole affair amusing. Reaching for a handkerchief to clean a cut on his head, Richard also pulls out a condom that he has taken from Edwin's room.

Julia and Edwin, meanwhile, have been to fetch help. Julia's father, Richard's parents and the minister from the youth group set off to rescue Richard and Anna. A lady walking her dog along the beach stumbles across Richard and Anna as it becomes clear that Richard has experienced sexual initiation. The parents and the minister round the corner just in time to catch the teenagers in flagrante delicto.

Both families make excuses to end their holidays early and head for home.

== Production ==
The film was written by Michael Palin and directed by Tristram Powell as part of the BBC's Screen Two series. The series was commissioned as an anthology drama series to replace the Play for Today, and ran for five series. East of Ipswich was the fifth of fifteen episodes in the third series, and was first aired on 1 February 1987. It was produced by Innes Lloyd with original music by George Fenton. Other musical contributions came from the Sole Bay Jazz Band and the Southwold & Reydon Corps of Drums. Palin has described the film as the happiest and least complicated creative project in which he has ever been involved.

The story was filmed in and around the town of Southwold, Suffolk, UK.

== Cast ==
- Edward Rawle-Hicks as Richard Burrill
- John Nettleton as Mr Burrill
- Pat Heywood as Mrs Burrill
- Oona Kirsch as Julia Horrobin
- Pippa Hinchley as Anna
- Allan Cuthbertson as Mr Horrobin
- Rosemary Macvie as Mrs Horrobin
- Joan Sanderson as Miss Wilbraham
- Janine Duvitski as Betty, the maid
- Graham Crowden as Richard's Headmaster
- Timothy Bateson as Mr Macklin
- John Wagland as Edwin Macklin
- Stuart Mansfield as Keith Macklin
- Charles McKeown as Mr Hargreaves
- Sheila Fearn as Mrs Hargreaves
- Roger Brierley as Revd. Phelps
- Michelle Jordan as Rebecca Phelps
- Jaynee Jordan as Rachel Phelps
- Tip Tipping as First Biker
- Wayne Michaels as Second Biker
- June Ellis as Dancing Teacher
- Phyllida Hewat as Mrs Argonaut
- Warren Saire as Ice Cream Assistant
