= Keith Hodiak =

Guyanese born British actor and dancer (1950–2025)

- Born: 16 June 1950; Georgetown, Guyana
- Died: 3 September 2025 (aged 75)
- Occupations: Actor, dancer
- Years active: 1978–1992
- Notable work: Raston robot in Doctor Who (1983)

Hodiak Hampden Sears (16 June 1950 – 3 September 2025), better known as Keith Hodiak was a Guyanese-born British actor and dancer who was active in British television and film between 1978 and 1992.

== Life and career ==
Hodiak Hampden Sears was born in Georgetown, Guyana, on 16 June 1950. Emigrating to the UK in 1960, he became interested in dance when Lee Edwards visited his school in Stoke Newington to work with pupils to put together performance shows. After encouragement from Edwards, Hodiak was awarded a scholarship to train at Arts Educational Schools. This was followed by spending a year working in Germany before joining Ballet Rambert from 1972 to 1975, at the time under director Norman Morrice.

His acting debut came in 1978, when he took on the role of Sam Spade in Revenge of the Pink Panther. In 1983, he played the part of the Raston Warrior Robot in the 20th anniversary special of Doctor Who – "The Five Doctors". In 1985, he appeared in three episodes of Are You Being Served? during the programme's final year on air. He played one of Aslan's two satyrs in the BBC's adaptation of The Lion, the Witch and the Wardrobe in 1988. He briefly appeared in EastEnders in 1992, but gave up acting to become an adult ballet class instructor and yoga teacher, working notably at Pineapple Dance Studios.

Hodiak died on 3 September 2025, at the age of 75. His death was not announced until April 2026.

== Filmography ==
Year	Title	Role	Notes
1978	Revenge of the Pink Panther	Sam Spade and the Private Eyes #3	
1980	Dr. Jekyll and Mr. Hyde	Kangaroo	TV movie
1981	The Chinese Detective	Club Member	Episode: Hammer and Nails
1981	An American Werewolf in London	Assorted Police	
1983	Doctor Who	Raston Warrior Robot	Episode: "The Five Doctors"
1985	Are You Being Served?	Seymour	3 episodes
1985	The Bill	Mr. Welsh	Episode: Lost
1987	Full Metal Jacket	Daddy D.A.	
1988	The Lion, the Witch and the Wardrobe	Aslan's Satyr	Miniseries
1992	EastEnders	Cecil	1 episode
