= Charles McKeown =

British actor and screenwriter

- Born: 1946 (age 79–80)
- Occupations: Actor, screenwriter

Charles McKeown (/məˈkjuːən/ mə-KEW-ən; born 1946) is a British actor and writer, perhaps best known for his collaborations with Terry Gilliam. The two met while shooting Monty Python's Life of Brian (1979), and further collaborated with the Monty Python team in Ripping Yarns (1977), Fawlty Towers (1979), Time Bandits (1981), The Missionary (1982), A Private Function (1984), Brazil (1985), East of Ipswich (1987), The Adventures of Baron Munchausen (1988), The Imaginarium of Doctor Parnassus (2009), Erik the Viking (1989), and American Friends (1991). Other credits include Yes Minister (1980), The Hitchhiker's Guide to the Galaxy (1981), Prick Up Your Ears (1987), and The Young Indiana Jones Chronicles (1992).

== Early life and career ==
Charles McKeown studied acting at the Bristol Old Vic Theatre School.

=== Acting ===
McKeown has had a number of appearances in films and television series associated with the Monty Python comedy group. He started off his career with minor roles on Ripping Yarns (1977), which starred Michael Palin and Terry Jones, and Fawlty Towers (1979), which starred John Cleese. Around the same time, he played some minor roles in Life of Brian, where he met Gilliam.

Since then, he has had acting roles in a number of the films he helped to write with Gilliam, including an appearance as Harvey Lime in Brazil and as Adolphus and Rupert in The Adventures of Baron Munchausen. In addition, he had roles in other Python-associated films such as Time Bandits (1981), The Missionary (1982), A Private Function (1984), East of Ipswich (1987), Erik the Viking (1989), and American Friends (1991).

McKeown has also made some film appearances not associated with the Monty Python troupe such as his minor role as Jerry Hadley in Spies Like Us (1985), (although Terry Gilliam also had a small role in that film) (1985), and Mr. Cunliffe in Prick Up Your Ears (1987).

McKeown has also appeared on numerous television series including: Yes Minister (1980), The Hitchhiker's Guide to the Galaxy (1981), Pinkerton's Progress (1983 which he also wrote for) and The Young Indiana Jones Chronicles (1992).

=== Screenwriting ===
McKeown co-wrote the screenplay for Brazil (1985) with Gilliam and Tom Stoppard, for which they were collectively nominated for an Academy Award. McKeown also co-wrote the screenplay for The Adventures of Baron Munchausen (1988) with Gilliam. After nearly twenty years apart, the two collaborated again on the screenplay for The Imaginarium of Doctor Parnassus (2009). Additionally, McKeown wrote the BBC sitcom, Hold the Sunset.

He went uncredited for his work on Batman (1989), but other notable screenwriting credits include Plunkett & Macleane (1999), and Ripley's Game (2002),
