= Richard Dempsey =

English actor

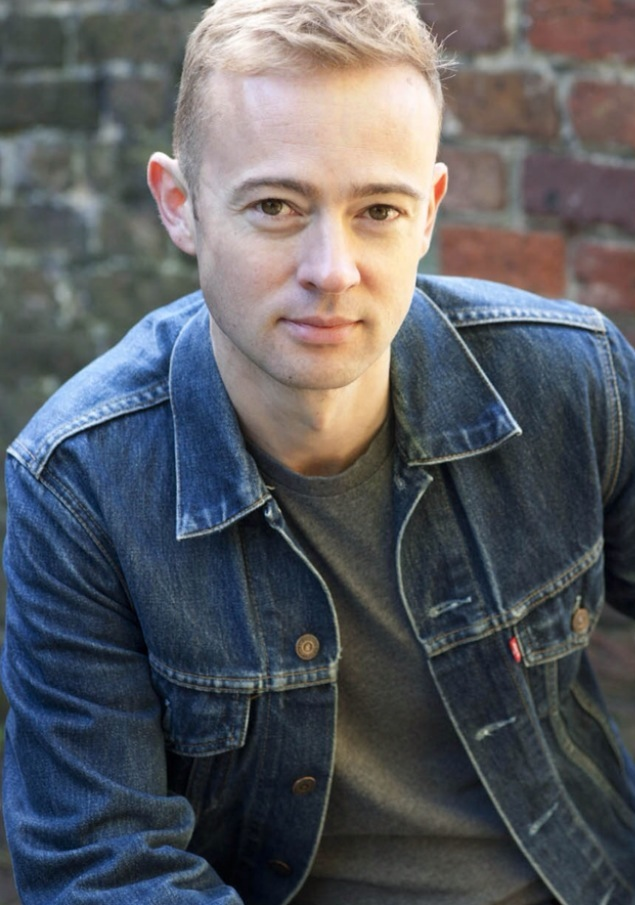
- Born: Welwyn Garden City, Hertfordshire, England
- Occupations: Actor, singer
- Years active: 1988–present

Richard Dempsey is an English actor.

== Career ==
Dempsey's first role came at the age of 15, when he appeared as Peter Pevensie in the BBC's adaptation of The Lion, the Witch and the Wardrobe in 1988. The following year, he appeared in the adaptation of Prince Caspian and the Voyage of the Dawn Treader. His subsequent TV appearances have included Doc Martin, Dracula, Sherlock Holmes (The Last Vampyre), Crime Traveller, Island at War and Egypt.

He made his professional stage debut in the role of Jack in the original London production of the musical Into the Woods with music and lyrics by Stephen Sondheim at The Phoenix Theatre. After training at the Guildhall School of Music and Drama he starred as Nick Piazza in the original cast of West End musical Fame and played Ugly in the original UK production of Honk! He has since performed in a variety of roles in television, film and on stage with the Royal Shakespeare Company, the Royal National Theatre, Michael Grandage Company, Frantic Assembly and Propeller. In the Michael Grandage West End production of A Midsummer Night's Dream, he played Peter Quince. In the 2015 London revival of TS Eliot's The Cocktail Party he played Edward Chamberlain, directed by Abby Wright. In 2022, Dempsey appeared as Nicholas II of Russia in Doctor Who and as Paul Crouch in the world premiere, at London's Almeida Theatre, of the musical Tammy Faye, written by Elton John, Jake Shears, and James Graham.

== Filmography ==
=== Film ===
Year	Title	Role	Notes
1994	Prince of Jutland	Sigurd	
1998	The Barber of Siberia	The stutterer	
2000	24 Hours in London	Olly Walsh	
2016	Genius	Director	
2019	1917	Mackenzie Officer	
2022	My Policeman	Librarian	

=== Television ===
Year	Title	Role	Notes
1988–89	The Chronicles of Narnia	Peter Pevensie	8 episodes
1991	Tonight at 8.30	Alf / Mr Burnham	2 episodes
1993	The Good Guys	Dominic	Episode: "Old School Ties"
1993	Anna Lee	Sam Tulloch	TV movie
1993	The Case-Book of Sherlock Holmes	Jack Ferguson	Episode: "The Last Vampyre"
1993	Don't Leave Me This Way	Felix Neil	TV movie
1994	The Inspector Alleyn Mysteries	Patrick	Episode: "Dead Water"
1995	Wycliffe	James Coryn	Episode: "Lost Contact"
1997	Student Prince	Sebastian	TV movie
1997	Crime Traveller	Nicky Robson	8 episodes
1999	Scarlet Pimpernel	Comte de Claris de Florian	TV mini-series
1999	Tilly Trotter	Harry Sopwith	TV mini-series, 2 episodes
1999	Aristocrats	Lord Beaufield	TV mini-series
1999	Wives and Daughters	Mr Bold	TV mini-series
2003–11	Doctors	Gareth Appleton	32 episodes
2004	Island at War	Eugene La Salle	
2005	Egypt	William Beechey	TV mini-series, Episode: "The Temple of the Sands"
2005	Peter Warlock, Some Little Joy	Moeran	TV movie
2013	Doc Martin	Colin Westmore	Episode: Departure
2013	Downton Abbey	Footman	Season 4, Episode 8
2013	Dracula	Dewhurst	Episode: "Of Monsters and Men"
2022	Doctor Who	Nicholas II	Episode: "The Power of the Doctor"

=== Theatre Credits ===
Year	Title	Role	Theatre	Location	Notes
1990-91	Into the Woods	Jack	Phoenix Theatre	West End	Musical
1993	Honk!	Ugly	Stephen Joseph Theatre	Scarborough	Musical
1995-96	Fame	Nick Piazza	Cambridge Theatre	West End	Musical
1999	Honk!	Ugly	Royal National Theatre	UK National Tour	Musical
2004-05	Dirty Dancing	Neil Kellerman	Aldwych Theatre	West End	Musical
2005	Just So	Elephant's Child	Chichester Festival Theatre	Chichester	Musical
2006	Me and My Girl	Hon Gerald	Sheffield Crucible	Sheffield	Musical
2006-07	Citizenship	De Clerk	Royal National Theatre	London	Play
2009-10	Strictly Ballroom	The Compère	Prince of Wales Theatre	Toronto	Musical
2010-11	A Midsummer Night's Dream	Titania	—N/a	UK & International Tour	Play
2011-12	The Merchant of Venice	Lorenzo	—N/a	UK & International Tour	Play
2012	Victor/Victoria	Toddy	Southwark Playhouse	London	Play
2012	A Midsummer Night's Dream	Peter Quince	Noël Coward Theatre	West End	Play
2013-14	Charlie and the Chocolate Factory	Mr Bucket / Understudy Willy Wonka	Theatre Royal Drury Lane	West End	Musical
2015	The Cocktail Party	Edward Chamberlain	The Coronet	Off-West End	Play
2015	A Damsel in Distress	Reggie	Chichester Festival Theatre	Chichester	Play
2018	A Winter's Tale	Hermoine	Hampstead Theatre / Tour	London & Asia Tour	Play
2019	Don Quixote	Duke/Don Quixote	Royal Shakespeare Company	West End	Play
2021-22	A Christmas Carol	Bob Cratchit	Middle Temple	London	Musical
2022	Tammy Faye	Paul Crouch	Almeida Theatre	London	Musical
2024	Made in Dagenham	Mr Hopkins	London Palladium	West End	Musical
