= Sophie Wilcox =

English actress (born 1975)

- Born: Sophie Elizabeth Wilcox; 2 January 1975 (age 51); Croydon, London, England
- Occupation: Actress

Sophie Elizabeth Wilcox (born 2 January 1975) is an English actress who is most notable for appearing in the BBC miniseries adaptation of The Chronicles of Narnia as Lucy Pevensie when she was 13 years old. She appeared in The Lion, the Witch and the Wardrobe in 1988, as well as its sequel Prince Caspian and the Voyage of the Dawn Treader in 1989, but has only appeared in a small number of acting roles since.

After a more than decade-long absence from acting, Wilcox returned to the screen with a small role in the film Gangster Kittens.

== Filmography ==
- 1988: The Lion, the Witch and the Wardrobe
- 1989: Prince Caspian and the Voyage of the Dawn Treader
- 1999: Mr. Ma & Son
- 1999: Forgotten
- 2001: Dark Blue World (Tmavomodrý svet)
- 2016: Gangster Kittens
