= The Lion, the Witch and the Wardrobe (1988 TV serial) =

1988 British children's television series

- Written by: C.S. Lewis; Alan Seymour
- Directed by: Marilyn Fox
- Starring: Richard Dempsey; Sophie Cook; Jonathan R. Scott; Sophie Wilcox
- Composer: Geoffrey Burgon
- Country of origin: United Kingdom
- No. of series: 1
- No. of episodes: 6

Production
- Producer: Paul Stone
- Production locations: Manorbier Castle, Wales
- Running time: 172 minutes

Original release
- Network: BBC; Wonderworks; PBS
- Release: 13 November – 18 December 1988

Related
- Prince Caspian and The Voyage of the Dawn Treader; The Chronicles of Narnia

The Lion, the Witch and the Wardrobe is a British children's television drama first broadcast by the BBC in 1988. It was the first series of The Chronicles of Narnia that ran from 1988 to 1990.

== Plot ==
In 1940, Peter, Susan, Edmund and Lucy are evacuated to live with Professor Kirke in the English countryside. Lucy, the youngest, soon discovers a magical country called Narnia in the back of a wardrobe. Narnia has been placed in an eternal winter with no Christmas by the evil White Witch. Lucy befriends a faun named Mr. Tumnus, a reluctant servant of the Witch. Though initially intending to hand Lucy over to the White Witch, Mr. Tumnus lets Lucy go. Peter, Susan and Edmund do not believe Lucy when she tells them of Narnia.

A few days later, whilst following Lucy, Edmund also enters Narnia where he meets the White Witch, who calls herself the Queen of Narnia. Lucy is delighted to realise that Edmund has also found Narnia (not knowing he has befriended the White Witch), though Edmund cruelly tells Peter and Susan that he and Lucy were only pretending. The Professor, however, is convinced that Lucy is telling the truth. When the four children enter Narnia together, they learn that Mr. Tumnus has been arrested by the Witch’s secret police for previously letting Lucy go. The children meet Mr. and Mrs. Beaver who tell them that the great lion, Aslan, has returned to free Narnia of the Witch’s tyranny by crowing the four children as the new monarchs at Cair Paravel.

Edmund secretly goes to meet the White Witch, having been tricked into betraying his siblings to her. Knowing that Edmund has betrayed them, the Beavers and Edmund’s siblings journey to the stone table to seek Aslan’s help. Along the way, they meet Father Christmas, a sign of Aslan’s return and the Witch’s power weakening. The eternal winter also melts into spring. At the Stone Table, Aslan welcomes the Beavers, Peter, Susan and Lucy and learns that Edmund is with the White Witch. Edmund is rescued by Aslan’s followers before the Witch can kill him as a traitor. The next morning, the Witch approaches Aslan and demands her right to kill Edmund, as per the deep magic which states that all traitors belong to her. Aslan persuades her to not do so. That evening, after moving his army away, Aslan travels to the Stone Table accompanied by Susan and Lucy. As Susan and Lucy hide, they witness Aslan being bound to the table by the Witch’s army. It is revealed that Aslan agreed to sacrifice himself to save Edmund from death. The following morning, however, Aslan is resurrected due to a deeper magic which states that when an innocent victim is killed in place of a traitor, death will be reversed, restoring the innocent victim. Aslan brings Susan and Lucy to restore all the Narnians turned to stone in the Witch’s castle.

The Witch leads her followers into battle against Aslan’s army. Edmund gets wounded when he destroys the Witch’s wand. Aslan arrives with the Narnians he rescued and kills the Witch himself. Edmund and the other injured members of Aslan’s army are restored by Lucy’s magical cordial. The next day, Aslan brings his followers to Cair Paravel where he crowns the Pevensies as the new rulers before leaving to attend to other countries.

Years later, the four Pevensies find themselves back in the Professor’s house as children again. They realise no time has gone by on Earth. The Professor believes their story, whilst confirming they will return to Narnia someday.

== Cast ==
- Richard Dempsey as Peter Pevensie
- Sophie Cook as Susan Pevensie
- Jonathan R. Scott as Edmund Pevensie
- Sophie Wilcox as Lucy Pevensie
- Maureen Morris as Mrs. Macready
- Michael Aldridge as The Professor
- Jeffrey Perry as Mr. Tumnus
- Ailsa Berk and William Todd-Jones (puppet performance) and Ronald Pickup (voice) as Aslan
- Big Mick as Little Man
- Barbara Kellerman as The White Witch
- Martin Stone as Maugrim
- Kerry Shale as Mr. Beaver
- Lesley Nicol as Mrs. Beaver
- Bert Parnaby as Father Christmas
- Hamish Kerr as Fox
- Jill Goldston as Young Squirrel
- Keith Hodiak and Garfield Brown as Aslan's Satyrs
- Irene Marot and Kairen Kemp as Hags
- Ken Kitson as Giant Rumblebuffin
- Christopher Bramwell as Peter as an adult
- Suzanne Debney as Susan as an adult
- Charles Ponting as Edmund as an adult
- Juliet Waley as Lucy as an adult

== Episodes ==
No.	Original release date
1	13 November 1988
In the summer of 1940, Peter, Susan, Edmund and Lucy Pevensie are evacuated from London to the countryside to live at the grand country house of elderly Professor Digory Kirke. The siblings explore the house soon after their arrival. Lucy looks inside a wardrobe in a spare room. On entering it, she finds herself in the snowy land of Narnia where she meets a faun called Mr. Tumnus, who invites her back to his cave for tea. However, Mr. Tumnus soon reveals to Lucy that he has in the pay of the White Witch, who has made it always winter but never Christmas, and ordered him to hand over any humans to her. The faun realises he cannot go ahead with this, and at his own risk, shows Lucy the way home. Lucy returns home and tells her siblings about Narnia but they find nothing when they look in the wardrobe, leading them to believe she is having a joke with them. A few days later, during a game of hide and seek, Edmund follows Lucy into the wardrobe and finds out for himself that her story was true - he too has entered Narnia. Edmund passes the lamp post where Lucy had met Mr Tumnus, and advances deeper into the forest in his search for Lucy, but he is unable to find her. He then hears sleigh bells, and a horse-drawn sleigh appears, driven by a dwarf and carrying a grand white-skinned lady.
2	20 November 1988
The lady introduces herself as the Queen of Narnia. When she learns Edmund is a son of Adam (human), she gives him a hot drink and turkish delight. In conversation, she learns that he has three siblings (a brother and two sisters), and that one of them has already been in Narnia and met a faun. The Queen seems rather alarmed when she hears about all of this. Edmund agrees to bring his siblings to meet the Queen, tempted by the offer of more turkish delight and the chance to be king of Narnia. The Queen then departs and Edmund makes his way back towards the lamp post. Lucy then excitedly appears and tells Edmund that she has been back to see Mr. Tumnus, and that the White Witch has done nothing to him for letting her go. Lucy then describes the White Witch’s appearance, and Edmund realises that she is none other than the “Queen of Narnia” he has just befriended, but does not mention that he has met her. Lucy tells Peter and Susan that she has been back in Narnia and that Edmund has also been there, but Edmund lies by saying that he and Lucy were playing a game, angering Peter and Susan - who still disbelieve Lucy, but are angry with Edmund for “encouraging” her with her story. The professor, however, attempts to convince them that Lucy could be telling the truth, after they mention that Lucy had always been the more truthful of the two siblings, and he dismisses the suggestion that Lucy might be suffering from madness. Peter later tells Edmund to put a stop to his behaviour towards Lucy, while Susan adds that they should all keep away from the spare room and the wardrobe. Soon afterwards, however, the four children encounter the professor's housekeeper Mrs Macready when she is showing a group of visitors around the house, and hide in the wardrobe to avoid her. They then find themselves in Narnia. Peter is angry when Edmund’s tongue slips and they realise that he had been in Narnia before and tried to make out that Lucy was telling lies. Lucy then takes lead and takes them to visit Mr. Tumnus, only to find that he has been captured and his cave ransacked. A note has been left behind which informs them that Mr. Tumnus is under arrest on a charge of high treason for fraternising with humans. It has been signed by Maugrim, chief of the Secret Police.
3	27 November 1988
Lucy convinces her siblings to try and save Mr. Tumnus, feeling responsible for his arrest. They move on from the cave, not knowing exactly which direction to head in. The children soon encounter Mr. Beaver, who proves to be an ally. He takes them to his dam where he and his wife provide them with dinner. They inform them that Mr. Tumnus was captured by the secret police, who were last seen taking him in the direction of the Witch's castle, where few people taken inside have ever come out again - the majority have been turned to stone. The beavers also give the children information about Aslan the lion, the true king of Narnia who is returning to Narnia to bring about the demise of the White Witch. The children learn they are part of a prophecy which states that two sons of Adam and two daughters of Eve will be crowned kings of Narnia, which will not only spell the end of the White Witch’s reign, but of her life. Lucy suddenly notices that Edmund has disappeared. Mr. Beaver informs them that there is no point in going to search for Edmund, as they already know where he’s gone - to the White Witch, having allied himself with her on his previous visit. Mr. Beaver had noticed a look in Edmund’s eyes when he first laid eyes on him, which signalled that he had met the Witch and eaten her food, and been told where she lived. The beavers realise the Witch will set out to catch them that very night, and prepare for their journey to the stone table to seek help from Aslan. Edmund arrives at the Witch's castle, where he first encounters Maugrim, who then gives him permission to enter. The Witch is furious that he came without his siblings and even more furious when she learns Aslan has arrived in Narnia. She then orders her dwarf to prepare their sledge for a journey, and to use the harness without bells - hoping to “creep up silently” and “burst upon” the beavers and Edmund’s siblings.
4	4 December 1988
The beavers and the three other children get ready for their journey, while Edmund waits with the Witch as a dwarf prepares their sleigh ready for their own journey to the Stone Table. Before they depart, the Witch sends Maugrim to kill Edmund's siblings and the beavers. However, when Maugrim and another wolf arrive, they find the children and the beavers have already left, so make their way to the stone table, as instructed by the Witch. The harshness of the Witch’s winter mean that Maugrim has no tracks to follow, and the scent is cold. The two wolves then leave to make their journey to the Stone Table. The beavers and the children make their journey through the snow, careful to stick to routes where the Witch’s sleigh would be unable to travel, and eventually reach a hiding place for a night’s rest. The next morning, the beavers and the children are awoken by the sound of jingling bells, which they mistake for the Witch’s sleigh. Mr Beaver creeps out of the hiding place to investigate, and instead is greeted by Father Christmas - a fresh sign that the Witch's power is crumbling. Peter receives a sword and shield to fight in the battle. Susan is given a horn to call for help when in danger. Lucy is given a dagger and a cordial to heal any wound. Meanwhile, Edmund and the Witch have journeyed through the night, and in the morning they encounter a party of Narnian creatures enjoying a feast. The Witch is horrified to learn that Father Christmas has been in Narnia, and turns the creatures into stone. Edmund had already realised that he had allied with the wrong side, but this event makes him realise the full extent of the Witch’s evil. The eternal winter eventually melts into spring, and the beavers and children finally reach the Stone Table and meet Aslan.
5	11 December 1988
The children and the beavers are welcomed at the stone table by Aslan and his followers (mostly dryads, dwarves and fauns). Aslan agrees to help save Edmund when he learns of his betrayal. Aslan then shows Peter a far off sight of Cair Paravel, where he is to reign as High King. Maugrim then appears and Peter slays him, being knighted by Aslan. Six of Aslan's followers (an animated pegasus, griffin, flying puma, cockatrice, eagle, and pelican) pursue the Witch’s surviving wolf to save Edmund which they do just as the Witch is about to kill him (to prevent the prophecy of Cair Paravel). Edmund reaches the Stone Table and, following a conversation with Aslan, apologises to his siblings for his mistakes. The Witch later arrives and demands her right to kill Edmund as all traitors belong to her, according to the deep magic. However, in a private conversation, Aslan persuades her to renounce her claim. He then instructs his followers to move their encampment on to the forest. He advises Peter on the battle, informing him that he cannot promise that he will be there. The atmosphere at the encampment has changed, although nobody is sure what might be happening. That night, Susan and Lucy follow Aslan out of camp, and eventually they witness the Witch and her evil followers (including minotaurs and hags) bind Aslan to the Stone Table. It is revealed that Aslan agreed to be killed in Edmund's place. The witch uses her knife to kill Aslan but not before telling him that she will kill Edmund too once Aslan is dead.
6	18 December 1988
Susan and Lucy spend the night by Aslan's body. The next morning, the stone table cracks and Aslan reveals he is alive and well, much to the relief of Susan and Lucy. Aslan tells them he was saved by a deeper magic which the Witch did not know: when a willing victim who has committed no treachery is killed in place of a traitor, death will work backwards, thus the victim’s life will be restored. Aslan brings Susan and Lucy to the Witch's castle where he restores all of the Narnians she had turned to stone, including Mr. Tumnus. They flee the castle and head for the battlefield. Meanwhile, the battle has commenced and the Witch has been turning many of Aslan’s followers into stone, while others have been wounded by her army, but Edmund brings down his sword on the Witch's wand, although she wounds him with the remains of it. Aslan arrives with the Narnians he has saved, and kills the Witch. Most of her followers are wiped out and the surviving villains flee, just after Aslan and the freed Narnians arrive. Edmund and the others injured in the battle are restored by Lucy's cordial. The next day, Aslan brings his followers to Cair Paravel where he crowns the Pevensies as rulers of Narnia. He leaves soon afterwards, much to the sadness of the Pevensies. Mr. Beaver comforts them by assuring that Aslan will come and go as he has other countries to attend to. The Pevensies rule Narnia for many years, keeping peace. Whilst travelling, they see the same lamp post they discovered when they first entered Narnia and find themselves back through the wardrobe as children again. They realise no time has gone by since they entered Narnia. They tell the professor of their adventures and he believes them.
