= Hyper-surveillance =

Form of surveillance

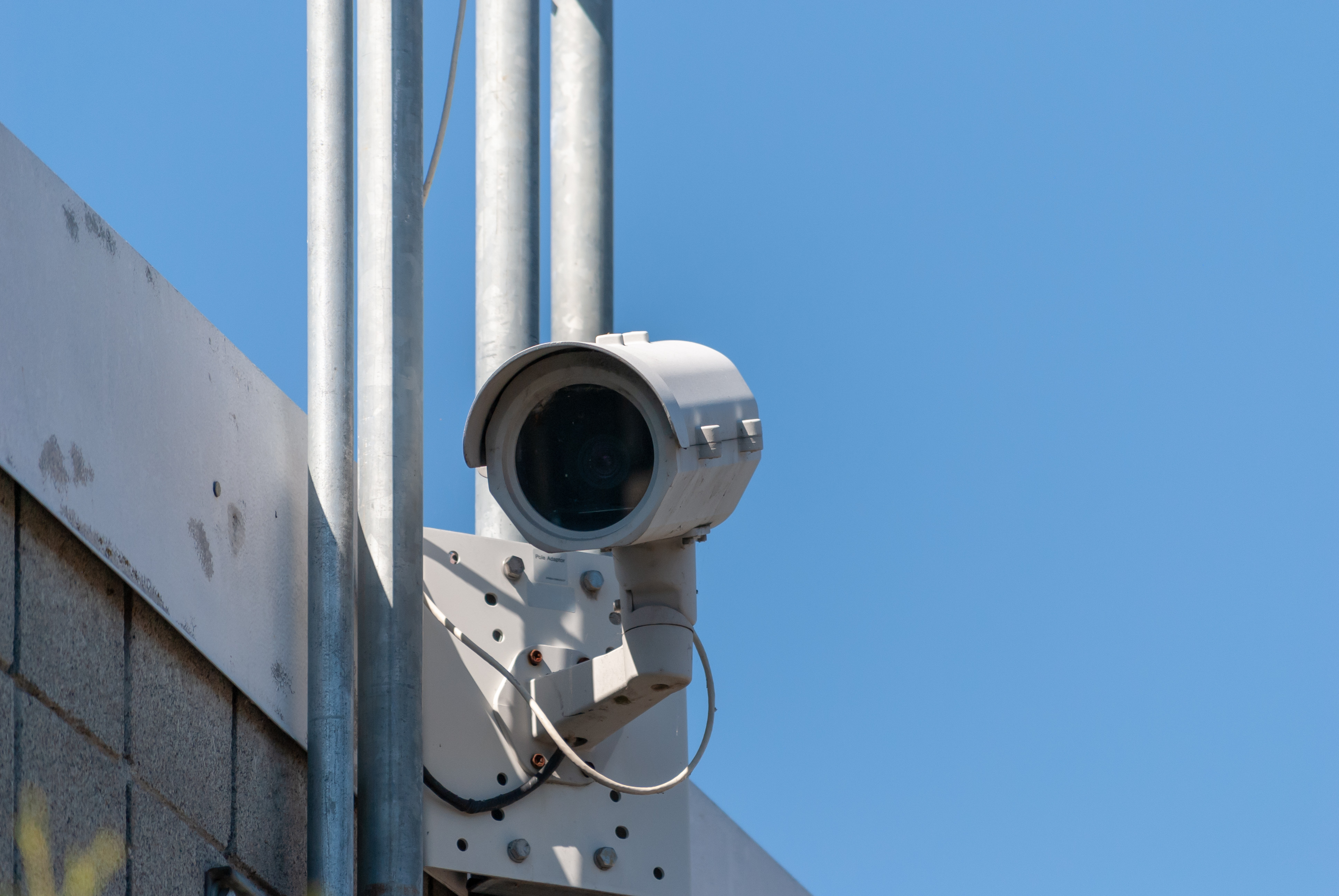
Security cameras are used in hyper surveillance schemes.

Hyper-surveillance is the intricate surveillance of an entire or a substantial fraction of a population in order to monitor that group of citizens that specifically utilizes technology and security breaches to access information. As the reliance on the internet economy grows, smarter technology with higher surveillance concerns and snooping means workers to have increased surveillance at their workplace. Hyper surveillance is highly targeted and intricate observation and monitoring among an individual, group of people, or faction.

== History ==
In the middle of the 1970s, the American penal system or prison system expanded rapidly. As a result, 1 in 35 adults are in correctional supervision nationwide. The surveillance systems has created targeted and specific supervision. The use of surveillance systems has been targeted against black and Latino men. Consequently, men of color are found to be stopped by police at higher rates. For example, in some neighborhoods, police stop over 500 out of 1000 residents in their lifetime due to hyper surveillance systems.

Hyper surveillance extends beyond the crime control agents and police system as it has been documented in schools, community organizations, and other places. Research finds that hyper surveillance can lead to targeted and specific focus on an individual leading to profiling and predictive policing.

== Technology ==
=== Facial recognition systems ===
Constructed through computer programs, facial recognition systems analyze images and biometrics of human faces for the purpose of identification. Compared to other facial systems, recognition software has been used for surveillance and security. Alongside public video cameras, they can be used in a passive structure. Therefore, facial recognition software can be used without the knowledge or consent of a person.

Practically, this technology can be used in state centers, offices, and workplaces. State departments possess photographs of constituents and utilize this information as a resource alongside public surveillance tools to create a system of identification and tracking.

=== Mobile tracking systems ===
Mobile phone tracking is a system and process that identifies the location of a mobile phone. It specifically locates the phone through radio signals or through the internal built GPS system. The technology has been used for observing objects or people on the move through specific and ordered locational processing.

== Use ==
A consumer technology that has created hyper surveillance technology is Clearview AI. Some advantages that Clearview AI possess include security and efficiency. Using the technology, law enforcement is able to detect shoplifters, sex traffickers, child abusers, or homicide cases. The software allows enforcement to a database of over three billion pictures allowing police to identify suspects efficiently. However, there are multiple potential negatives including personal abuse, racial bias, inaccurate results, and data security. With access to millions of images, law enforcement could abuse the technology to identify romantic partners or foreign governments can identify people of social status to blackmail. The availability of information makes it more difficult for individual security. In addition, Clearview AI has been proven to mistaken or misidentify suspects before. The use of facial recognition technologies have biases leading to misclassifications causing wrongful arrests. In fact, the company stated that the tool finds matches 75% of the time. Therefore, there are situations where data is inaccurate. A major concern with Clearview AI and facial recognition systems is the data security. In the past, Clearview AI has been hacked and the client base list has been leaked.
