= Jonathan Scott (actor) =

English actor

- Born: 1973 (age 52–53); England
- Other names: Jonathan R. Scott; Jonathan S Bancroft
- Occupation: Child actor

Jonathan Scott (sometimes credited as Jonathan R. Scott or Jonathan S Bancroft; born 1973) is an English former child actor most notable for his appearance as Edmund Pevensie in three of the BBC's four adaptations of the Narnia books between 1988 and 1990.

== Career ==
Scott portrayed Edmund Pevensie in 1988's The Lion, the Witch and the Wardrobe as well as 1989's Prince Caspian and The Voyage of the Dawn Treader.

He played Colin in Poirot - "The Theft of the Royal Ruby" (series 3, episode 9) in 1991.

Scott gave up acting in his late teens, his last role being in a 1993 episode of The Bill.

In 2025, he appeared with other members of the cast in a new documentary, Return to Narnia. It was included in the DVD and Blu ray box set of The Chronicles of Narnia.
