= Time Bandits =

1981 British fantasy film by Terry Gilliam

- Theatrical release poster
- Directed by: Terry Gilliam
- Written by: Terry Gilliam; Michael Palin
- Produced by: Terry Gilliam
- Starring: John Cleese; Sean Connery; Shelley Duvall; Katherine Helmond; Ian Holm; Michael Palin; Ralph Richardson; Peter Vaughan; David Warner; David Rappaport; Kenny Baker; Jack Purvis; Mike Edmonds; Tiny Ross; Craig Warnock
- Cinematography: Peter Biziou
- Edited by: Julian Doyle
- Music by: Mike Moran; Songs by George Harrison
- Production company: HandMade Films
- Distributed by: HandMade Films (Distributors) Ltd.
- Release date: 2 July 1981
- Running time: 116 minutes
- Country: United Kingdom
- Language: English
- Budget: $5 million
- Box office: $42.4 million

Time Bandits is a 1981 British fantasy adventure film co-written, produced, and directed by Terry Gilliam. It stars David Rappaport, Sean Connery, John Cleese, Shelley Duvall, Ralph Richardson, Katherine Helmond, Ian Holm, Michael Palin, Peter Vaughan, and David Warner. The film tells the story of a young boy taken on an adventure through time with a band of thieves who plunder treasure from various points in history.

In 1979, Terry Gilliam was unable to set up the film Brazil; therefore, he proposed a family film. Time Bandits was co-written with fellow Monty Python Michael Palin, financed by ex-Beatle George Harrison's HandMade Films and filmed in England, Morocco, and Wales. The film was released in cinemas on 2 July 1981 in the United Kingdom and on 6 November 1981 in the United States. On its initial release, the film received mainly positive reviews from critics; it opened at number one at the weekend box office in the US and Canada, and, by the end of its run, grossed $36 million on a budget of $5 million.

Gilliam has referred to Time Bandits as the first in his "Trilogy of Imagination", which follows a fantasist through three perspectives: as a young boy in this film, a grown man in Brazil (1985) and an old man in The Adventures of Baron Munchausen (1988).

== Plot ==
Young Kevin is fascinated by history, particularly Ancient Greece, while his parents are obsessed only with modern consumerism and buying the latest household gadgets. One night, Kevin sees an armoured knight on horseback burst out of his wardrobe, then ride off into a forest where his bedroom wall was. The room returns to normal, leaving a photo on the wall similar to the forest he saw; the next night he prepares supplies and a Polaroid camera ready for a repeat viewing, but instead six dwarfs - Fidgit, Strutter, Og, Wally, Vermin and their leader, Randall - spill out of the wardrobe. The group have stolen a map and are looking for an exit from Kevin's room before they are discovered. After they reveal a long corridor leading to a portal, Kevin hesitates to join them until the apparition of a floating, menacing head—the Supreme Being—appears, demanding the map's return.

Kevin follows the group through the portal and lands with them in Italy during the Battle of Castiglione. Kevin learns that the Supreme Being once employed the dwarfs to repair holes in the spacetime fabric, but they realised the potential to use the map of the holes to steal riches from different time periods. With Kevin's help, they visit several locations in spacetime and meet Napoleon Bonaparte and Robin Hood, while Kevin uses his camera to document their visits. However, they are unaware that their activities are being monitored by Evil, a malevolent being who can manipulate reality and is attempting to acquire the map.

Kevin becomes separated from the group and ends up in Mycenaean Greece, meeting King Agamemnon, who adopts Kevin after he inadvertently helps the king kill a Minotaur. Randall and the others soon locate Kevin and abduct him, much to his resentment, and escape through another hole to the RMS Titanic, which begins sinking. Evil manipulates the group and transports them to his realm, the Time of Legends. After surviving encounters with ogres and a giant, Kevin and the dwarfs locate the Fortress of Ultimate Darkness and are led to believe that "The Most Fabulous Object in the World" awaits them. Instead, Evil takes the map and locks the group in a cage over a bottomless pit. While looking through his Polaroids, Kevin finds one that includes the map, and the group realises that there is a hole near them. They escape from the cage, and Kevin distracts their pursuers while the others go through the hole.

Evil confronts Kevin when the dwarfs return with various warriors and fighting machines from across time, but Evil effortlessly and comically defeats them all. As Evil prepares to unleash his ultimate power, he is suddenly engulfed in flames and explodes into pieces of foul, charred rubble; from the smoke, a besuited elderly man, revealed as the Supreme Being, emerges. He explains that he allowed the dwarfs to borrow his map, the whole adventure having been a test, and orders the dwarfs to collect the pieces of Evil's remains, warning that they can be deadly. After recovering the map, he allows the dwarfs to rejoin him in his creation duties, and disappears with the dwarfs, leaving Kevin behind as a missed piece of Evil begins to smoulder. Kevin awakens in his bedroom and is rescued by firefighters - the chief of which resembles Agamemnon - as they put out a fire in his house. As Kevin finds he still has the photos from his adventure, his parents discover a smouldering rock in the toaster oven - recognising it as a piece of Evil, Kevin warns them not to touch it, but they ignore him, do so, and explode, leaving only their shoes. As the chief firefighter winks at the boy before leaving, Kevin approaches the smoking shoes and is seen from above as his figure grows smaller, revealing the planet and outer space, before being rolled up in the map by the Supreme Being.

== Cast ==
- David Rappaport as Randall
- Kenny Baker as Fidgit
- Malcolm Dixon as Strutter
- Mike Edmonds as Og
- Jack Purvis as Wally
- Tiny Ross as Vermin
- Craig Warnock as Kevin
- David Daker as Trevor, Kevin's father
- Sheila Fearn as Diane, Kevin's mother
- Jim Broadbent as TV game show host
- Charles McKeown as Theatre Manager
- Neil McCarthy as Marion
- Derek Deadman as Robert
- Jerold Wells as Benson

Appearing in unnamed cameos throughout the film

- John Cleese as Robin Hood
- Sean Connery as Agamemnon
- Shelley Duvall as Pansy
- Katherine Helmond as Mrs Ogre
- Ian Holm as Napoleon
- Michael Palin as Vincent
- Ralph Richardson as the Supreme Being
- Peter Vaughan as Winston the Ogre
- David Warner as Evil

== Production ==
=== Development ===
In November 1979, Terry Gilliam developed the concept for Time Bandits after he had started work on Brazil. Monty Python manager and producer Denis O'Brien had difficulty understanding the concept of Brazil, so Gilliam decided on the idea of a family film. O'Brien had set up HandMade Films in London for the former Beatle George Harrison to produce Life of Brian and the initiative was to produce more films with Python talent. When Gilliam's pitch was accepted he co-wrote the script with fellow Python Michael Palin.

=== Casting ===
Sean Connery was cast as Agamemnon after he met producer O'Brien on a golf course. A reference in the script introduced the character with the joke description: "Removing his helmet reveals himself to be none other than Sean Connery or an actor of equal but cheaper stature". Connery was a Python fan and agreed to do the role for a nominal fee in return for a share of the gross profits.

The part of Robin Hood was originally written for Palin but John Cleese was eventually cast as his name was considered more bankable. Palin decided to appear with Shelley Duvall in the small recurring roles of Vincent and Pansy. Cleese based his performance on the Duke of Kent by watching him having meaningless conversations with footballers at the FA Cup Final during the team line-up before the match. Cleese remarked: "It always struck me as the most extraordinary ritual, the complete futility of that walking up and down thing".

Ralph Richardson's casting as the Supreme Being was because he was regarded "pretty much near God in the acting profession". Richardson took his role seriously, marking out his lines in red ink and occasionally saying, "God wouldn't say that".

Ruth Gordon and Gilda Radner were considered for the role of Mrs Ogre. Palin felt Gordon was the best choice but she had to drop out after sustaining an injury shooting Any Which Way You Can. The studio wanted Radner considering her bankable, but Gilliam campaigned for Katherine Helmond due to the popularity of the TV comedy Soap.

Jonathan Pryce was offered the role of Evil but opted for another film (Loophole) for a higher fee as "he was broke" at the time.

=== Filming ===
Filming was partly on location with Raglan Castle standing in for Castiglione delle Stiviere, Epping Forest as Sherwood Forest and Aït Benhaddou as Agamemnon's palace in Mycenae. Interior scenes were filmed at Lee International Film Studios. Gilliam said he wanted to film from a "kid's point of view" and therefore shot from a low camera angle. He also said, "fearing a child wouldn't sustain the film ... let's surround him with people of a similar height".

During post-production, Gilliam had argued about changing the story's downbeat ending with O'Brien, who was also pressuring him to include some of Harrison's songs. Harrison eventually wrote and performed the closing credits song "Dream Away". The lyrics contained Harrison's comments on Time Bandits and on Gilliam's behaviour during the making of the film.

=== Japanese release ===
The theatrical release in Japan was 1983. At cinemas outside of major metropolitan areas, preview screenings were shown as a double feature alongside the domestic production Harmagedon. Therefore, for commercial reasons on the part of the distributor who wanted to sell it as a children's programme, editing was carried out in a manner unique to Japan that "neglected the true intent of the work." Part of the scene of Robin Hood and the cannibal couple, and the last scene where the parents disappear were cut, resulting in a running time of approximately 103 minutes, approximately 13 minutes shorter than the original.

The last scene was used uncut when it was aired on TV ("Sunday Western Movie Theater" broadcast on 10 January 1988). Each videogram version (LD, DVD, Blu-ray) released in Japan is the original full-length version.

== Reception ==
=== Box office ===
The film was released in the US on 6 November 1981 and opened at number one at the box office for the weekend, grossing $6,507,356 from 821 theatres. The film remained number one for 4 weeks and grossed $36 million in the United States and Canada on a budget of $5 million (£2.2 million), and was the 13th highest-grossing film of the year in North America.

The film was re-released in the US on 12 November 1982 and grossed a further $6 million to take its gross to $42.4 million in the United States and Canada.

=== Critical response ===
On the review aggregator website Rotten Tomatoes, the film holds a 91% rating based on 54 reviews, with an average rating of 7.9/10. The consensus states: "Time Bandits is a remarkable time-travel fantasy from Terry Gilliam, who utilises fantastic set design and homemade special effects to create a vivid, original universe". On Metacritic, it received a weighted average rating of 79 out of 100 based on 18 critics, indicating "generally favorable reviews".

The film had mainly positive reviews. Gary Arnold of The Washington Post said it was "a marvellous cinematic tonic, a sumptuous new classic in the tradition of time-travel and fairy-tale adventure". David Ansen of Newsweek considered it "at once sophisticated and childlike in its magical but emotionally cool logic ... a wonderful wild card in the fall movie season". Vincent Canby of The New York Times said it was "a cheerfully irreverent lark – part fairy tale, part science fiction and part comedy".

Other critics gave the film less praise. Roger Ebert of the Chicago Sun-Times said: "I'm usually fairly certain whether or not I've seen a good movie. But my reaction to Time Bandits was ambiguous. I had great admiration for what was physically placed on the screen ... But I was disappointed by the breathless way the dramatic scenes were handled and by a breakneck pace that undermined the most important element of comedy, which is timing". Gene Siskel of the Chicago Tribune thought it was "an uneven special effects extravaganza ... Unfortunately, there are just too many visits to famous people". British critic Leslie Halliwell gave it one of four stars: "Curious tall tale in which schoolboy fantasy alternates with violence and black comedy. In general much less funny than it intended to be, but with some hilarious moments." Pauline Kael stated: "Gilliam has a cacophonous imagination; even the magical incongruities are often cancelled out by the incessant buzz of cleverness ... The director doesn't shape the material satisfyingly; this may be one of those rare pictures that suffers from a surfeit of good ideas."

C. J. Henderson reviewed Time Bandits for Pegasus magazine and stated that "To sum up briefly, Time Bandits is not essentially a comedy. What it is, is fast-paced, irreverent, damn funny, and damn entertaining. And, compared to a lot of films which have come out this year, that is almost more than one could hope for." C. J. Henderson reviewed Time Bandits for the following issue of Pegasus magazine and stated that "unlike movies like the classic Wizard of Oz, there is no sentiment in Time Bandits. The film is a confusing, somewhat tragic tale; this does not make it unenjoyable, but it does make it different. For many people, it was too different."

=== Legacy ===
Gilliam has referred to Time Bandits as the first in his "Trilogy of Imagination", followed by Brazil (1985) and ending with The Adventures of Baron Munchausen (1988). All are about the "craziness of our awkwardly ordered society and the desire to escape it through whatever means possible". All three films focus on these struggles and attempts to escape them through imagination: Time Bandits through the eyes of a child, Brazil through the eyes of a man in his thirties, and Munchausen through the eyes of an elderly man.

The film is ranked No. 22 on Empire magazine's "The 50 best kids' movies". It is listed as one of Time magazine's "Top 10 Time-Travel Movies".

Game designer Richard Garriott was inspired by Time Bandits while creating the 1982 game Ultima II: The Revenge of the Enchantress, stating that he watched the film about 20 times to create a copy of the time map, as his game would feature a similar mechanic of "time doors" and the game's box even had a similar cloth map inside.

== Home media ==
The film was originally released in December 1982 on Betamax, VHS, Video 2000 and CED Videodisc in the UK and on VHS in the US the same year.

In 1997, it was released on LaserDisc by The Criterion Collection and includes commentary by Gilliam and Palin, Cleese, Warner and Warnock. It also includes a Time Bandits Scrapbook.

In 1999, a DVD was released by Criterion with the original 1997 LaserDisc features and the theatrical trailer. The same year Anchor Bay Entertainment released a version with no extras or special features. In 2004, Anchor Bay released the DVD as a Divimax edition on two discs with special features but no commentary. The features include the AFI's 'The Films of Terry Gilliam' documentary; an interview with Gilliam and Palin; theatrical trailers; Gilliam's bio; and a DVD-ROM with the original screenplay and a fold-out Map of the Universe.

In 2010, a Blu-ray version was released by Anchor Bay and included an interview with Gilliam and a theatrical trailer. In 2013, a Blu-ray version was released by Arrow Films in the UK. The original 35mm negative was scanned at 2K resolution and the restoration was approved by Gilliam. In 2014, a Blu-ray was released by Criterion as a new 2K digital restoration and includes the original commentary from the 1997 LaserDisc by Gilliam and Palin, Cleese, Warner and Warnock; a feature with production designer Milly Burns and costume designer James Acheson; a 1998 conversation between Gilliam and film scholar Peter von Bagh; a 1981 appearance by Shelley Duvall on Tom Snyder's The Tomorrow Show; a photo gallery; the theatrical trailer; and an insert that has a reproduction of the Map of the Universe on one side and an essay by David Sterritt on the other. In 2023, a 4K UHD version was released by Arrow Films and Criterion, again with the transfer supervised by Gilliam, including the same special features as the earlier 2K version.

== Comic book adaptation ==
Marvel Comics published a comic book adaptation of the film in February 1982. It was written by Steve Parkhouse and drawn by David Lloyd and John Stokes.

== Planned sequel ==
Gilliam and Charles McKeown wrote a script for Time Bandits II in 1996 and planned to bring back the original cast, except for David Rappaport and Tiny Ross who had since died. When Jack Purvis died the following year, the sequel was shelved.

== Television series ==
In July 2018, it was announced that Apple Inc. had gained rights and closed a deal with Anonymous Content, Paramount Television Studios, and MRC Television to develop a television series version of the Terry Gilliam film, also entitled Time Bandits, to distribute on Apple TV+, with Gilliam on board set to serve only as executive producer (thus in a non-writing production role) and Taika Waititi set to co-write and direct the pilot. Lisa Kudrow stars alongside Kal-El Tuck, Charlyne Yi, Tadhg Murphy, Roger Jean Nsengiyumva, Rune Temte, Kiera Thompson and Rachel House.

Production took place in New Zealand in late 2022 and early 2023.
