= List of James McAvoy performances =

List of films featuring James McAvoy

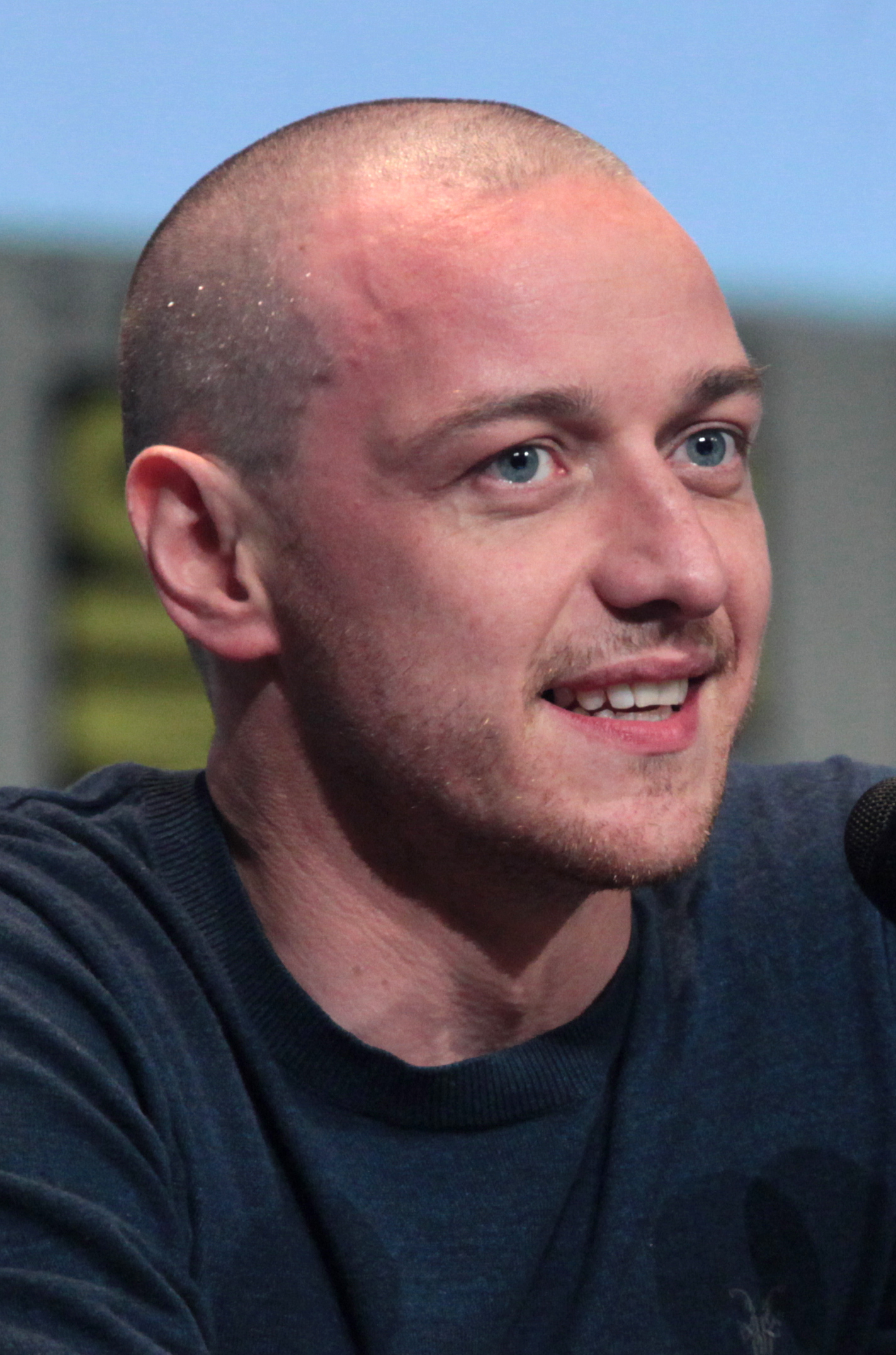
- McAvoy in 2015
- Film: 43
- Television series: 16
- Theatre: 13

Scottish actor James McAvoy made his acting debut as a teen in the 1995 film The Near Room with Andy Serkis. He appeared in the films Wimbledon (2004) and Inside I'm Dancing (2004), before being cast as Mr. Tumnus in the 2005 fantasy film The Chronicles of Narnia: The Lion, the Witch and the Wardrobe, based on C. S. Lewis's 1950 novel. The following year, he starred in director Kevin Macdonald's drama film The Last King of Scotland. He co-starred in the romance films Penelope (2006) with Christina Ricci, Becoming Jane (2007) with Anne Hathaway, and Atonement (2007) with Keira Knightley. He made his theatre debut as Riff in the West Side Story at the Courtyard Centre for the Arts Hereford. He has since performed in several West End productions, receiving four Laurence Olivier Award for Best Actor nominations.

In 2011, McAvoy was cast as Charles Xavier, a fictional character based on the Marvel Comics character in the superhero film X-Men: First Class (2011). He later reprised his role in X-Men: Days of Future Past (2014), X-Men: Apocalypse (2016), Deadpool 2 (2018) and Dark Phoenix (2019). McAvoy starred in the 2013 crime comedy-drama film Filth, for which he won Best Actor in the British Independent Film Awards. A year later, he starred with Jessica Chastain in The Disappearance of Eleanor Rigby, the collective title of three films, Him, Her and Them. In 2016, he portrayed Kevin Wendell Crumb, a man with 23 alternate personalities, in M. Night Shyamalan's Split, for which he received critical acclaim, and later reprised the role for the sequel Glass (2019). He has starred in the science fiction horror film Victor Frankenstein with Daniel Radcliffe (2015), action thriller film Atomic Blonde with Charlize Theron (2017), and played Bill Denbrough in the supernatural horror film It Chapter Two, the second installment of the It film series based on Stephen King's 1986 novel.

McAvoy's television work includes a minor role in the HBO war drama miniseries Band of Brothers (2001), the thriller State of Play (2003) and as Leto II Atreides in the science fiction miniseries Frank Herbert's Children of Dune (2003). From 2004 to 2005, he played Steve McBride in the British comedy drama Shameless. From 2019 to 2022, he portrayed Lord Asriel Belacqua in the BBC/HBO fantasy series His Dark Materials.

== Film ==
Film
Year	Title	Role	Notes	Ref.
1995	The Near Room	Kevin Savage		
1997	An Angel Passes By	Local boy	Short film	
1997	Regeneration	Anthony Balfour		
2001	Swimming Pool	Mike		
2003	Bright Young Things	The Earl of Balcairn		
2003	Bollywood Queen	Jay		
2004	Wimbledon	Carl Colt		
2004	Strings	Hal Tara (voice)		
2004	Inside I'm Dancing	Rory O'Shea		
2005	The Chronicles of Narnia: The Lion, the Witch and the Wardrobe	Mr. Tumnus		
2006	The Last King of Scotland	Nicholas Garrigan		
2006	Starter for 10	Brian Jackson		
2006	Penelope	Johnny Martin		
2007	Becoming Jane	Thomas Langlois Lefroy		
2007	Atonement	Robbie Turner		
2008	Wanted	Wesley Gibson		
2009	The Last Station	Valentin Bulgakov		
2010	The Conspirator	Frederick Aiken		
2011	Gnomeo & Juliet	Gnomeo (voice)		
2011	X-Men: First Class	Charles Xavier		
2011	Arthur Christmas	Arthur Claus (voice)		
2013	Welcome to the Punch	Max Lewinsky		
2013	Trance	Simon Newton		
2013	Filth	Bruce Robertson		
2014	Muppets Most Wanted	Delivery man	Cameo	
2014	X-Men: Days of Future Past	Professor Charles Xavier	Shared role with Patrick Stewart	
2014	The Disappearance of Eleanor Rigby	Conor Ludlow		
2015	Victor Frankenstein	Victor Frankenstein		
2016	X-Men: Apocalypse	Professor Charles Xavier		
2016	Split	Kevin Wendell Crumb / Dennis / Patricia / Hedwig / The Beast / Barry / Orwell / Jade		
2017	Atomic Blonde	David Percival		
2017	Submergence	James More		
2018	Sherlock Gnomes	Gnomeo (voice)		
2018	Deadpool 2	Professor Charles Xavier	Uncredited cameo	
2019	Glass	Kevin Wendell Crumb / The Beast		
2019	X-Men: Dark Phoenix	Professor Charles Xavier		
2019	It Chapter Two	Bill Denbrough		
2021	My Son	Edmond Murray		
2022	The Bubble	Himself	Cameo	
2023	The Book of Clarence	Pontius Pilate		
2024	Speak No Evil	Paddy		
2025	California Schemin'	Anthony	Also director	
2025	Pose	Thomas		
2026	Faith †	Michael		
TBA	Control †	Dr. Conway	Post-production	

Key
†	Denotes films that have not yet been released

== Television ==
Television
Year	Title	Role	Notes	Ref.
1997	The Bill	Gavin Donald	Episode: "Rent"	
2001	Band of Brothers	James W. Miller	Episode: "Replacements"	
2001	Lorna Doone	Sergeant Bloxham	Television film	
2001	Murder in Mind	Martin Vosper	Episode: "Teacher"	
2002	White Teeth	Josh Malfen	2 episodes	
2002	The Inspector Lynley Mysteries	Gowan Ross	Episode: "Payment in Blood"	
2002	Foyle's War	Ray Pritchard	Episode: "The German Woman"	
2003	Frank Herbert's Children of Dune	Leto II Atreides	3 episodes	
2003	State of Play	Dan Foster	6 episodes	
2003	Early Doors	Liam	4 episodes	
2004–2005	Shameless	Steve McBride	13 episodes	
2005	ShakespeaRe-Told	Joe Macbeth	Episode: "Macbeth"	
2018	Watership Down	Hazel (voice)	4 episodes	
2019	Saturday Night Live	Himself / Host	Episode: "James McAvoy/Meek Mill"	
2019–2022	His Dark Materials	Lord Asriel Belacqua	9 episodes	
2021	Together	He	Television film	
2022	The Sandman	Golden-Haired Man (voice)	Episode: "Dream of a Thousand Cats"	
2027	Meantime †	Felix McAveety	Lead role	

== Stage ==
Stage
Year	Title	Role	Venue	Ref.
1999	West Side Story	Riff	Courtyard Centre for the Arts	
1999	Romeo and Juliet	Romeo	Courtyard Centre for the Arts	
1999	Beauty and the Beast	Bobby Buckfast	Adam Smith Theatre	
2000	The Tempest	Ferdinand	Brunton Theatre	
2000	The Reel of the Hanged Man	Gerald	Traverse Theatre	
2000	Lovers	Joe	Royal Lyceum Theatre	
2001	Out In The Open	Iggy	Hampstead Theatre	
2001	Privates on Parade	Private Steven Flowers	Donmar Warehouse	
2005	Breathing Corpses	Ben	Royal Court Theatre	
2009	Three Days of Rain	Walker & Ned	Apollo Theatre	
2013	Macbeth	Macbeth	Trafalgar Studios	
2015	The Ruling Class	Jack Gurney	Trafalgar Studios	
2019–2022	Cyrano de Bergerac	Cyrano	Playhouse Theatre; Brooklyn Academy of Music	

== Video games ==
Video games
Year	Title	Voice role	Notes	Ref.
2021	Twelve Minutes	Man		

== Audiobooks and radio ==
Audiobooks and radio
Year	Title	Role	Ref.
2013	Neverwhere	Richard Mayhew	
2015	Orson Welles' Heart of Darkness	Marlow	
2020	The Sandman	Dream	
2026	Harry Potter: The Full-Cast Audio Editions	Mad-Eye Moody	
