= Rachael Stirling =

British actress (born 1977)

- Born: 30 May 1977 (age 49); London, England
- Education: University of Edinburgh (BA)
- Years active: 1997–present
- Known for: Detectorists; Snow White and the Huntsman; Salmon Fishing in the Yemen; The Young Victoria
- Television: Detectorists; Tipping the Velvet (2002); Boy Meets Girl (2009); The Bletchley Circle (2012–2014)
- Spouse: Guy Garvey (m. 2016)
- Children: 1
- Parents: Archie Stirling (father); Dame Diana Rigg (mother)

Rachael Atlanta Stirling (born 30 May 1977) is a British stage, film, and television actress. She played Becky in the BBC comedy series Detectorists, Nancy Astley in the BBC drama Tipping the Velvet, and Millie in the ITV series The Bletchley Circle. She has also guest-starred in Lewis and one episode of Doctor Who, co-starring with her mother, Diana Rigg. She has been nominated twice for the Laurence Olivier Award for her stage work.

== Early life and education ==
Rachael Atlanta Stirling was born on 30 May 1977 in Marylebone, London, England, and is the daughter of actress Diana Rigg and theatre producer Archibald Stirling, Laird of Keir. Her parents married in 1982 and divorced in 1990.

Stirling attended the private boarding school Wycombe Abbey. She graduated with a BA in art history from the University of Edinburgh, where she performed with the Edinburgh University Theatre Company.

== Theatre ==
Stirling made her first major appearance on stage in 1997 as Desdemona in the National Youth Theatre revival of Othello at the Arts Theatre opposite Chiwetel Ejiofor in the title role. A year later, again at the Arts Theatre with the NYT, she played Olive in the female version of The Odd Couple; while in 1998, portraying Kate in Dancing at Lughnasa for NYT at the Arts. She next appeared in a variety of roles in plays such as Dusty Hughes' Helpless (Donmar Warehouse, 2000); A Woman of No Importance (Theatre Royal Haymarket, 2003); Anna in the Tropics (Hampstead Theatre, 2004); and Tamburlaine (Bristol Old Vic and Barbican, 2005), and she followed in her mother's footsteps as Lionheart's daughter in the National Theatre stage version of Theatre of Blood (2005). In 2006, for the Peter Hall Company at the Theatre Royal, Bath, she played Helena in Peter Gill's revival of Look Back in Anger, while in 2007 at Wilton's Music Hall in London, she starred as Yelena in David Mamet's version of Uncle Vanya, and as Katharina in The Taming of the Shrew.

Stirling starred onstage in The Priory directed by Jeremy Herrin at the Royal Court Theatre in 2009. Her role as Rebecca earned her a nomination for Laurence Olivier Award for Best Performance in a Supporting Role. In 2010 she appeared as Helena in Peter Hall's production of A Midsummer Night's Dream at the Rose Theatre, Kingston. Stirling starred as Lady Chiltern in a 2010 production of An Ideal Husband at the Vaudeville Theatre, for which she received her second nomination for a Laurence Olivier Award. From February to April 2012, she appeared as Sylvia alongside Mark Gatiss, Tobias Menzies, and Nancy Carroll in The Recruiting Officer, the production at the Donmar Warehouse directed by newly appointed artistic director Josie Rourke.

== Film ==
Stirling's first screen appearance was in the 1998 British comedy film Still Crazy. Her other film appearances include Maybe Baby, Redemption Road (2001), Complicity (with her Tipping the Velvet co-star Keeley Hawes), Another Life (with Vanity Fair actress Natasha Little), Triumph of Love (with Mira Sorvino), as Mary Jones in Salmon Fishing in the Yemen, and as Anna in Snow White and the Huntsman.

== Television ==
Stirling's first break in television was in the 2000 NBC miniseries In the Beginning, which was adapted from the Book of Genesis. Stirling played the young Rebeccah, with her mother, Diana Rigg, as the older Rebeccah. Her next notable role was Nan Astley in the 2002 BBC drama series Tipping the Velvet.

In 2003, she appeared as Caroline Crale in Agatha Christie's Poirot episode "Five Little Pigs".

In 2011, Stirling starred in the BBC Four adaptation of D.H. Lawrence's Women in Love as Ursula Brangwen. She portrayed Millie in both series of the ITV mystery drama The Bletchley Circle in 2012 and 2014, and reprised the role in The Bletchley Circle: San Francisco (2018).

Stirling appeared in a 2013 episode of Doctor Who titled "The Crimson Horror" alongside her mother. The episode had been specially written for Stirling and her mother by Mark Gatiss (marking the very first appearance of the two actresses together professionally) and was aired on 4 May 2013 as part of Series 7.

In 2014, Stirling portrayed Kate Wilkinson in the Cold War spy thriller television series The Game. She appeared as a main character in the BBC Four comedy drama Detectorists as Becky, initially girlfriend, then wife, of Andy (played by Mackenzie Crook), also featuring alongside her mother, Diana Rigg, who played Becky's mother.

Stirling appeared as a guest on the BBC One cookery programme Saturday Kitchen Live which was broadcast on 1 March 2014.

In 2015, Stirling played the part of Arabella Yount, the spendthrift wife of a banker, in the three-part BBC series Capital based on John Lanchester's novel of the same name.

In December 2016, Stirling appeared on University Challenge at Christmas as part of a team made up of notable alumni of the University of Edinburgh.

In 2021, she starred in the ITV television drama series Hollington Drive.

== Other work ==
Stirling is an occasional interviewer on the BBC Radio 4 chat show Loose Ends, and presented the station's programme Stage Door in December 2012. She also wrote a restaurant column for Diplomat magazine. In 2014, Stirling appeared as a guest on BBC Radio 4's Midweek with Libby Purves, Roger Bannister, and Kevin Warwick.

== Personal life ==
Stirling can speak Russian and is experienced in horse riding and jumping.

From 2007 to 2012, she was in a relationship with actor Oliver Chris. Stirling married musician and Elbow frontman Guy Garvey on 3 June 2016; they have one son, born in April 2017.

== Filmography ==
Year	Film/Show	Role	Notes
1998	Still Crazy	Clare Knowles	
2000	Maybe Baby	Joanna	
2000	Complicity	Claire	
2001	Redemption Road	Becky	
2001	Another Life	Avis Graydon	
2001	Triumph of Love	Corine	
2004	Freeze Frame	Katie Carter	
2006	The Truth	Martha	
2007	Dangerous Parking	Kirstin	
2009	The Young Victoria	Duchess of Sutherland	
2010	Centurion	Druzilla	
2012	Salmon Fishing in the Yemen	Mary Jones	
2012	Snow White & the Huntsman	Anna	
2013	Sixteen	Laura	
2015	Scottish Mussel	Ms Pringle	
2016	Their Finest	Phyl Moore	

== Television ==
Year	Title	Role	Notes
2000	In the Beginning	Young Rebeccah	TV film
2001	Othello	Lulu	TV film
2002	Tipping the Velvet	Nan Astley	Miniseries
2002	Bait	Stephanie Raeburn	TV film
2003	Agatha Christie's Poirot	Caroline Crale	Episode: "Five Little Pigs"
2004	Agatha Christie's Marple	Griselda Clement	Episode: "The Murder at the Vicarage"
2004	The Final Quest	Young Annabelle	TV film
2005	Riot at the Rite	Marie Rambert	TV film
2006	Beyond	Guilean Hade	TV film
2006	Hotel Babylon	Nina Bailey	First episode
2006	The Haunted Airman	Julia Jugg	TV film
2008	Lewis	Zöe Kenneth	Episode: "Life Born of Fire"
2009	Minder	Eve Cornell	Episode: "Thank Your Lucky Stars"
2009	Boy Meets Girl	Veronica Burton	4 episodes
2011	Women in Love	Ursula Brangwen	Miniseries
2012	The Bletchley Circle	Millie	Miniseries
2013	Doctor Who	Ada Gillyflower	Episode: "The Crimson Horror"
2014	The Game	Kate Wilkinson	Miniseries
2014–2022	Detectorists	Becky	19 episodes
2015	Capital	Arabella Yount	Miniseries
2016	Churchill's Secret	Sarah Churchill	TV film
2018	The Bletchley Circle: San Francisco	Millie	TV series spin-off of The Bletchley Circle
2019	Wild Bill	Lady Mary Harborough	
2020	Life	Kelly Aston	Miniseries
2021	Midsomer Murders	Eleanor Karras	Episode: "Happy Families"
2021	Hollington Drive	Helen	Miniseries
2023	Heartstopper	Amanda Olsson	2 episodes
2023	The Chelsea Detective	Rebekah Chaban	Episode: "The Blue Room"
2026	Believe Me	Philippa Kaufman K.C.	1 Episode
2026	Rivals	Araminta Pemberton	1 Episode

== Books ==
In 2026 Stirling wrote a biography of her mother titled All About My Mother: A Memoir of Diana Rigg.
