= Zapped =

Zapped may refer to:

- Zapped!, a 1982 American teen comedy film
- Zapped (2014 film), a Disney Channel original film
- Zapped (TV series), a British television sitcom
