= Julie Graham =

Scottish actress (born 1965)

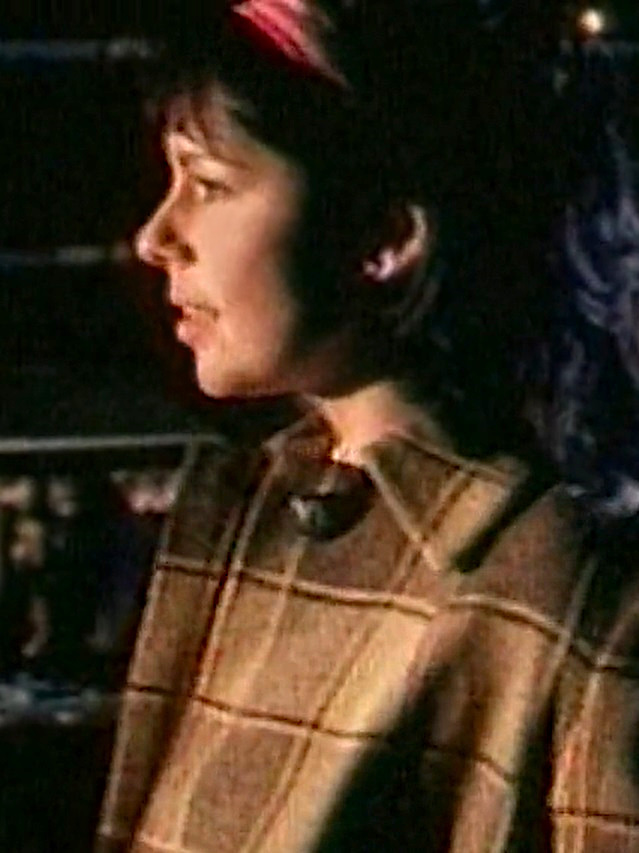
- Graham in Love Me Tender (1997)
- Born: 24 July 1965 (age 61); Irvine, Scotland
- Occupation: Actress
- Years active: 1984–present
- Spouses: Joseph A. Bennett (m. 2002; died 2015) Davy Croket (m. 2019)
- Children: 2

Julie Dawn Graham (born 24 July 1965) is a Scottish actress from Irvine. Her credits include Taggart (1986), The Fruit Machine (1988), Nuns on the Run (1990), Harry (1993–1995), The Near Room (1995), Preaching to the Perverted (1997), Bedrooms and Hallways (1998), Some Voices (2000), At Home with the Braithwaites (2000–2003), William and Mary (2003–2005), Bonekickers (2008), Doc Martin (2011), Tower Block (2012), The Bletchley Circle (2013), Shetland (2014–2022), Benidorm (2016–2018), Doctor Who (2020), Queens of Mystery (2019–2021), Midsomer Murders (2013,2023), Ridley (2023), (2025), The Hardacres (2024–2025), and This City Is Ours (2025). Silent Witness (2024)

== Early life ==
Graham was born on 24 July 1965, in Irvine, Scotland. She was raised by her mother Betty who died from lung cancer at age 50 when Julie was a teenager.

== Career ==
Graham has appeared in the Channel 4 Blood Red Roses (1986, filmed in East Kilbride). She appeared as Kathleen Kelly in 3 episodes of Taggart (1986), and had roles as Alison McGrellis in Casualty (1988), Alice in Harry (1993–1995), Megan Hartnoll in At Home with the Braithwaites (2000–2003), and Mary Gilcrest in William and Mary (2003–2005).

Her film credits include The Fruit Machine (1988), Silent Scream (1990), Nuns on the Run (1990), The Big Man (1990), The Near Room (1995), Preaching to the Perverted (1997), Bedrooms and Hallways (1998), and Some Voices (2000). In 1991, she starred in the short film Rosebud with UK painter Sadie Lee.

She appeared as Rosie in the Leave It All Behind series of British television commercials for the Peugeot 106 car, alongside Annie Dunkley and Michael McKell in the mid-1990s. In 2006, she appeared as Kylie/Patricia in episode 2 of Sharman.

In 2007, she appeared as Donna Doig in the three-part ITV drama series Mobile. In 2008, she played the role of Dr. Gillian Magwilde, an archaeologist, in the BBC television drama Bonekickers. She then starred as Abby Grant in the BBC drama Survivors. In 2010, she took on the role of Commander Lisa Kennedy in a seven-episode story arc of The Bill, as well as guest-starring in the final story of the fourth series of the Doctor Who spinoff show The Sarah Jane Adventures, playing the villainous alien Ruby White in the story Goodbye, Sarah Jane Smith. In 2008, The Times described Graham as "the small screen's resident raver, a one-woman festival of naturism".

She appeared as Maggie Reid in the fifth series of the popular ITV drama Doc Martin (2011). She portrayed Jean in the 2012 series The Bletchley Circle. Graham reprised her role of Jean in 2018 show, The Bletchley Circle: San Francisco. In 2011, Graham starred in the one-off BBC Christmas show Lapland, a role which she returned to for a series titled Being Eileen airing from February 2013.

In 2012, Graham appeared in the film Tower Block. In 2013, Graham appeared in episode 8 of series two of the BBC series Death in Paradise. From 2014 to 2022, Graham appeared in the recurring role of Rhona Kelly, the procurator fiscal, in the Scottish television crime drama, Shetland.

In 2016, Graham began portraying Sheron Dawson in the eighth series of the ITV sitcom Benidorm. In 2020, Graham portrayed Ravio in episodes "Ascension of the Cybermen" and "The Timeless Children" in BBC's Doctor Who.

Graham has made appearances as Dr. Laura Parr in 2013 in series 15, episode 5: "The Sicilian Defense", and as Dixie Havergal in 2023 in series 24, episode 4: "A Climate of Death" in the ITV mystery-crime series Midsomer Murders.

From 2019, she played a main role as Cat Stone in series 1 and 2 of the Acorn TV British murder-mystery comedy-drama television series Queens of Mystery (2019–2021). She played Annie Marling in the miniseries Ridley (2023).

In 2025, she played the main role of Elaine Phelan, wife of Ronnie Phelan (played by Sean Bean), and their son Jamie (played by Jack McMullen), alongside James Nelson-Joyce, in the BBC One Liverpool based gangster television series, This City Is Ours (2025).

=== Theatre ===
In 2000, she appeared in Dusty Hughes' Helpless at the Donmar Warehouse.

== Personal life ==
Graham was married to actor Joseph A. Bennett from 2002 until he died by suicide on 13 April 2015.

On 11 October 2019, Graham married Belgian skydiving instructor Davy Croket.

== Filmography ==
Film
Year	Title	Role	Notes
1988	The Fruit Machine	Hazel	
1990	Nuns on the Run	Casino Waitress	
1990	The Big Man	Melanie	
1990	Silent Scream	Alice / Betty – Larry's Fantasy	
1991	Blonde Fist	Sylvie	
1991	Rosebud	Kay – The Artist	Short film
1995	The Near Room	Elise Gray	
1997	Preaching to the Perverted	Eugenie	
1997	Macbeth Taped		Short film
1997	Daylight Robbery	Shelly	Short film
1998	Bedrooms and Hallways	Angie	
1999	With or Without You	Cathy	
1999	Bodyshifters	Fiona	
2000	Some Voices	Mandy	
2012	Tower Block	Carol	
2013	Shortcuts to Hell: Volume 1	Estate Agent	
2014	The Sleeping Room	Cynthia	
2014	Flinch	Paula	Short film
2015	Jupiter Ascending	Captain of the Aegis	Uncredited role
2015	The Other Amy	Dr. Rachael Sumner	Short film
2018	The Party's Just Beginning		
2021	End of Term	DS Stacy Harcourt	

Television
Year	Title	Role	Notes
1984	End of the Line	Lucy – Girl	2 episodes: "Blowout" and "A View of Things"
1986	Taggart	Kathleen Kelly	Series 2, Episodes 4–6: "Death Call: Parts 1–3"
1986	Blood Red Roses	Janey	3 episodes
1987	The Houseman's Tale	Nurse Joan Masson	Mini-series; 2 episodes
1987	Strike It Rich!	Kirstie Munro	Series 2, Episodes 2–6
1987	Brond	Girl in Brothel	Episode: "#1.3"
1987	Dramarama	Tillie Campbell	Series 5, Episode 9: "Stan's First Night"
1987	Napoleon and Josephine: A Love Story	Caroline Bonaparte	Mini-series; all 3 episodes
1988	The Play on One	Sandra	Episode 2: "The Dark Room"
1988	Bookie	Sue	3 episodes: "Trial Run", "Deep Water" and "Cardunal Sin"
1988	Casualty	Alison McGrellis	Series 3, Episodes 1–10
1989	The Bill	Thelma Box	Series 5, Episode 62: "Black Spot"
1990	Boon	Moira Connolly	Series 5, Episode 5: "Work, Rest & Play"
1992	Spender	Jody	Series 2, Episode 3: "Fee"
1992	Downtown Lagos	Sharon	Mini-series; all 3 episodes
1993–1995	Harry	Alice	Series 1 & 2, 20 episodes
1994	99-1	Lisa	Episodes 5 & 6: "Quicker Than the Eye" and "The Cost of Living"
1995	Bugs	Sarita	Episode 6: "Stealth"
1996	Heartbeat	Dorothy McGowan	Series 6, Episode 1: "Kids"
1996	Sharman	Kylie	Episode 2: "Hearts of Stone"
1997	Love Me Tender	Rose	Television film
1997	Dalziel and Pascoe	Adi Pritchard	Series 2, Episode 2: "A Killing Kindness"
1998	Space Island One	Michelle Stock	Series 2, Episode 12: "Money Makes the World Go Around"
1999	Butterfly Collectors	Det. Sgt. Mary Slater	Television film
1999	Life Support	Alison McIntyre	All 6 episodes
2000	Dirty Tricks	Karen	Television film
2000–2003	At Home with the Braithwaites	Megan Hartnoll	Main role; all 4 series, 24 episodes
2002	The Bill	Linda Kendrick	Series 18, 7 episodes
2003	Between the Sheets	Alona Cunningham – Sex therapist	Mini-series; all 6 episodes
2003–2005	William and Mary	Mary Gilcrest	Main role; all 3 series, 18 episodes
2005	Walk Away and I Stumble	Elaine Spader	Television film
2006	Afterlife	Lucy	Series 2, Episode 4: ”Your Hand in Mine”
2006	The Kindness of Strangers	Ellie Farrelly	Television film
2007	Agatha Christie's Marple	Mary Aldin	Series 3, Episode 3: “Towards Zero”
2007	Mobile	Donna Doig	Mini-series; 4 episodes
2007	The History of Mr Polly	Nancy Potter	Television film
2007	Rebus	Stacy Webster	Series 4, Episode 3: "The Naming of the Dead"
2008	Bonekickers	Gillian Magwilde	All 6 episodes
2008–2010	Survivors	Abby Grant	Series 1 & 2, all 12 episodes
2010	The Sarah Jane Adventures	Ruby White	Series 4, Episodes 11 & 12: "Goodbye, Sarah Jane Smith: Parts 1 & 2"
2010	The Bill	Commander Lisa Kennedy	Series 26, Episodes 8–14
2011	Doc Martin	Maggie Reid	Series 5, Episodes 5 & 6: "Remember Me" and "Don't Let Go"
2011, 2013	Lapland / Being Eileen	Mandy Lewis	Originally a television film, titled Lapland, continued as Being Eileen; all 6 episodes
2012	Secrets and Words	Fiona	Episode 1: “Love Letters"
2012	Vera	Marianne Gower	Series 2, Episode 1: “The Ghost Position”
2012–2014	The Bletchley Circle	Jean	Series 1 & 2; all 7 episodes
2013	Midsomer Murders	Dr. Laura Parr	Series 15, Episode 5: “The Sicilian Defence”
2013	Death in Paradise	Jen Powell	Series 3, Episode 8: “A Deadly Party”
2014	New Tricks	Tricia McAndrew	Series 11, Episodes 4 & 8: "Ghosts" and "The English Defence"
2014–2019, 2022	Shetland	Rhona Kelly	Series 2–5 & 7, 25 episodes
2016	One of Us	Moira Douglas	Mini-series; all 4 episodes
2016–2018	Benidorm	Sheron Dawson	Series 8–10, 25 episodes
2018	The Bletchley Circle: San Francisco	Jean McBrian	Spin-off of The Bletchley Circle. All 8 episodes
2019–2021	Queens of Mystery	Cat Stone	Main role. Series 1 & 2, all 12 episodes
2020	Doctor Who	Ravio	Series 12, Episodes 9 & 10: "Ascension of the Cybermen" and "The Timeless Children"
2020	Moving On	Pauline Giles	Series 11, Episode 4: "Redundant"
2020	Penance	Rosalie Douglas	Mini-series; all 3 episodes
2020	Dun Breedin'	Roo Jameson	Main role (and writer). Mini-series; 9 episodes
2022	Two Doors Down	Gail	Series 5, Episode 7: "Amalfi Friends"
2022	Ridley	Annie Marling	All 4 episodes
2023	Maternal	Dr. Susan Fisher	ITV drama. All 6 episodes
2023	Time	Lou Harkness	Series 2, all 3 episodes
2023	Payback	Connie Morris	All 5 episodes
2023	The Serial Killer's Wife	Clover	All 4 episodes
2023	Midsomer Murders	Dixie Havergal	Episode: "A Climate of Death"
2024–present	The Hardacres	Ma Hardacre	Miniseries
2025–present	This City Is Ours	Elaine Phelan	Main role; 16 episodes
