= Joseph A. Bennett =

English actor (1967–2015)

- Born: 28 March 1967; London, England
- Died: 15 April 2015 (aged 48); Richmond Park, England
- Education: Royal Central School of Speech and Drama
- Years active: 1991–2015
- Spouse: Julie Graham (m. 2002)
- Children: 4

Joseph A. Bennett (28 March 1967 – 15 April 2015) was an English television, film, and theatre actor.

== Early life and education ==
Bennett was born in London, England in 1967. He trained at the Central School of Speech and Drama in London.

== Career ==
He was one of two actors (the other being Douglas Henshall) who portrayed T. E. Lawrence in The Young Indiana Jones Chronicles. He was also in various other TV shows and films, including The Bill, Boon and Howards End.

== Personal life ==
He was married to the actress Julie Graham from 2002. Bennett reportedly hanged himself in Richmond Park in April 2015. He was 48.

== Filmography ==
=== Film ===
| Year | Title | Role | Notes |
|---|---|---|---|
| 1992 | Howards End | Paul Wilcox | |
| 1992 | Just like a Woman | Jocelyn | |
| 1993 | Swing Kids | Luftwaffe Pilot | |
| 1993 | Century | Edwin | |
| 2001 | The Last Minute | Jarman | |
| 2006 | Corpse | The Corpse | Short film |

=== Television ===
| Year | Title | Role | Notes |
|---|---|---|---|
| 1991 | Boon | Joey Wallis | Episode: Cab Rank Cowboys |
| 1992 | The Young Indiana Jones Chronicles | Lawrence of Arabia | Episode: Young Indiana Jones and the Curse of the Jackal |
| 1992–1993 | The Bill | Peter Armstrong | 2 episodes |
| 1993 | The Darling Buds of May | Tony | 2 episodes |
| 1993 | Wycliffe and the Cycle of Death | David Glynn | TV Movie |
| 1996 | Frontiers | James Howard | Episode: Overseas Politicians |
| 1996 | Murder Most Horrid | Geoff | Episode: Confess |
| 1997 | Pie in the Sky | Victor Sebastian | Episode: Ugly Customers |
| 1997 | Trial & Retribution | David Polk | Episode: Trial & Retribution I – Part One |
| 1999 | The Dark Room | Simon Harris | TV Movie |
| 2000 | The Adventures of Young Indiana Jones: My First Adventure | Lawrence of Arabia | TV Movie |
| 2000 | Silent Witness | Carl Martin | 2 episodes |
| 2002 | Casualty | Brendan Collins | Episode: Gimme Shelter |
| 2004 | Down to Earth | Hartley Simmons | Episode: Seeing Is Believing |
| 2004 | Murphy's Law | Neeves | Episode: Jack's Back |
| 2004 | Doctors | Rhys Taylor | Episode: What If |
| 2004–2005 | William and Mary | DS London | 4 episodes |
