= Chanelle Peloso =

Canadian actress (born 1994)

- Born: Chanelle Christine Peloso; January 21, 1994 (age 32); Vancouver, British Columbia, Canada
- Occupation: Actor
- Years active: 2010–present
- Spouse: Kate Harquail (m. 2023)

Chanelle Harquail-Ivsak (née Peloso) (born January 21, 1994) is a Canadian television actress known for her role as Hailey Yarner in The Bletchley Circle: San Francisco, for which she received a Canadian Screen Award nomination for Best Supporting Actress in a Drama Series at the 7th Canadian Screen Awards in 2019.

== Career ==
Peloso began her career on Disney Channel films and series, including Radio Rebel and Zapped, along with roles on Cartoon Network series including Level Up and Incredible Crew.

In that same year, she starred as Petra Smith in the Netflix original series Another Life. She also voices the recurring character Romy in Barbie and the Secret Door and Potion Nova in My Little Pony: Pony Life, which premiered on June 21, 2020.

== Personal life ==
Peloso is a lesbian. In 2021, Peloso became engaged to musician and producer, Kate Harquail. On October 7, 2023, Peloso revealed they had married on May 20, 2023, in a private ceremony.

== Filmography ==
=== Film ===
Year	Title	Role	Notes
2014	Barbie and the Secret Door	Romy	Voice
2015	The Unspoken	Pandy	
2016	Like Lambs	Dahlia Fitzpatrick	
2019	A Cinderella Story: Christmas Wish	Grace	

=== Television ===
Year	Title	Role	Notes
2011	Girl Fight	Dana	Television film
2011–2012	The Haunting Hour: The Series	Cristen / Emma	2 episodes
2012	Radio Rebel	Neckbrace Girl	Television film
2012	Level Up	Natalie	6 episodes
2012–2013	Incredible Crew	Various roles	13 episodes
2013	King & Maxwell	Alina Meshki	Episode: "Second Chances"
2014	Zapped	Rachel	Television film
2016	A Time to Dance	Nicole Reynolds	Television film
2016	Motive	Karis Fraser	Episode: "Foreign Relations"
2017	Home for Christmas Day	Gina	Television film
2017	Supernatural	Ronson	Episode: "Patience"
2018	Littlest Pet Shop: A World of Our Own	Petunia Gloghoof	Episode: "All Decked Out"
2018	Sacred Lies	Rose Matthews	6 episodes
2018	The Bletchley Circle: San Francisco	Hailey Yarner	8 episodes
2018	No One Would Tell	Nikki Farrow	Television film
2019	Deadly Class	Sue Ann	3 episodes
2019	Another Life	Petra Smith	3 episodes
2019	Ride or Die	Kelly	Television film
2020	Poisoned Love: The Stacey Castor Story	Ashley	Television film
2020–2021	My Little Pony: Pony Life	Potion Nova / Zesty	4 episodes
2022	Under the Banner of Heaven	Debbie	Episode: "Blood Atonement"
2022	The Journey Ahead	Katie	Television film
2023	A Million Little Things	Celeste	Episode: "A Bird in the Hand"
2025	Happy Face	Adele	2 episodes

== Accolades ==
Awards	Year	Category	Work	Result
Canadian Screen Awards	2019	Supporting actress, drama	Poisoned Love: The Stacey Castor Story	Nominated
Young Artist Award	2013	Outstanding Young Ensemble in a TV Series	Incredible Crew	Nominated
