= Tipping the Velvet (TV series) =

British TV series

- Based on: Tipping the Velvet (1998) by Sarah Waters
- Written by: Andrew Davies
- Directed by: Geoffrey Sax
- Starring: Rachael Stirling; Keeley Hawes; Anna Chancellor; Jodhi May
- Music by: Adrian Johnston
- Country of origin: United Kingdom
- Original language: English
- No. of series: 1
- No. of episodes: 3

Production
- Producer: Georgina Lowe
- Cinematography: Cinders Forsha
- Editor: Kristina Hetherington
- Running time: 177 minutes (3 parts)

Original release
- Network: BBC Two
- Release: 9 October – 23 October 2002

Tipping the Velvet is a 2002 three-part BBC television drama serial based on the best-selling 1998 debut novel of the same name by Sarah Waters. It originally screened in three episodes on BBC Two and was produced for the BBC by the independent production company Sally Head Productions. It stars Rachael Stirling, Keeley Hawes, and Jodhi May.

Directed by Geoffrey Sax, the novel was adapted by screenwriter Andrew Davies. The production was made available on DVD by BBC Worldwide soon after broadcast.

== Background and development ==
The BBC had previously aired an adaptation of Oranges Are Not the Only Fruit in 1990 and some scenes in other dramas, but none had been so explicit in its depiction of lesbian sex. Sally Head Productions defended the decision to air the entire programme uncut. Waters was quite surprised that the BBC chose to produce and broadcast a television adaptation that faithfully followed the relish and detail of sexual escapades in the book. Stirling thoroughly enjoyed the role, despite her avowed heterosexuality: "To counteract any hard-core sex within it, there's a huge sense of humour and a huge sense of fun and frivolity and joy of life. It was so utterly believable that you never for a moment thought, 'fuck, there's no reason why I'm standing here naked'."

Screenwriter Andrew Davies said he was attracted to the story because it featured a girl transitioning into womanhood and it included his interests in Victorian erotica; he compared it to Pride and Prejudice—for which he wrote the BBC screenplay—"with dirty bits". Both Waters and Davies were concerned about the use of dildos in scenes with Diana, but the BBC allowed it.

Waters especially appreciated the way Davies interpreted Kitty's ambivalence about being in love with Nan. He wrote the line for her, "I hate the way you make me feel", which according to Waters crystallises Kitty's complicated emotions well. The music in the adaptation was written for the film. Waters wrote song titles but not lyrics in the music references in the novel. For one song, during Kitty and Nan's first performance in the adaptation, Davies wrote a composition that had Kitty show Nan—dressed and performing as brothers—how to pick up girls in the park. It involved Kitty teaching Nan how to kiss, which they do onstage in front of audiences who are watching women, dressed as men, who are in reality having an affair with each other beyond the view of the audience. Waters wrote a similar description as Nan compares their act to their relationship; their sexual encounters to their performance onstage, noting the irony that Kitty insisted on absolute secrecy yet there they performed in front of thousands: "You are too slow—you go too fast—not there, but here—that's good—that's better! It was as if we walked before the crimson curtain, lay down upon the boards and kissed and fondled—and were clapped, and cheered, and paid for it!"

== Cast ==
| Character | Episode 1 | Episode 2 | Episode 3 |
|---|---|---|---|
| Kitty Butler | Keeley Hawes | Keeley Hawes | Keeley Hawes |
| Nan Astley | Rachael Stirling | Rachael Stirling | Rachael Stirling |
| Gully Sutherland | Johnny Vegas | | |
| Mrs Milne | | Tilly Vosburgh | |
| Ralph Banner | | | Hugh Bonneville |
| Freddy | Benedict Cumberbatch | | |
| Mary | | Milly Gregory | |
| Diana Lethaby | | Anna Chancellor | Anna Chancellor |
| Dickie | | Sara Stockbridge | Sara Stockbridge |
| Davy Astley | Peter Kelly | | |
| Tony Reeves | Dean Lennox Kelly | | |
| Mrs Jex | | Janet Henfrey | Janet Henfrey |
| Mrs Sykes | | | Angela Curran |
| Elsie | | | Janet Fullerlove |
| Annie Price | | | Diane Beck |
| Walter Bliss | John Bowe | John Bowe | |
| Mrs Astley | Annie Hulley | | |
| Cyril | | | Louis Alderton |
| Zena Blake | | Sally Hawkins | Sally Hawkins |
| Mrs Denby | Bernice Stegers | Bernice Stegers | |
| Tricky Reeves | Jim McManus | | |
| Renter Alice | | Paul Ready | |
| Alice Astley | Monica Dolan | | |
| Grace Milne | | Heather Dickinson | |
| Bill | | David Webber | |
| Mr Astley | Richard Hope | | |
| Mrs Best | | Theresa Watson | |
| Jimmy Burns | Daniel Mays | | Daniel Mays |
| Florence Banner | | Jodhi May | Jodhi May |
| Charles Frobisher | Alexei Sayle | | Alexei Sayle |

== Filming locations ==
The production team visited Whitstable in Kent, where Nancy Astley (Rachael Stirling) lived with her family, before she left for London. Chatham Dockyard was used to double as London for the street scenes.
