= Boy Meets Girl (2009 TV series) =

British television series

- Genre: Comedy drama Fantasy
- Written by: David Allison
- Starring: Rachael Stirling; Martin Freeman; Angela Griffin; Paterson Joseph; Marshall Lancaster; James Lance
- Composer: David A. Hughes
- Country of origin: United Kingdom
- Original language: English
- No. of series: 1
- No. of episodes: 4

Production
- Cinematography: Sean Van Hales
- Editor: Anthony Combes
- Running time: approx. 43 minutes

Original release
- Network: ITV
- Release: 1 May – 22 May 2009

Boy Meets Girl is an ITV comedy-drama television miniseries starring Rachael Stirling and Martin Freeman. In the show, Danny Reed (Freeman) is struck by lightning. When he wakes up from the attack, he is inside the body of a woman, fashion journalist Veronica Burton (Stirling). Written by David Allison, the series began on 1 May 2009.

== Synopsis ==
Danny Reed (Martin Freeman) is directionless and dissatisfied with his lot in life. Working at a DIY superstore, he vents his frustrations on the customers when not pining for his co-worker Fiona (Angela Griffin), or foisting his encyclopedic knowledge of useless information onto loyal friend Pete (Marshall Lancaster). He is a world away from the successful and vivacious Veronica (Rachael Stirling), whose job as a glamorous fashion journalist provides her with a well-stocked bank account and an even better-stocked social calendar. Worshipped by her devoted boyfriend, Jay (Paterson Joseph), Veronica seems to have it all. When a freak accident traps the mismatched strangers in each other's bodies, the results are not pretty.

As Danny and Veronica struggle with their new identities they begin to discover new truths about themselves. But besides learning to walk in high heels or being forced to 'slum it' with the working classes, the pair long to get back to their own bodies and, ultimately, their old lives.

== Cast ==
Character	Actor/Actress
Veronica Burton	Rachael Stirling
Danny Reed	Martin Freeman
Jay Metcalfe	Paterson Joseph
Fiona	Angela Griffin
Pete	Marshall Lancaster
Ali	James Lance
Siobhan	Tamzin Malleson
Jenny	Lisa Millett
Bill	Peter Wight
Malcolm	Stuart McGugan

== Episodes ==
Ep.	Title	Airdate	Overview
1	Part 1	1 May 2009	Danny is a young slob with sincere socialist views who works in a D-I-Y megastore with Pete and Fiona, (whom he has a crush on). Veronica is a fashion writer for the local paper who lives with her partner Jay in an expensive flat. Owing money, Danny steals some copper wire from a sub-station and runs across Veronica, who has run out of petrol, and they are both struck by lightning. Danny comes to in Veronica's body two days later in hospital. Jay is shocked by "Veronica's" slovenliness, frigidity and hostility but is determined to help her return to her old pre-accident self. Danny goes to Veronica's work and detests fashion wanting to do political reporting but she is dismissed as just someone who looks good in a skirt. "Veronica" visits Danny's flat and the store trying to contact Danny, but is considered weird. Fiona later contacts "Veronica" for help finding the still missing Danny, whom "Veronica" thinks may be confused and homeless. Meanwhile, Veronica, in Danny's body, has lost her memory, is sleeping rough and is asking strangers for help convinced that she used to be a woman. After seeing Veronica's column she has flashbacks of her former life and tries to ring "Veronica" at the paper but fails to reach her. She tries to make an appeal in front of a TV camera on the street, which Danny sees, but is arrested.
2	Part 2	8 May 2009	Danny misses Veronica at the police station so he registers himself on a missing persons website. Pete still suspicious of "Veronica" confronts her and then goes to the police. The police question 'Veronica' at work over Danny's disappearance and she tells the police that they had him this morning but let him go. Fiona and "Veronica" seem to be getting on well but he can't tell her that she is really Danny. Pete and Fiona go to see the criminal Barry, whose van Danny used for the theft, and discover another link to the accident with the powerlines. Pete makes a pass at Fiona but she rebuffs him. "Danny" fails to convince Siobhan that she is really Veronica and starts watching "Veronica" who he believes has stolen her life. He goes to see Jay but he is freaked out by all the personal details about him "Danny" knows and has her arrested. Danny has been struggling at pulling off being "Veronica" and her work at the paper and he discovers Veronica may not have been as happy there as she seemed. He is given one last chance at a fashion show where he gets drunk and causes a scene by attacking fashion and women. He tells Veronica's friend Siobhan she is weak for staying with her unfaithful boyfriend Ali, (whom he knows Veronica was having an affair with). Back at the flat, a drunk, confused and miserable Danny allows Jay to seduce her.
3	Part 3	15 May 2009	Siobhan dumps Ali and he tries reuniting with "Veronica". Danny is fed up with being Veronica and wants to be a man. She fails to convince Pete that she is really Danny. At the paper "Veronica" is fired and breaks down claiming she is really a man named Danny and is shipped off to a mental hospital. "Danny" has been sent there too by the police and their doctors believe they are both suffering from a shared delusion that they have switched personalities. Veronica learns her name is now Danny Reed and escapes. Danny spots him and chases after but is caught. Danny meets Veronica's working-class parents whom she has shunned. Jay and Siobhan talk about helping Veronica and Siobhan gets drunk and tries to kiss Jay. Rebuffed, she goes back to Ali. Threatened with ECT, which he has before, Danny is terrified that he will lose his memory and come to believe he really is Veronica. He admits he was confused after the accident but has recovered and is released. He is determined to pull off being Veronica to stay out of the hospital. He begs for Veroncia's job back at the paper and goes home with Jay who proposes to her, at which point Fiona turns up see if "Veronica" is okay. Veronica steps outside to talk to Fiona who admits she really likes "Veronica". Danny says that's okay he has been thinking about her a lot too and they kiss.
4	Part 4	22 May 2009	Jay is planning their wedding but "Veronica" is only interested seeing Fiona and gets caught by Siobhan. "Danny" is researching how to swap their bodies back when he is abducted by Barry and forced to rob a worker depositing takings. "Veronica" stumbles across the robbery, grabs "Danny", and they flee while Barry tries to grab the money and is arrested. So they finally meet and talk. Veronica wants to get electrocuted, anything to swap back, but Danny refuses saying it is too dangerous. He tells Veronica where his flat is and Veronica goes there but finds it is a dump and that Danny has been evicted. "Veronica" has finally convinced Pete that she is really Danny and Pete convinces Danny that taking over Veronica's life and lying to Fiona is wrong. "Veronica" and Fiona agree that their affair has changed them both for the better but "Veronica" says they have to break up. Everything blows up at Jay's surprise engagement party and Danny again wants out of Veronica's life. "Danny" turns up and grabs "Veronica" and drags her to the substation because a storm is coming. They are electrocuted and swap back. Veronica tells Jay she can't do this any more. Danny leaves town with Pete determined to make something more of his life.

== Ratings ==
Episode number	Original airing on ITV	Time of airing on ITV	Position in ITV's rating
1	Friday, 1 May 2009	9.00pm	3.78 million
2	Friday, 8 May 2009	9.00pm	2.44 million
3	Friday, 15 May 2009	9.00pm	2.25 million
4	Friday, 22 May 2009	9.00pm	2.83 million

== DVD release ==
The series was released on 25 May 2009. The front cover is a photo of Danny and Veronica sitting on a park bench, looking at each other in confusion. Above them is the logo for the show. And the slogan below it reads "ever had one of those days when you're not feeling yourself?". The age certificate for the DVD is 15.
