= Barbie and the Secret Door =

- DVD cover
- Directed by: Karen J. Lloyd
- Written by: Brian Hohlfeld
- Produced by: Melissa Lee Anderson; Shelley Dvi-Vardhana
- Starring: Kelly Sheridan; Brittany McDonald; Chanelle Peloso; Ashleigh Ball; Tabitha St. Germain; Andrea Libman
- Edited by: David Hall
- Music by: Rebecca Kneubuhl; Gabriel Mann
- Production companies: Mattel Playground Productions; Rainmaker Entertainment
- Distributed by: Universal Studios Home Entertainment
- Release date: August 7, 2014
- Running time: 81 minutes
- Countries: Canada; United States
- Language: English
- Box office: $2 million

Barbie and the Secret Door is a 2014 CGI-animated musical fantasy film. It was released to DVD on September 16, 2014, and made its television debut on Nickelodeon on November 23, 2014.

This film is the 28th entry in the Barbie film series. It was directed by Karen Lloyd and features the voice of Kelly Sheridan as Princess Alexa, a shy princess who discovers a secret door in her kingdom and enters a magical world. It was given a limited theatrical release overseas, grossing $2 million.

== Plot ==
Alexa is a shy princess of a modern-day kingdom who avoids doing the duties expected of her due to her shyness. In order to encourage her, Alexa's grandmother gives her a storybook about a princess who discovers she has magic. While reading the book, Alexa discovers a secret door in the royal gardens. She enters the door and finds herself in a magical land. Her dress changes and a magic wand appears in her hair.

Alexa meets Nori, a fairy missing her wings, and Romy, a mermaid with legs instead of her tail. Nori and Romy are thrilled because they believe Alexa, as a princess, can solve their problems with her magic. Their realm is under threat by the mean, mischievous Princess Malucia, a spoiled child princess who was born without magic and has been taking it by force from all the creatures she can capture. Alexa is brought to the glade where fairies, mermaids, and unicorns are hiding from Malucia. There, Alexa slowly learns to use her wand. However, she cannot return Nori and Romy to their original forms, because their magic is trapped in Malucia's scepter.

The group learns that Malucia is trying to find the Queen Unicorn, who is the most magical creature in the realm. Alexa, Nori, and Romy travel to the Queen Unicorn, hoping to protect her, only to unintentionally lead Malucia and her minions right to her. Malucia captures the Queen Unicorn, while Nori and Romy provide a distraction so that Alexa can escape. While fleeing, Alexa discovers the doorway back to her world but decides to stay and help.

Alexa, Nori, and Romy go to Malucia's palace, where they witness Malucia draining all the unicorns' magic into her scepter. Alexa confronts Malucia, declaring that she is a princess, too, which provokes Malucia into a magical battle to "prove" who is the better princess. During the fight, Alexa realizes that Malucia's scepter is cracking under its magical content. Alexa willingly lets Malucia steal all her magic, which causes Malucia's scepter to explode, releasing all its magic and magically changing Alexa's dress into a new princess gown. Malucia is harmless once again, and Alexa, who can now perform magic without a wand, returns all the magic to their rightful owners.

After promising to visit again soon, Alexa returns to her kingdom more confident and more willing to participate in her princess duties. As for Malucia, her parents return from their holiday and scold her for trying to take over the kingdom again.

== Voice cast ==
Voice cast as listed in the closing credits:

- Kelly Sheridan as Princess Alexa, Barbie's character: A formerly shy reader who discovers the secret door and saves Zinnia.
- Brittany McDonald as the singing voice of Princess Alexa
- Ashleigh Ball as Nori (played by Teresa), a fairy who befriends Alexa.
- Chanelle Peloso as Romy (played by Summer), a clumsy mermaid who also befriends Alexa.
- Tabitha St. Germain as Malucia, a greedy and arrogant little girl who wants to take over Zinnia and steals people's magic.
- Ellie King as Grandmother, whose book leads Alexa to the door.
- Christopher Gaze as Brookhurst, Alexa's butler.
- Jonathan Holmes as Grodlin, the trog who is put in charge of being Malucia's babysitter.
- Britt Irvin as Jenna, a black girl and friend of Alexa.
- Michael Daingerfield as King of Zinnia, Malucia's father.
- Mackenzie Gray as Father
- Andrea Libman as Nola, a fairy Malucia steals wings from.
- Anna Galvin as Mother
- Andrew Francis as Prince Kieran, a foreign prince from Hilgovia who is a friend of Alexa.
- Jay Brazeau as Mr. Primrose, the dance teacher.
- Teryl Rothery as Queen of Zinnia, Malucia's mother.
- Arielle Tuliao as Samantha, a Japanese-Taiwanese girl and friend of Alexa.
- Peter Kelamis as Sniff, one of the sniffers.
- Richard Ian Cox as Whiff, Sniff's brother.
- Ali Liebert as Youngling Fairy

== Soundtrack ==
A soundtrack for the film was released on August 25, 2014, a week after the film's release on video. The soundtrack's track list is as follows:

1. "What's Gonna Happen" – Brittany McDonald (Alexa)
2. "If I Had Magic" – Brittany McDonald (Alexa)
3. "Magic Door" (Score)
4. "You're Here" – Ashleigh Ball (Nori) and Chanelle Peloso (Romy)
5. "I Want it All" – Tabitha St. Germain (Malucia)
6. "I've Got Magic" – Brittany McDonald (Alexa)
7. "Unicorn" (Score)
8. "We've Got Magic" – Ashleigh Ball (Nori) and Chanelle Peloso (Romy)
9. "Return to the Castle" (Score)
10. "What's Gonna Happen" (Reprise) – Brittany McDonald (Alexa)

== See also ==
- List of Barbie films
