= The Spider Within: A Spider-Verse Story =

2023 animated thriller short film

- Logo
- Directed by: Jarelle Dampier
- Screenplay by: Khaila Amazan
- Based on: Marvel Comics
- Produced by: Michelle Raimo Kouyate; David Schulenburg
- Starring: Shameik Moore; Brian Tyree Henry
- Edited by: Arthur D. Noda
- Production companies: Marvel Entertainment; Sony Pictures Animation; Sony Pictures Imageworks
- Distributed by: Columbia Pictures
- Release dates: June 12, 2023 (Annecy); March 27, 2024 (YouTube)
- Running time: 7 minutes
- Country: United States
- Language: English

The Spider Within: A Spider-Verse Story is a 2023 American animated psychological thriller short film featuring the Marvel Comics character Miles Morales (voiced by Shameik Moore) and produced by Sony Pictures Animation and Sony Pictures Imageworks. Taking place between Spider-Man: Into the Spider-Verse (2018) and Spider-Man: Across the Spider-Verse (2023), the short, directed by Jarelle Dampier and written by Khaila Amazan, is described as focusing on Morales when he "starts to feel the pressure of his life as Spider-Man, which results in a scary, trippy, shroomy little jaunt through his subconscious".

The film was produced under presented by Sony Pictures Animation in association with Marvel Entertainment through Sony's LENS program, and premiered at the Annecy International Animation Film Festival on June 12, 2023. While debuting the short, Sony did not disclose how or when they intend to release it to a wider audience. It was later released on YouTube on March 27, 2024, ahead of the originally planned release date of Spider-Man: Beyond the Spider-Verse (2027). The YouTube release was partnered with a fundraiser for the Kevin Love Fund.

== Synopsis ==
After returning home from a day of crime fighting, Miles Morales is haunted by the thoughts of his parents arguing with him and the new responsibilities he must embrace. His father, Jefferson Davis, asks if he wants to watch horror movies with him, but a tired Miles tells him some other time. As he tries to relax in his room, he is accosted by his fears, manifesting as a black silhouetted and yellow eyed being. Miles attempts to fight this creature which transforms into a large spider (resulting in Miles promising not to step on any more spiders again), and later a huge infestation of smaller spiders. A frightened Miles cowers as his visions go away. Finally at ease, Miles leaves his room and asks his father if he would like to walk with him. The two leave the apartment and begin having a friendly conversation.

== Cast ==
- Shameik Moore as Miles Morales / Spider-Man:
  An intelligent and rebellious teenage graffiti artist of African-American and Puerto Rican descent having taken over as the Spider-Man of Earth-1610 since his reality's Peter Parker (publicly known as "Spider-Man #2") was killed by the Kingpin.
- Brian Tyree Henry as Jefferson Davis: Miles' African-American father and a police officer.

== Reception ==
Ross Bonaime wrote for Collider.com that "despite Miles (understandably) getting attacked by a giant spider, and then hundreds of smaller spiders, Dampier captures that suffocating feeling of being overwhelmed in a relatable way," and compared the short's depiction of Miles' mental health favorably to depictions of prior Spider-Man characters.
