= Leslie Margolis =

American writer

- Occupations: Author; novelist
- Writing career
- Genre: Children's literature
- Website: www.lesliemargolis.com

Leslie Margolis is an American author and novelist, whose works are more targeted towards children. Her book, Boys Are Dogs, was adapted into a film entitled Zapped, by Disney. She currently lives in Los Angeles, California.

== Bibliography ==
=== Annabelle Unleashed series ===
This five-part series includes:

1. Boys Are Dogs published in 2008 and adapted into audio book format.
  - adapted into the Disney Channel Original Movie titled Zapped starring Zendaya and Spencer Boldman 2014
2. Girls Acting Catty published in 2009
3. Everybody Bugs Out published in 2011
4. One Tough Chick published in 2013
5. Monkey Business published September 2014

=== Maggie Brooklyn Mystery series ===
1. Girl's Best Friend published in 2010
2. Vanishing Acts published in 2012
3. Secrets at the Chocolate Mansion published in 2013

=== Stand-alone novels ===
1. Fix published 3 October 2006
2. Price of Admission published 1 February 2007
3. If I Were You published 12 May 2015
4. We Are Party People published 3 October 2017
5. Ghosted published 23 October 2018

=== Co-operative projects ===
1. 21 Proms published 1 March 2007
2. First Kiss (Then Tell) published 1 December 2007
3. Lucky Dog: Twelve Tales of Rescued Dogs published in 2014
