= Incredible Crew =

American sketch comedy television series

- Genre: Sketch comedy Surreal humor
- Created by: Nick Cannon
- Written by: Alejandro Bien-Willner; Heather Anne Campbell; Mikey Day; Eric Scott; Scott Tomlinson
- Directed by: Danny J. Boyle
- Starring: Shauna Case; Shameik Moore; Tristan Pasterick; Chanelle Peloso; Jeremy Shada; Brandon Soo Hoo
- Composers: Nick Cannon; Kevin Writer
- Country of origin: United States
- Original language: English
- No. of seasons: 1
- No. of episodes: 13

Production
- Executive producers: Nick Cannon; Michael Goldman; Scott Tomlinson; Brian A. Miller (Note: executive producer for Alive and Kicking, Inc.); Mark Costa; Walter J. Newman (Note: executive producer for Cartoon Network Studios); Rob Sorcher
- Producers: Cathy A. Cambria; Karen Mayeda-Vranek (Note: co-producer); Mikey Day (Note: supervising producer)
- Cinematography: Byron Shah
- Editors: Cortney Carrillo; Steve Rasch; Jeremy Reuben
- Running time: 22 minutes
- Production companies: N'Credible Entertainment; Cartoon Network Studios

Original release
- Network: Cartoon Network
- Release: December 31, 2012 – April 11, 2013

Incredible Crew is an American sketch comedy television series, created by Nick Cannon for Cartoon Network. Cannon filmed the pilot in late 2011 as originally Class Clowns and was later greenlit with its finalized name, and the series aired as a sneak peek on December 31, 2012 to April 11, 2013, featuring a 22-minute run time.

This was the final live-action show produced by Cartoon Network Studios.

== Plot ==
Incredible Crew is a live-action sketch comedy series from producer and entertainer Nick Cannon. Episodes consist of short-form surreal comedy acts, hidden camera pranks, original music videos, and commercial parodies using non-sequitur humor. Incredible Crew casts six young comedy stars: Shauna Case (American Horror Story), Shameik Moore (Spider-Man: Across The Spider-Verse), Tristan Pasterick (guest star, I'm in the Band), Chanelle Peloso (Level Up), Jeremy Shada (Adventure Time), and Brandon Soo Hoo (Supah Ninjas). Nick Cannon serves as executive producer of Incredible Crew along with Michael Goldman and Scott Tomlinson. Cartoon Network Studios produced the series in association with N'Credible Entertainment.

=== Sketches ===
According to Michael Goldman and Scott Tomlinson, over 330 sketches were created and carefully selected for each episode.

== Cast ==
=== Principal cast ===
- Nick Cannon as Announcer
- Shauna Case as Herself, Various
- Shameik Moore as Himself, Various
- Tristan Pasterick as Himself, Various
- Chanelle Peloso as Herself, Various
- Jeremy Shada as Himself, Various
- Brandon Soo Hoo as Himself, Various

=== Recurring cast ===
- Benton Jennings as Krumping High School Principal
- Rachel O'Meara as Various
- Justin Tinucci as Justin, Performer
- Jillian "Jill" Moray as Mother, Teacher
- Stephanie Jackson as Mom
- Barbara Kerford as Mom
- Nicholas "Nick" Leland as Various
- Lawrence "Larry" Morgan as Dad
- Cassandra Braden as Mrs. Hall
- Lawrence Mandley as Referee

== Episodes ==
| Season | Episodes | Originally released | |
| Season | Episodes | First released | Last released |
|---|---|---|---|
| Pilot | | November 2011 | |
| 1 | 13 | January 24, 2013 | April 11, 2013 |

=== Pilot (2011) ===
| Title | Original release date |
|---|---|
| "Class Clowns" | November 2011 |

=== Season 1 (2013) ===
| No. | Title | Original release date | Prod. code | US viewers (millions) |
|---|---|---|---|---|
| 1 | "Farting Grandpa" | January 24, 2013 | 101 | 1.61 |
Songs: "Running Errands With My Mom", "Doing Something Fun While Doing Something Boring", "Doug High" Guest star: Annie Sertich
| 2 | "Lunch Boxing" | January 24, 2013 | 102 | 1.91 |
Song: "New Kid" Special guest stars: New Boyz
| 3 | "Magical Video Game Controller" | January 31, 2013 | 103 | 1.59 |
Songs: "Heavy Metal Science Fair", "Complecatrix" Guest star: James Hong
| 4 | "Candy Deodorant" | February 7, 2013 | 104 | 1.36 |
Song: "So Stylin'"
| 5 | "Remote Control Broccoli" | February 11, 2013 | 105 | 1.39 |
Songs: "Bad Haircuts", "Hey Hey Check It Out" Guest star: Mindy Sterling Note: This was the third episode to air on a Monday, right after the Hall of Game Awards (as a special). This was the only episode that has its name at the beginning of the show.
| 6 | "Cheat Sheet Tacos" | February 14, 2013 | 106 | 1.22 |
Song: "Questions Before Bed"
| 7 | "Super Duper Gross Things" | February 21, 2013 | 107 | 1.59 |
Songs: "Super Duper Gross Things", "Shark Tooth Terry", "Adults Using Toy Versions of Things"
| 8 | "Pancake Genie" | February 28, 2013 | 108 | 1.55 |
Song: "AJ Boy Bander"
| 9 | "Face Jeans" | March 7, 2013 | 109 | 1.55 |
Song: "Bad Luck Rap"
| 10 | "Rodney Tape Face" | March 14, 2013 | 110 | 1.57 |
Song: "Reading Is Fun"
| 11 | "Bunk Bed Mountain" | March 21, 2013 | 111 | 1.52 |
Song: "Putting Shaving Cream On Stuff"
| 12 | "Cardboard Robot vs. Tinfoil Lizard" | April 4, 2013 | 112 | 1.62 |
Songs: "Teachers' Lounge", "I Like Stickers" Special guest star: E-40
| 13 | "Manners Shark" | April 11, 2013 | 113 | 1.73 |
Song: "So What!"

== Reception ==
Emily Ashby from Common Sense Media gave the show 3 stars and said that "Nick Cannon's mild sketch comedy will entertain kids," and that it "makes the most of clever writing and a well-rounded cast."

== Accolades ==
| Year | Award | Category | Recipient | Result | Ref. |
|---|---|---|---|---|---|
| 2013 | Young Artist Award | Outstanding Young Ensemble in a TV Series | Shauna Case, Shameik Moore, Tristan Pasterick, Chanelle Peloso, Jeremy Shada, Brandon Soo Hoo | Nominated | |

== Music ==
In conjunction with the show's music, WaterTower Music released two soundtrack albums based on the first season of the show. The first album, Incredible Crew: Music From the Television Show (Vol. 1), was released on March 5, 2013, and the second, Incredible Crew: Music From the Television Show (Vol. 2), was released on April 23, 2013. Both soundtracks were available to download via iTunes. The show's music was composed by Nick Cannon and Kevin Writer.

=== Track listing for Volume 1 ===
| No. | Title | Lyrics | Music | Artist | Length |
|---|---|---|---|---|---|
| 1. | "Incredible Crew (Main Theme)" | Nick Cannon | Nick Cannon, Kevin Writer | Nick Cannon | 0:20 |
| 2. | "Running Errands with My Mom" (seen on "Farting Grandpa") | Nick Cannon | Nick Cannon, Kevin Writer | Jeremy Shada, Shauna Case and Annie Sertich | 2:23 |
| 3. | "Doing Something Fun While Doing Something Boring" (seen on "Farting Grandpa") | Nick Cannon | Nick Cannon, Kevin Writer | Tristan Pasterick | 0:58 |
| 4. | "Heavy Metal Science Fair" (seen on "Magical Video Game Controller") | Nick Cannon | Nick Cannon, Kevin Writer | Tristan Pasterick | 1:39 |
| 5. | "So Stylin'" (seen on "Candy Deodorant") | Nick Cannon | Nick Cannon, Kevin Writer | Shameik Moore | 2:39 |
| 6. | "Bad Haircuts" (seen on "Remote Control Broccoli") | Nick Cannon | Nick Cannon, Kevin Writer | Jeremy Shada, Shauna Case and Brandon Soo Hoo | 1:21 |
| 7. | "Leggings" (seen on "Remote Control Broccoli") | Nick Cannon | Nick Cannon, Kevin Writer | Tristan Pasterick | 0:53 |
| 8. | "Questions Before Bed" (seen on "Cheat Sheet Tacos") | Nick Cannon | Nick Cannon, Kevin Writer | Chanelle Peloso, Jeremy Shada, Shauna Case and Tristan Pasterick | 2:41 |
| 9. | "Super Duper Gross Things" (seen on "Super Duper Gross Things") | Nick Cannon | Nick Cannon, Kevin Writer | Shauna Case | 1:03 |
| Total length: | | | | | 00:13:57 |

=== Track listing for Volume 2 ===
| No. | Title | Lyrics | Music | Artist | Length |
|---|---|---|---|---|---|
| 1. | "AJ Boy Bander" (seen on "Pancake Genie") | Nick Cannon | Nick Cannon, Kevin Writer | Jeremy Shada, Chanelle Peloso & Shauna Case | 2:26 |
| 2. | "Bad Luck Rap" (seen on "Face Jeans") | Nick Cannon | Nick Cannon, Kevin Writer | Shameik Moore, Brandon Soo Hoo, Tristan Pasterick & Shauna Case | 1:46 |
| 3. | "New Kid" (seen on "Lunch Boxing") | Nick Cannon | Nick Cannon, Kevin Writer | Brandon Soo Hoo & The New Boyz | 2:43 |
| 4. | "Reading is Fun" (seen on "Rodney Tape Face") | Nick Cannon | Nick Cannon, Kevin Writer | Tristan Pasterick | 1:43 |
| 5. | "Putting Shaving Cream on Stuff" (seen on "Bunk Bed Mountain") | Nick Cannon | Nick Cannon, Kevin Writer | Jeremy Shada, Tristan Pasterick & Chanelle Peloso | 2:10 |
| 6. | "Teacher's Lounge" (seen on "Cardboard Robot vs. Tinfoil Lizard") | Nick Cannon | Nick Cannon, Kevin Writer | Jeremy Shada & E-40 | 1:30 |
| 7. | "Stickers" (seen on "Cardboard Robot vs. Tinfoil Lizard") | Nick Cannon | Nick Cannon, Kevin Writer | Chanelle Peloso | 1:36 |
| 8. | "So What?!" (seen on "Manners Shark") | Nick Cannon | Nick Cannon, Kevin Writer | Tristan Pasterick | 1:35 |
| Total length: | | | | | 00:15:29 |

== Cancellation ==
On July 29, 2013, the series was cancelled after one season, mostly due to low ratings. Reruns aired on the network until November 23, 2014.

== See also ==
- All That
- The Amanda Show
- So Random!
