= Futurists (play) =

Futurists is a 1986 play by British playwright Dusty Hughes. It was first produced at the Cottesloe, Royal National Theatre, directed by Richard Eyre.
