= James McAvoy =

Scottish actor (born 1979)

- McAvoy at the 2026 Toronto Film Festival
- Born: 21 April 1979 (age 47); Glasgow, Scotland
- Education: Royal Conservatoire of Scotland (BA)
- Occupations: Actor; director
- Years active: 1995–present
- Works: Full list
- Spouses: Anne-Marie Duff (m. 2006; div. 2016); Lisa Liberati (m. 2022)
- Children: 2
- Relatives: Joy McAvoy (sister)

James McAvoy (/ˈmækəvɔɪ/; born 21 April 1979) is a Scottish actor and director. He made his acting debut as a teenager in The Near Room (1995) and appeared mostly on television until 2003, when his film career began. His television work includes the thriller State of Play (2003), the science fiction miniseries Frank Herbert's Children of Dune (2003), and the drama series Shameless (2004–2005).

McAvoy gained recognition for playing Mr. Tumnus in the fantasy film The Chronicles of Narnia: The Lion, the Witch and the Wardrobe (2005) and an assassin in the action film Wanted (2008). After winning the inaugural BAFTA Rising Star Award in 2006, his performances in the period dramas The Last King of Scotland (2006) and Atonement (2007) gained him BAFTA Award nominations. In 2011 he voiced the title characters in Arthur Christmas and Gnomeo & Juliet, and portrayed Charles Xavier in the superhero film X-Men: First Class, a role he reprised in four subsequent installments of the X-Men series.

McAvoy gained praise for starring in the independent crime film Filth (2013), and appeared as a superpowered man with 23 dissociative identities in M. Night Shyamalan's Split (2016) and its successor Glass (2019). He portrayed Lord Asriel in the fantasy series His Dark Materials from 2019 to 2022, and starred as Bill Denbrough in the horror film It Chapter Two (2019). In the 2020s, McAvoy starred in the horror film Speak No Evil (2024), and made his directorial debut with California Schemin' (2025).

On stage, McAvoy has performed in several West End productions, such as Three Days of Rain in 2010, Macbeth in 2013, The Ruling Class in 2015, and Cyrano de Bergerac in 2020, for which he received four nominations for the Laurence Olivier Award for Best Actor.

== Early life ==
James McAvoy was born on 21 April 1979 in Glasgow, to bus-driver-turned-builder James McAvoy Sr. and psychiatric nurse Elizabeth (née Johnstone; died 2018). He was brought up as a Roman Catholic. His parents separated when he was seven and divorced when he was 11. McAvoy's mother suffered from poor health and subsequently sent him to live with his maternal grandparents, Mary and James Johnstone, in the nearby Drumchapel area of Glasgow. His mother lived with them intermittently. McAvoy has a younger sister named Joy and a younger half-brother named Donald. He confirmed in an interview with The Guardian that both his parents were deceased, but he had not been in contact with his father since childhood. He attended the Catholic St Thomas Aquinas Secondary School in the Jordanhill area of Glasgow and briefly considered joining the priesthood. In a 2006 interview, McAvoy said he considered becoming a priest as a child because it seemed to be a way to explore the world through missionary work. During his education, he worked at a local bakery.

McAvoy applied to join the Royal Navy and had already been accepted when he was also offered a place to study acting at the Royal Scottish Academy of Music and Drama (RSAMD, now the Royal Conservatoire of Scotland). After graduating in 2000, he moved to London.

== Career ==
=== Early work ===
When McAvoy was 15, his English teacher's next door neighbour David Hayman visited his school to give a talk about Macbeth. Recognizing Hayman from his film roles, McAvoy expressed interest in getting a job on Hayman's next project for work experience purposes. Six months later, Hayman summoned McAvoy and asked him to read the script and audition for The Near Room (1995) in which he made his acting debut. He later admitted that he was not very interested in acting when joining the film, but was inspired to study acting after developing feelings for his co-star, Alana Brady. He continued to act while still a member of PACE Youth Theatre. McAvoy graduated from the Royal Scottish Academy of Music and Drama in 2000. Throughout the early 2000s, he made guest appearances in television shows and began working in film. In 2001, McAvoy's performance as a gay hustler in the play Out in the Open impressed director Joe Wright so much that Wright began offering McAvoy parts in his films. McAvoy kept declining them, however, and it was not until six years later that the two worked together.

He appeared in Privates on Parade in the Donmar Warehouse, where he was noticed by Sam Mendes. In 2001, the actor appeared as Private James W. Miller in Band of Brothers, an eleven-hour World War II miniseries by executive producers Steven Spielberg and Tom Hanks. He gained the attention of critics in 2002's White Teeth, a four-part television drama miniseries adaption based on the novel of the same name by Zadie Smith. In 2022, McAvoy commented that Smith "didn't say [he] was bad at playing the part". She told him he "was the wrong casting, because [he] was too little – the character should have been more overweight."

In 2003, McAvoy appeared in the Sci Fi Channel miniseries Frank Herbert's Children of Dune, adapted from Frank Herbert's novels. He then accepted the role of an unprincipled reporter in 2003's State of Play. The six-part drama serial tells the story of a newspaper's investigation into the death of a young woman and was broadcast on BBC One. Calling the programme a "must-see", the Chicago Tribune recommended State of Play for its cast's performance. In 2002, McAvoy shot scenes for Bollywood Queen, described as West Side Story meets Romeo and Juliet with bindis, it was shown as a special presentation at the 2003 Sundance Film Festival and opened in UK cinemas on 17 October.

In 2004, he acted in the romantic comedy Wimbledon. His next project was voicing a character named Hal in the 2004 English version of Strings, a mythic fantasy film. Another 2004 release for him was Inside I'm Dancing, an Irish production directed by Damien O'Donnell starring alongside Steven Robertson. In it, he was cast as one of the two principal characters: a maverick with duchenne muscular dystrophy. McAvoy ended 2004 by appearing in the first two series of Shameless as Steve McBride.

=== 2000s ===
In 2005, he appeared in Walt Disney Pictures's The Chronicles of Narnia: The Lion, the Witch and the Wardrobe, made by Andrew Adamson and based on C. S. Lewis's children's novel. He appeared as Tumnus, a faun who befriends Lucy Pevensie (played by Georgie Henley) and joins Aslan (Liam Neeson)'s forces. It was given a UK release of 9 December. At the UK box office, the film opened at number one, earning around £8.7 million at 498 cinemas over the weekend. Worldwide, Narnia grossed £463 million. As part of the BBC Drama ShakespeaRe-Told series of four updated plays in November 2005, he took the title role 'Joe Macbeth' - the chef of a Michelin-star restaurant.

In 2006 he accepted the role of Brian Jackson, a nerdy university student who wins a place on a University Challenge quiz team in the mid-1980s, in Starter for 10. He was directed by David Nicholls, who adapted the film's screenplay from his own book. The British-American production was given distribution in the UK on 10 November. In spite of the positive buzz, the film flopped at the box office, unable to recover its production costs of £5.7 million.

Forest Whitaker had suggested McAvoy to director Kevin Macdonald for the role of Nicholas Garrigan in 2006's low-budgeted The Last King of Scotland. McAvoy portrayed a Scottish doctor who becomes the personal physician to dictator Idi Amin (played by Whitaker) while in Uganda. While the film is based on factual events of Amin's rule, the details of the story and the character McAvoy played are fictional and adapted from Giles Foden's 1998 novel. McAvoy assessed his character to be a "completely selfish prick". McAvoy was named Best Actor of the year by Scotland's own BAFTA Awards, where the film swept the major categories, and received a nomination for the BAFTA Award for Best Actor in a Supporting Role. The film received three awards, including the Outstanding British Film of the Year.

Following that, he played Irish attorney Tom Lefroy and love-interest to Jane Austen in Becoming Jane, a 2007 historical film inspired by the author's early life. Next up was Penelope, which premiered at the 2006 Toronto International Film Festival. Also starring Christina Ricci, it generated polarised reviews. The breakthrough role in McAvoy's career came in Atonement, Joe Wright's 2007 adaptation of Ian McEwan's novel of the same title. A romantic war film, it focuses on lovers Cecilia and Robbie's (Keira Knightley and McAvoy) lives being torn apart after her jealous younger sister Briony (Saoirse Ronan) falsely accuses him of rape. Upon reading the script, McAvoy said he thought "If I don't get the part I'm not reading the book because it'll be devastating. It's an amazing role and I really wanted it." McAvoy has called the film "incredibly sad" but considers it an uplifting experience. He also shared that he hoped viewers will be left "absolutely devastated and harrowed". Screenings of Atonement were held at the 2007 Toronto International Film Festival, where it was one of the most acclaimed films present, and Venice Film Festival. Atonement was a big awards contender; it was nominated for fourteen BAFTAs and seven Academy Awards. Both McAvoy and Knightley were nominated for their performances at the 65th Golden Globe Awards, respectively. The Hollywood Reporter writer Ray Bennett said the duo gave "compelling and charismatic performances". In December 2022, McAvoy stated that McEwan was not entirely satisfied with his casting as Robbie in Atonement. "He wasn't disparaging. He just gave me… nothing. And I was a bit devastated. Then he said I was a bit small – because my character, Robbie, was meant to be this 6ft tanned Adonis, and I was a 25-year-old pasty Glaswegian who's 5ft-nothing."

His next role saw McAvoy appear with Angelina Jolie and Morgan Freeman in Wanted (2008), an action film where he portrayed Wesley Gibson, a young American slacker who learns he is heir to a legacy of assassins. When McAvoy screen-tested for the role, he was initially rejected because the studio was seeking an actor with conventional Hollywood leading-man looks and physique. He later recalled being considered the "runt of the litter" of those who tested, but ultimately got the role in late 2006 since the studio "wanted someone geeky". While shooting action scenes for Wanted, he suffered several injuries, including a twisted ankle and an injured knee. Nonetheless, the actor said he had a "good time" whilst making the film. McAvoy had not previously done this type of genre, and thought of Wanted as a chance to be more versatile.

Loosely based on the comic book miniseries of the same name by Mark Millar, it saw a June 2008 release worldwide. It received favourable reviews from the press, who generally liked that it was fast-paced. At the box office, Wanted was a success, grossing $341 million against a $75 million production budget. Next was The Last Station (2009), a biopic that details the final months of celebrated writer Leo Tolstoy and also stars Anne-Marie Duff, McAvoy's wife at the time. It was shown at a limited number of screens in the US. Although most critics' awards paid attention to co-stars Helen Mirren and Christopher Plummer, the Satellite Awards nominated McAvoy for Best Supporting Actor. In 2009, McAvoy voiced Angelina's father, Maurice Mouseling, in the television series, Angelina Ballerina: The Next Steps. He also appeared onstage in 2009 at Apollo Theatre's Three Days of Rain.

=== 2010s ===
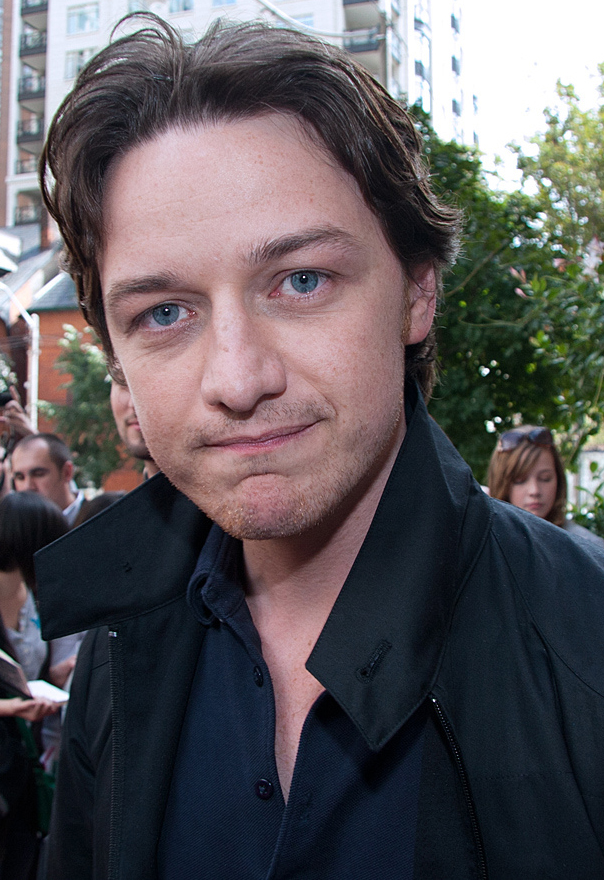
McAvoy at the 2010 Toronto International Film Festival

He voiced the male titular character in the film Gnomeo & Juliet (2011), an animated movie based on William Shakespeare's play Romeo and Juliet. In Robert Redford's historical American drama The Conspirator, McAvoy played the role of an idealistic war hero who reluctantly defends co-conspirator Mary Surratt (Robin Wright) charged in the Abraham Lincoln assassination. It premiered at the 2010 Toronto International Film Festival. While this movie garnered mixed reception, critics lauded the actor for his work. In Owen Gleiberman's assessment of The Conspirator, he found it "stiff-jointed" and tedious, but regarded McAvoy as "an avid presence".

In mid-2010, McAvoy was cast as telepathic superhero Professor X, leader and founder of the X-Men, in X-Men: First Class. He joined an ensemble that included Michael Fassbender, Jennifer Lawrence and Nicholas Hoult. Based on the Marvel Comics and a prequel to the film series, it focuses on the relationship between Professor X and Magneto and the origin of their groups. McAvoy did not read comics as a child, but was a fan of the X-Men animated cartoon series. Released to the UK on 1 June, First Class topped its box office with ticket sales of around £5 million in its opening weekend. First Class was reviewed favourably and McAvoy's performance was widely praised. In 2011, he began filming the role of Max Lewinsky in the British thriller Welcome to the Punch. That same year, McAvoy voiced the title character in the animated holiday film Arthur Christmas. He also played the lead role in the Danny Boyle film Trance.

In 2012, McAvoy was cast as Bruce Robertson in Filth, an adaptation of the Irvine Welsh novel of the same name. The film's ensemble cast includes McAvoy's former classmate Shauna Macdonald as his wife, as well as Jamie Bell, Jim Broadbent, Eddie Marsan and Imogen Poots. For his role, McAvoy won Best Actor at the British Independent Film Awards in December 2013. It was also announced that he would co-star with Jessica Chastain in a double-feature film project, The Disappearance of Eleanor Rigby. He performed the male lead in radio play adaptation of Neverwhere written by Neil Gaiman. In October 2016, McAvoy played the character Richard in the BBC Radio 4 production of Neil Gaiman's short story 'How The Marquis Got His Coat Back'.

McAvoy starred in Shakespeare's Macbeth on London's West End in early 2013. Macbeth was the first performance at the Trafalgar Transformed, running from 9 February until 27 April. The production was directed by Jamie Lloyd who also directed McAvoy in his last stint on the stage in 2009's Three Days of Rain. In 2015, McAvoy won the Best Actor award at London's Evening Standard Theater Awards for his portrayal of Jack Gurney in The Ruling Class, a revival of the Peter Barnes play directed by Jamie Lloyd. It ran at Trafalgar Studios from 16 January to 11 April 2015.

McAvoy reprised his role as Professor X in X-Men: Days of Future Past (2014), which grossed $747.9 million worldwide, making it the sixth highest-grossing film of the year 2014 and the second highest-grossing film in the X-Men franchise and in 2016's X-Men: Apocalypse. In 2016, he starred in the M. Night Shyamalan thriller Split as Kevin Wendell Crumb, a dissociative identity disorder sufferer with dangerous capabilities. In 2018, McAvoy voiced Hazel in the BBC miniseries Watership Down. In 2019, he reprised his role as Crumb in Glass and then returned as Professor X in the film Dark Phoenix. McAvoy played the adult Bill Denbrough in the horror film It Chapter Two, the sequel to It (2017), which premiered on 6 September 2019 and grossed $473 million at the box office. Also in 2019, McAvoy starred as Lord Asriel in the television adaptation of His Dark Materials.

=== 2020s ===
McAvoy voiced Dream in Audible's audio drama adaptation of The Sandman by Neil Gaiman in July 2020. McAvoy starred in the Jamie Lloyd Company production of Cyrano de Bergerac which opened in the West End's Playhouse Theatre in December 2019, for which he won a What's On Stage award for Best Performer in a Male-Identifying Role. He continued his performance in a limited run at the Harvey Theater at Brooklyn Academy of Music (BAM), opening the show stateside on 5 April 2022 and running until 22 May 2022. He began principal photography on his directorial debut, California Schemin', in Scotland in November 2024.

== Personal life ==
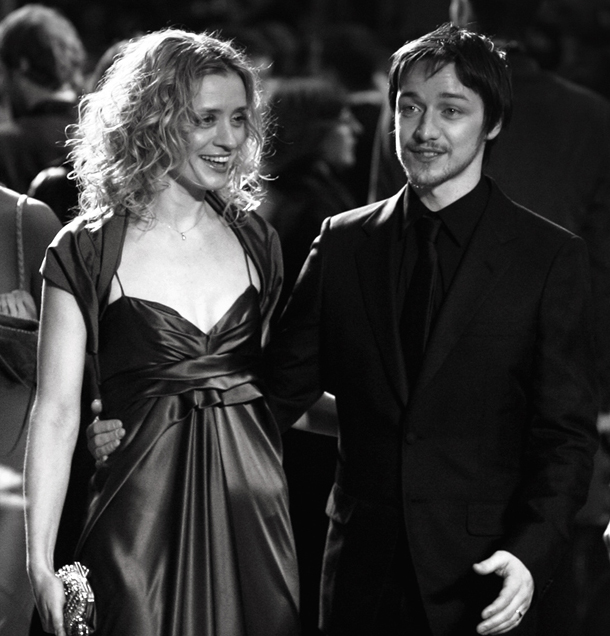
McAvoy and Anne-Marie Duff (2007)

While working on Shameless, McAvoy began dating co-star Anne-Marie Duff, who played his character's love interest. They married on 11 November 2006, and their son was born in 2010. McAvoy and Duff announced their decision to divorce in May 2016, and to minimise disruption to their son's life, they initially shared a home in north London when not working elsewhere. McAvoy later began a relationship with Lisa Liberati, whom he had met on the set of Split (2016), where she worked as a personal assistant to director M. Night Shyamalan. In early 2022, he confirmed they had privately married after years of speculation. The couple have a son born in 2022 and live in Crouch End.

After McAvoy won the "Rising Star" award from the BAFTAs, his estranged father spoke to the Sunday Mirror, stating that he would love to get in touch with his son but did not know how to contact him. Although he did not read the piece, McAvoy heard about it and was unmoved.

For Split (2016) and Glass (2019), McAvoy transformed his physique by gaining significant muscle mass (around 16-20 lbs) in months, to embody "The Beast". McAvoy stands at a height of 5 ft 7 in.

McAvoy considers himself a spiritual person who no longer practises Catholicism.

He enjoys fantasy themes, which he said started from age 11 with reading The Lord of the Rings. He had once been a video game addict, playing role-playing games such as The Legend of Zelda, Secret of Mana, and The Elder Scrolls IV: Oblivion, which he quit after it began affecting his life. McAvoy recalled burning his disc of Oblivion with a kitchen stove to get rid of his addiction to the game. McAvoy is a fan of Scottish Premiership club Celtic F.C., stating that his dream acting role would be Celtic player Jimmy Johnstone.

Speaking to Sky News in 2011, McAvoy said he believed that British filmmakers belittlingly attempt to dumb down their productions to please American audiences. He had previously called 3D films a "waste of money", accusing film studios of using the effect to get more money out of cinema audiences.

In September 2025, McAvoy was punched by a man at a bar in Toronto, Ontario. The man drank too much and was getting escorted out of the bar. McAvoy was in the city for the Toronto International Film Festival premiere of his film California Schemin', at the time. He stayed at the bar after the incident.

== Philanthropy ==
In 2011, McAvoy abseiled from the world's tallest hospital building to help raise money for Ugandan children's charity Retrak, which assists children on the streets. After this, he continued to support Retrak. He is a supporter of the British Red Cross with whom he travelled to Uganda to raise awareness of the projects there. He had become involved with the charity after shooting The Last King of Scotland there for several months and was shocked by what he saw. In February 2007, he visited northern Uganda and spent four days seeing projects supported by the British Red Cross.

In 2015, McAvoy pledged £125,000 to a 10-year scholarship programme at his former drama school, the Royal Conservatoire of Scotland. In March 2020, McAvoy donated £275,000 to a crowdfunding campaign to help the NHS mitigate the COVID-19 pandemic in the United Kingdom.

In 2021, McAvoy appeared as a contestant on an episode of Celebrity Bake Off to benefit Stand Up to Cancer. Competing against Anne-Marie, David Baddiel and Kelly Holmes, McAvoy emerged as the winner thanks to his previous experience as a trainee confectioner.

== Awards and nominations ==
Organisation	Year (Note: Year in which awards ceremony was held.)	Category	Work(s)	Result	Ref.
Alliance of Women Film Journalists	2007	Best Seduction (with Keira Knightley)	Atonement	Won	
British Academy Film Awards	2006	Rising Star Award	—N/a	Won	
British Academy Film Awards	2007	Best Actor in a Supporting Role	The Last King of Scotland	Nominated	
British Academy Film Awards	2008	Best Actor in a Leading Role	Atonement	Nominated	
British Academy Scotland Awards	2007	Best Actor in Film	The Last King of Scotland	Won	
British Academy Scotland Awards	2014	Best Actor in Film	Filth	Won	
British Academy Scotland Awards	2021	Best Actor in Television	Together	Won	
British Academy Scotland Awards	2025	Best Actor (Film/Television)	Speak No Evil	Nominated	
British Independent Film Awards	2006	Best Actor	The Last King of Scotland	Nominated	
British Independent Film Awards	2013	Best Actor	Filth	Won	
Cannes Film Festival	2007	Male Revelation	—N/a	Won	
Columbus Film Critics Association	2018	Best Actor	Split	Nominated	
Dublin Film Critics' Circle	2007	Best Actor	Atonement	Nominated	
Dublin Film Critics' Circle	2017	Best Actor	Split	Nominated	
Empire Awards	2006	Best Newcomer	The Chronicles of Narnia: The Lion, the Witch and the Wardrobe	Nominated	
Empire Awards	2008	Best Actor	Atonement	Won	
Empire Awards	2014	Best Actor	Filth	Won	
European Film Awards	2007	European Actor	The Last King of Scotland	Nominated	
European Film Awards	2008	European Actor	Atonement	Nominated	
Evening Standard British Film Awards	2008	Best Actor	Atonement, Becoming Jane	Nominated	
Fright Meter Awards	2017	Best Actor	Split	Won	
Golden Globes	2008	Best Actor – Motion Picture Drama	Atonement	Nominated	
Hawaii Film Critics Society	2018	Best Actor	Split	Won	
IFTA Film & Drama Awards	2008	Best International Actor	Atonement	Nominated	
IGN Awards	2011	Best Ensemble Cast	X-Men: First Class	Nominated	
Laurence Olivier Awards	2010	Best Actor	Three Days of Rain	Nominated	
Laurence Olivier Awards	2013	Best Actor	Macbeth	Nominated	
Laurence Olivier Awards	2015	Best Actor	The Ruling Class	Nominated	
Laurence Olivier Awards	2020	Best Actor	Cyrano de Bergerac	Nominated	
London Film Critics' Circle	2005	British Actor of the Year	Inside I'm Dancing	Nominated	
London Film Critics' Circle	2006	British Supporting Actor of the Year	The Chronicles of Narnia: The Lion, the Witch and the Wardrobe	Nominated	
London Film Critics' Circle	2007	British Actor of the Year	The Last King of Scotland	Nominated	
London Film Critics' Circle	2008	British Actor of the Year	Atonement	Won	
London Film Critics' Circle	2014	British Actor of the Year	Filth, Trance, Welcome to the Punch	Won	
MTV Movie & TV Awards	2009	Best Kiss (with Angelina Jolie)	Wanted	Nominated	
MTV Movie & TV Awards	2017	Best Actor in a Movie	Split	Nominated	
National Comedy Awards	2004	Best Comedy Newcomer	Shameless	Nominated	
National Film Awards UK	2019	Best Performance in an Animation Film	Sherlock Gnomes	Nominated	
National Movie Awards	2008	Best Performance – Male	Wanted	Nominated	
Nickelodeon Kids' Choice Awards	2017	#Squad	X-Men: Apocalypse	Nominated	
North Texas Film Critics Association	2017	Best Actor	Split	Nominated	
People's Choice Awards	2012	Favorite Movie Superhero	X-Men: First Class	Nominated	
Phoenix Film Critics Society	2017	Best Actor	Split	Nominated	
San Diego Film Critics Society	2017	Best Male Actor	Split	Won	
Santa Barbara International Film Festival	2008	Virtuoso Award	Atonement	Won	
Scream Awards	2011	Best Fantasy Actor	X-Men: First Class	Nominated	
Scream Awards	2011	Best Superhero	X-Men: First Class	Nominated	
Satellite Awards	2009	Best Actor in a Supporting Role	The Last Station	Nominated	
Seattle Film Critics Society	2017	Best Villain	Split	Won	
Standard Theatre Awards	2015	Best Actor	The Ruling Class	Won	
Standard Theatre Awards	2022	Best Actor	Cyrano de Bergerac	Won	
Teen Choice Awards	2017	Choice Movie Villain	Split	Nominated	
Teen Choice Awards	2019	Choice Movie Actor – Fantasy	Dark Phoenix	Nominated	
Variety Club of Great Britain Awards	2008	Variety Club Film Award	—N/a (Note: Award honoured all of a performer's work for past year; no specific role was credited.)	Won	
Women Film Critics Circle	2011	Best Screen Couple (with Emily Blunt)	Gnomeo & Juliet	Nominated	
(Source: IMDb)					
