= The Bletchley Circle: San Francisco =

Television series

- Genre: Crime drama; Mystery
- Created by: Guy Burt
- Directed by: Gary Harvey; Michael Rohl; Alexandra La Roche; David Frazee
- Starring: Julie Graham; Rachael Stirling; Crystal Balint; Chanelle Peloso; Ben Cotton; Jennifer Spence; Peter Benson; Colin Lawrence; Agape Mngomezulu
- Composer: James Jandrisch
- Countries of origin: Canada; United Kingdom
- Original language: English
- No. of series: 1
- No. of episodes: 8

Production
- Executive producers: Michael MacLennan; Brian Hamilton; Jake Lushington; Soumya Sriraman; Reemah Sakaan; Roderick Seligman; Paulo De Oliveira; Michael Chechik; Gabriela Schonbach
- Producer: Gigi Boyd
- Cinematography: Kamal Derkaoui
- Editors: Gordon Rempel; Nicole Ratcliffe
- Running time: 45 minutes
- Production companies: Omnifilm Entertainment; World Productions

Original release
- Network: ITV (United Kingdom); BritBox (United States); Citytv (Canada)
- Release: 25 July – 12 September 2018

Related
- The Bletchley Circle

The Bletchley Circle: San Francisco is a British-Canadian television drama series that premiered in the United Kingdom on ITV on 25 July 2018, in the United States on BritBox on 26 July 2018, and in Canada on Citytv on 14 September 2018.

A spin-off of the miniseries The Bletchley Circle, the new series follows Millie (Rachael Stirling) and Jean (Julie Graham) as they travel to San Francisco and continue to use their code-breaking skills to solve murders.

The Bletchley Circle: San Francisco is produced by Omnifilm Entertainment and World Productions for BritBox, with Kew Media as the international distributor. Filming began in March 2018 and takes place principally in Vancouver, British Columbia.

Following a successful debut season, Rachael Stirling and Julie Graham confirmed during an interview with Total TV Guide in April 2019 that a second series had been commissioned. The complete first series was released on DVD in Region 2 by Acorn Media on 20 May 2019.

== Cast and characters ==
=== Main ===
- Julie Graham as Jean McBrian
- Rachael Stirling as Camilla 'Millie' Harcourt
- Crystal Balint as Iris Bearden
- Chanelle Peloso as Hailey Yarner

=== Recurring ===
- Ben Cotton as Detective Bill Bryce
- Jennifer Spence as Olivia Mori
- Peter Benson as Archie Hunter
- Colin Lawrence as Marcus Bearden
- Agape Mngomezulu as Dennis Bearden
- Aria Birch as Cadence Bearden
- Luke Camilleri as Edward Harcourt

== Episodes ==
=== Series 1 (2018) ===
No.	Title	Directed by	Written by	Original release date	U.K. viewers (millions)
1	"Presidio"	Gary Harvey	Daegan Fryklind	25 July 2018	4.28
(Part 1/2). 1942, London, England. Code-breaker Claire Hopkins, on the eve of being transferred to Bristol after purposely disposing of an American communication, is found murdered with her tongue cut out and a mysterious symbol drawn on her hand. Fast forward fourteen years, and former colleagues Millie and Jean learn of the murders of two women in San Francisco in identical circumstances. Jean and Millie travel to San Francisco to try to make contact with a former American codebreaker, 'Major Sixth', whom Jean had been in regular communication with during the war. Jean learns that 'Major Sixth' is in fact Iris Bearden, wife of honoured US Armed Forces sergeant Marcus Bearden. Iris introduces Jean and Millie to Hailey Yarner, one of the youngest codebreakers at the time of the Americans joining the war. As the four women meet to try and work out the killer's pattern, a third victim is discovered and Iris begins to fear for her son, Dennis, a civil rights activist, who is part of a group opposing property developers bull-dozing their district, Fillmore — which just happens to be the killer's next target.
2	"Wake"	Gary Harvey	Michael MacLennan	1 August 2018	3.58
(Part 2/2). With San Francisco in the grip of a serial killer, the four allies work together to expose a sinister conspiracy at the highest levels - and in the process, forge a powerful bond.
3	"Charlotte’s Web"	Michael Rohl	Damon Vignale	8 August 2018	3.19
(Part 1/2). Newly-weds driving on a country road find a body, apparently the victim of a hit and run. She was the unhappy wife living the country club life. Iris, Millie, Jean and Hailey investigate the discovery of an apparent code book, and discover a nest of lies and deceit.
4	"Madhouse"	Michael Rohl	Rachel Langer	15 August 2018	3.21
(Part 2/2). The apparent code book isn't what it seems to be, but it still provides clues. Detective Bryce makes an arrest and Millie has a date.
5	"Not Cricket"	Alexandra La Roche	Michael MacLennan	22 August 2018; 26 April 2019 (UK)	N/A
(Part 1/2). When a bloodied and bruised stranger collapses on Jean and Millie's doorstep, they find themselves drawn into a complex maze of problems involving a gang of violent drug dealers and a secret group of 'homophile' men communicating through the newspaper's small ads. But as they try to figure out how the two organisations could be connected, Millie's cousin Edward becomes the next victim. Millie asks Detective Bryce to meet with Edward and hear his story, and Edward reveals his homosexuality to Bryce. After he's released from the hospital, Edward is accused of being a Communist and arrested; leading Jean and Millie to believe that Bryce had betrayed their trust.
6	"Iron in War"	Alexandra La Roche	Daegan Fryklind	29 August 2018; 3 May 2019 (UK)	N/A
(Part 2/2). Unsure of who they can really trust, Jean and Millie are shocked to discover they are facing deportation as a result of their association with Edward. They suspect that Detective Bryce was instrumental in ensuring their fate. Hailey and Iris find out the name of the party placing the cryptic ads, and Hailey convinces her former boss to place an ad in the newspaper in an attempt to flush out the dealers. As Jean and Millie stake out the drug dealers' secret hideout, they are shocked to witness Detective Bryce liaising with their leader. The group finds out that Edward used to be a member of the Mattachine Society, and Millie discerns that he and the stranger who was attacked had been more than just friends. The refusal by the leader of the Mattachine Society to help Edward angers Hailey and she reveals her homosexuality to Iris. The circle convinces Rusty to help them, and the group and the drug dealers finally meet in a showdown at the Big Bop club.
7	"Fog of War"	David Frazee	Damon Vignale	5 September 2018; 10 May 2019 (UK)	N/A
(Part 1/2). Iris and Hayley's attendance at a soirée involving a world-renowned cellist ends in unexpected disaster when a Russian diplomat collapses and dies right in front of Iris' eyes. Meanwhile, Jean is pleased to discover that an old acquaintance from England, Nigel Beamish, is in San Francisco working for the British consulate. But after meeting Nigel for a romantic afternoon picnic, Jean discovers she has picked up the attention of some unwanted admirers.
8	"In for a Pound"	David Frazee	Michael MacLennan & Laura Good	12 September 2018; 17 May 2019 (UK)	N/A
(Part 2/2). Iris, Hailey and Millie ask Olivia for help cracking the cipher which could potentially reveal where the Russians are holding Jean. Hailey realizes she has been betrayed and watches on in horror as her cipher machine disappears into the arms of the mysterious Ilyia. Iris is forced to choose between her head and her heart when the girls track the Russians to a private airfield and find that Deborah has secretly been in league with them all along.

== Reception ==
On review aggregator website Rotten Tomatoes the series has a 31% approval rating. The critical consensus states: "The Bletchley Circle does not fare well when it relocates to San Francisco, unable to convincingly capture its period setting and hobbled by an outlandish murder mystery that fails to enthrall."

In the review for The Times, Carol Midgley said the series seemed "to have been conceived primarily to feed viewer appetite for lush 1950s visuals, with plot and dialogue coming second." In the Los Angeles Times, however, Lorraine Ali wrote: "Though this round of sleuthing isn't as full of surprises as the series set in the UK, it does effectively play with a different set of era-specific hurdles unique to the US. The Bletchley Circle: San Francisco isn't as rich and meaningful as its predecessor, but it's evocative and entertaining, with a little murder thrown in for good measure."
