= Shameik Moore =

American actor and musician (born 1995)

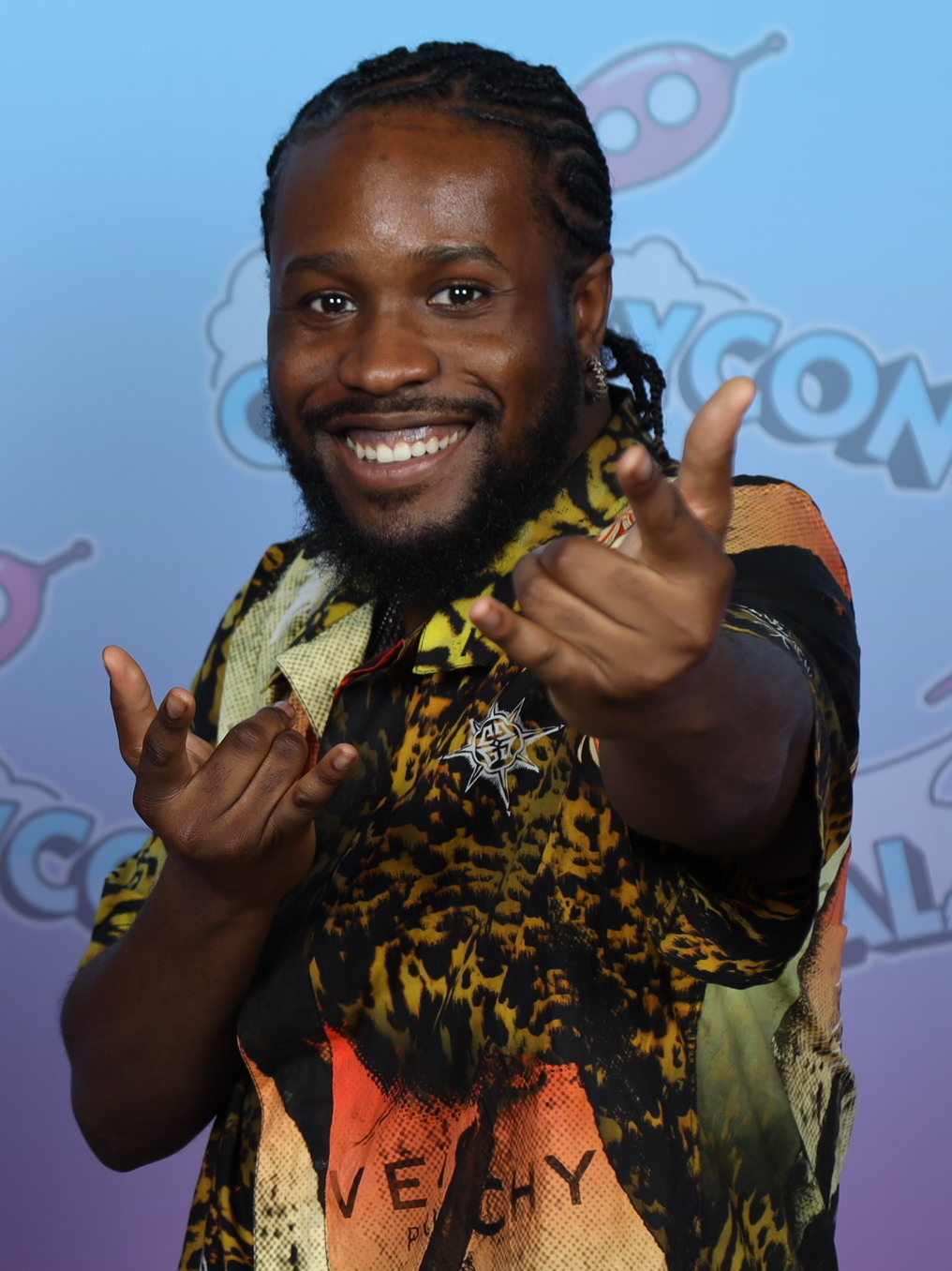
- Moore at GalaxyCon Raleigh in 2023
- Born: Shameik Alti Moore; May 4, 1995 (age 31); Atlanta, Georgia, U.S.
- Other name: King SAM
- Occupations: Actor; singer; rapper
- Years active: 2011–present
- Musical career
- Genres: Hip hop; R&B; pop; reggae
- Instrument: Vocals
- Label: Altimont
- Website: shameikmoore.com

Shameik Alti Moore (born May 4, 1995) is an American actor and musician. He made his lead acting debut in Dope (2015), and is best known for voicing Miles Morales / Spider-Man in the animated Spider-Verse film series and for portraying Wu-Tang Clan member Raekwon in the Hulu series Wu-Tang: An American Saga.

== Early life ==
Moore was born in Atlanta, Georgia. He attended Druid Hills High School. His family is originally from Jamaica.

== Career ==
Moore started off with bit roles in shows and films such as Tyler Perry's House of Payne, Reed Between the Lines, and Joyful Noise. In 2013, he had his first main television role on the sketch-comedy series Incredible Crew, which aired on Cartoon Network before being canceled after one season. He then gained recognition with his portrayal of Malcolm in the 2015 film Dope, which premiered at the 2015 Sundance Film Festival. IndieWire included Moore on its list of "The 12 Major Breakouts of the 2015 Sundance Film Festival" for his performance in the movie. He is also one of the five male leads in the Netflix series The Get Down, which premiered in 2016 and was canceled in 2017 after one season.

Moore voiced Miles Morales in the animated film Spider-Man: Into the Spider-Verse from Sony Pictures Animation, which was released in December 2018, and reprised the role in 2023's Spider-Man: Across the Spider-Verse and will reprise the role in Spider-Man: Beyond the Spider-Verse. From 2019 to 2023, he played Raekwon of the Wu-Tang Clan in Hulu's Wu-Tang: An American Saga.

== Personal life ==
In December 2024, Moore posted a year-old video of himself and actress Laura Harrier together. Harrier publicly denounced this because she was engaged and revealed that Moore had not deleted the video after she had asked him to do so in private.

== Filmography ==
Key
†	Denotes works that have not yet been released

=== Film ===
Year	Title	Role	Notes
2012	Joyful Noise	Our Lady of Perpetual Tears Choir Master	
2015	Dope	Malcolm Adekanbi	Nominated — Critics' Choice Movie Award for Best Young Performer
2018	Pretenders	Phil	
2018	Spider-Man: Into the Spider-Verse	Miles Morales / Spider-Man	Voice
2019	Let It Snow	Stuart Bale	
2020	Cut Throat City	Blink	
2022	Samaritan	Devin Holloway	
2023	Spider-Man: Across the Spider-Verse	Miles Morales / Spider-Man	Voice
2023	The Spider Within: A Spider-Verse Story	Miles Morales / Spider-Man	Voice; short film
2024	The Gutter	Walt	
2025	One Spoon of Chocolate	Unique	
2027	Spider-Man: Beyond the Spider-Verse †	Miles Morales / Spider-Man	Voice; In production

=== Television ===
Year	Title	Role	Notes
2011	House of Payne	Dante	Episode: "Playing with Fire"
2011	Reed Between the Lines	Blake	Episode: "Let's Talk About Hair"
2011	An Elf's Story: The Elf on the Shelf	Zart	
2012–2013	Incredible Crew	Various characters	Main cast
2013	The Watsons Go to Birmingham	James Jr.	TV movie
2016–2017	The Get Down	Shaolin Fantastic	Main cast
2019–2023	Wu-Tang: An American Saga	Sha/Raekwon	Main cast
2025–2026	Power Book III: Raising Kanan	Branford "Breeze" Frady	

== Discography ==
=== Studio albums ===
Title	Album details
30058	Released: July 15, 2015; Label: We Music Group; Format: Digital download, streaming

=== Mixtapes ===
Title	Album details
I Am The Beat	Released: January 30, 2012; Label: None; Format: Digital download, streaming

=== Singles ===
Title	Year	Album
"Back It Up"	2015	Non-album singles
"Cautious"	2016	Non-album singles
"Jiggle It"	2016	Non-album singles
"Break the Locks" (with The Get Down Brothers)	2017	Non-album singles
"Ride the Beat"	2017	Non-album singles
"Bounce"	2018	Non-album singles
"Mhmm"	2020	Non-album singles
"Clean Slate"	2024	Non-album singles
