= The Bletchley Circle =

British TV mystery drama series by Guy Burt (2012-2014)

- Written by: Guy Burt
- Directed by: Andy De Emmony; Jamie Payne; Sarah Harding
- Starring: Anna Maxwell Martin; Rachael Stirling; Sophie Rundle; Julie Graham; Hattie Morahan
- Composer: Nick Green
- Country of origin: United Kingdom
- Original language: English
- No. of series: 2
- No. of episodes: 7 (list of episodes)

Production
- Executive producer: Simon Heath
- Producer: Jake Lushington
- Cinematography: John Pardue
- Running time: 45 minutes
- Production company: World Productions

Original release
- Network: ITV
- Release: 6 September 2012 – 27 January 2014

Related
- The Bletchley Circle: San Francisco

The Bletchley Circle is a television mystery drama series, set in 1952–53, about four women who had worked as codebreakers at Bletchley Park, the principal centre of British code-breaking during the Second World War. Dissatisfied with post-war official failure to investigate complex crimes properly, the women join together to investigate for themselves and to bring their findings to the relevant authorities.

The first series of the miniseries, produced for ITV, was originally shown in the UK in 2012 and premiered in the U.S. in April 2013, on PBS. A second series was broadcast on ITV in January 2014 and on PBS in April 2014. Both series were later aired by Australia's ABC TV. The series was distributed worldwide by Kew Media.

The programme was not renewed for a third series. However, in 2018, a spinoff series titled The Bletchley Circle: San Francisco was released by ITV and BritBox.

== Plot ==
Susan Gray, Millie, Lucy, and Jean worked together at Bletchley Park to decipher German military codes for the British military, during World War II. After a brief introduction of the four women at Bletchley during the war, the series begins in 1952, seven years after the war's end, when Susan, Millie, Lucy, and Jean have returned to their ordinary lives. As the story begins, Susan learns about a series of murders that have occurred in the London area and begins to recognise patterns connecting the killings. This inspires her to return to her codebreaking past, and she reaches out first to Millie, and then to Lucy and Jean, after unsuccessfully trying to convince the police to follow up her theory about the crimes.

As they all signed orders of secrecy about their work during the war, the two married women (Susan and Lucy), disguise their activities from their husbands as a book club. Failing to secure police involvement, they move from codebreaking and investigation into the realm of field work, with dangerous consequences on several occasions. Scenes of domestic tranquility are contrasted with scenes of the killer stalking and torturing his victims. While initially skeptical about becoming involved, Millie, Jean, and Lucy are convinced to help Susan once they realise the lives of many women are on the line.

The series contrasts the conventional but very different lives of the four women and the sense of usefulness they felt while codebreaking during the war. In the Series 1 finale, the women are forced to confront the man they suspect to be the killer.

== Cast and characters ==
- Anna Maxwell Martin as Susan Gray, a housewife and the mother of two children. She is troubled by the mundanity of her current life.
- Rachael Stirling as Camilla 'Millie' Harcourt, an independent-minded single woman. She and Susan lost touch when Susan decided to pursue a more conventional lifestyle. Her room becomes the meeting point for the group.
- Sophie Rundle as Lucy, the youngest member of the circle. She is married to an indolent man named Harry, who beats her when she returns from an investigation. Lucy has an eidetic memory and specialises in recalling and processing data.
- Julie Graham as Jean McBrian, the oldest woman in the circle, she was a supervisor of the younger women at Bletchley. A librarian after the war, she has many connections and access to information.
- Mark Dexter as Timothy Gray, war veteran and the husband of Susan Gray. He is unaware of Susan's service as a codebreaker during the war.
- Ed Birch as Harry, Lucy's controlling husband, who beat her when he suspected her of infidelity after she was attacked.
- Michael Gould as Deputy Commissioner Wainwright. Also a war veteran, Commissioner Wainwright served with Timothy Gray during the war and now heads the local Metropolitan Police division.
- Simon Sherlock as DCI Compton
- Simon Williams as Cavendish. Cavendish was a high-ranking member of the Special Operations Executive who helps Susan by providing information from Malcolm Crowley's personnel file.
- Steven Robertson as Malcolm Crowley, a disturbed veteran who worked with Cavendish on psychological warfare techniques during the war.
- Hattie Morahan as Alice Merren (series 2), a former Bletchley Park colleague, awaiting trial for killing John Richards, her old flame and a Bletchley scientist. Jean, believing Alice is covering for someone, begins to reunite the circle to help establish her innocence.
- Faye Marsay as Lizzie Lancaster (series 2)
- Nick Blood as Ben Gladstone (series 2), Lucy's colleague and love interest

== Episode list ==
=== Series 1 (2012) ===
No. in season	Title	Directed by	Written by	Original release date	UK viewing figures (millions) Sourced by BARB; includes ITV1 HD and ITV1 +1
1	"Cracking a Killer's Code, Part 1"	Andy De Emmony	Guy Burt	6 September 2012	5.81
Seven years after WWII, four women who worked as codebreakers at Bletchley Park have taken up mundane civilian lives. Susan, now a housewife, has collated data about a series of murders. She tells the police she knows where another body is, but they are unable to locate it and dismiss her. Susan turns to her friends Millie, Lucy, and Jean, former codebreaking colleagues at Bletchley Park. They work out where the next victim will be taken, find the body, then decide only they can find the killer.
2	"Cracking a Killer's Code, Part 2"	Andy De Emmony	Guy Burt	13 September 2012	5.73
The women collate information about the schedules of trains the victims had been on and use the results to identify suspects. Susan gives the police names of three potential perpetrators. Jean and Lucy discover seven similar murders, elsewhere, that the police in those jurisdictions consider solved, but the women believe innocent men have been framed and convicted. The police arrest a man whose name was given to them by Susan, even after she tells them she believes he was framed. The women devise a plan to trap the actual killer using Lucy as bait, but it backfires when she goes with the wrong man. Another suspect emerges from the Special Operations Executive, headed by Cavendish. Susan comes face to face with the killer at a closed mental hospital.
3	"Cracking a Killer's Code, Part 3"	Andy De Emmony	Guy Burt	20 September 2012	5.37
Susan returns with the police, but the killer has gone. She finds a coded message in her home with Cavendish's address, and going there finds him dead. A postcard on Cavendish's desk provides a clue; Susan, following the thread, walks alone into a trap set for her by the killer.

=== Series 2 (2014) ===
This series is made up of two 2-part stories totalling four episodes.

No. in season	Title	Directed by	Written by	Original release date	UK viewing figures (millions) Sourced by BARB; includes ITV1 HD and ITV1 +1
1	"Blood on Their Hands, Part 1"	Jamie Payne	Guy Burt	6 January 2014	5.46
Former Bletchley Park colleague Alice Merren (Hattie Morahan) is awaiting trial for the murder of a distinguished scientist (Paul McGann). Despite the overwhelming evidence of Alice's guilt, Jean is determined to prove Alice is innocent and reassembles the women to prove it. Their investigation reveals the misguided reason Alice is willing to hang for a crime she did not commit.
2	"Blood on Their Hands, Part 2"	Jamie Payne	Guy Burt	13 January 2014	4.98
The circle's investigation discovers three men with chemical burns in a truck crash on Salisbury plain, near the chemical warfare establishment at Porton Down. They suspect a high level cover-up involving the death of the scientist and the framing of Alice Merren, whereupon they themselves come under surveillance.
3	"Uncustomed Goods, Part 1"	Sarah Harding	Guy Burt	20 January 2014	4.63
Due to her notoriety, Alice cannot get a job, so Millie offers help. Millie is involved in the post-war black market. When she disappears, the women must search for her, because the police will not take them seriously. Millie is being held hostage by Soho Maltese gangsters until her shady business partner Jasper (Rob Jarvis) pays money he owes them. While in captivity, Millie discovers the gangsters are importing Eastern European girls to be sold into prostitution.
4	"Uncustomed Goods, Part 2"	Sarah Harding	Guy Burt	27 January 2014	4.66
Jasper is murdered, and corruption in the vice squad leads to inaction by the police. The women plot to catch the gang red-handed by buying contraband goods, a ruse that enables Lucy to memorise the gang's encrypted ledger. The women return to Bletchley Park, now a college where Alice's daughter is studying, to take a Typex machine from the derelict huts, but they instead find an old Enigma machine. However, they still have to find a way to inform Customs and Excise about the contraband, which includes the trafficked girls.

== Allusions to real events ==
The premise of the series is based on the women who worked at Bletchley Park during World War II, who for the most part did not continue in intelligence work, and under the rules of the Official Secrets Act 1939 in the UK never shared the nature of their contributions to crucial aspects of the Allies' victory.

In the second series, one character refers to sarin gas as having been developed by the Germans during World War II, along with other such chemical weapons, then taken up by the former Allies. The UK did have an incident of a young man killed from experiments with the gas in 1953; in 2004, his inquest was reopened, and the cause of death was altered from death by misadventure to death by "application of a nerve agent in a non-therapeutic experiment".

== Reception ==
Upon its U.S. premiere—which occurred in prime time following U.S. episodes of Call the Midwife and Mr Selfridge—Variety called The Bletchley Circle "smart, addictive and situated in a fascinating historical moment". In a review of the first series, The New York Times said the series finds "a clever, entertaining way to pay tribute to women who in their time were often overlooked and underestimated, and nevertheless found ways to never be ordinary".

== See also ==
Russian remake "Сypher" (Шифр) about former female members of GRU (2019-2024).
