= Like Lambs =

Horror film

- Directed by: Ted Marcus
- Written by: Ted Marcus
- Produced by: John Kassab
- Cinematography: Parker Tolifson
- Production companies: The Ark Picture Company; Creative Initiative Make-Up & FX Studio
- Release date: 2016
- Running time: 83 minutes
- Country: United States
- Language: English

Like Lambs is an independent action and horror film written and directed by Ted Marcus. It was released in 2016 at the Atlanta Film Festival, and also presented at the Boston International Film Festival.

== Synopsis ==
During an economic collapse, boarding school students find corruption cases involving elite bankers. In revolt, they devise a plan to compel a bourgeois to release money or watch their children die on national television.

== Cast ==
- Liam Aiken ... Charlie Masters
- Ted Marcus ... Sebastian Dollarhyde
- Justin Chon ... Jasper Cho
- Connor Paolo ... Mick Springfield
- Lindsay Keys ... Rebecca Fitzpatrick
- Chanelle Peloso ... Dahlia Fitzpatrick
- Morgan Schuler ... Bat #2
- Liz Butler ... Witch with the Cauldron

== Production ==
The film was shot over the fall of 2013 in a gothic castle in New England. 35mm films were used that remained from the productions of 12 Years a Slave and The Wolf of Wall Street. To finish the production, about 33 thousand dollars were collected in the Kickstarter.
