= Zapped (2014 film) =

2014 American television film by Peter DeLuise

- Promotional poster
- Genre: Comedy, Fantasy, Teen
- Based on: Boys are Dogs by Leslie Margolis
- Screenplay by: Rachelle Skoretz; Matt Eddy; Billy Eddy
- Story by: Rachelle Skoretz
- Directed by: Peter DeLuise
- Starring: Zendaya; Chanelle Peloso; Spencer Boldman; Emilia McCarthy
- Theme music composer: James Jandrisch
- Countries of origin: United States; Canada
- Original language: English

Production
- Producer: Lisa Towers
- Cinematography: Jim Menard
- Editor: Richard Schwadel
- Running time: 102 minutes
- Production companies: Off-Leash Teleproductions, Inc.

Original release
- Network: Disney Channel
- Release: June 27, 2014

Zapped is a 2014 science fiction teen comedy film released as a Disney Channel Original Movie. It stars Zendaya, Chanelle Peloso, Emilia McCarthy and Spencer Boldman. Zendaya plays the lead role, Zoey Stevens.

== Plot ==
16-year-old Zoey Stevens is an average high schooler whose widowed mother just remarried. They move in with her new stepfather and three stepbrothers, Adam, Zach, and Ben. Adam is always in a rush due to being captain of the basketball team; Ben is always getting dirty; Zach has a habit of making disgusting food creations, and their father, Ted, is the basketball team coach.

After a disastrous first day at her new school, Zoey downloads an app with the original purpose of controlling the family dog, but after her phone falls into dog food and skates down solar panels, she finds out the app has changed from being able to control her dog to controlling the men in her life. She first finds it freaky, but then realizes how much of an advantage she has and decides to use it as a personal tool.

Zoey uses the app to make things right in her school not forgetting her dance team. Her dance rival, Taylor, becomes suspicious of her while she notices her using the app during dance training. Zoey realizes that using the app against people's advantage isn't going to change anything and decides to quit using the app.

While at the washroom, Taylor steals her phone without her noticing and uses it to make all the men on the basketball court respect and obey her commands. Zoey and her friend Rachel track her down and retrieve the phone from her. Zoey then breaks the phone to pieces, as she learns that she gets to spend more time with her family. After that, a dance competition is held and Zoey's team wins.

In a post-credits scene, two students who are in detention discover Zoey's phone and it zaps, hinting the app still works.

== Cast ==
- Zendaya as Zoey Stevens, the central character of the film.
- Chanelle Peloso as Rachel, Zoey's best friend.
- Spencer Boldman as Jackson, Zoey's love interest and former boyfriend of Taylor's.
- Emilia McCarthy as Taylor, Zoey's rival, school diva.
- Adam DiMarco as Adam Thompson, Zoey's oldest stepbrother who plays basketball.
- William Ainscough as Ben Thompson, Zoey's youngest stepbrother.
- Aleks Paunovic as Ted Thompson, Zoey's stepfather and Adam, Zach & Ben's widowed father.
- Lucia Walters as Jeannie Stevens, Zoey's widowed mother and Adam, Zach & Ben's stepmother.
- Jedidiah Goodacre as Tripp, Jackson's best friend.
- Louriza Tronco as Yuki, Taylor's best friend.
- Connor Cowie as Zach Thompson, Zoey's middle stepbrother.
- Samuel Patrick Chu as Charlie, Rachel's love interest.

== Production ==
Zapped is produced by Off-Leash Teleproductions, Inc., distributed by Muse Distribution International and MarVista Entertainment and is licensed by ABC Cable Networks and Family Channel.

== Broadcast ==
Zapped was released on demand and Watch Disney Channel on June 23, 2014. It made its debut on June 27, 2014 on Disney Channel in the United States, and Family Channel in Canada. Disney Channel (UK and Ireland) broadcast the film on July 18, 2014.

== Reception ==
The premiere garnered 5.7 million viewers, making it the most-watched broadcast on cable that night. In the United Kingdom, it received 320,000 viewers including timeshift.
