= Dusty Hughes (playwright) =

English playwright, director and television screenwriter

Dusty Hughes (born 16 September 1947) is an English playwright, director and television screenwriter. In the early 1970s he was Theatre Editor of Time Out and helped to establish that magazine's theatre coverage as an alternative voice. He then joined the Bush Theatre as artistic director and helped develop it as a venue for new writing and directed new plays by Snoo Wilson, Kurt Vonnegut, Howard Barker, Ron Hutchinson and Ken Campbell.

== Early life ==
Hughes was born in Boston, Lincolnshire, the son of Harold Hughes a schoolmaster and Peggy (née Holland) a marriage guidance counsellor and youth theatre producer. Hughes was educated at Queen Elizabeth Grammar School, Wakefield and Trinity Hall, Cambridge.

At Cambridge, he was a member of Footlights where he appeared in the revue “Supernatural Gas” (directed by Clive James) as Tsar Nicolas II and a seven foot high HP Sauce bottle. He is thinly disguised in James's autobiography May Week Was In June as Rusty Gates.

== Career ==
In 1980, his first play Commitments (which preceded the unrelated Roddy Doyle novel and subsequent film of the same name) won him the London Theatre Critics Most Promising Playwright Award. His subsequent plays have been seen at the National Theatre, the Royal Shakespeare Company in Stratford and London, the Royal Court, Hampstead Theatre, the Traverse Theatre, Edinburgh, the Bush, the Donmar and the West End, as well as in Europe and North America.

He has worked extensively in television. He was joint winner of the Writer's Guild Award for Best Drama Series for Between The Lines and created The Brief for ITV as well as adapting Joseph Conrad’s The Secret Agent for BBC1. He has also written for many other series including Silent Witness, Lewis and most recently, the BBC's swashbuckling series The Musketeers.

== Plays ==
- Grrr: Edinburgh, 1968
- In At The Death: Bush Theatre, London, 1978
- Commitments: Bush Theatre, London, 1980
- Heaven and Hell: Edinburgh, 1981
- Breach Of The Peace: Bush Theatre, London 1982
- Moliere; or, The Union Of Hypocrites: Stratford-on-Avon, 1982
- Bad Language: Hampstead Theatre, London, 1983
- Philistines: Stratford-on-Avon, 1985
- Futurists: Cottesloe Theatre, National Theatre, 1986, directed by Richard Eyre; ISBN 0-571-13778-4
- Jenkin's Ear: Royal Court Theatre, London. 1987; ISBN 0-571-14565-5
- Metropolis: Piccadilly Theatre, London, 1989 (a musical based on Fritz Lang's 1927 silent movie, Metropolis)
- A Slip of the Tongue: Steppenwolf Theatre, Chicago, 1992
- Helpless: Donmar Warehouse Theatre, London, 2000, directed by Robin Lefevre.

== Television ==
- Commitments (Play for Today, 1982)
- The Secret Agent (1992)
- Silent Witness (2003–2004)
- The Brief (2004–2005)
- Lewis (2008–2011)
- The Musketeers (2016)

== Bibliography ==
- Futurists and commitments, Faber and Faber, 1986, ISBN 978-0-571-13778-7
