= Mr. Tumnus =

Narnia books character

Tumnus
- Narnia character
- James McAvoy as Tumnus in the 2005 film The Chronicles of Narnia: The Lion, the Witch and the Wardrobe

In-universe information
- Race: Faun
- Nationality: Narnian

Mr. Tumnus is a faun in The Chronicles of Narnia books written by C. S. Lewis, primarily in The Lion, the Witch and the Wardrobe but also briefly in The Horse and His Boy and in The Last Battle. He is the first creature Lucy Pevensie meets in Narnia and becomes her first friend in the kingdom. Lewis wrote that the first Narnia story, The Lion, the Witch and the Wardrobe, all came to him from a single picture he had in his head of a faun carrying an umbrella and parcels through a snowy wood. Tumnus thus became the initial inspiration for the entire Narnia series.

== Description ==
Lewis describes Tumnus as having reddish skin, curly hair, brown eyes, a short pointed beard, horns on his forehead, cloven hooves, goat legs with glossy black hair, a "strange but pleasant little face", a long tail, and being "only a little taller than Lucy herself".

Tumnus first appears when Lucy arrives in Narnia at the lamp post. He invites her back to his cave for tea, during which, they talk about Narnia, including its glorious past which gave way to endless winter. Tumnus plays an evocative tune on his flute, but when Lucy says that she has to go, he bursts into tears. He confesses that he is in the pay of the White Witch (Jadis), who rules Narnia and has made it always winter but never Christmas. She had ordered him and the other Narnians to hand over any Sons of Adam or Daughters of Eve – humans – should they ever encounter any in Narnia. Tumnus, despite fearing that the Witch will find out and is likely to punish him severely if he disobeys her orders, quickly realises that he cannot bring himself to give up Lucy to the Witch, so he guides her back to the lamp-post to see that she returns safely to her own world.

When Lucy returns to Narnia a few days later, Tumnus is still safe: evidently the White Witch has not discovered his disobedience. However, Lucy's brother Edmund has also entered Narnia and mentions to the White Witch that his sister had visited Narnia before and met a faun – even though he does not name the faun as Tumnus.

When Lucy and her siblings subsequently come to Narnia some time afterwards, they find that Tumnus has been arrested by Maugrim, Chief of the White Witch's secret police, and is awaiting trial on a charge of high treason which involves harbouring spies and fraternizing with humans. Tumnus had spoken to Mr Beaver of his fears not long before his arrest and asked him to guide the four children if he found them in Narnia. The children meet Mr Beaver just after leaving Tumnus's ransacked cave.

Later in the story, when the winter has come to an end and Aslan is preparing an army to take on the White Witch, Lucy and Susan find Tumnus petrified as a statue in the Witch's castle, and he is restored by Aslan. He follows the other Narnians to the battle as the Witch is defeated and killed.

Years later, he is the one who tells the Kings and Queens that the White Stag has been spotted near his home. Their hunt for it leads to their disappearance from Narnia and the end of the Golden Age.

In The Horse and His Boy, Tumnus appears as a royal adviser to the four Pevensie monarchs (fourteen years later, according to Lewis's Narnian Timeline). He devises a plan for escaping from Calormen, thereby saving Queen Susan from being forcibly married to Prince Rabadash, and the other Narnians, including her brother Edmund, from certain death trying to defend her.

He and Lucy eventually meet again in Aslan's Country in The Last Battle.

== Portrayals ==
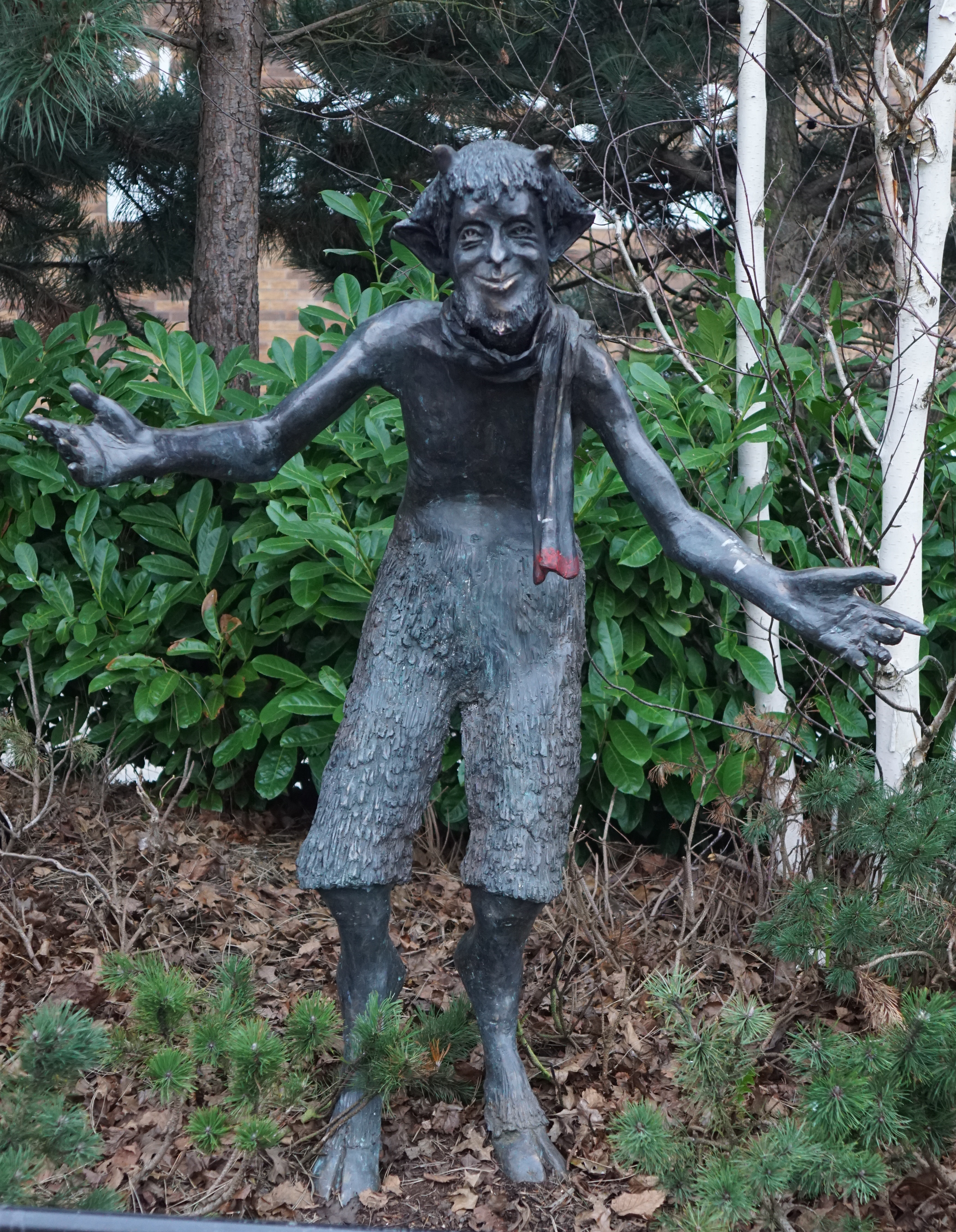
Mr Tumnus (by Maurice Harron (2016), C. S. Lewis Square, Belfast).

- He appeared in the 1967 TV serial and was portrayed by Angus Lennie.
- In the 1979 animated film, Mr. Tumnus is voiced by Leslie Phillips (UK version) and Victor Spinetti (US version).
- He originally appeared in the 1988 BBC miniseries of The Chronicles of Narnia played by actor Jeffrey Perry.
- Tumnus appears in the 2005 film The Lion, the Witch and the Wardrobe, Tumnus has light skin, blue eyes, brown legs, and a stubbly little tail. In this film, he is the character that crowns the four Pevensie children at Cair Paravel. He was portrayed by actor James McAvoy.
- He is voiced by Philip Sherlock in the Focus on the Family Radio Theatre adaptations, and by Norman Bird in the BBC Radio 4 adaptations.

== See also ==
- Pan (mythology)
- Puck (mythology)
- Satyr
- Vertumnus
