= The Near Room =

1995 film directed by David Hayman

- Directed by: David Hayman
- Screenplay by: Robert Murphy
- Starring: Adrian Dunbar; David O'Hara; David Hayman; James McAvoy; Andy Serkis; Julie Graham
- Edited by: Martin Sharpe
- Music by: James Grant; Paul McGeechan
- Production companies: British Screen Presentation; The Glasgow Film Fund; Inverclyde Productions
- Distributed by: Metrodome Distribution (1997, UK - theatrical)
- Release date: 20 August 1995 (U.K); (premiere) - Edinburgh International Film Festival
- Running time: 89 min
- Country: United Kingdom
- Language: English

The Near Room is a 1995 British film directed by and starring David Hayman. It premiered at the Edinburgh International Film Festival before its distribution in the United Kingdom in 1997. The film is set within the "Glasgow Noir" genre, blending elements of drama and thriller. The title refers to a metaphorical place where one's most nightmarish fears and dreadful imaginings reside. It also marked the film debut of James McAvoy

== Plot ==
Journalist Charlie Colquhoun spends his career in a rumble, with danger of a lawsuit by lawyer Harris Hill, Colquhoun's old schoolmate, while defending a client. Elise Gray, Coulquhoun's ex-wife, passes onto Charlie the job of finding a missing teenager, Tommy. In a fate of events, his life gets mangled with dodgy characters, in the underground world with murder, blackmail, child prostitution and rape.

== Cast ==
- Adrian Dunbar as Charlie Colquhoun
- David O'Hara as Harris Hill
- David Hayman as Dougie Patterson
- Julie Graham as Elise Gray
- Andy Serkis as Bunny
- James McAvoy as Kevin
- Robert Pugh as Eddie Harte
- Garry Sweeney as Young Harris Hill
- Allan Sharpe as Pa Savage
- Annie Louise Ross as Ma Savage
- Peter McDougall as Alastair Clegg
- James Ellis as Pat
- Emma Faulkner as Tommy Stirling

== Critical response ==
The response to this movie was mixed.

Derek Elley, Variety, says:

[...] Debut scripter Robert Murphy’s four-letter dialogue is square-jawed without tipping over into parody.

Main problem is getting an emotional hook on the characters, all of whom are either cold or thoroughly disagreeable, including the central protag. Though Dunbar holds the screen here better than in the recent (also noirish) "Innocent Lies", he’s still a fine character actor rather than a leading man.

Audience involvement isn’t helped by an unbalanced soundtrack in which much of the already hard-to-comprehend thick Scottish dialogue battles against music and effects. In as densely a plotted movie as this, you really need to be able to follow every word.

[...] Newcomer Faulkner is excellent as the bruised but tough Tommy.

Aside from the sound mix, tech credits on the pic are superior, given the paltry $1.2 million budget. Andy Harris’ inventive production design and Martin Sharpe’s editing are both on the money.
