= Helpless (play) =

Play by Dusty Hughes

Helpless is a play by Dusty Hughes that premiered at the Donmar Warehouse in London on 8 March 2000. It is set in England before, during, and after the 1997 general elections, which resulted in New Labour's landslide victory and in Tony Blair becoming prime minister.

== Outline of the plot ==
Will and Claire were politically active in the 1960s: They had their socialist and Marxist ideals and, a couple back then, rebelled against The Establishment and, generally, tried to fight for what they considered the right causes. They also tried to adapt their own lifestyle to their ideals. But a quarter of a century or more later, circumstances have forced them to change: Will and Claire have long split up. Will is now a minor actor doing TV commercials and sharing his flat with his grown-up daughter, Frankie. Claire is abroad most of the time doing charity work in Third World countries. Although raised to be a critical and independent young woman, Frankie has nevertheless adopted one or two characteristics of her own generation. When the play opens she is having an affair with Ben, a young man her age who works in the phone centre of some courier service.

Will meets a woman in her early thirties, Kate, who is desperate to find a man who will make her pregnant. She thinks she has found the right one in Will when they meet by chance. Will is too weak to openly tell her that, at 48, he would rather not be a father again. At the same time, at a book launch, Frankie—who goes there instead of her father—is chatted up by Hugh. Hugh is in fact her godfather and an old friend of her parents', but over the past decades they have drifted apart. At first Frankie openly tells him that he is too old for her ("I don't do dinners"), but then she genuinely (or so) falls in love with him and chucks Ben, who, as a consequence, turns pathological and starts following her around, declaring his love for her. Hugh has become a bestselling author under the nom de plume of Alice Wilde, writing popular novels where "something happens in every paragraph" (Will). This is how Hugh has got rid of his old convictions—by making money and being successful (and even being offered an OBE). He has left his wife and his three kids and now starts living with Frankie.

Gradually, the follies of their youth come to the surface. Early in May 1997, at Hugh's flat, they all come together to have an election party (with the TV turned off), clinging to what has been left of their left-wing ideals and reminiscing about the old days. (For example, Will has brought two heavy boxes containing all his vinyl records of the 1960s and 1970s, which he gives to Frankie as a present.) They smoke a joint together (including Frankie—this is how she has been brought up, too). Their meeting is also some kind of reunion: for the first time after more than a year, Will and Claire see their daughter again.

From Hugh's point of view, their (married) life is not really so great as may be expected. Hugh misses his children enormously (they still phone him and tell him about the little things they have just been doing) but he is not at all encouraged by Frankie to go and see them. Hugh has been given a seven-figure contract for three new novels, but now, after the first one, he seems to have writer's block. Hugh and Frankie have been travelling around a lot, Hugh has sold his house in India, and under Frankie's influence, they have given a considerable amount of money to charitable causes (the wrong ones, Claire thinks). Hugh asks Will to explain his looming financial crisis to Frankie, but Will refuses ("She's your problem now.").

During that election party Claire, high on pot, talks about her fling with Hugh way back in the 1970s—an affair Will knew about and (willy-nilly) approved of but which is news to the horrified Frankie. It turns out that Claire's life has not been easy: She has been held responsible for the deaths of a group of freedom fighters in Africa who, as she claims, acted against her instructions and who were shot by enemies. As far as her private life is concerned, she admits that she has been chasing a French doctor across half the continent, but in the end he found someone else. Now she offers Will to move in with her again.

Will, however, has other plans. He has an on-and-off relationship with Kate. It takes Kate a long time (too long really) to find out that Will does not want to make her pregnant ("Did you come this morning? Did you ejaculate?"—this is what she asks him in front of the others. Only gradually does he admit that he has faked an orgasm.). In order not to have to admit that he is unwilling to be a father again, he is even prepared to pay £2,000 for artificial insemination (IVF). Will and Kate go to the clinic together, Kate is operated on and six of her eggs are removed from her womb for insemination with Will's sperm. But Will is not capable (mentally rather than physically) to ejaculate in the small room that has been provided for that purpose. (He claims to be completely exhausted, and that his mobile phone started ringing while he was trying.) So Kate walks out on him. In the final scene, however, she is nine months pregnant. Will readily admits he is not the father but he and Kate will stay together, and he will assist her in bringing up her child, although—the biological father being black ("Nigerian") -- everybody will realize that it is not his child.

== Cast ==
- Will Ron Cook
- Kate Julie Graham
- Frankie Rachael Stirling
- Hugh Art Malik
- Claire Charlotte Cornwell
- Ben Craig Kelly
