= Extra Foods =

Former subsidiary of the Loblaw Companies

- Company type: Subsidiary
- Industry: Retail
- Founded: 1982; 44 years ago
- Defunct: September 25, 2024; 20 months ago
- Fate: Stores converted to No Frills, Your Independent Grocer, and Real Canadian Superstore or closed
- Headquarters: Brampton, Ontario
- Number of locations: 106 (2006; peak)
- Area served: Western Canada
- Parent: Loblaw Companies
- Website: extrafoods.ca

Extra Foods (also branded as extrafoods) was a Canadian supermarket chain, part of Loblaw Companies Limited. Founded in 1982, the chain had 106 locations at its peak in 2006 and were located through most of Western Canada. Most Extra Foods stores were smaller than its sister chain, Real Canadian Superstore, and most locations were in smaller, rural communities. Extra Foods is similar to Ontario's Your Independent Grocer/Zehrs banners, as well as Quebec's Provigo banner.

In 2008, Loblaw began converting some locations to the similar No Frills format already used for the company's deep-discount stores in Ontario.

In 2010, Loblaw began converting some locations to a new format similar to the "Great Foods" stores found in Ontario, some of which have since converted to Your Independent Grocer. Mostly due to not meeting sales expectations. In 2017, the chain's last Regina location was replaced by a new Real Canadian Superstore on the same property. In April 2022, the chain's last Saskatoon location closed.

On September 26, 2024, the chain's last two locations in Drumheller and Quesnel were converted to No Frills.

== See also ==
- Real Canadian Wholesale Club
- List of supermarket chains in Canada
