= Oakville GO Station =

Railway station in Ontario, Canada

Oakville
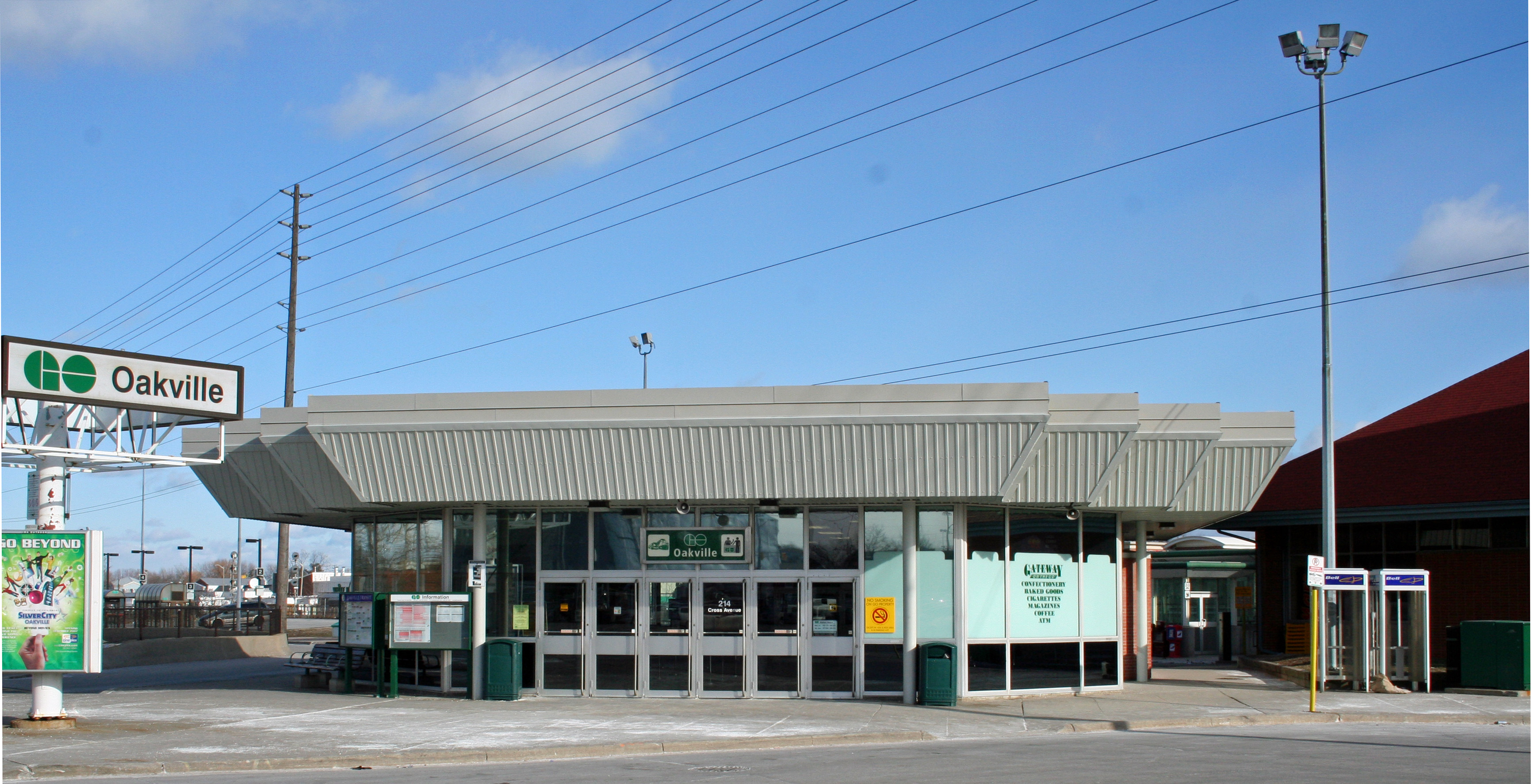
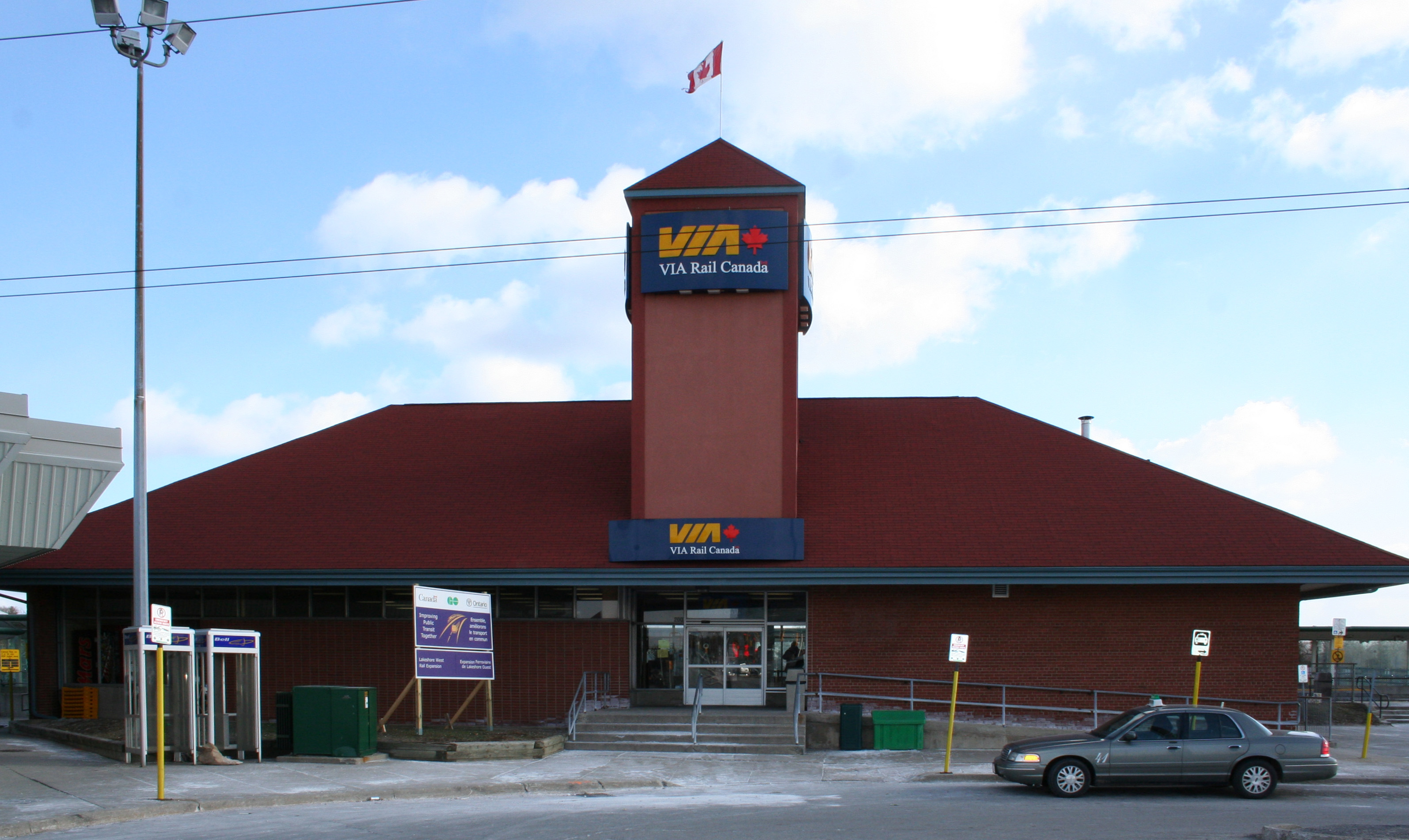
- GO Transit station building Via Rail station building

General information
- Location: 214 Cross Avenue (GO Transit); 200 Cross Avenue (Via Rail); Oakville, Ontario; Canada
- Coordinates: 43°27′18″N 79°40′57″W
- Owner: Metrolinx
- Platforms: 1 side, 2 island platform
- Tracks: 4
- Bus routes: 22 18 56
- Connections: Oakville Transit

Construction
- Parking: 4,401 spaces + 2 electric vehicle parking/charging stations
- Cycle facilities: Rack
- Accessible: Yes

Other information
- Status: Staffed station (Via Rail)
- Station code: GO Transit: OA; Via Rail: OAKV; Amtrak: OKL
- Fare zone: 13

History
- Opened: May 23, 1967; 59 years ago
- Rebuilt: 2012
- Electrified: September 2035; 8 years' time (Lakeshore West; planned)

Passengers
- 10,270 daily
- Rank: 2 (GO Transit)

Services
| Preceding station | Via Rail | Following station |
|---|---|---|
| Aldershot toward Windsor | Windsor–Toronto | Toronto Terminus |
| Aldershot toward New York | Maple Leaf | Toronto Terminus |
| Preceding station | GO Transit | Following station |
| Bronte towards Confederation | Lakeshore West | Clarkson towards Union |
| Bronte towards Hamilton or Niagara Falls | Lakeshore West (peak express) | Clarkson towards Union |
| Burlington towards Niagara Falls | Lakeshore West (off-peak express) | Port Credit towards Union |
Former services
| Preceding station | Via Rail | Following station |
|---|---|---|
| Burlington 1989–1993 toward New York | Maple Leaf | Toronto Terminus |
| Burlington West 1981–1989 toward New York | Maple Leaf | Toronto Terminus |
| Preceding station | Amtrak | Following station |
| Burlington West toward Chicago | International 1982–1990 | Toronto Terminus |
| Preceding station | Canadian National Railway | Following station |
| Hamilton toward Sarnia | Grand Trunk Railway; Main Line | Sunnyside toward Montreal |
| Bronte toward Suspension Bridge | Niagara Falls – Toronto; Local stops | Clarkson toward Toronto |
Location

Oakville GO Station is a railway and bus station in Oakville, Ontario, Canada. It is serviced by GO Transit's Lakeshore West line and routes along Via Rail's Quebec City–Windsor Corridor.

Oakville is the second-busiest station on the GO network after Union Station in Toronto. Until October 2007, it served as the western terminus for weekend service. On weekdays, one branch of the Highway 407 GO bus service, that connects with Sheridan College's Trafalgar Campus, Square One Bus Terminal, Bramalea GO Station, and Highway 407 Bus Terminal terminates at this station.

It is served by Via Corridor intercity routes between Windsor and Toronto, and the joint Amtrak–Via Maple Leaf service between New York City and Toronto.

== History ==
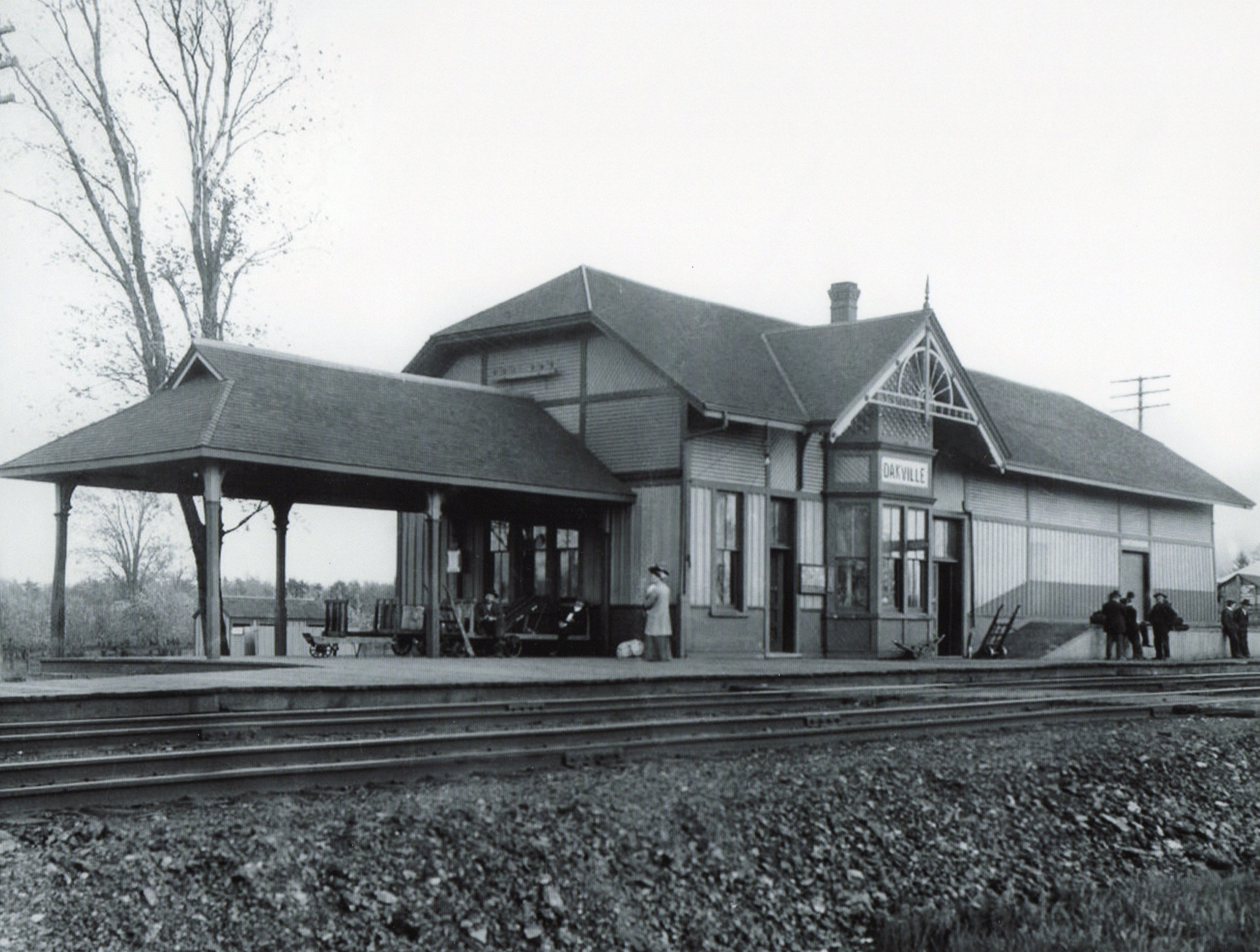
Oakville station, circa 1920

The Grand Trunk Railway was important to the development of Oakville because it was the major transportation link for goods and people to Toronto or Hamilton, and beyond. The original Great Western Railway station was built here in 1856, on the same site as the current VIA and GO Stations. The Great Western Railway was purchased in 1882 by the Grand Trunk Railway, which was absorbed into the Canadian National Railway in 1920.

Between 2009 and 2012, improvements on the Lakeshore West line added a third mainline track requiring the demolition of the Via Rail station and the construction of a new fully accessible building. Vehicular access was improved and a covered drop off and pick up area was created with more than 1,000 new parking spaces added in a new six-storey parking structure. The bus shelters were replaced with heated shelters in the spring of 2015.

In 2018, Fortinos signed a deal with Metrolinx to have a PC Express kiosk and pick-up van at this station for online orders. On October 21, 2026, a Second Cup cafe location opened inside the main GO Transit station building.

A major renovation of the station began in May 2026. The project will include a refurbished station building and platforms, digital signage, a new accessible pedestrian bridge, four elevators and staircases to the platforms and existing parking structure, and an enhanced bus loop with six additional platforms.

== Connecting bus routes ==
Oakville Transit

- 4 Speers-Cornwall
- 5/5A Dundas
- 10 West Industrial (peak service only)
- 11 Linbrook
- 13 Westoak Trails
- 14/14A Lakeshore West
- 15 Bridge
- 18 Glen Abbey South
- 19 River Oaks
- 20 Northridge
- 26 Falgarwood
- 28 Glen Abbey North
- 120 East Industrial (peak service only)
- 121 Southeast Industrial (peak service only)
- 190 River Oaks Express (peak service only)

GO Transit

- 18 Lakeshore West
- 56 Hwy 407 West
