= PC Express =

Online grocery pickup service

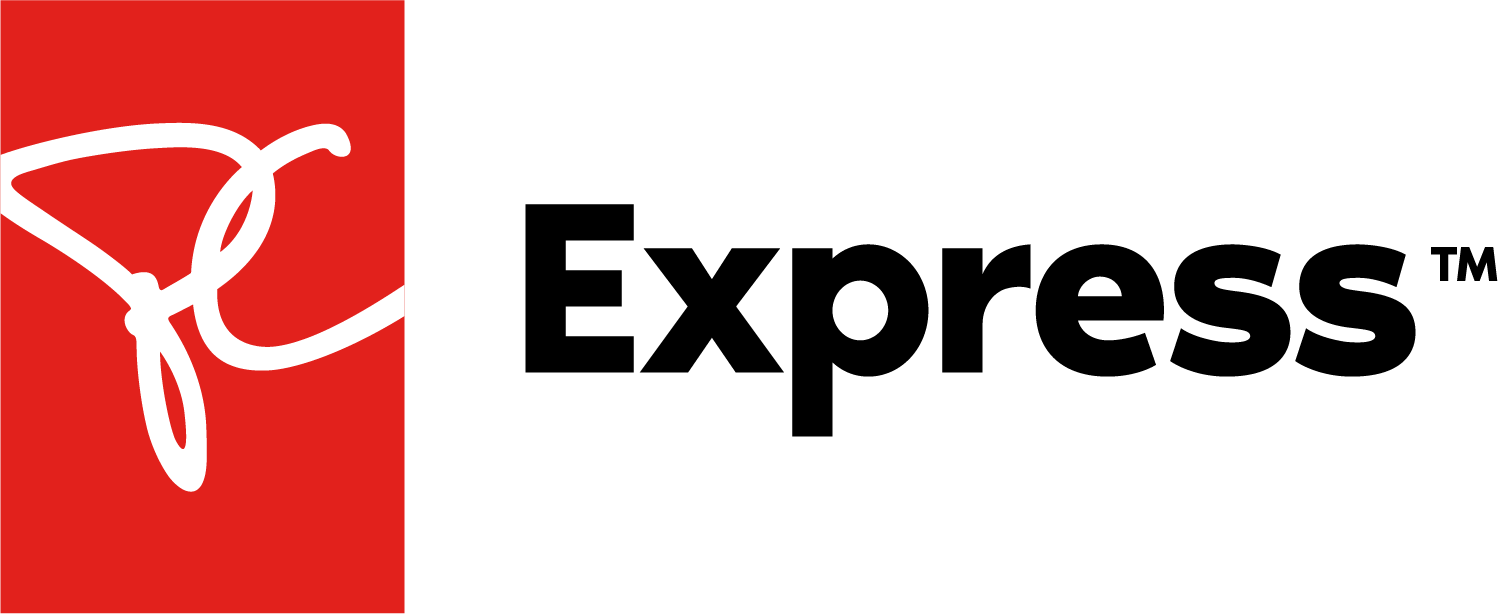
- Predecessor: Loblaws Click & Collect
- Founded: October 24, 2014; 12 years ago
- Number of locations: 737 (2024)
- Parent: Loblaw Companies
- Website: pcexpress.ca iOS app

PC Express is a grocery click and collect and delivery service owned by Canadian retail conglomerate Loblaw Companies. The service began in October 2014 and the company now has over 700 pickup locations and delivers to approximately 70% of Canadian households. These locations include curbside pickup, self-serve kiosks, refrigerated vans, and Shoppers Drug Mart locations in urban areas. The Loblaw Companies banners participating in PC Express are Dominion, Fortinos, Loblaws, Maxi, No Frills, Provigo, Real Atlantic Superstore, Real Canadian Superstore, Valu-mart, Your Independent Grocer and Zehrs Markets. A service fee of $3 to $5 is added to each order, unless a customer has a PC Express Pass subscription. Delivery at many locations is not performed by the company's own employees but outsourced to delivery apps such as DoorDash and UberEats for drivers. A rapid delivery option with marked up item costs is also available at some locations.

Instacart is often conflated as being the same service, as it also offers deliveries from Superstore and Shopper's locations in many places, but it is a separate service not affiliated with the stores they can deliver from.

== History ==
Click and Collect at Loblaws stores began in fall 2014 with a product selection of around 20,000 items, and had expanded to 60 active locations by June 2016. The first location had a drive-through; however, subsequent locations have used dedicated parking spots instead. By November 2015, the program had expanded to include Real Canadian Superstore locations in British Columbia. In December 2017, Loblaw Companies began offering click and collect in Atlantic Canada, starting with Halifax. By the start of 2018, about 300 stores were on the PC Express network, with plans to significantly expand the program to over 700 locations by year end. In February 2018, Loblaw Companies signed a partnership with Metrolinx to begin offering grocery pick-up at some GO Transit stations in the greater Toronto area. In November 2018, Loblaws began testing a self-checkout like feature in the PC Express mobile app at five of its Ontario stores, allowing customers to scan items as they shop and pay at the checkout.

In 2020, Loblaw initiated a pilot program with Gatik, an American autonomous vehicle company to trial driverless trucks for online order deliveries. In 2022, some driverless trucks were launched for select orders, with a safety driver in the passenger seat.

== See also ==
- joefresh.com, the e-commerce site of Loblaw Companies' fast fashion banner
- shop.shoppersdrugmart.ca, the e-commerce site for Shoppers Drug Mart products
