= Real Canadian Liquorstore =

Canadian chain store

- Type: Subsidiary
- Industry: Retail
- Number of locations: 40 (2022)
- Area served: Alberta; Saskatchewan
- Products: Liquor
- Brands: Your Independent Liquorstore
- Owner: Loblaw Companies
- Parent: Loblaws Inc.
- Website: realcanadianliquorstore.ca

Real Canadian Liquorstore is a Canadian chain of liquor stores owned by the Loblaws Inc. subsidiary of the Canadian supermarket operator Loblaw Companies.

The chain operates exclusively in Alberta and Saskatchewan—provinces that have authorized the establishment of private liquor stores. Real Canadian Liquorstore locations are co-located on the same property as another Loblaw grocery store, particularly Real Canadian Superstore, from which the chain derives its name. Three locations (Red Deer, Edson, Fort McMurray) attached to Your Independent Grocer locations are likewise branded as Your Independent Liquorstore, but are typically located in a standalone building. (Alberta law forbids liquor stores from being directly combined with a grocery store or similar operation.)

Real Canadian Liquorstores sell a wide selection of liquor products such as beer, wine and hard liquor, including those under Loblaws' President's Choice brand. They also have the rights to Medallion Rum, Vodka, Rye, and Gin as well as the Toscano white and Red Cask wines. Real Canadian Liquorstore also sells some select wines that are exclusive to their stores.

As of December 2022, the Alberta Gaming and Liquor Commission listed 42 licensed Real Canadian Liquorstore locations. After the province began to issue more private liquor licenses, Loblaw opened the chain's first Saskatchewan location as a store within a store at a Superstore in Yorkton in October 2018. The following month, Loblaw announced the planned opening of three new Real Canadian Liquorstore locations in Moose Jaw, Regina, and Saskatoon.
