= QHR Technologies =

Canadian healthcare technology company

QHR Technologies Inc.
- Type: Public company
- Industry: Healthcare Software
- Founded: 2000
- Headquarters: Kelowna, British Columbia, Canada
- Key people: Michael Checkley, President
- Products: electronic medical record systems
- Brands: Medeo; AccuroEMR
- Number of employees: 500
- Website: qhrtechnologies.com

QHR Technologies Inc. (QHR) is a Canadian healthcare technology company, founded in 2000. It represents 20 percent of the country's medical record market and its Medeo and AccuroEMR products are used by about 16,400 health professionals.

== History ==
In 2013, QHR sold Quadrant to Logibec Groupe Informatique.

In 2014, QHR acquired Medeo, a patient-doctor online connection application developer whose virtual care application is used by about 5,000 physicians in British Columbia.

In 2016, Olympic athlete Hayley Wickenheiser joined QHR as a spokesperson.

In June 2016, QHR announced plans to collaborate with TELUS Health to improve communications between healthcare providers. The companies intend to create a secure electronic communication solution to allow the more than 23,000 Canadian physicians on their EMR platforms to communicate seamlessly, regardless of the EMR platform they're on.

In August 2016, QHR received a $170 million purchase offer from Loblaw Companies, the consortium owning Shopper's Drug Mart, Canada's largest chain of pharmacies. The board approved the offer and QHR was purchased by Loblaw Companies.

== Medeo ==
Medeo
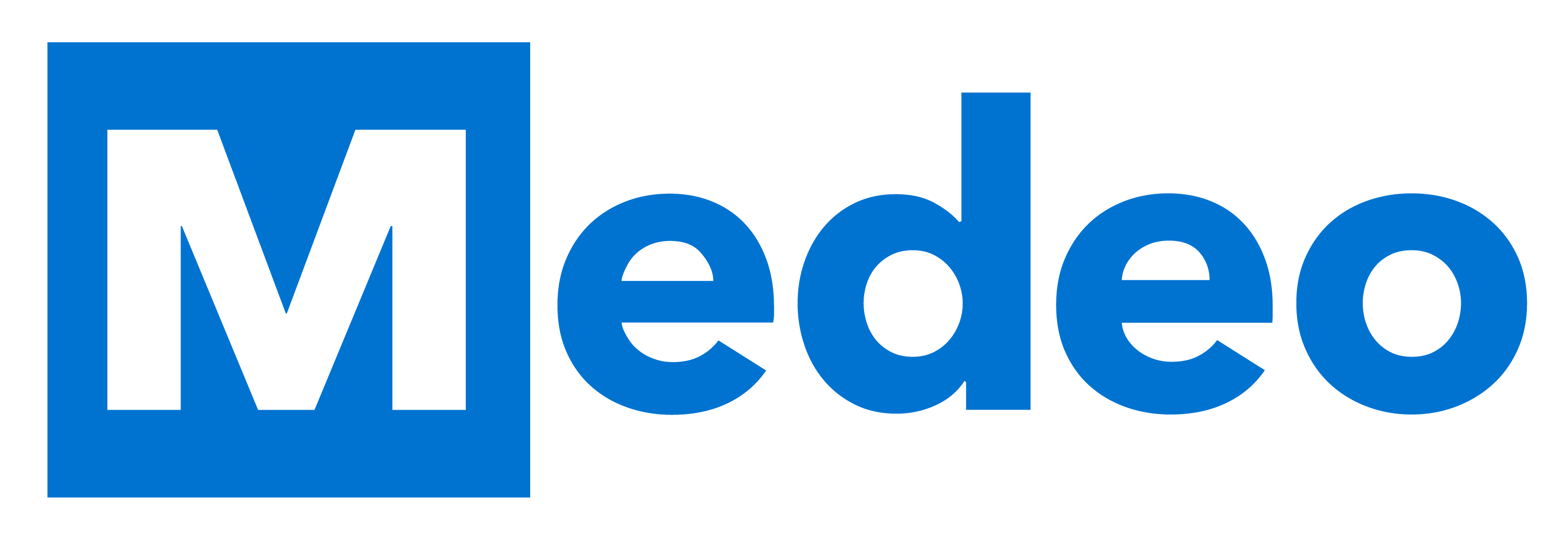
- Company type: Public
- Founded: Vancouver, BC, Canada (2012)
- Headquarters: 208 – 128 West 6th Ave., Vancouver, BC Canada
- Area served: Worldwide
- Industry: Internet
- Parent: QHR Technologies Inc.
- Website: medeohealth.com
- Registration: Required
- Launched: September 2012; 14 years ago
- Current status: Active

Medeo is QHR's virtual care technology which connects health providers with their patients online for private video visits, secure messaging, and other virtual care applications. Patients are able to connect with their health providers via smartphone (iOS or Android), tablet, or computer. The company that initially developed the app (Medeo) was acquired by QHR in November 2014.

Medeo has been used for general consultations, prescriptions, follow-ups, specialist referrals, and all non-emergencies.
