= Valu-mart =

Canadian supermarket chain, a subsidiary of the Loblaw Companies

Valumart Ltd.

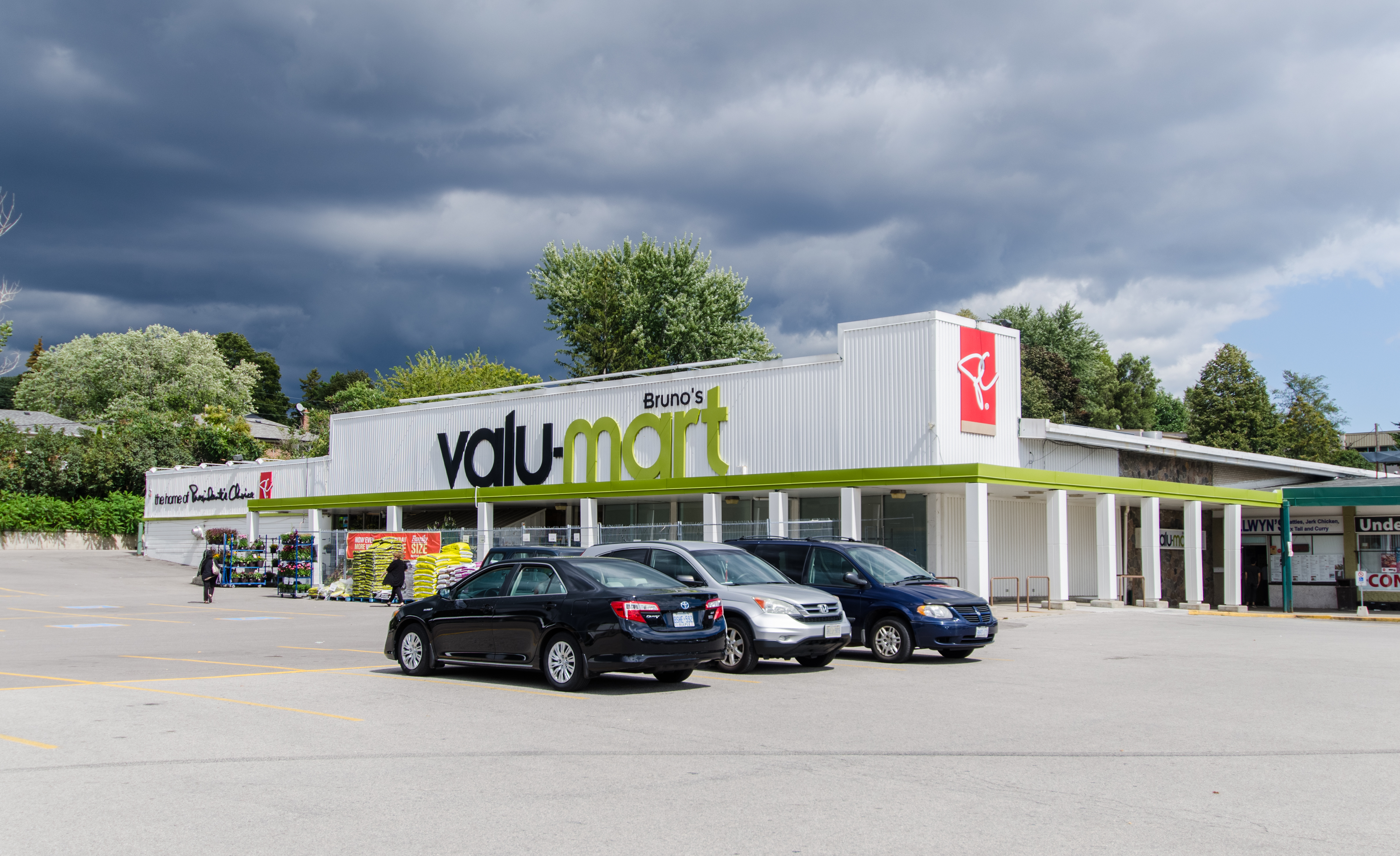
- Valu-Mart store in Don Mills, Toronto, Ontario.
- Trade name: Valu-mart
- Company type: Subsidiary
- Industry: Retail
- Founded: 1980; 46 years ago
- Number of locations: 27 (2024)
- Area served: Ontario; Quebec
- Products: Bakery, dairy, deli, frozen foods, gardening centre, general grocery, general merchandise, meat & poultry, pharmacy, photolab, produce, seafood, snacks
- Parent: Loblaw Companies
- Website: http://www.valumart.ca/

Valu-mart (styled as valu-mart) is a chain of supermarkets based in Ontario, Canada. It is a unit of National Grocers, itself a unit of Loblaw Companies Limited, Canada's largest food distributor.

Stores are typically operated by a franchise owner. The stores operate in smaller locations than others operated by Loblaw Companies Limited, and are often opened in former locations where other Loblaw Companies Limited stores had been, including those formerly operated under the Zehrs or Mr. Grocer banners.

All Valu-mart stores are located in the province of Ontario with one additional store located in Shawville, Quebec.

== See also ==
- Your Independent Grocer
- List of supermarket chains in Canada
