= SaveEasy =

Canadian grocery store franchise

- Company type: Supermarket
- Industry: Retail
- Founded: 1959; 67 years ago
- Defunct: November 4, 2014; 11 years ago
- Fate: Rebranded
- Successor: Your Independent Grocer
- Headquarters: Canada
- Area served: Atlantic Canada
- Parent: Loblaw Companies
- Website: http://saveeasy.ca/

Earlier SaveEasy logo, in use in 2007.

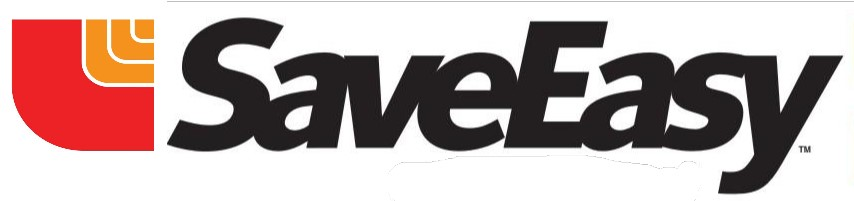
Final SaveEasy Logo before conversion to Independent Banner

Save Easy Logo 80-90s, saveeasy

SaveEasy (formerly Atlantic Save-Easy) was a chain of small retail grocery store franchises in the Atlantic Provinces of Newfoundland and Labrador, New Brunswick, Nova Scotia, and Prince Edward Island, owned by Loblaw Companies.

The chain was owned by Atlantic Wholesalers Ltd. of Sackville, New Brunswick, and the first SaveEasy opened in 1959, followed by rapid expansion to quickly become the region's second-largest grocery banner, behind Sobeys.

Loblaws entered the Maritime provinces in 1976 when they purchased Atlantic Wholesalers. During a period of restructuring SaveEasy stores introduced Loblaw house brands such as No Name during the recession of the early 1980s, and SaveEasy's logo was updated to match the Loblaws logo. In some instances, certain SaveEasy stores were converted from franchise-owned to corporate-owned stores, and their name was changed to the "No Frills" brand during this time. There were also some larger SaveEasy stores that carried the name SaveEasy Warehouse Foods, that were typically found in shopping malls, while most SaveEasy stores were stand-alone locations.

Most SaveEasy stores in urban areas were closed or converted to the larger Atlantic SuperValu or the mega-size Atlantic Superstore concepts, and the remaining Atlantic SaveEasy stores were redesigned.

The SaveEasy name, with a few exceptions, is now usually found in small towns and rural areas while the Atlantic SuperValu brand has largely disappeared as the company standardized its brands.

While still considered a separate chain, in 2008, SaveEasy adopted branding very similar to that of Quebec's Provigo, also owned by Loblaw. The "P" in the Provigo logo is changed to an "S", and the SaveEasy slogan "So quick, so good!", is a translation of Provigo's "Si vite, si bon!"

On November 4, 2014, Loblaws announced that the SaveEasy brand would be phased out in favor of its Your Independent Grocer brand in use in the rest of Canada. The changeover was completed in 2016.

== Locations ==
=== New Brunswick ===
25 locations:

- Balmoral
- Bath
- Beresford
- Champdoré
- Chipman
- Dalhousie
- Doaktown
- Grand Manan Island
- Hampton
- McAdam
- Minto
- Nackawic-Millville
- Petit-Rocher
- Sackville
- Saint-Quentin
- Salisbury
- Shippagan
- Southern Victoria
- St. Andrews
- St. Stephen (2 locations)
- Tobique Valley
- Tracadie
- St. George
- Sussex (became a Superstore in 2006)

=== Newfoundland and Labrador ===
5 locations:

- Gambo
- Harbour Breton
- Lewisporte
- Twillingate
- Wesleyville

=== Nova Scotia ===
15 locations:

- Annapolis Royal
- Bridgewater,
- Berwick
- Chester
- Guysborough
- Hantsport
- Hubbards
- Kentville
- Lunenburg
- Mahone Bay
- Meteghan
- Middleton
- Oxford
- Stewiacke
- Wolfville
- Yarmouth

=== Prince Edward Island ===
3 locations:

- Alberton
- Kensington
- Souris

== See also ==
- List of supermarkets
