= Freshmart =

Canadian supermarket chain

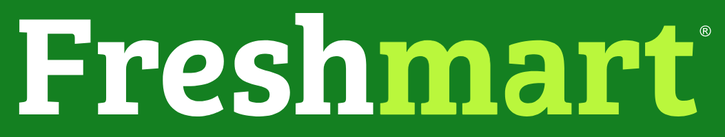
- Company type: Subsidiary
- Industry: Retail
- Headquarters: Brampton, Ontario
- Products: Bakery, dairy, deli, frozen foods, gardening centre, general grocery, general merchandise, meat & poultry, produce, seafood, snacks
- Parent: Loblaw Companies
- Website: www.freshmart.ca

Freshmart is a chain of supermarkets based in Ontario, Canada. It is a unit of Loblaw Companies Limited, Canada's largest food distributor.

== Background ==
Freshmart stores are typically operated by a franchise owner. The stores operate in smaller locations than others operated by Loblaw Companies Limited, typically in rural communities.

== See also ==
- List of supermarket chains in Canada
