= Zehrs Markets =

Southern Ontario subsidiary of the Loblaw Companies

Zehrmart Inc.

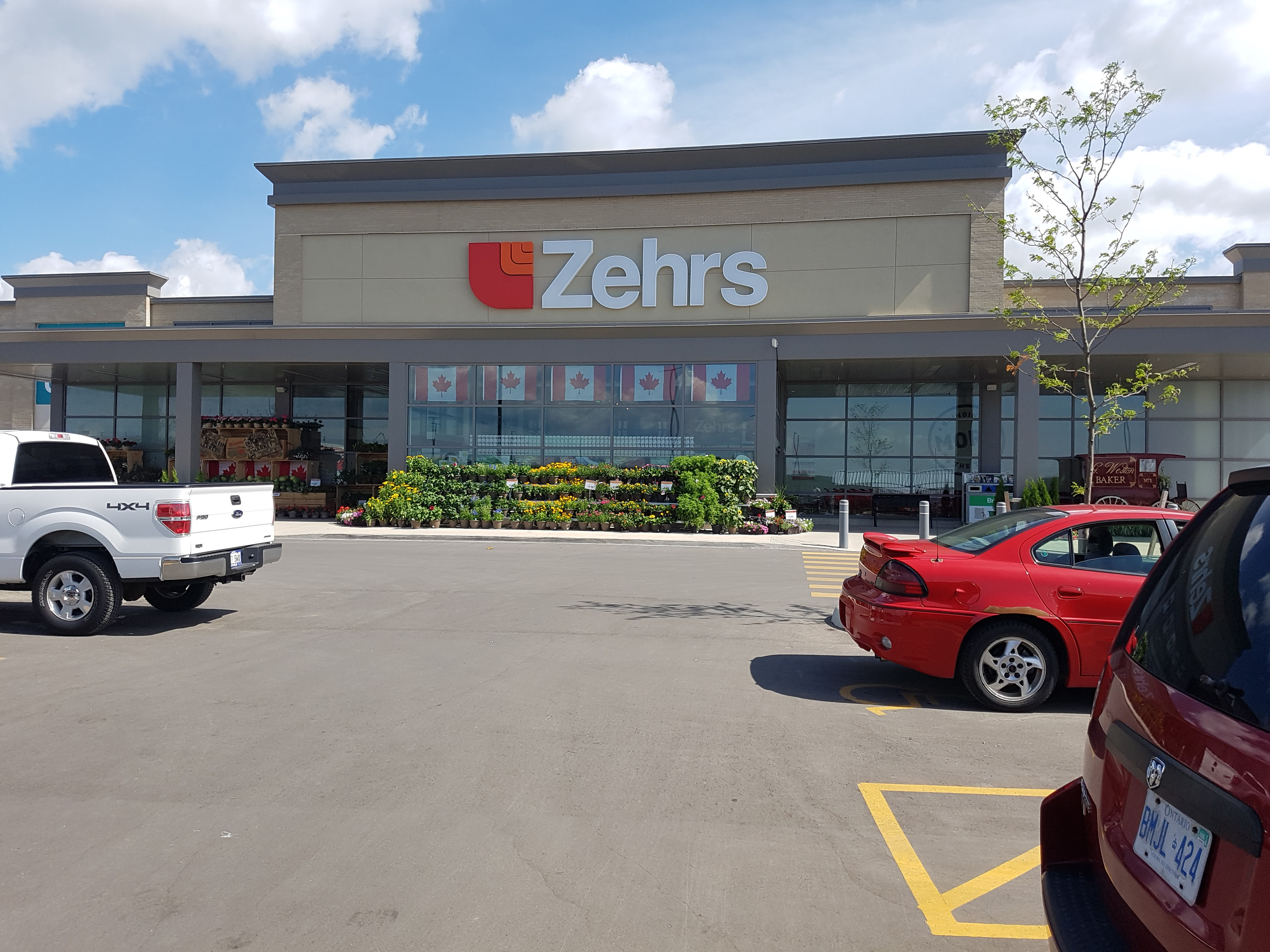
- A store located in Barrie, Ontario
- Trade name: Zehrs Markets
- Type: Subsidiary
- Industry: Retail; Supermarket
- Founded: 1950; 76 years ago in Kitchener, Ontario, Canada
- Headquarters: 1 Presidents Choice Circle, Brampton, Ontario, Canada
- Number of locations: 42 (2024)
- Area served: Southern Ontario
- Brands: President's Choice; No Name
- Services: Community room, Dry cleaning, Click and collect (PC Express), Fashion (Joe Fresh), Optical, Pharmacy, Walk-in clinic (Select locations)
- Parent: Loblaw Companies
- Slogan: (Zehrs) Bringing More to the Table.
- Website: zehrs.ca

Zehrmart Inc. (doing business as Zehrs Markets or simply Zehrs /zɛərz/) is a Canadian supermarket chain in southern Ontario. The chain has 42 locations and is a part of Loblaw Companies Limited, which purchased the Zehrs chain in the mid-1970s.

== History ==
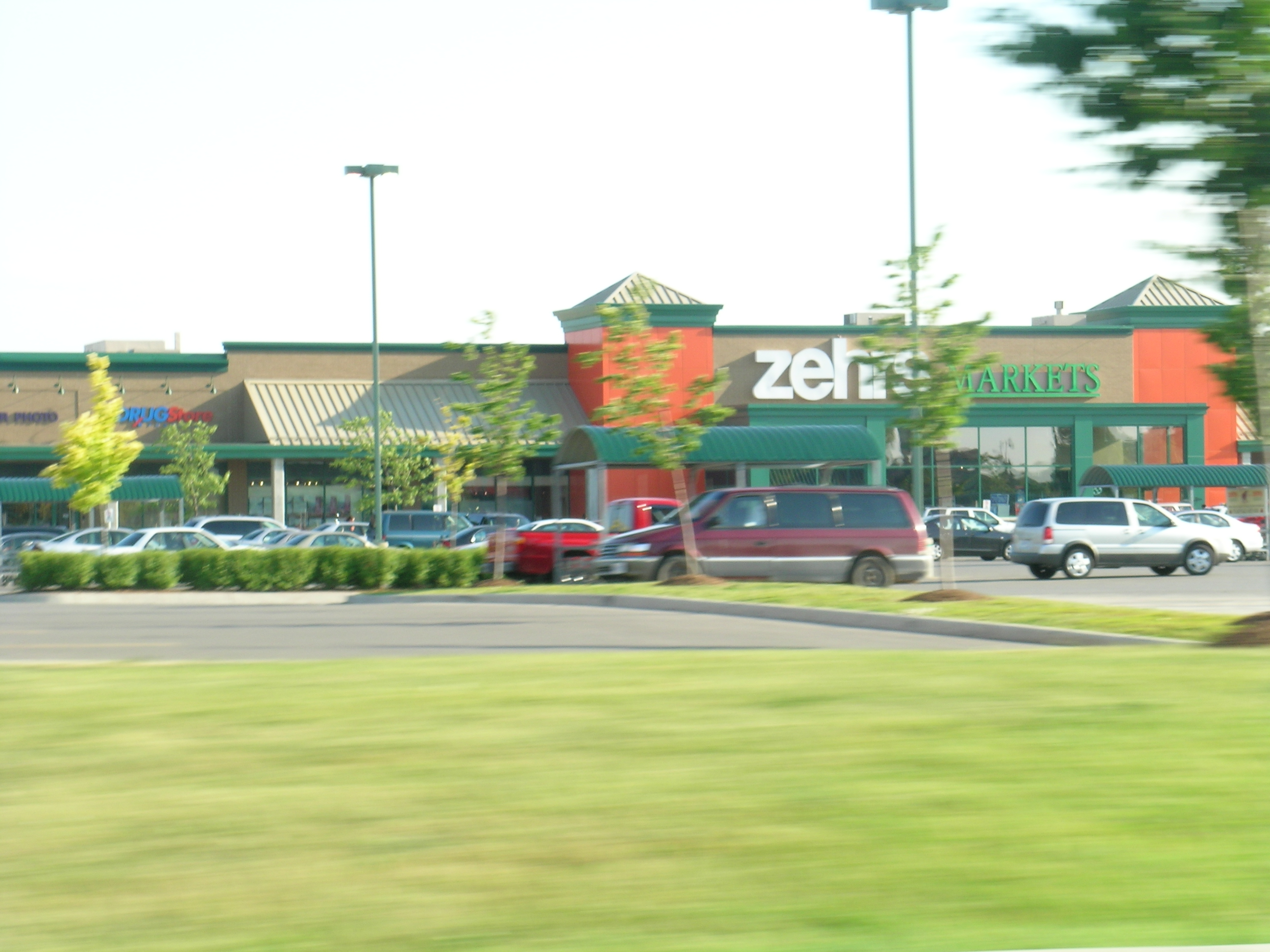
A Zehrs Markets store in Stratford, 2007

The first store was established by Emory Zehr and his sons in Kitchener in 1950 and was focused mainly on food. Some of the earliest locations were on Lancaster Street, Belmont Avenue and Highland Road in Kitchener. Until the 1980s, Zehrs had its own line of certain foods, including soda pop and potato chips; these were eventually replaced by Loblaws' President's Choice line of products. Television commercials for Zehrs included a brief tune with the words "When it comes right down to the one and only reason; you're important to us." Until 1995, the store's logo was a red or orange square, with two small lines to make it a boldened stylized "Z".

Zehrs stores have been known in Ontario by three distinct names: Zehrs Markets, Zehrs Food Plus and Zehrs Greatfood (similar to the new Loblaw Greatfood locations opened in the Greater Toronto Area). In 2010, Zehrs unveiled a new logo and store design, renovating several stores to the new format. The new stores are known as Zehrs Markets, as opposed to the new Zehrs Greatfood format that had been opened only a couple of years before. A Kingsville location was changed from a Greatfood to a Zehrs Markets, but is once again operating as a Zehrs Greatfood. The business entity is known as Zehrmart Ltd, which is operated by its parent company, Loblaw Companies Limited. Zehrs employees are represented by the United Food and Commercial Workers Local 1977 as well as the UFCW Local 175/633.

== Current operations ==
The administrative portion of this banner is located in Brampton, Ontario. Zehrs Markets regions are divided into three districts, numbered from 1–3. Every department in the store has its own specialist for its district, and further expansion into areas of marketing and merchandising are being utilized most recently.

Zehrs operates stores in large cities and small towns throughout southern Ontario. Locations stretch from Kingsville in the south to Orillia in the north, and from Windsor in the west to Niagara Falls in the east and northeast to Uxbridge. It does not have any locations in the Hamilton or Toronto metropolitan areas. It is notable that there are no Zehrs stores in the London-St. Thomas area right in the middle of Zehrs' main market area; that is one of the few areas of southern Ontario where Loblaws had several stores operating when it acquired Zehrs and due to the strength of the Loblaws name in that area that name was retained whereas other Loblaws locations scattered throughout southwestern Ontario were renamed to Zehrs. Locations of a chain of grocery stores in far southwestern Ontario (Windsor, Chatham, Kingsville, Sarnia) named Gordons were renamed to Zehrs in the 1990s. Loblaws has been introducing the Real Canadian Superstore banner to southwestern Ontario and some Zehrs have been renamed to that in recent years.

As a "one-stop" shop, Zehrs stores contain traditional departments such as fresh bakery, ready-meals (Fresh2Go), meat and produce, and newer non-traditional departments such as optical stores, wine shops, President's Choice Financial banking kiosks, clothing and electronics departments.

In March 2005, Zehrmart Ltd and Fortinos Grocery Stores (both under the Loblaw umbrella) merged their operations and are now run as one unit. In September 2005, all Ontario operations of Loblaw Companies Limited and the banners began moving into the newly constructed office at 1 President's Choice Circle, Brampton, Ontario.

As with other Loblaw stores, Zehrs is noted for carrying President's Choice products.

At newer stores, such as in Guelph or Barrie, the Zehrs logo has the familiar "L" logo from Loblaws added.

== Locations ==
There are 42 locations in Ontario.

== See also ==
- List of supermarket chains in Canada
