= Provigo =

Quebec supermarket chain of Loblaw

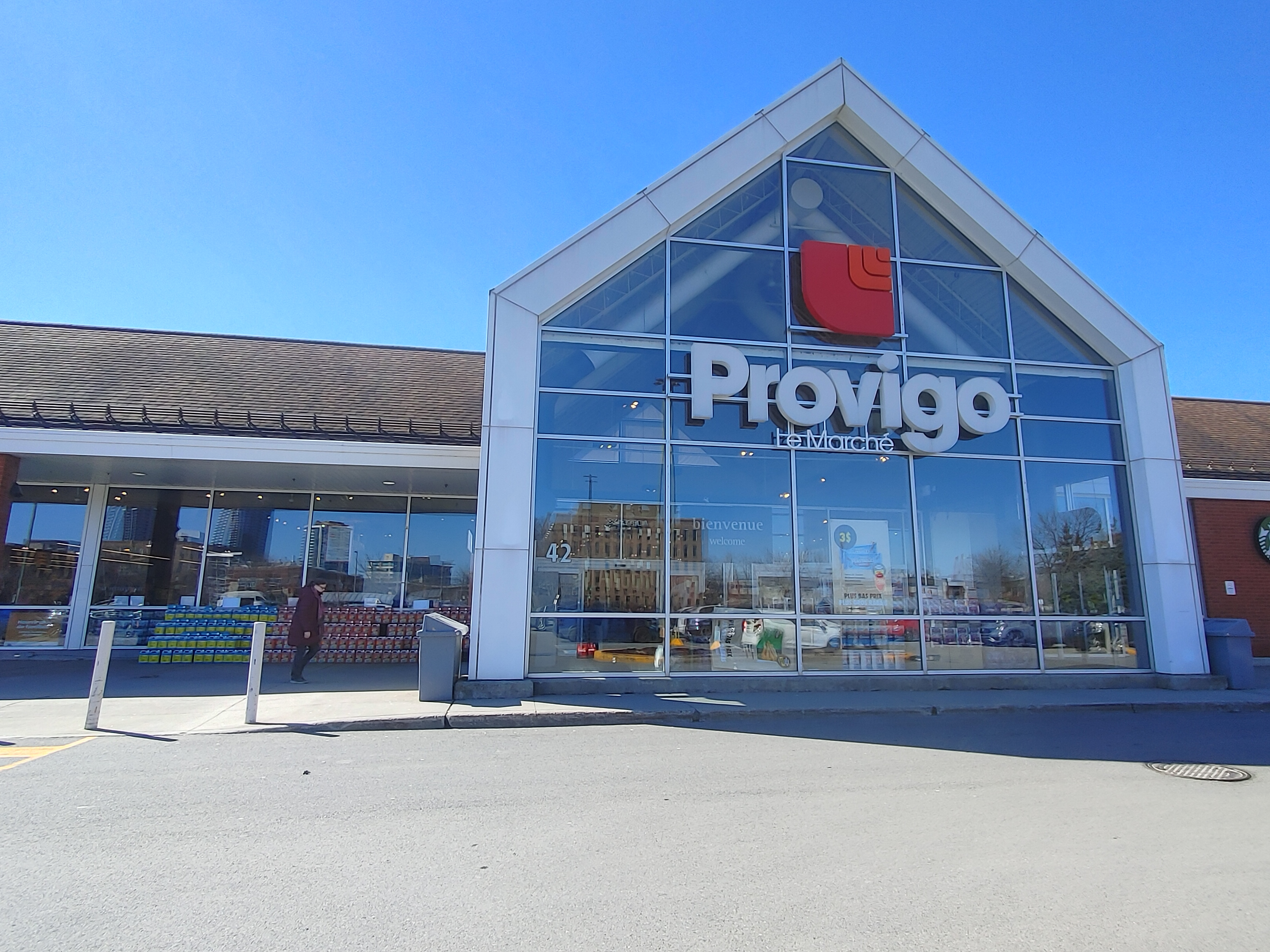
- A Provigo on Nuns' Island in Montreal, Quebec
- Formerly: Couvrette & Provost
- Type: Division
- Industry: Retail; Supermarket
- Founded: 1969; 57 years ago
- Headquarters: Montreal, Quebec, Canada
- Area served: Quebec
- Products: Bakery, beer, charcuterie, dairy, deli, frozen foods, general grocery, liquor*, meat & poultry, produce, seafood, snacks, wine *Select locations
- Brands: Sans Nom; le Choix du Président
- Services: Click and collect (PC Express), dietitian, dry cleaning, fashion (Joe Fresh), optical, pharmacy Select locations
- Number of employees: 5,700 (2007)
- Parent: Loblaw Companies Limited
- Website: provigo.ca

Provigo is a grocery retailer based in Quebec, Canada, consisting of over 300 stores and franchises throughout the province. It operates a retailing chain of stores and distribution warehouses. It is owned by Loblaw Companies Limited.

The chain's advertising slogan is "Si vite, si bon!" ("So quick, so good!")

== History ==
In 1969, in response to Canadian and American competition, a consortium of four Quebec wholesalers merged their activities with the intent to save costs and establish services as a big company. One of these people was Antoine Turmel who would become the first CEO of Provigo. Provigo was founded in 1969 under the Couvrette & Provost name, which was changed to Provigo in 1970.

At first, Provigo was only the holding company that used three names for its grocery operations: Provigain, Provibec and Provipop, in addition to other banners outside the "Provi" designation. It was not until the year 1980 that the Provigo name itself would become an actual store banner by replacing three of its grocery chains: Provigain, Jato and Aubaines Alimentaires. Its Provipop corner stores were renamed Jovi that year. The Provibec name survived another three years until its 285 stores were given the new AXEP banner in early May 1983. Provigo's chain of convenience stores Provi-Soir (est.1974) was not impacted by these rebrandings and retained its name until its merger with Couche-Tard in the late 1990s.

Acquisitions of Provigo over the years have included Dominion, A&P Montréal and other supermarket chains in Quebec as well as selected Steinberg stores in 1992. Among its non-supermarket acquisitions are Sports Experts in 1981 and Consumers Distributing in 1987.

After many years of growth, the Caisse de dépôt et placement du Québec purchased a stake in Provigo and named Pierre Lortie to head the company and ousted Pierre Lessard who would become president of Aetna and, after that, the CEO of Metro Inc, an important competitor of Provigo.

For various reasons, Provigo faced financial problems in the 1980s, notably because of its easy target in political agendas. For example, the Caisse de dépôt et placement du Québec offered the control of the company to Ungesco, a holding company by Bertin Nadeau. Nadeau unsuccessfully attempted to turn Provigo as the center of its financial empire. Also during those years, Provigo was facing ferocious competition from giant Steinberg to maintain its presence in the Quebec grocery industry. After winning the battle in a Pyrrhic style victory, Provigo sought to regain profitability.

In 1998, after becoming once again a profitable company, Provigo was purchased by Loblaw Companies Limited, putting an end to decades of the company in the hands of Quebecers. Although Loblaws introduced for the first time in Quebec stores under its namesake, it preserved the Provigo banner as well as the names Maxi, Maxi & Cie, L'Intermarché and AXEP; all of which were divisions of Provigo prior to its acquisition by Loblaws.

Beginning in 2008, the Provigo logo style and branding (but not the Provigo name itself, or the "P" logo) were repurposed for the SaveEasy chain in Atlantic Canada. SaveEasy and Provigo remain separate chains.

On July 18, 2013, Provigo introduced Provigo Le Marché, a new concept similar to Loblaws's flagship chain and particularly Loblaws CityMarket that was launched in English-speaking Canada the same date as "Provigo Le Marché" in Quebec. The first "Provigo Le Marché" store opened in Sherbrooke, Quebec. Since then, the Loblaws stores in Quebec have rebranded as "Provigo Le Marché" or simply as Provigo. The logo for Provigo Le Marché has the familiar "L" logo from Loblaws rather than the longtime "P" signage on traditional Provigo stores. Since November 2015, the "L" has been adopted chainwide and is no longer limited to "Provigo Le Marché" stores, as reflected on Provigo's website and its flyers.

In early 2023 Loblaws began the process of converting 20 Provigo stores into their lower cost Maxi brand.

== See also ==
- List of supermarket chains in Canada
