= Loblaw Companies =

Canadian retail company

Loblaw Companies Limited
- Type: Public subsidiary
- Traded as: TSX: L; S&P/TSX 60 component
- Industry: Retail
- Founded: 1919; 107 years ago in Toronto, Ontario, Canada
- Founders: Theodore Pringle Loblaw; J. Milton Cork
- Headquarters: Brampton, Ontario, Canada
- Key people: Galen Weston Jr. (chairman); Per Bank (president & CEO)
- Products: Apparel; Cash and carry; Discount store; Hypermarket; Supercentre; Supermarket; Superstore; Warehouse club
- Brands: See list
- Revenue: ▲CA$61.014 billion (2024)
- Operating income: ▲CA$3.902 billion (2024)
- Net income: ▲CA$2.275 billion (2024)
- Total assets: ▲CA$40.880 billion (2024)
- Total equity: ▼CA$11.266 billion (2024)
- Number of employees: 220,000 (2024)
- Parent: George Weston Limited (52.6%; as of 2023)
- Subsidiaries: Loblaws; Dominion Stores; CityMarket; Extra Foods (defunct); Fortinos; Freshmart; Maxi; No Frills; No Name; President's Choice; President's Choice Financial; Provigo; Real Atlantic Superstore; Real Canadian Liquorstore; Real Canadian Superstore; Shoppers Drug Mart / Pharmaprix; SuperValu; T & T Supermarket; Valu-mart; Your Independent Grocer; Your Independent Liquorstore; Zehrs Markets
- Website: loblaw.ca

Loblaw Companies Limited is a Canadian retailer established in 1919 and encompasses its corporate and franchise supermarkets operating under 22 regional and market-segment banners (including Loblaws), as well as pharmacies, banking and apparel. Loblaw operates a private label program that includes grocery and household items, clothing, baby products, pharmaceuticals, cellular phones, general merchandise and financial services. Loblaw is the largest Canadian food retailer, and its brands include President's Choice, No Name and Joe Fresh. It is controlled by George Weston Limited, a holding company controlled by the Weston family; Galen G. Weston is the chair of the Loblaw board of directors, as well as chair of the board of directors and CEO of Canada-based holding company George Weston.

Most of Loblaw's 220,000 full-time and part-time employees are members of the United Food and Commercial Workers, with the exception of workers at The Real Canadian Wholesale Club in Alberta, who are members of the Christian Labour Association of Canada.

Loblaw's regional food distribution divisions include Westfair Foods Ltd. in Western Canada and Northern Ontario, National Grocers Co. Ltd. in Ontario, Provigo Inc. in Quebec, and Atlantic Wholesalers Ltd. in Atlantic Canada.

== History ==
=== "We Sell for Less" ===
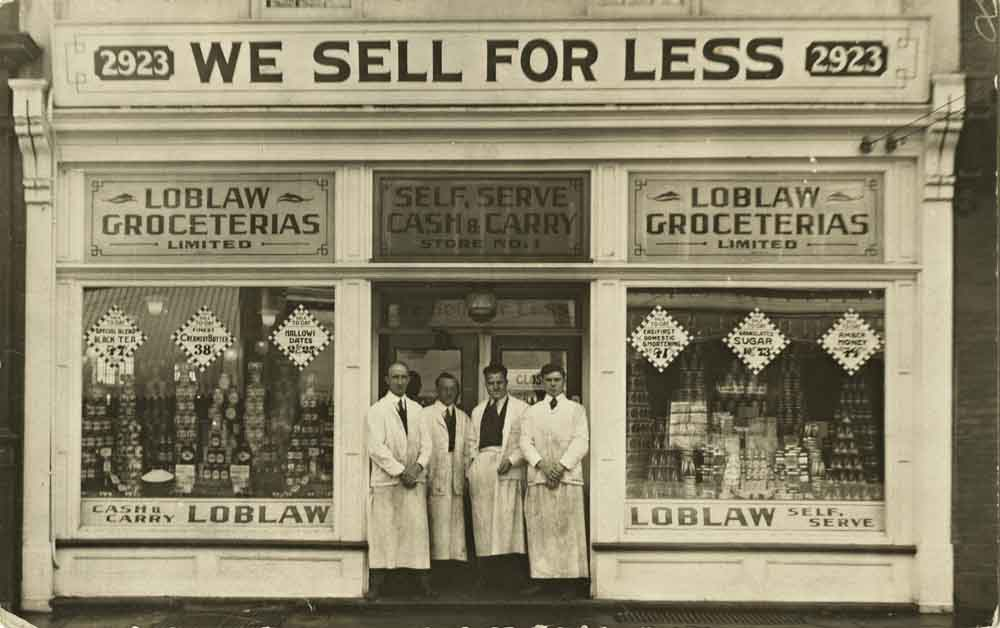
Loblaw Groceterias Limited, store No. 1, 2923 Dundas St. W., Toronto, Ontario, postcard, c. 1919

In 1919, Toronto grocers Theodore Pringle Loblaw and J. Milton Cork opened the first Loblaw Groceterias store modelled on a new and radically different retail concept, namely "self serve". The traditional grocery store provided a high level of personal service but was a labour-intensive operation. Customers typically had to wait while a clerk fetched items from behind a counter. Other goods, such as sugar and flour, had to be individually weighed and the order was then tallied by hand and added to the customer’s account. Home delivery, by wagon, was usually included free of charge. Loblaw and Cork, friends from the days when both worked as young clerks in the Cork family grocery store, believed they could cut costs by introducing self service combined with cash and carry. While cash stores were not new, the idea of allowing customers to select their own merchandise was a new concept. The pair had heard of the Piggly Wiggly "self-serving store" in the United States and travelled to Memphis, Tennessee, to see it in operation first hand. With customers allowed to browse freely, pick up their own goods and then pay cash at a central checkout counter, with no credit or home delivery, operating costs were reduced. The two came away convinced that a similar style of operation could work in Canada. But Loblaw was met with scepticism:

In the early days when I started the cash and carry business, I was told that it could not be done, but my contention was that the people of Toronto and Ontario would welcome the opportunity to carry their groceries home, providing I could offer them higher qualities at a much lower price than they were used to paying.

The first Loblaw Groceterias Co. store opened at 2923 Dundas St. W., Toronto, in June 1919. Months later, a second location, at 528 College Street, followed. The ’groceterias’ name was apparently derived from cafeteria – a popular self serve restaurant format. Along with the Loblaw name, the outlets featured big "We Sell For Less" signs across their storefronts. Inside, the stores were clean and well lit, with items neatly displayed and clearly marked:

From the entry, one passes through a turnstile which permits egress only. Just inside are piles of market baskets from which the customer helps himself and proceeds in his quest for food at lower prices. Out in front, the shelves are packed with bottled and canned goods, whose names are household words, all plainly tagged with price. Further back, one finds teas, coffee fancy biscuits and cheese, all wrapped ready to carry home .... The customer having selected her purchases, carries her basket to one of the counters near the point of exit. Here her purchases are quickly totaled on an adding machine and she receives her slip. While she pays the bill her groceries are neatly packed in a larger bag.."

While produce was limited and fresh meats largely excluded from the early stores, sales proved strong. Within its first five months of operation, the chain's second location had expanded its sales room into that part of the store normally reserved for storage. In spite of the success of the new groceteria format, Cork did not feel that traditional, full-service grocery stores were in danger of going out of business since many customers still valued the extension of credit, individual serve and home delivery. A year later, another Toronto grocer, C.B. Shields, joined with Loblaw and Cork.

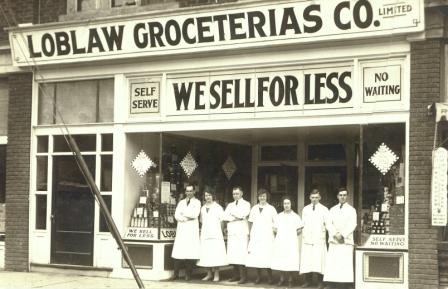
Loblaw Groceterias Co. Limited store, College St. and Palmerston Blvd., Toronto, postcard, c. 1923

In addition to being a proponent of self serve, Loblaw was also a firm believer in "the fundamentally sound principle of the chain store system" and its ability to deliver better price and superior quality to through its buying power. Three years after the opening of the first store, there were nine groceterias throughout Toronto. The company had also expanded into the United States with Loblaw Groceterias Inc. outlets in Buffalo, New York.

In 1928, with 69 stores throughout Ontario, the company unveiled its new state-of-the-art head office and warehouse at Fleet and Bathurst streets, along today's Lake Shore Blvd, in Toronto. At a cost of CA$1.25 million, the Loblaw warehouse was likened to a "temple of commerce" and hailed as a model of efficiency. One newspaper report described it as, "the most modern warehouse building of its kind in the dominion." The warehouse, which served as a distribution centre and manufacturing depot, included an interior loading dock that could simultaneously accommodate eight railway freight cars and 23 large trucks. It featured its own electric tram railway, four giant ovens for baking a ton of cake and half a ton of cookies a day, huge drums for blending tea, 670 metres (2,200 ft) of ammonia-filled pipes for refrigeration, and a system of pneumatic tubes for sending messages from department to department. A "punched card" tabulating system, forerunner to today's computer, would be installed for tracking inventory as the first of its kind in the Canadian grocery industry. For Loblaw employees, the warehouse included amenities such as bowling lanes and a billiards room, along with an auditorium for putting on plays. That same year, the American company expanded beyond New York State with the opening of outlets in Chicago, Illinois.

=== Depression and war ===
By October 1929, Loblaw Groceterias' rapid expansion had attracted the attention of competitor Dominion Stores Limited, another Toronto-based food store chain. In a letter to its shareholders, Dominion management put forward a plan to purchase a controlling interest in Loblaw, funded by a preferred share offering. Weeks later, though, stock markets around the world collapsed and the proposed acquisition never took place. In spite of the onset of the Great Depression, Loblaw continued to expand, albeit at a slower pace. By 1930, the chain boasted of 97 "spotlessly clean Groceterias" in Ontario. By 1936, that number had grown to 111, but press reports indicated the company had curtailed further expansion in order to increase the scope of its product offerings at the chain's existing outlets. Meanwhile, the company made a partial retreat from the U.S. market with the sale of its 77 Loblaw Groceterias Inc. stores in Chicago, Illinois, to the Jewel Tea Company. The stores had never shown a profit, although they had largely been turned around by the time of the sale. The company retained its 50 stores in Buffalo, New York, which were profitable operations.

In 1933, company co-founder Theodore Pringle Loblaw died suddenly of complications from minor surgery. Eulogized as "the Merchant Prince" by the press, Loblaw was remembered not only for his accomplishments in business but also his religious conviction and personal philanthropy that benefited local charities such as the Kiwanis Boys Clubs of Toronto and the Stevenson Memorial Hospital of his hometown of Alliston, Ontario. After Loblaw's death, co-founder John Milton Cork took charge of the company.

During the early 1930s, Loblaw Groceterias began converting many of its outlets to "Market Stores" that featured full-service meat and produce departments for the first time. Previously excluded because of the chain's 'self serve' format and the need to cut meats and weigh produce, the new departments proved popular with customers. By 1936, over half of all Ontario locations had been converted to the new format that expanded sales "without a corresponding increase in store overhead." The company also began updating the appearance of its stores to the new, modern, streamlined look. In terms of branding, while the chain often promoted itself as "Loblaw's" in newspaper ads, it was not until 1939 that the first "Loblaws" signs went up on store facades – replacing the Loblaw Groceterias Co. Limited signage. In addition to the new meat and produce departments, frozen food sections were also featured – a first in Canada. Loblaw also began introducing other modern amenities such as "electronic eye" automatic doors and mechanical ventilation systems for the comfort of shoppers.

=== Post-war expansion ===
Store construction, halted during World War II, resumed in the late 1940s as Loblaw undertook a program of "expansion and modernization." Parking lots, a new phenomenon for the chain, became an important design component of the company's "supermarkets" in the post-war era. In particular, Loblaw promoted its new "rear entrance and exit stores," with checkout counters at the back that allowed shoppers, increasingly motorized and suburban, direct access to their cars. Other modernizations included "healthfully-cool refrigerated" air conditioning, introduced by Loblaw in 1949 – the first Canadian grocery chain to do so. In spite of such innovations, the chain still hearkened back to its retail roots with references to the "self-serve" nature of its fruit, vegetable and meat departments.

=== Garfield Weston ===
In 1947, a major shift in corporate ownership took place with the purchase of 100,000 Class B shares of Loblaw Groceterias Co. Limited by Canadian industrialist W. Garfield Weston. Weston, president of George Weston Limited, whose interests included baking, grocery wholesaling, and paper manufacturing, acquired the block of voting stock from Loblaw co-founder J. Milton Cork. Although the share purchase did not represent majority control of Loblaw, Weston was able to have his old friend and colleague George C. Metcalf appointed to the board of directors, as well as named vice president and general manager. By 1953, though, Garfield Weston had secured majority control through parent company George Weston Limited and Metcalf was appointed president of Loblaw Groceterias. With Weston in control, a program of rapid expansion, particularly through acquisition, followed as the company extended its holdings beyond Ontario into other regions of Canada and into the United States.

=== Loblaw Companies Limited ===
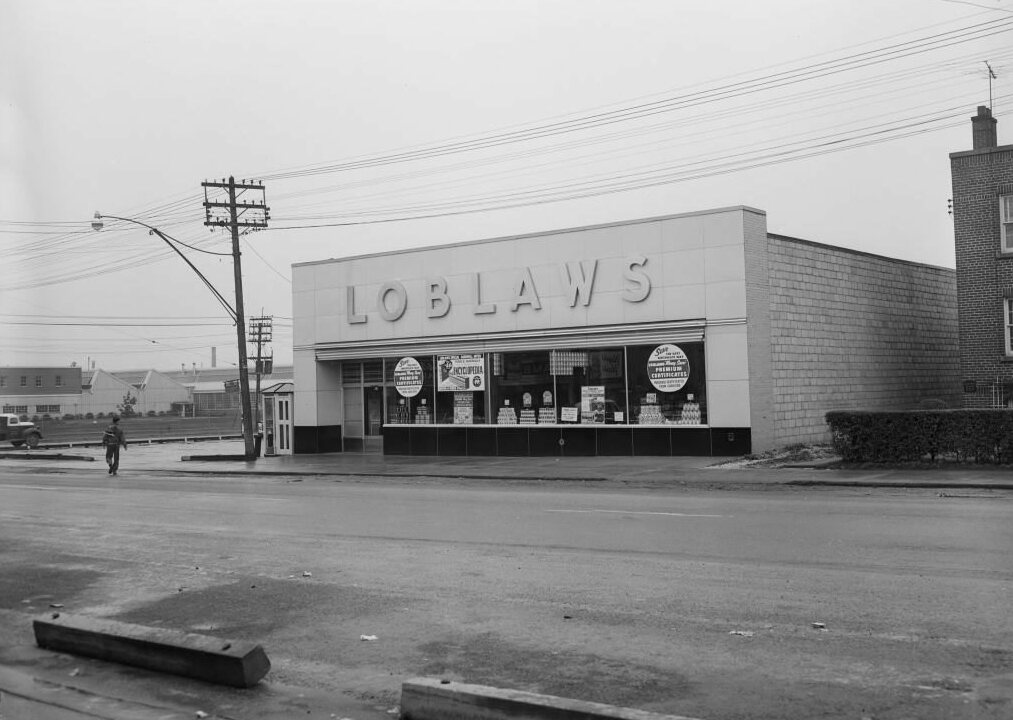
Loblaws store on Eglinton Avenue East, in Leaside, Toronto, 1956

In 1953, Loblaw Groceterias acquired majority control of Loblaw Inc., the former American branch of the company with stores in the State of New York, Pennsylvania, and Ohio, through a purchase of stock from George Weston Limited. That same year, Loblaw also bought the Power Supermarkets chain of Toronto. More noteworthy, though, was its decision to take a 25 per cent stake in Chicago-based National Tea Co., a major supermarket chain with some 750 stores in twelve states, three years later. With an ever-increasing array of retail assets, Loblaw Companies Limited was incorporated in 1956 as holding company for Loblaw Groceterias and the recently acquired holdings south of the border. That same year, Loblaw also announced a major new thrust into Western Canada with 32 supermarkets slated for construction. Other acquisitions followed, including Atlantic Wholesalers in the Maritimes with its associated retail outlets. At its height, Loblaw Companies Limited would represent the third largest grocery retailer in North America.

As large as Loblaw had grown, food retailing remained highly competitive and special promotions and customer loyalty programs were introduced as a way of attracting and retaining consumers. During the 1950s, car giveaways were a popular highlight of many grand openings of new Loblaws supermarkets. In 1959, the company entered the trading stamp wars with its own Lucky Green Stamps. Loblaw president George Metcalf brought store managers together for an early morning meeting in Toronto to make the surprise announcement, informing them that the stamps, redeemable for household gifts, had already been delivered to their stores. While at first quite popular, the program was finally concluded in 1967 as customers increasingly saw trading stamps as an expensive promotion that translated into higher prices at the checkout counter.

=== Stagnation ===
During the 1960s, while Loblaw set record sales, corporate profits declined. An era of aggressive expansion had paid off in terms of revenue growth but apparently at the expense of profitability. As shareholders complained about a lack of information from the company, frustrated analysts, unsure as to the corporate structure or holdings, became increasingly reluctant to recommend the stock. Loblaw annual meetings were better known for their distribution of cookies, cake and groceries than information on operating performance. While George Metcalf remained head of Loblaw Companies Limited, chairman W. Garfield Weston began making changes to senior executive ranks, including the appointment of Leon Weinstein, former head and son of the founders of Power Supermarkets, as president of Loblaw Groceterias Co. Limited from 1968 to 1970. Weinstein soon indicated his intent to "stop giving away baskets of groceries at annual shareholder meetings and try to raise dividends." To find out what Loblaws shoppers thought about the chain, Weinstein introduced a questionnaire on his personal letterhead, "asking customers to check-off their complaints," and received 65,000 replies, or three times the number expected.

In spite of attempts to get a handle on operational issues, Loblaws was still perceived as an "ailing supermarket chain." Meanwhile, pre-tax profits for Loblaw Companies Limited declined from CA$45.6 million in 1966 to $18.6 million in 1971, "and then vanished altogether." By the late 1960s, the company had begun selling assets. Between 1968 and 1974, Loblaw sold $164 million in holdings to corporate parent George Weston Limited in an apparent extension of "financial assistance." Yet Loblaw continued to make acquisitions. In 1969, it bought a controlling interest in Sayvette, a money-losing Toronto-based discount department store chain and went on to spend $8.7 million to acquire 100 percent ownership. But as competition heated up, losses mounted and stores were closed. The last Sayvette shut its doors in late 1977.

=== Reinventing Loblaws ===
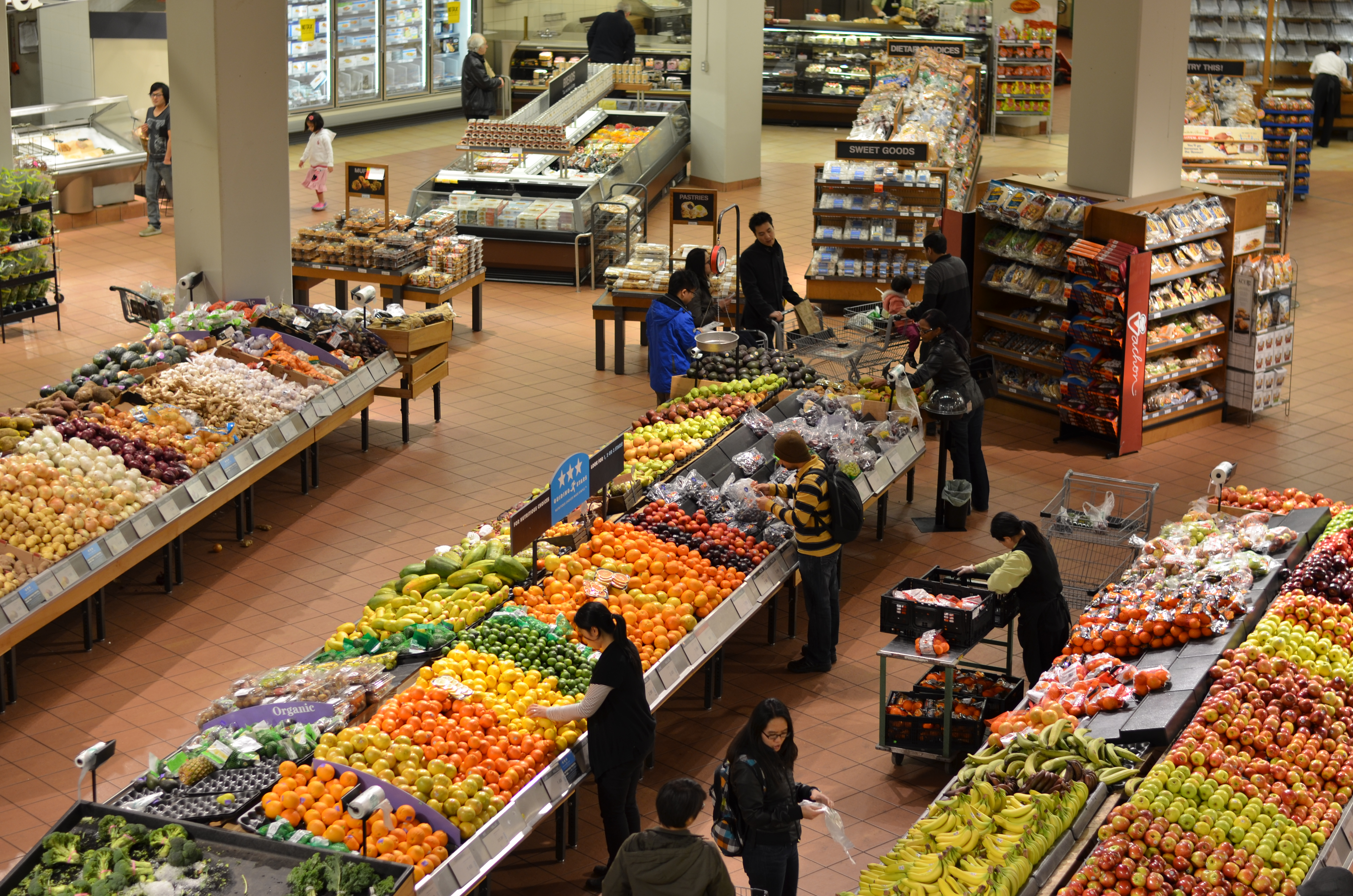
Consumers shopping at Loblaws

By the early 1970s, Loblaw was struggling under the weight of too much debt with millions of dollars of financial obligations coming due over the next few years. At the same time, its stores were badly in need of refurbishing and sales were in virtual free fall. Within a year, the company's share of the crucial Ontario market had been cut in half as a result of price wars among the major chains. South of the border, things looked somewhat better but only on the surface, with many of the company's supermarkets in large American inner cities in decline. A Canadian royal commission study years later noted "the company's failure to spend sufficient funds on the refurbishing of its existing supermarkets and the opening of new ones," in addition to a dividend policy that could not be justified on the basis of earnings. Loblaw also found itself constrained by various financial arrangements. In particular, so-called "lease and leaseback" agreements effectively prevented it from closing many of its smaller, money-losing outlets. To make matters worse, senior management was often reluctant or intransigent when it came to making operational changes. Faced with the possible bankruptcy of Loblaws, Garfield Weston asked his youngest son, W. Galen Weston, a successful entrepreneur and retailer in his own right, to take a close look at the chain to see if it could be saved. In February 1972, Galen Weston was appointed chief executive officer of Loblaw Companies Limited. With financing secured through a family holding company that freed Loblaw from its leaseback agreements, Weston began rationalizing operations, shutting down dozens of unprofitable stores while remodelling those that remained. "As a 200 store chain, we didn't look very good. As a 100 store chain, we looked very good indeed." In addition to dozens of store closures, warehouse operations were consolidated and new distribution centres built.

In 1973, Galen Weston brought in Toronto designer Don Watt. Known for his innovative product packaging and use of photography, Watt proposed a complete makeover of Loblaw's corporate image and retail space. Although Watt had little experience in supermarket design, Weston gave him the go ahead to remodel one of the stores. Weston reportedly told Watt that, "Loblaws is in such trouble that if it doesn’t work, it doesn't matter. If it works – good." On a budget of only $30,000, the renovations took place at night so the store could stay open during the day. Along with a complete redesign inside and out, that included new colours and a new repeating 'L' Loblaws logo, Watt made changes to traditional grocery store layout. He doubled the floor space of the produce department and moved it from the back of the store to the front. He also introduced new design elements such as moveable bins and huge photo enlargements of fresh fruits, vegetables and meats to graphically convey quality and freshness. Wood panelling covered over old walls and broken mirrors to give the interior a fresh, contemporary feel. Within the first few months of the remodelling, sales increased 60 percent.

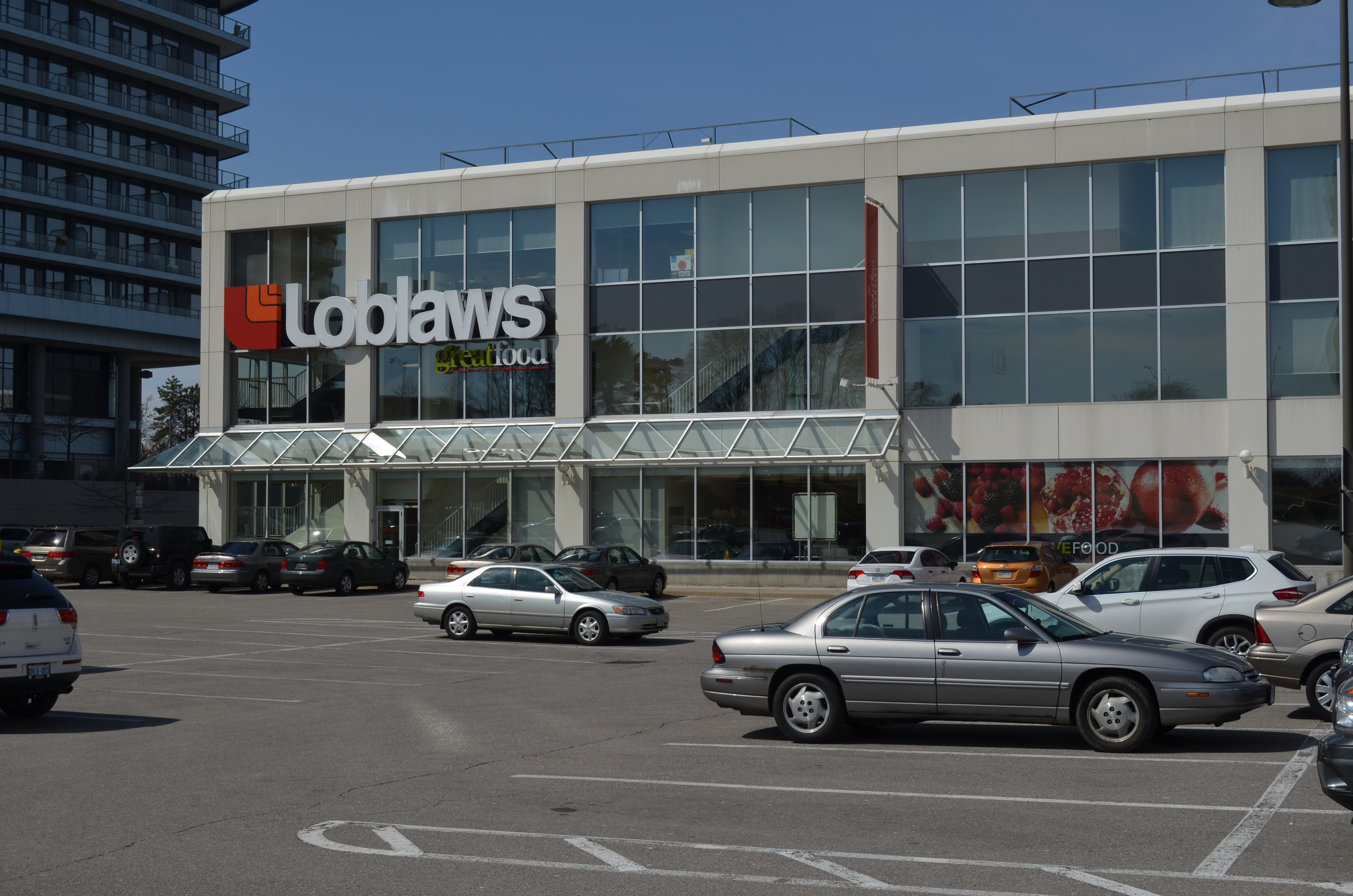
Loblaws location in Bayview Village, Toronto

Meanwhile, on the promotional side, a new advertising campaign was rolled out which featured Canadian actor William Shatner of Star Trek fame. TV viewers were told that, "More than the price is right...but by gosh, the price is right." Other changes involved the introduction of basic managerial techniques, such as profit and loss statements at the store level. But as the company slowly regained market share in Ontario, it began bleeding red ink when it came to its U.S. operations and in particular its National supermarket chain. The company initiated a similar program of rationalization and renewal which saw hundreds of stores closed and others remodelled. In 1976, Loblaw suspended the dividend on both its Class A and B shares as management cited "anticipated large extraordinary losses" by year’s end. The company also sold its Chicago Division of National supermarkets, purchased by A&P, after continued losses. In Canada, Nabob Foods Limited was also sold off. Meanwhile, parent George Weston Limited injected an additional $29 million into Loblaw through a purchase of treasury shares. By the end of the decade, through rationalization of both its retail stores and various businesses, Loblaw Companies Limited, as well as George Weston Limited, had returned to profitability. One Canadian business magazine described what W. Galen Weston and team had pulled off as a classic turnaround saga:

After 10 years of ruthless, painful reorganization, which involved divestitures, acquisitions and massive store closings, he and his team have transformed the Weston-Loblaw group into a lean, profitable, progressive, rational, superbly managed company – a winner and a world leader in what is still a perilous, savagely competitive business.

By 2019, the company's strategy to increase on-line sales of groceries was well established. (Loblaw stores were offering either delivery or customer pickup of orders placed on-line.) In spite of the limited sales in this category, about 10% of the market for all retailers, the company continued to move forward with the concept. "I see online being more relevant and more important to customers going forward. That’s why we’re focused on it", said Greg Ramier president of the market division at Loblaw Cos., in an interview by the Toronto Star.

=== No Name and No Frills ===
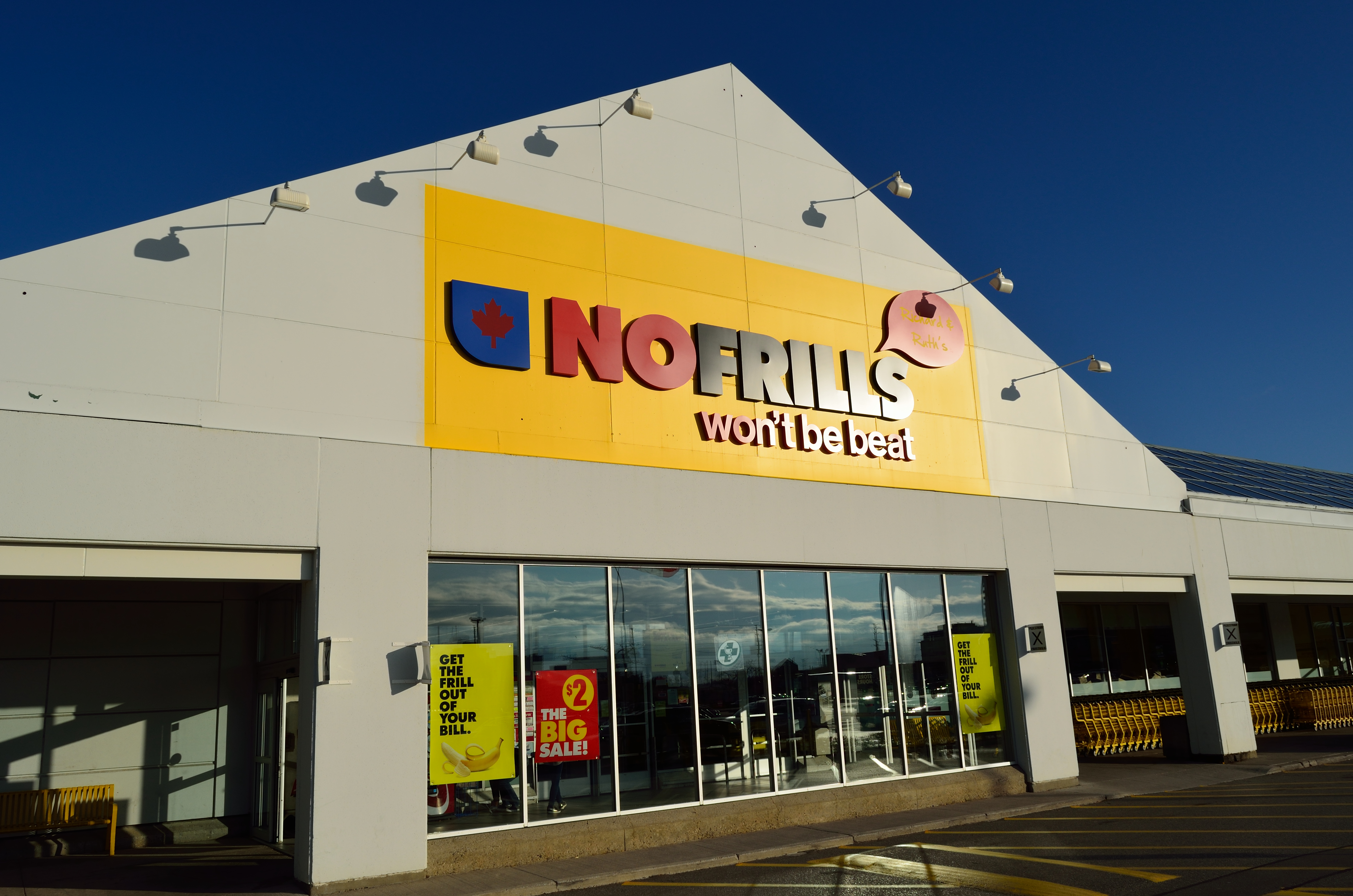
No Frills

Loblaw also moved to rejuvenate its own private label program by allocating millions of dollars to the development of in-store brands. In 1978, the company joined the "generics" movement with the introduction of 16 "No Name" items, marketed in simple black and yellow packaging. The new line was heavily promoted with advertised savings of between 10 and 40 percent. At a time of high inflation and consumer complaints about ever increasing food prices, No Name proved popular, with sales exceeding the company's own projections, as noted by Loblaws president Dave Nichol:

Since Loblaws introduced its 16 no-name products, it has sold one million units with many repeat purchases. "The suppliers of a number of these products can't keep up with the demand. In several cases, we've sold in two and a half weeks what we originally estimated would be our annual requirements.

When one competing food industry executive was critical of Nichol, noting the irony of heavily advertising No Name when generics typically went unadvertised to hold down costs, Nichol pointed out that Loblaw had not increased its promotional budget but simply redirected its advertising dollars towards the new line. A year later, the number of No Name products had increased to a hundred different items and represented five percent of Loblaws sales.

Within months of the No Name launch, Loblaw opened a prototype No Frills store in East York. Also known as a 'box store,' since items were not individually shelved but left in their cardboard shipping cartons, usually with the front cut away, the new store advertised "the lowest overall prices in Toronto." Though customers had to pack their own groceries, bring their own bags or pay three cents apiece, and contend with a limited selection of only 500 items, shoppers crowded the store on opening day. Customers gave up other standard conveniences, such as full-service meat or dairy departments, since refrigeration units had been removed to cut costs. In spite of the limited selection and minimal service, the first No Frills store proved a success and within months the company converted two more Loblaws locations to the new deep discount format.

=== President's Choice ===
While the original No Name line-up was promoted as basic, everyday items at considerable savings, Dave Nichol eventually began experimenting with the product line-up by adding more upscale items. Products such as Gourmet Barbecue Sauce, Escargot and imported jams began appearing in the familiar yellow and black generic packaging. When President’s Blend Gourmet Coffee was launched in time for Christmas 1983, it was soon outselling every other grocery item on Loblaws shelves. Nichol concluded that consumers wanted to go up-market and the decision was made to develop an entire line of upscale products under its own private label brand.

Modelled on the Marks & Spencer St. Michael in-house brand, and touted as being equal to or better in quality than competing national brands at less money, President’s Choice was personally endorsed by Nichol as president of Loblaw Supermarkets.

The introduction of the premium line also coincided with the advent of an advertising flyer entitled "Dave Nichol’s Insider’s Report." Based on a California supermarket flyer called "Trader Joe’s Insider’s Report," and referred to as "a mix of Mad magazine and Consumer Reports, zaniness and food tips, wrapped up in a comic book format," the insert proved popular with Ontario households. The flyer also became an important advertising vehicle for President’s Choice, which it came to exclusively promote. One of Nichol's early product development successes was President’s Choice The Decadent Chocolate Chip Cookie, which took over a year to develop. Nichol and his team insisted on the use of real butter and twice as much chocolate per cookie as the leading national brand. Although The Decadent was sold in only 17 percent of Canadian supermarkets, compared to 98 percent for Nabisco's Chips Ahoy!, "it fast became Canada's best selling cookie."

=== Superstore and Liquorstore ===
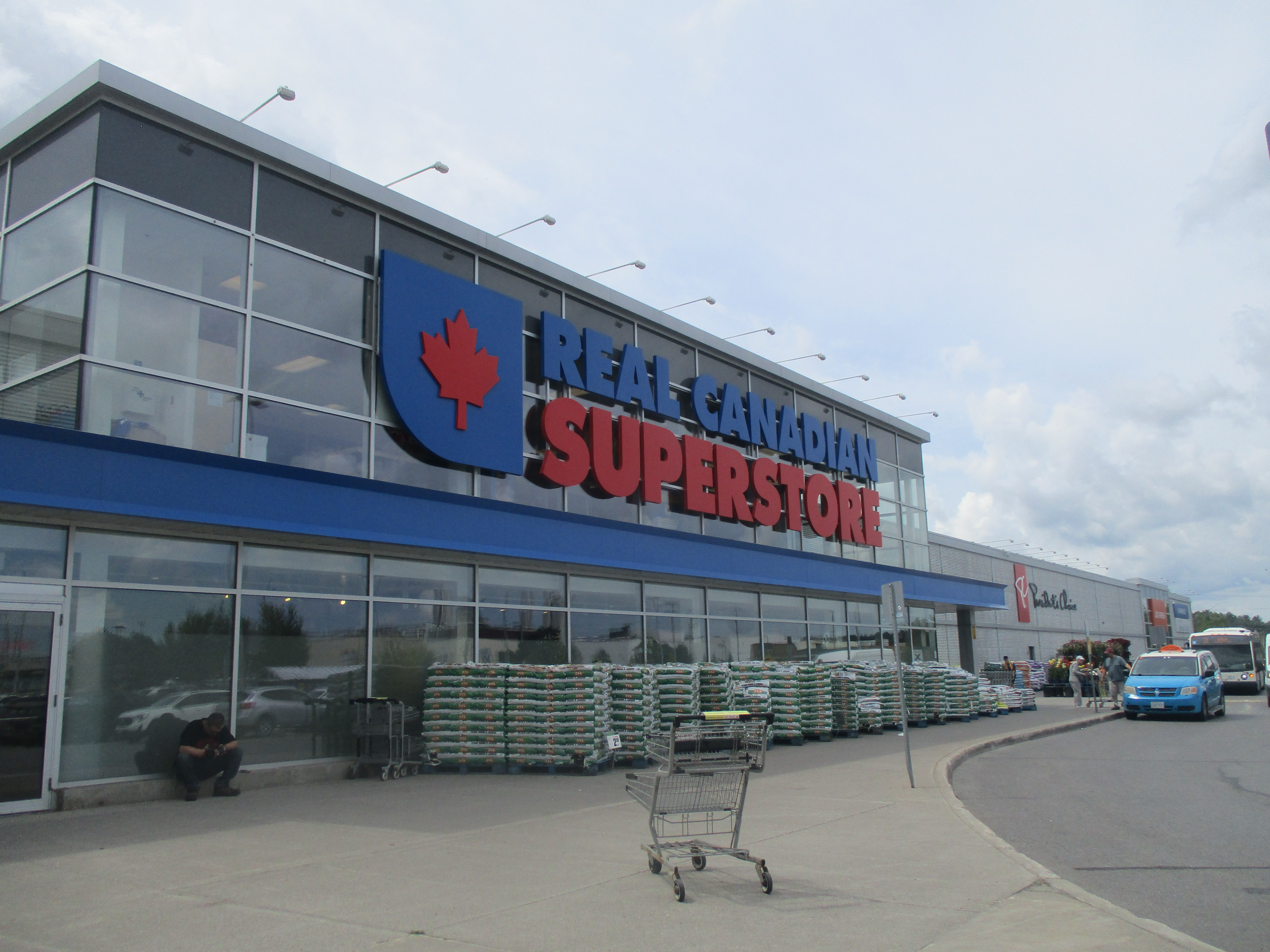
Real Canadian Superstore Lansdowne Place

The 1980s saw further innovation with regard to store formats. In Western Canada, Westfair Foods, a Loblaw subsidiary, unveiled its first "superstore" in Saskatoon, Saskatchewan, in 1979. Opened under the SuperValu banner, it was later renamed the Real Canadian Superstore. Modelled after the European hypermarket, the "combination store" included a large selection of general merchandise, along with a full supermarket component.

Touted as a "one-stop shopping" destination, the new superstore carried some 30,000 SKUs (stock-keeping units), which expanded to 40,000 over the next decade. The new format not only provided economies of scale and permitted lower retail prices, but also meant that management could build stores on its own terms, rather than be dependent on shopping mall construction. Sudbury, Ontario saw the first Superstore format in 1981 coinciding with the opening of the Sudbury Supermall.

In 1985, with nine Real Canadian Superstores across Western Canada, Loblaw tried to duplicate their success in Eastern Canada with the opening of its first combination store at Pickering, Ontario. Eventually, 13 superstores, four times the size of a conventional supermarket with about a third of the space devoted to general merchandise, were opened in Ontario and the Maritimes. Sales, however, lagged. By 1988, with corporate profits almost cut in half, the company downsized eight of the operations, in some cases changing store banners and leasing out the redundant space to other retailers. "Had Loblaw Companies not owned the real estate, the conversion and sub-leasing penalties might have proven prohibitive."

=== Expansion ===
By the mid-1980s, Loblaw Companies Limited had become Canada's largest supermarket retailer. Much of that success could be attributed to the effectiveness of the company's "control label" or private label program. In the case of President's Choice, a key management strategy had been to create a line of products available nowhere else but Loblaw stores.

The company also began extending the brand's market beyond Canada, making international inroads and in particular into the highly competitive American market. By the early 1990s, not only were PC products increasingly available at select U.S. regional supermarket chains, Loblaw was supplying retail giant Wal-Mart, marketing President's Choice products under the brand Sam's American Choice, later shortened to Sam's Choice, named after company founder Sam Walton. All indications were that Loblaw's control label program was starting to pay off south of the border:

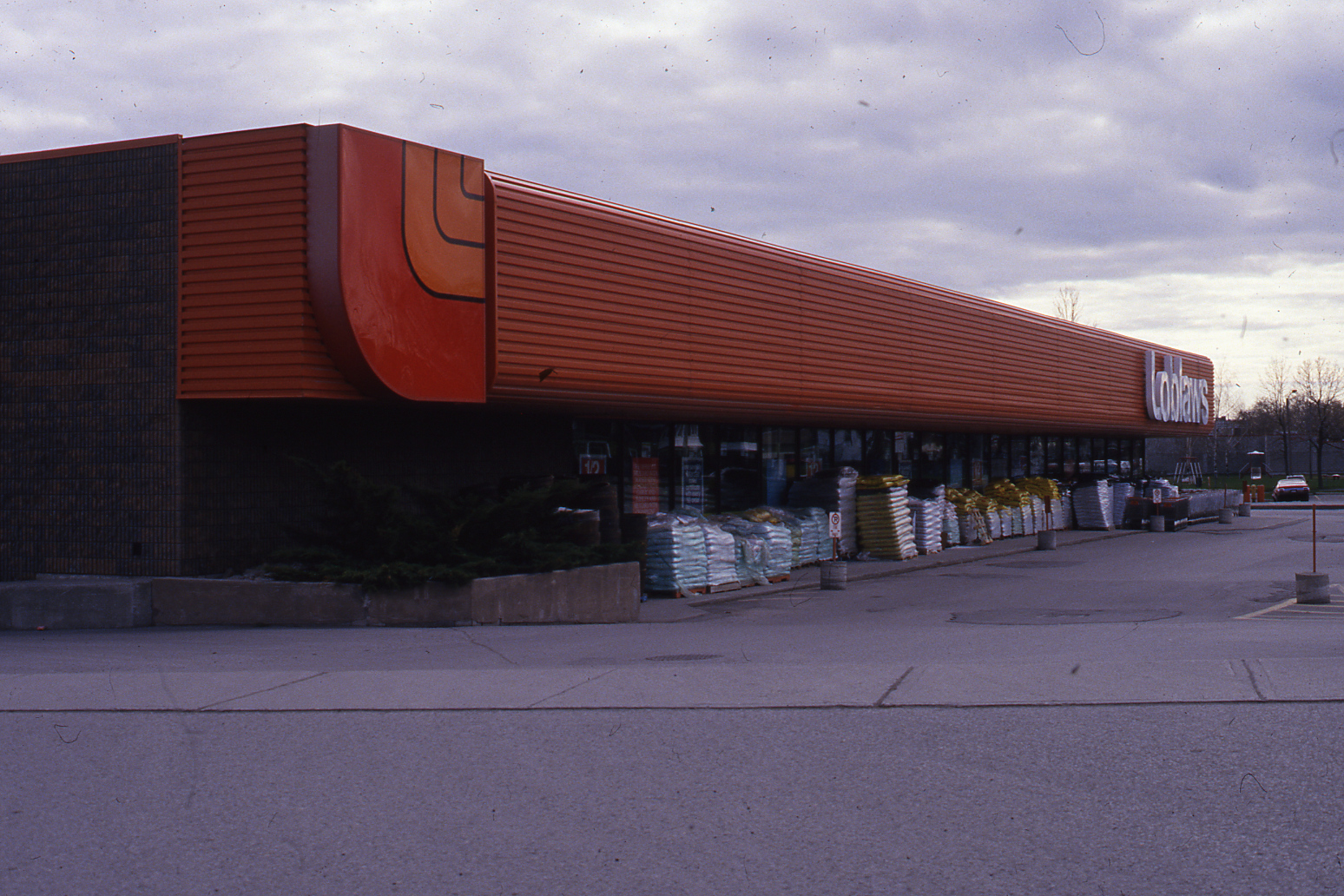
Loblaws Store in Belleville, 1987

President's Choice, the upscale private label at Loblaw's supermarkets, has been a resounding success in the United States – and has fired a rebellion of consumers and retailers against highly advertised, and therefore pricey, national brands. Its products have found their way into more than 1,200 stores in 34 states. The biggest deal is with Wal-Mart, which had $73 billion in sales in 1993. Dave Nichol, the man behind President's Choice, reports that Wal-Mart's volume on Sam's American Choice and Great Value lines, also developed by Loblaw's, was up 300 percent last year.

Meantime, though, Wal-Mart had announced what media reports likened to an "invasion of Canada," namely the acquisition of 120 Woolco stores across the country. Though Wal-mart was barred from selling the private-label line developed by Loblaw in Canada, the two retailers eventually parted company as they increasingly became competitors in the Canadian marketplace.

In November 1993, it was announced that Dave Nichol, who for the past decade had been so closely associated with President's Choice in terms of promotion and product development, was leaving his senior executive post to become a private label consultant. Initially, both he and Loblaw expressed the desire to continue working together, with Nichol remaining on in the role of PC spokesman. But as Nichol moved forward with plans to develop his own Dave Nichol brand of private label products with Cott Corporation of Toronto, presumably in competition with President's Choice, the relationship deteriorated. Nichol hosted a couple more issues of Dave Nichol's Insider's Report but then vanished from the cover. The November 1994 edition dropped his name to become simply The Insider's Report. While media coverage of the Nichol/Loblaw split had been extensive, it seemingly had little or no negative impact on brand equity. News reports later indicated that Loblaw, post-Nichol, was experiencing stronger-than-ever corporate earnings.

As Loblaw expanded operations in Canada under an array of regional and market segment store banners, by the mid-1990s it divested the last of its retail holdings south of the border with the sale of National supermarkets in St. Louis and New Orleans. At the time, Loblaw president Richard Currie reiterated the company's objective to move strategically, which included exiting markets if capital could be better deployed elsewhere. He further stated the company's intent to enter the Quebec market. In 1998, it did so with the purchase of Provigo, the Quebec-based supermarket chain with close to 250 outlets. In order to comply with Competition Bureau concerns, Loblaw sold 47 Loeb stores in Ontario, acquired through the Provigo deal, to Metro-Richelieu and agreed to divest stores in eight other markets. The Provigo acquisition meant that Loblaw had become the leading food retailer in Quebec, with Metro a close second. That same year, Loblaw also made another regional acquisition with the purchase of the 80-store Agora chain in Atlantic Canada. While other food chains, such as the Oshawa Group, struggled to turn a profit, Loblaw kept adding more stores and more square footage through acquisition and new construction:

Loblaw president Richard Currie laughs at the notion that Canada has too many grocery stores. There's a lot of floor space, he allows, but never enough in the large, modern, well-equipped, one-stop shopping supermarkets that some Canadians like. Loblaw keeps expanding its fleet of 900 stores, adding about 10 percent to its floor space and sales each year, while increasing its profit margin.

In 1998, Loblaw Companies Limited became the first Canadian food retailer to expand into banking with the launch of President's Choice Financial. Marketed as a simple, no-fee personal banking service located within grocery stores, PC Financial kiosks and automated teller machines were introduced in supermarkets across Canada. While Loblaw provided the brand and retail presence, banking services were delivered through a partnership with Canadian Imperial Bank of Commerce. At the same time, Loblaw introduced a loyalty initiative that allowed customers to earn points redeemable for free groceries, later formalized as PC Points. Within a year of its launch, more than 100 President’s Choice Financial kiosks and banking machines had been installed nationwide.

=== Management shakeup ===
After almost 25 years at the helm of Loblaw Companies Limited, Richard J. Currie retired as company president in November 2000. John Lederer, a veteran Loblaw executive, took over the top job. As president, Lederer moved forward with a number of strategic initiatives. Administrative functions were consolidated as a new corporate headquarters was unveiled in Brampton, Ontario. Warehouse operations were streamlined with the opening of new distribution centres as the company updated facilities and information technology. And, once again, Loblaw made an effort to offer more general merchandise in its stores in the hope of becoming more of a 'one-stop' shopping destination for consumers – all moves presumably designed to combat the threat posed by a "looming Wal-Mart incursion" as the retail giant announced the opening of more Supercentres in Canada. But as supply chain problems took root, customers began to complain of empty Loblaw shelves and out-of-stock items, while suppliers expressed their frustration coordinating deliveries to distribution centres. Unsold general merchandise began piling up in warehouses. Meantime, key staff, such as company buyers, had quit rather than relocate to the new corporate headquarters. Loblaw began losing money, quarter after quarter, and by the end of fiscal 2005, the company had recorded its first year-end loss in almost twenty years. In September 2006, John Lederer resigned as president of Loblaw Companies Limited and W. Galen Weston stepped down as chairman of the board. Weston's son, Galen G. Weston, was appointed executive chairman, while former Canadian Tire retail head Mark Foote became president and Allan Leighton, a prominent UK executive and longtime advisor to the senior Weston, took on the job of deputy chairman. Dalton Philips was later named Loblaw's chief operating officer. Reaction to the management shakeup was mixed, with Richard Currie critical of the move, saying it was unnecessary, while Dave Nichol expressed his personal frustration that it took five quarters of declining earnings before action was finally taken.

With the new management team in place, Loblaw completed a 100-day consultation in which senior executives met with store managers and employees to hear their concerns and complaints. Weston subsequently introduced a "simplify, innovate and grow" strategy designed to "fix the basics" by refocusing the company’s attention on food retailing. He also publicly declared that it would take at least three years to turn operations around as the company continued to work out kinks in its supply chain and upgrade computer systems. By the end of 2007, Loblaw had returned to profitability.

Since the departure of Dave Nichol a decade and a half before, Loblaw had been without a spokesman to pitch its brands and supermarkets. In 2007, in a major shift on the promotional side, executive chairman Galen Weston became the new public face of the company and in particular, its in-store private label products. With the 2008 financial crisis and recession, Loblaw began to heavily promote not only President's Choice but also its generic No Name products as an economical alternative to higher-priced national brands. In a television commercial reminiscent of Nichol from the 1980s, Weston presented two shopping carts, one filled with No Name items and the other with comparable national brands to show how consumers might save on their grocery bills.

On April 18, 2023, Loblaw announced that Galen Weston will be stepping back from the day-to-day activities as president and CEO. Per Bank, who has led Denmark's largest retailer, Sailing Group, for over a decade has been named the successor and will join the company in early 2024. Galen Weston will remain chairman of Loblaw and CEO of holding company George Weston Ltd.

In early 2024, new CEO Per Bank announced new changes to the company's divisional operating structure, including the newly created hard discount division, encompassing NOFRILLS and Maxi - with the Real Canadian Superstore banner joining the Market Division.

=== Joe Fresh ===
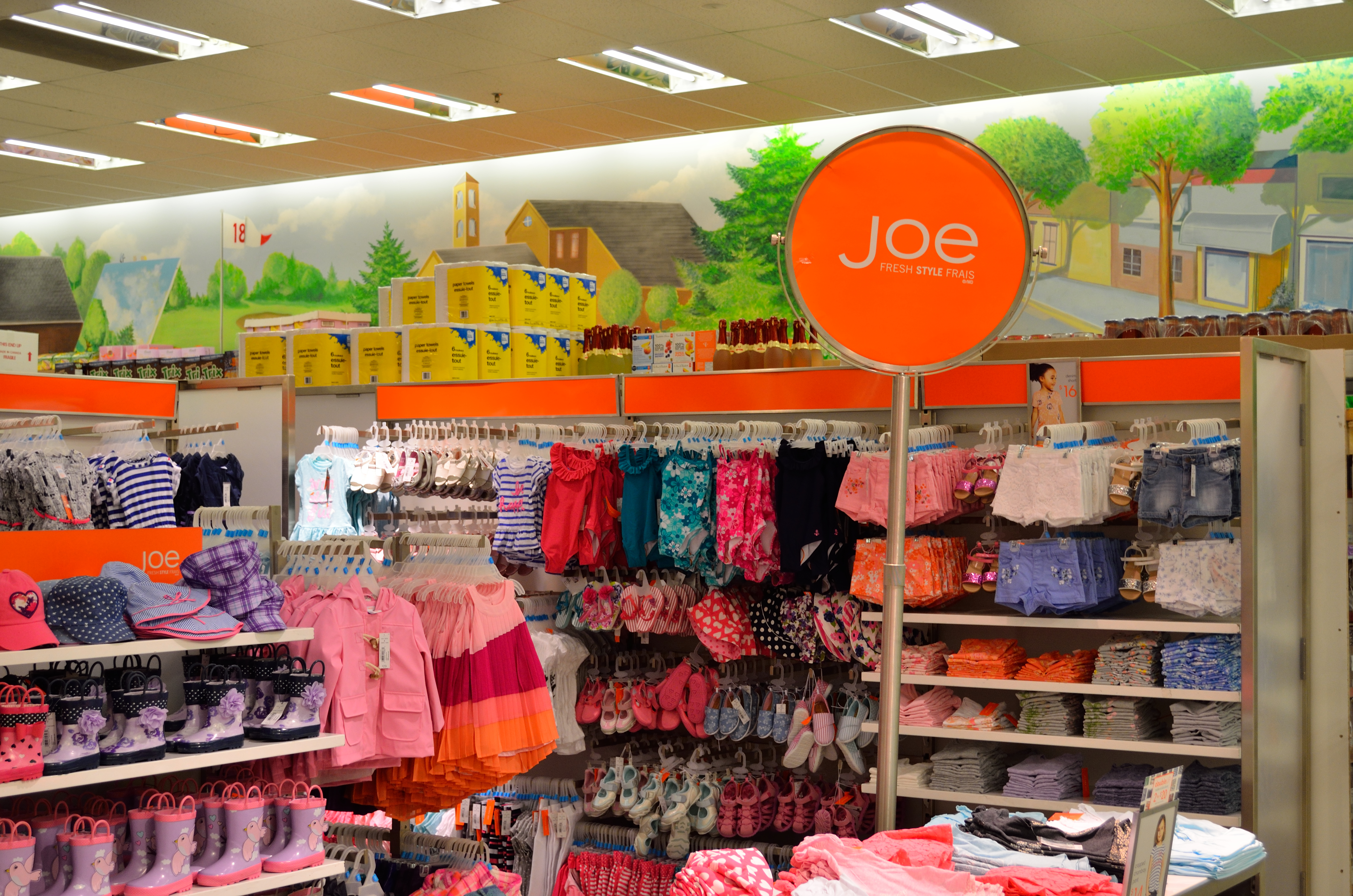
Inside a Joe Fresh store

In 2006, Loblaw and Canadian fashion designer Joe Mimran teamed up to launch "Joe Fresh" a line of low-cost clothing from contracted suppliers in Asia. Promoted as chic but highly affordable clothing, the new line is sold in supermarket and superstore aisles. Joe Fresh sales soon exceeded the company's own projections and Loblaw began expanding into children's wear, shoes, lingerie, beauty and bath products. In 2010, the first standalone store opened in Vancouver and Loblaw announced plans for 20 outlets across Canada.

Loblaw unveiled a number of Joe Fresh permanent and pop-up stores in New York City and the surrounding region in what one Loblaw executive described as "very much a pilot project." But Mimran, the former co-founder of Club Monaco, spoke less cautiously, envisioning 800 Joe Fresh stores across the United States within five years, with Asia and Europe the next logical international markets to take the brand.

=== Environment ===
Under Weston, Loblaw refocused its efforts in the area of corporate social responsibility, and in particularly on the environment, in issuing annual CSR reports. A line of more environmentally friendly GREEN products was launched (considered by many environmentalists and concerned consumers to be examples of greenwashing). Weston appeared in TV commercials to promote "Canada's greenest shopping bag," a reusable grocery bag made of 85 percent post-consumer recycled plastic, designed to reduce the number of disposable bags that ended up in landfill sites by one billion a year. Loblaw also unveiled one energy-efficient, low emissions environmental flagship store in Scarborough, Ontario, and became the first Canadian supermarket chain to install a wind turbine to supply renewable electricity to one of its stores.

In November 2008, Greenpeace alleged that Loblaw was selling 14 out of 15 fish species on that organization's "redlist" of those considered to be the most destructively farmed, and staged protests at some Toronto-area locations. The company denied the allegations, while the accuracy of the redlist itself has been challenged by U.S. government regulators and by the fish industry. Loblaw has since committed to sourcing all of its seafood from sustainable sources by 2013, and now features several Marine Stewardship Council-certified products under its President's Choice product line. Greenpeace's ratings of Loblaw's seafood initiatives have improved over the years and are now above all other national retailers (and second-highest of all retailers ranked), but were still classified as a failing grade in its 2010 report, based on an absence of labelling indicating where or how seafood is fished or farmed, and continued sale of some redlist species.

=== T&T and Black Label ===
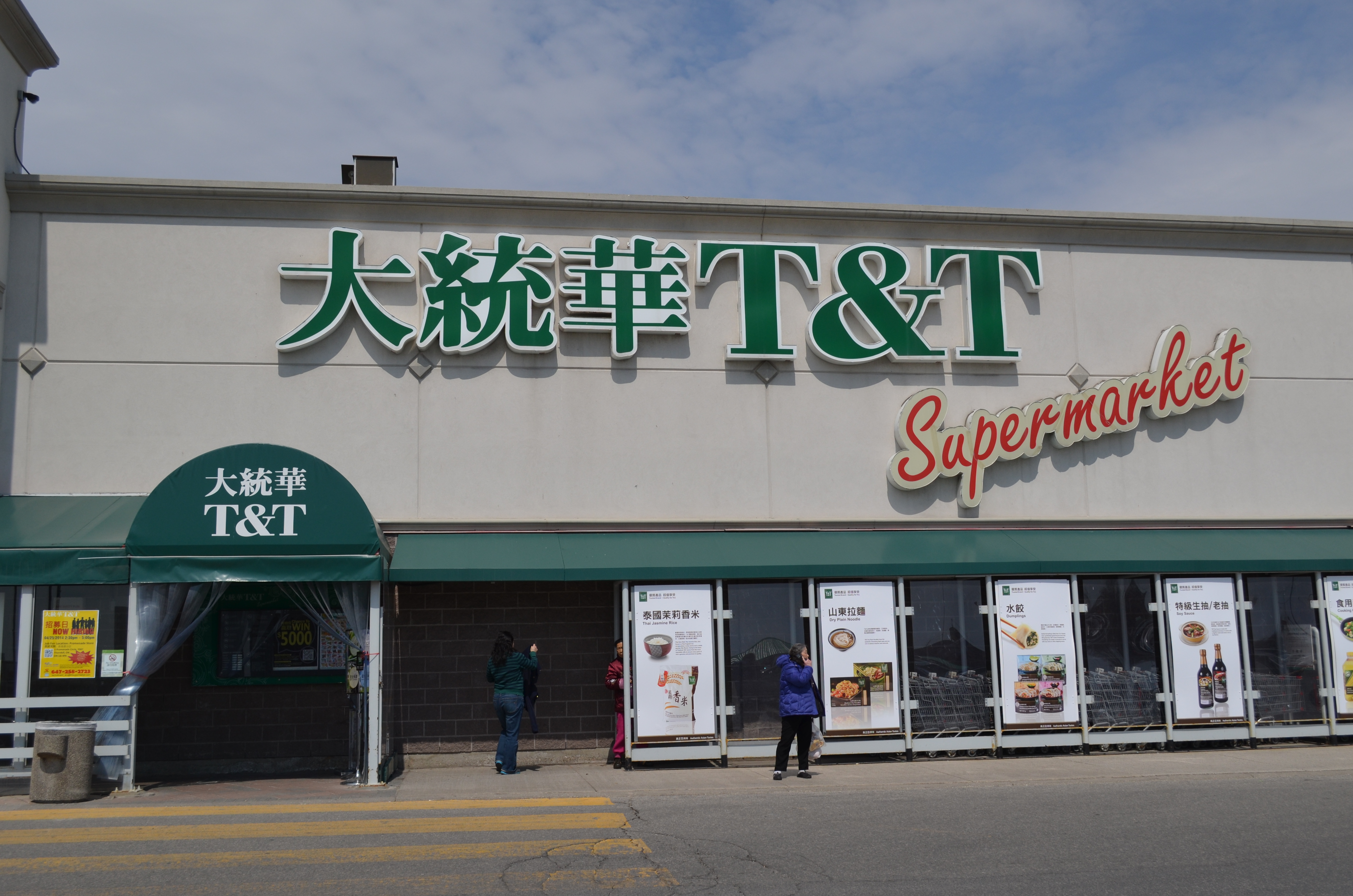
T & T Warden Store in Markham

In July 2009, Loblaw extended its presence in the ethnic retail market with its announced purchase of T&T Supermarket Inc., Canada's largest chain of Asian food stores, for some CA$225 million – 191 million in cash and the rest in preferred shares. Founded in 1993, the 17-store chain, with outlets in British Columbia, Alberta and Ontario, recorded more than $500 million in annual sales. T&T CEO Cindy Lee noted that some of the supermarket's customers already referred to it as the "Asian Loblaws."

Loblaw rented a Toronto avant garde art gallery as backdrop to the launch of its new "Black Label" line of gourmet food products. The luxury grocery items, marketed under the President's Choice brand, were showcased via a celebrity chef by-invitation-only dinner party. Promoted as "affordable indulgences," the products range in price from $1.99 to $24.99. "From the smoky bacon marmalade, to the crumbly eight year old cheddar, to the cherry shiraz fruit jelly," the eclectic line-up is designed to compete with specialty stores. Though dubbed "PC Black Label," the brand name does not actually appear on any of the items, with its largely black and white packaging and photography the primary clue to the product line's identity:

"It goes back to our first successful controlled brand product in a yellow and black package with No Name on it. It wasn’t until six years later that we actually put "No Name" on the packaging," Ian Gordon, vice president at Loblaw Brands Limited, explained.

Loblaw has published its own book of recipes. "The Epicurean's Companion" lists an eclectic assortment of dishes prepared using Black Label products including Cheddar Bacon Marmalade Toast and Porcini Glazed Mushrooms with Pancetta.

=== Maple Leaf Gardens ===
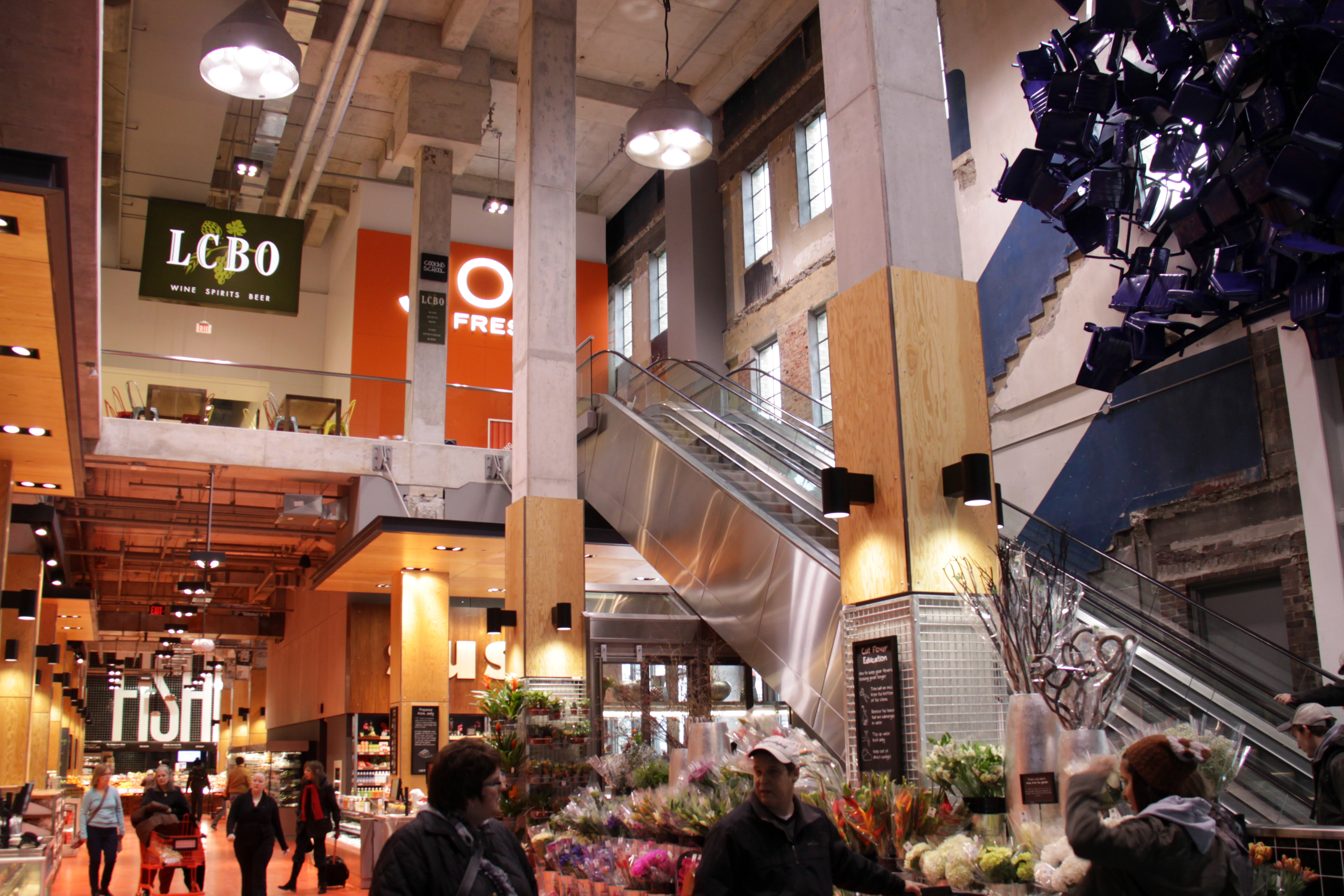
Loblaws at Maple Leaf Gardens

In 2004, Loblaw Companies purchased Maple Leaf Gardens, a former hockey arena in Toronto. In 2009, the company announced a CA$60 million project, in which it would partner with Ryerson University to construct a flagship Loblaws store at its ground level, as well as a multi-purpose athletics complex (the Mattamy Athletic Centre) for Ryerson in its upper levels, featuring volleyball and basketball courts, and a full-sized hockey rink. These plans had been delayed due to financial concerns, criticism over the purchase by residents, and conditions imposed by MLSE forbidding the purchaser from unduly using the building as a competing sports venue.

The location, Loblaws at Maple Leaf Gardens, opened on November 30, 2011; the 7,900-square-metre (85,000 sq ft) store features many historical and architectural features of the old Gardens, including the spot where centre ice once stood. It also features artwork honouring notable events and concerts held at the arena, including murals and a blue maple leaf sculpture (in honour of the Toronto Maple Leafs) constructed from its seating. The store also includes an LCBO location, and a Joe Fresh store. Loblaw executive chairman Galen Weston explained that the store was designed to "[reimagine] the urban supermarket".

=== Choice Properties ===
In December 2012, Loblaw announced that it would spin off most of its real estate properties into a new publicly listed real estate investment trust. The move would allow Loblaw to monetize the value of its real estate holdings, invest in its grocery business, by reducing taxes through tax advantages of the REIT structure. Loblaw shares increased 24% on the news. On July 5, 2013, the new REIT, Choice Properties REIT, held a CA$400 million IPO. Loblaw retained majority ownership in the new company.

In February 2018, Choice announced that it would acquire Canadian Real Estate Investment Trust (CREIT), a diversified commercial REIT, for CA$3.9 billion.

=== Shoppers Drug Mart and Pharmaprix ===
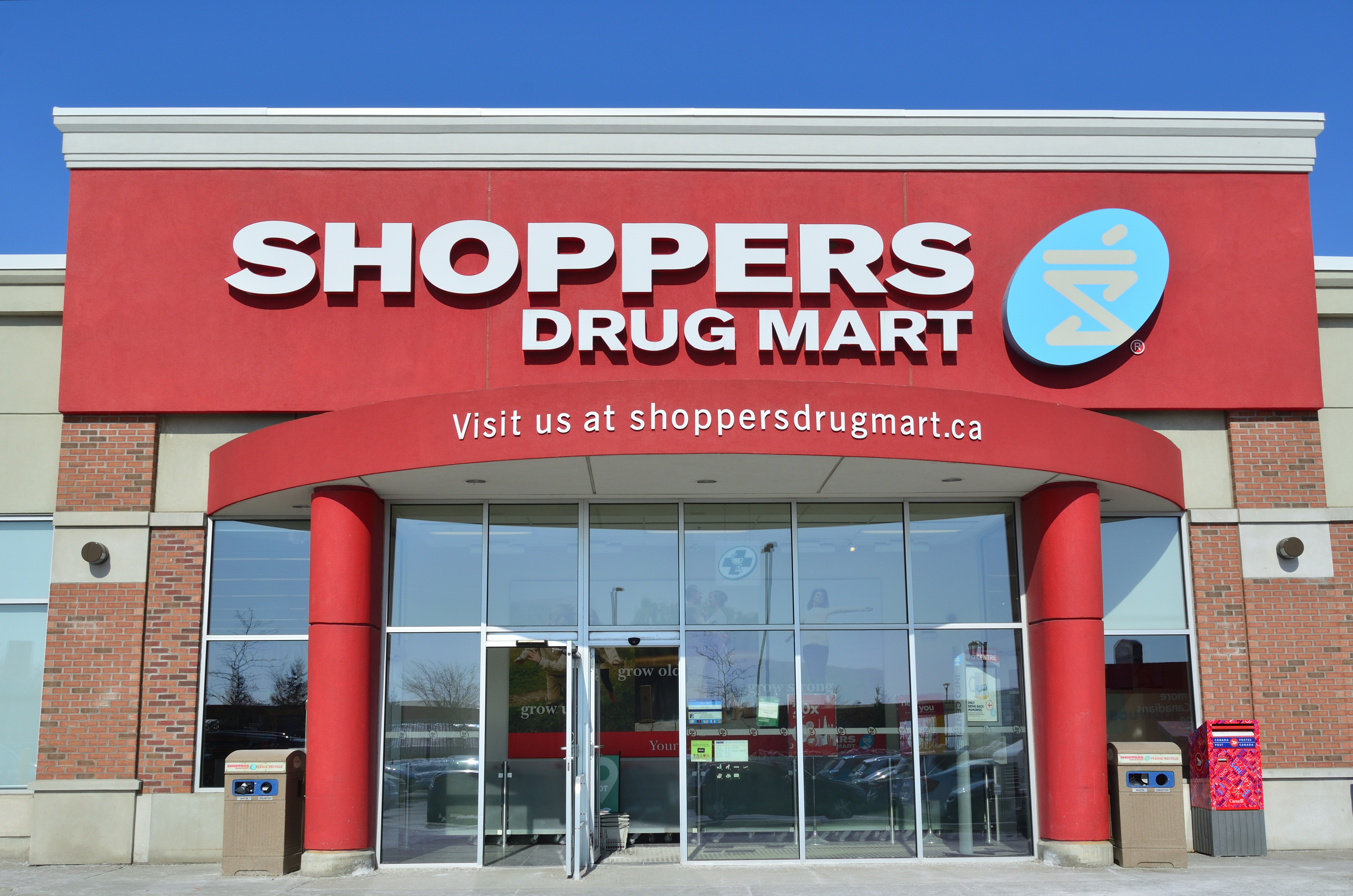
Shoppers Drug Mart

On July 15, 2013, Loblaw announced that it would acquire Canada's largest pharmacy chain, Shoppers Drug Mart (branded "Pharmaprix" in the Province of Quebec), for CA$12.4 billion in a cash and stock deal. Galen G. Weston indicated the possibility for store brands from the two chains to appear in each other's stores following the merger, and that the merger would give Loblaw greater buying power for health and wellness products. The merger received approval by both shareholders and the Competition Bureau, allowing Loblaw to close the deal on March 28, 2014. Shoppers Drug Mart and its administration will continue to work as a separate operating division of Loblaw Companies Limited.

Following the purchase, the Shoppers Drug Mart loyalty program Optimum was merged with Loblaw's PC Plus program to form PC Optimum.

== Banners ==
Loblaw operates under many banners throughout Canada, so as to appeal to different niches but also to present the illusion of greater competition. While most of these banners are not likely to be abandoned in the near future, during much of the 2000s, the company focused on developing the large-format Real Canadian Superstore banner, which is gradually replacing some Loblaws and Zehrs locations in Ontario, as a national rival to Walmart Canada.

Additionally, as part of a 2006 agreement with unionized employees in Ontario, Loblaw announced that it would introduce a new food-centred supermarket format (originally called the "Great Canadian Food Store") for locations not converted to the Superstore format. This format has since opened under the name "Loblaw Great Food". In total, 44 existing Ontario stores were planned to be converted to either the Superstore or Great Food format between 2006 and 2010, in addition to new construction and existing Superstores.

The banners are listed below based primarily on their 2006 format classifications within Loblaw, though some individual locations may not match the specified format.

=== Superstore ===
- Dominion Stores (Newfoundland)
- Maxi / Maxi & Cie (Quebec)
- Real Atlantic Superstore (The Maritimes)
- Real Canadian Superstore (Ontario, Western Canada, and Yukon)

=== "Great Food" ===
- Loblaws / Loblaw Great Food / Loblaws CityMarket (Alberta, British Columbia and Southern Ontario)
- Provigo / Provigo Le Marché (Quebec; some franchised)
- T & T Supermarket (British Columbia (Greater Vancouver), Alberta (Calgary, Edmonton), Quebec (Montreal) and Ontario (Greater Toronto Area, Ottawa)
- Zehrs / Zehrs Great Food (Southwestern Ontario, South Central Ontario, Central Ontario)

=== Primarily franchised ===
- Fortinos (Hamilton, Toronto and suburban Golden Horseshoe)
- SuperValu (Western Canada)
- Shop Easy Foods (Western Canada)
- Lucky Dollar Foods (Western Canada)
- Red & White Food Stores (Atlantic Canada)
- Valu-mart (Ontario)
- Freshmart (Ontario, Nova Scotia)
- L’Intermarché (Quebec)
- Your Independent Grocer / Independent CityMarket / (Atlantic Canada, Alberta, British Columbia, Northwest Territories, Ontario, Saskatchewan, and Yukon)

=== Hard discount ===
- Maxi / Maxi & Cie (Quebec)
- No Frills / no name store (National except Quebec and the Territories; franchised)

=== Wholesale / Cash and carry ===
- Atlantic Cash & Carry (Atlantic Canada)
- Entrepôts Presto (Quebec)
- Club Entrepôt (Quebec – formerly Club Entrepôt Provigo)
- NG Cash & Carry (Ontario) – took on the old National Grocers Co. Ltd banner
- Wholesale Club (Ontario, Western Canada and Nova Scotia)

=== Liquor ===
- Real Canadian Liquorstore (Alberta, Saskatchewan)
- Your Independent Liquorstore

=== Defunct banners ===
- Atlantic SuperValu (Atlantic Canada) – operated by Loblaw's Atlantic Wholesalers in the 1990s and became Atlantic Superstore
- Bells Markets (Western New York)
- Better Foods Markets (Los Angeles)
- Busy-B (Ontario)
- Econo-Mart (Western Canada)
- Extra Foods (Western Canada and Ontario; some franchised)
- Gordon's (Ontario)
- Louis Stores (Oakland, California)
- National (St. Louis and New Orleans, United States) - Sold to Schnucks in 1995
- OK Economy (Western Canada, Ontario)
- Mr. Grocer (Ontario) – rebranded Dominion stores and sold by A&P Canada to National Grocers; name later phased out
- Power (Ontario) – began as one store in Toronto in 1904 by Samuel and Sarah Weinstein and sold to Loblaws in 1953 and re-branded in 1972;
- SaveEasy (Atlantic Canada) - rebranded as Your Independent Grocer
- Super Centre (Southern and Southwestern Ontario) – stores converted to other Loblaw's brands and some sold off
- IGA (supermarkets) (Atlantic Canada) rebranded as other Loblaws banners

=== In-store brands ===
Loblaw has a number of common products and services at many of its stores regardless of banner. These include:

- President's Choice, no name and T&T private label products
- DRUGStore Pharmacy and Loblaw Pharmacy.
- "Upstairs at (store name)", a community room / cooking school. The cooking school offers kids, adults and teen cooking classes. As well, community room space is available for rent, and completely organized cooking birthday parties are available for children ages 5–16.
- Joe Fresh, a clothing line, accessories. Joe Fresh cosmetics have now been rebranded to Quo (which is also a Shoppers Drug Mart brand.)
- President's Choice Financial, an issuer of Mastercard credit cards.
- PC Optimum, a rewards program designed to give points on online offers, through the PC Optimum app, and in-store offers.
- PC Express, an online click and collect program available at certain Loblaw banner stores.
- J± (stationery, batteries)
- Jogi (sports accessories)
- Jet Set Go (travel accessories)
- Life (over-the-counter pharmacy items), the Exact brand is discontinued.
- Life (over-the-counter medicinal accessories)
- The Mobile Shop (Mobile Phone and service kiosk, sold to and run by Glentel)
- Teddy's Choice (children's items)
- Theodore & Pringle (optometrists) (Closing and Conversion of 111 locations to Specsavers by the end of 2025)

=== Petroleum ===
Loblaw used to operate gas stations co-located with 213 of its stores, under brands such as Gas Bar, At The Pumps, À pleins gaz, and Refuel. In 2017, Loblaw announced that it had sold these operations to Brookfield Business Partners for $540 million. The stations were subsequently rebranded as Mobil.

== Corporate governance ==
The current members of the Board of Directors of Loblaw Companies Limited are: Galen Weston Jr. (Executive Chairman), Stephen E. Bachand, Paul M. Beeston, Gordon A. M. Currie, Anthony S. Fell, Christiane Germain, Anthony R. Graham, John S. Lacey, Nancy H. O. Lockhart, Thomas C. O'Neil, and John D. Wetmore.

== Controversies ==
In April 2019, it was reported that Prime Minister Justin Trudeau gave Loblaws a federal grant of $12 million Canadian dollars for new refrigeration units in their stores in order to agree to spending $36 million on upgrading their refrigerators to a more environmentally friendly model. Both Trudeau and the Canadian Environment Minister Catherine McKenna in April 2019 were criticized for allowing $12 million taxpayer dollars to go to the second richest family in Canada for new refrigerator installations. Joanne Dobson, and Meredith Logan, two of Loblaws top lobbyists, donated thousands of dollars to the Liberal Party of Canada, and hosted fundraising events for the Liberals and Trudeau family.

In January 2018, Loblaws was implicated in price-fixing the cost of bread in Canada, taking part from 2001 until 2015. The company admitted its involvement in the scheme. In response to the price-fixing, in January 2018, all consumers were offered the chance to receive a $25 gift card for bread. Previously, the company had estimated between 3 and 5 million Canadians would sign up. There was some criticism for the Loblaws policy of requiring an ID for the gift cards, which was investigated by the privacy commissioner of Canada and resulted in protests. Loblaws and George Weston Limited agreed to pay $500 million to settle the lawsuit in July 2024, with the class action lawsuit against several other retailers continuing.

Also in 2018, Loblaws was ordered to pay back taxes of $368 million in relation to a banking subsidiary in the Caribbean. It involved a Loblaws Inc. subsidiary in Barbados that had been renamed Glenhuron Bank. Loblaws had net earnings of around $800 million in 2018, and profits of $3 billion.

In August 2019, the Supreme Court of Canada decided that Loblaws could not be held responsible for the Rana Plaza textile factory disaster which killed 1,130 people and seriously injured 2,520 others in Dhaka, Bangladesh. At the time, the garment factory was under an arm's length contract to manufacture items for Loblaws' Joe Fresh brand.

In January 2020, it was reported that 800 employees were being laid off in Quebec and Ontario in 2021 when Loblaws switched to automated distribution at two of its major facilities. In May 2020, the franchise stated it would re-open service counters in the near future, after being closed for the COVID-19 pandemic. The company hiked employee pay in March 2020 for the coronavirus pandemic, upping wages by $2 per hour. The union Unifor criticized Loblaws for removing the pandemic pay bump in June 2020. Despite revenue growth, in July 2020, Loblaws reported that profits were down due to expenditures related to the pandemic. Starting September 1, 2020, it was announced that Loblaws and its associated company Shoppers Drug Mart were offering asymptomatic testing for COVID-19 at all their pharmacies.

In March 2023, Galen Weston Jr. along with the CEOs of Metro Inc. and Empire Co. was summoned to testify before a House of Commons committee as part of an ongoing study on food price inflation. He informed lawmakers that the grocery chain earned $2.66 billion Canadian dollars before taxes in the previous year, at a pre-tax margin of 4.7%; up slightly from 4.6% a year earlier. Lawmakers were told that the higher margins came from pharmacy, cosmetic and apparel sales, while overall sales have benefitted from consumers shifting spending away from restaurants toward groceries.

In January 2025, a CBC News investigation found that Loblaws had illegally sold underweighed meat by including the weight of packaging in 80 stores for an unknown period before ending the practice in December 2023. The Canadian Food Inspection Agency alerted Loblaws and did not issue a fine because the practice was ended. CBC News found that underweighing still occurred at two Loblaws-operated stores in late 2024.

In March, 2026 the company said it was investigating a data breach.

=== May 2024 boycott ===
On May 1, 2024, Canadian shoppers began a boycott against Loblaw along with its companies and supermarkets. Organized by Reddit community r/loblawsisoutofcontrol, which was created by Milton, Ontario, mental health worker Emily Johnson in late 2023, the boycott was organized amidst accusations against Loblaw of engaging in corporate greed practices such as greedflation and price gouging, due to the corporation recording major profits whilst heavily increasing their grocery prices. A Dalhousie University study in late 2022 for example found that Loblaw, along with Canada's two other largest grocers, Metro and Sobeys, had all reported yearly profits that were "above average" compared to their five-year averages. Critics argued that these companies were "profiteering at a time when food prices are rising at the fastest rate in more than 40 years." The study highlighted Loblaw's profits for outperforming both their past-five-year average and individual year performances.

The boycott encouraged Canadian consumers to seek locally owned alternatives to Loblaws-owned grocery stores, such as small businesses. The aim of the boycott was to pressure Loblaw into making a 15% reduction on their grocery prices, and signing Canada's Grocery Code of Conduct, a proposed process created by Agriculture and Food ministers throughout Canada to “address the concerns of processors, producers and independent grocers regarding increased retailer fees on suppliers and the need for balance in the supplier-retailer relationship, while also ensuring that Canadians continue to have access to a reliable food supply at affordable prices.” Loblaw, as well as Walmart, have both previously refused to sign onto the code of conduct.

On the same day marking the start of the boycott, Loblaw reported CA$459 million in profits out of CA$13.58 billion in revenue during the first quarter of 2024, a 9.8% increase in profits and a 4.5 percent increase in revenue from last year. Around the beginning of the boycott, Loblaw made attempts to contact those involved with organizing it. On May 3, 2024, Johnson had a meeting with Per Bank, the CEO and president of Loblaw, sharing "shoppers' concerns and questions" with him. The boycott calls additionally caught the attention of Loblaw Chairman Galen Weston Jr., who considered it to be "misguided criticism" and added that given their significance in Canada's grocery market, "it is natural that Loblaw would be singled out as a focal point for media and government and of course consumer frustrations.” Weston denied Loblaw's alleged responsibility in the rising costs of groceries, adding that "inflation is a global issue and is not specific to our company or to our industry." According to a poll conducted between May 17 and 19, 58% of Canadians supported the boycott, and 18% of Canadians or members of their household were participating in it.

== See also ==
- List of supermarket chains in Canada
