= Fortinos =

Canadian supermarket chain, a subsidiary of the Loblaw Companies

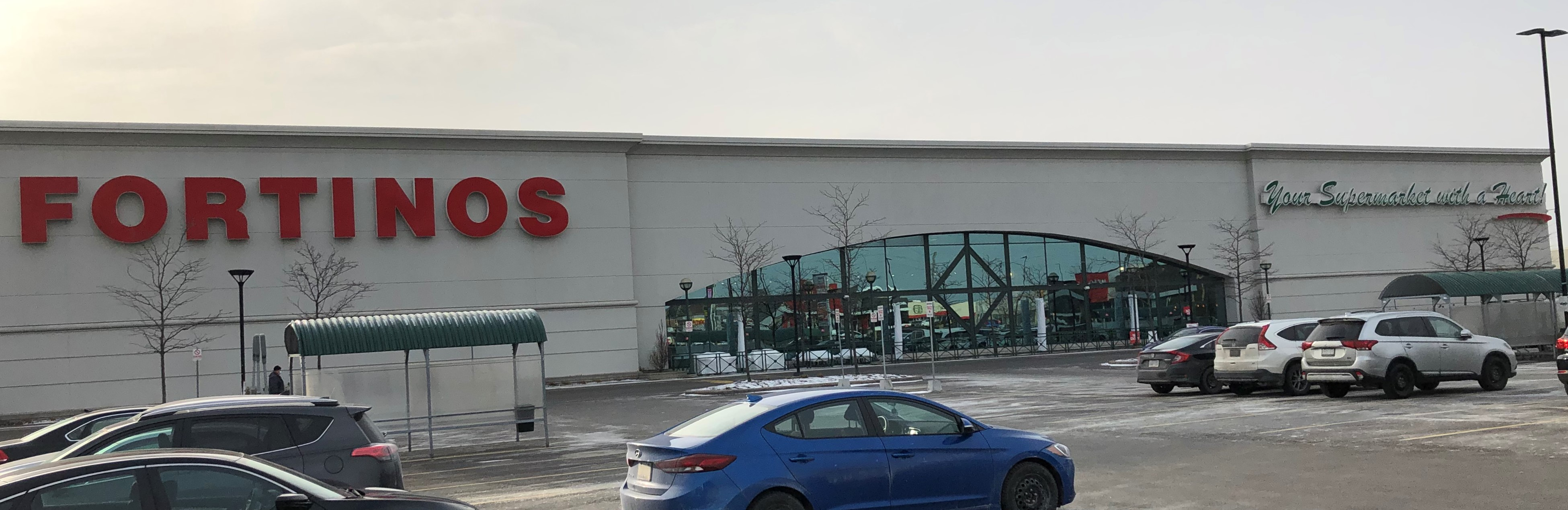
- A Fortinos location in Vaughan, Ontario
- Type: Subsidiary
- Industry: Retail; Supermarket
- Founded: 1961; 65 years ago, in Hamilton, Ontario, Canada
- Founder: John Fortino
- Headquarters: Hamilton, Ontario, Canada
- Number of locations: 24 (2024)
- Area served: Greater Toronto and Hamilton Area
- Products: Bakery, dairy, delicatessen, frozen foods, general grocery, meat and poultry, produce, seafood, snacks, pharmacy, flowers
- Brands: No Name; President's Choice
- Parent: Loblaw Companies
- Website: fortinos.ca

Fortinos is a Canadian supermarket chain that was founded in Hamilton, Ontario. It operates 24 stores across the western Greater Toronto and Hamilton Area. It is owned by Loblaw Companies Limited.

== History ==
In 1961, Giovanni (John) Fortino, a steelworker and immigrant from Cosenza, Calabria, Italy, opened his first Fortinos store in lower Hamilton, Ontario, at King St. E. and Glendale Ave. In 1972, Fortino took on seven partners and opened a second store on Hamilton Mountain. Owing to their growing success, subsequent stores were opened in Hamilton, Burlington and Brampton.

Fortinos provides a European-style "townsquare" shopping concept in which the store is arranged like a European street with a Bakeshoppe, cheese shoppe, Butcher, Flower Shoppe, etc. The stores also feature cafes serving hot coffee, baked goods, and fresh- made-to-order wraps and soups. Fortino's slogan is "Your Supermarket with a Heart".

Fortinos became a part of Loblaw Companies Limited in 1988, but did not carry the parent company's No Name brand products. During the 1990s, Fortinos focused on the Greater Toronto and Hamilton, opening stores in Toronto (North York and Etobicoke) and Vaughan.

Fortino died of cancer on May 18, 2011, at the age of 76. In 2012, a memorial to him was erected at the Mall Road store in Hamilton.

== See also ==
- List of supermarket chains in Canada
