= Your Independent Grocer =

Canadian supermarket chain, a subsidiary of the Loblaw Companies

- Company type: Supermarket
- Industry: Retail
- Founded: 1992; 34 years ago
- Headquarters: Brampton, Ontario
- Products: Bakery, dairy, deli, frozen foods, gardening centre, general grocery, general merchandise, meat & poultry, pharmacy, Photolab, produce, seafood, snacks
- Parent: Loblaw Companies
- Website: www.yourindependentgrocer.ca

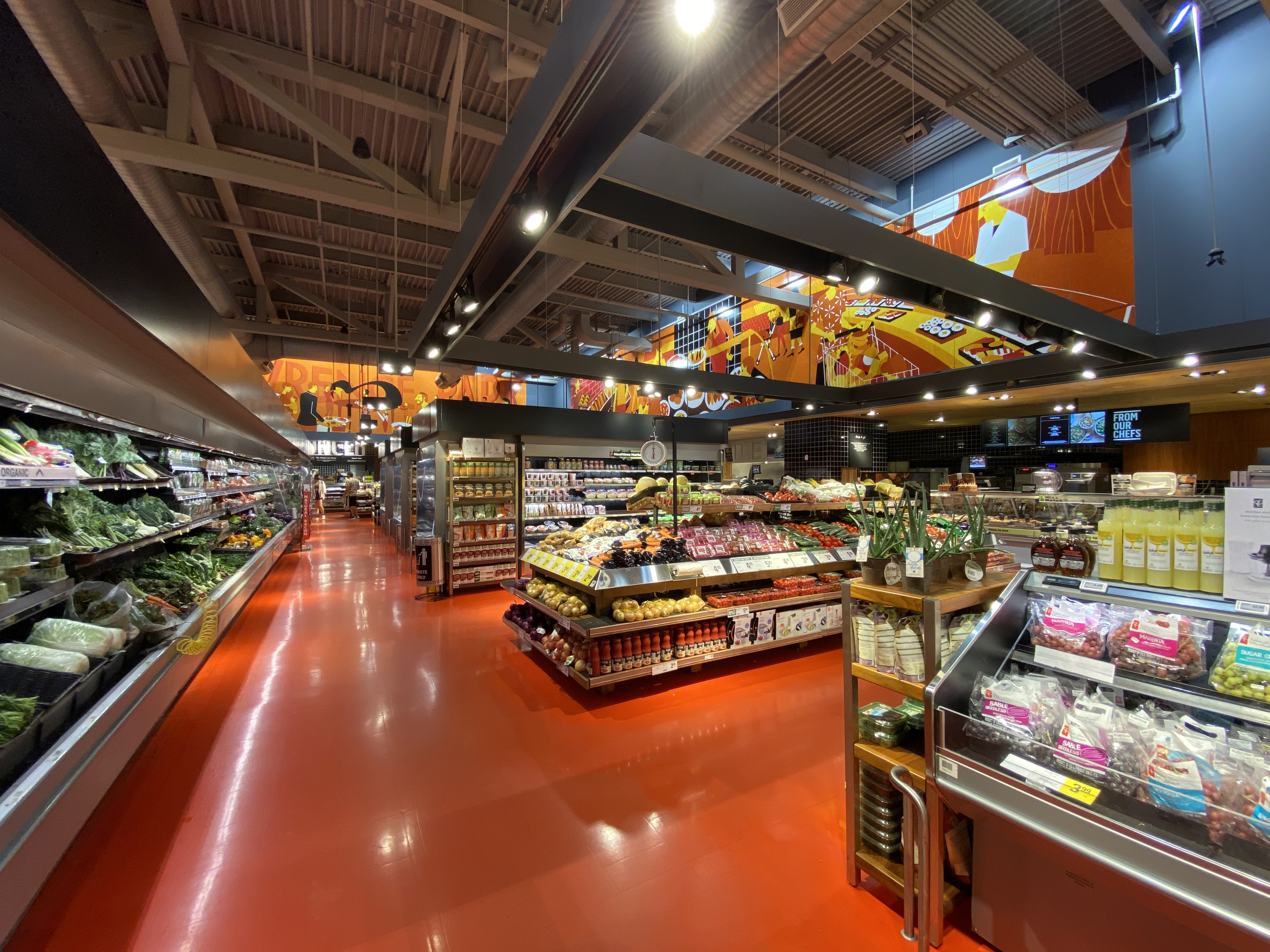
George's Independent City Market in 3080 Yonge Street, Toronto

Your Independent Grocer (YIG), known colloquially as "Independent" or "Yours" is a supermarket chain in Canada with more than 100 locations. It has stores in every province and territory except Manitoba, Nunavut, and Quebec. It is a unit of National Grocers, itself a unit of Loblaw Companies Limited. Stores are typically operated by a franchise owner. Many of the stores were originally Ottawa-area outlets of the defunct Quebec-based Steinberg's grocery chain. When Steinberg's was bought out by Metro Richelieu in 1992, the Ottawa-area franchises were spun off into the separate Your Independent Grocer chain. Many SaveEasy locations in Atlantic Canada became Your Independent Grocer locations between 2014 and 2016. In May 2018, select locations began delivery through Instacart.

Former logo, still used on some locations

== See also ==
- Valu-mart
- List of supermarket chains in Canada
