= Kate Hobhouse =

British heiress, businesswoman & philanthropist (b.1962)

- Born: Anna Catrina Weston; July 1962 (age 64)
- Education: University of Bristol
- Occupation: Businesswoman
- Spouse: William Hobhouse
- Children: 5
- Parent(s): Garry Weston; Mary Kippenberger
- Relatives: George Weston (paternal great-grandfather); W. Garfield Weston (paternal grandfather); Howard Kippenberger (maternal grandfather); Sir Guy Weston (brother); Jana Khayat (sister); George G. Weston (brother)

Anna Catrina "Kate" Hobhouse (née Weston; born July 1962) is a British heiress, businesswoman and philanthropist who is a member of the Weston family. She is the chairman of Fortnum & Mason, an upscale department store located on Piccadilly in London.

== Early life ==
She is the third of six children of Garry Weston, who was the chairman of Associated British Foods, and her paternal grandfather was W. Garfield Weston. She graduated from the University of Bristol.

== Career ==
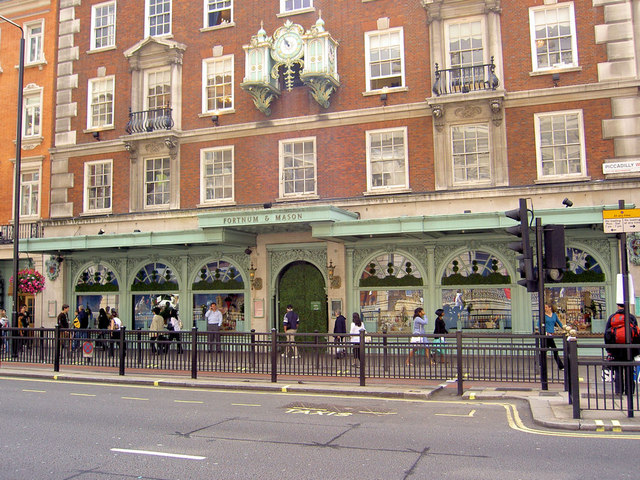
Fortnum & Mason on Piccadilly

Hobhouse started her career at Fortnum & Mason, a high-end department store that is owned by her family through Wittington Investments. She serves as its chairman.

In addition, Hobhouse is on the Garfield Weston Foundation board of trustees.

== Personal life ==
She is married to William Hobhouse, the chairman of Heal's. They have five children. They reside in the Soho area of London, and in Hertfordshire.
