= Jana Khayat =

British heiress and businesswoman (born 1961)

- Born: Jana Ruth Weston; August 1961 (age 64)
- Education: University of Oxford
- Occupation: Businesswoman
- Spouse: Antoine Khayat
- Children: 3
- Parent(s): Garry Weston; Mary Kippenberger
- Relatives: George Weston (paternal great-grandfather); W. Garfield Weston (paternal grandfather); Howard Kippenberger (maternal grandfather); Sir Guy Weston (brother); Kate Hobhouse (sister); George G. Weston (brother)

Jana Ruth Khayat (née Weston; born August 1961) is a British heiress and businesswoman who is a member of the Weston family. She is on the board of the Fortnum & Mason department store in London.

== Early life ==
She was born Jana Ruth Weston in August 1961, the second of six children of Garry Weston, who was the chairman of Associated British Foods. She graduated from the University of Oxford with a history degree.

== Career ==
Khayat began her career by joining the management team of Fortnum & Mason, which is owned by her family. Since the death of her father, her brothers George and Guy have run Associated British Foods and Wittington Investments (the parent company of Fortnums's and ABF) respectively, while Khayat ran Fortnum's with help from her younger sister, Kate Hobhouse, as a non-executive director. Khayat was chairman until July 2008.

She is also on the Garfield Weston Foundation's board of trustees.

== Personal life ==
She and her husband, Antoine Khayat, have three children. She is a keen equestrian and horse breeder.
