= Weston family =

Business family in Canada, Ireland and UK

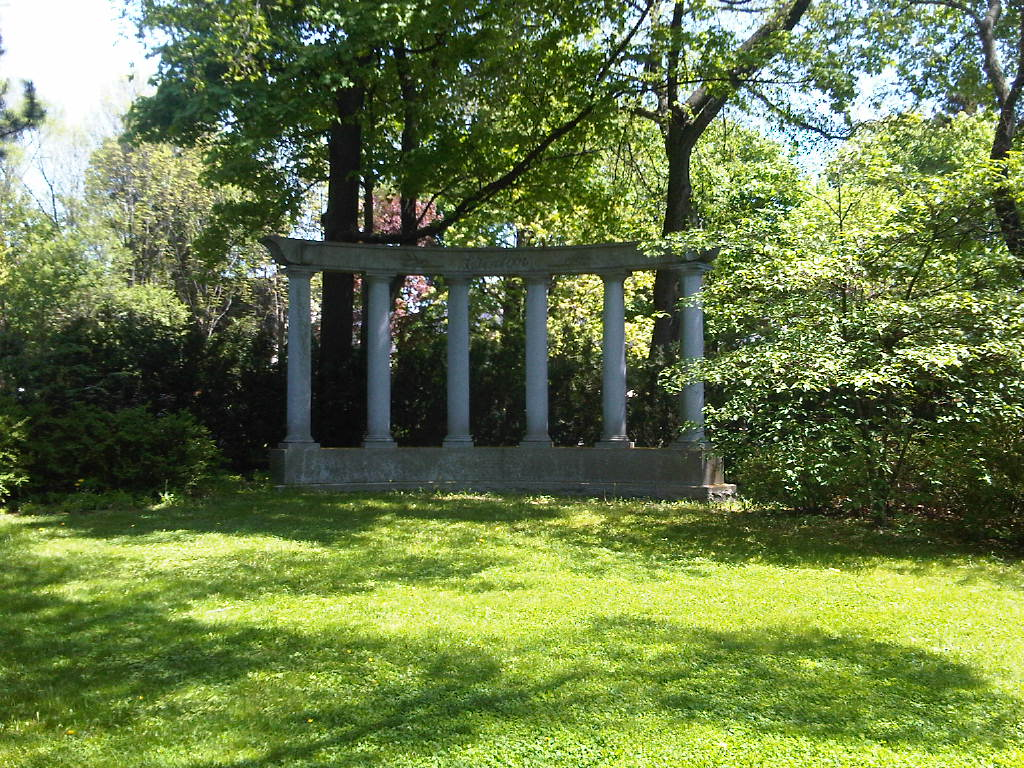
The Weston family's monument at Mount Pleasant Cemetery, Toronto

The Weston family is a prominent family of businesspeople that was founded in Canada and eventually developed global business interests, primarily in the food and retail sectors. The family operations began with the purchase of a bakery in 1884 by American-born Canadian George Weston in Toronto, Ontario. Over the course of subsequent decades, his descendants also established themselves in the United Kingdom, Ireland and the United States.

Through George Weston Limited and various holding companies, the Canadian branch of the Weston family currently owns or controls over 200 companies, including the Loblaws supermarket chain and the Shoppers Drug Mart pharmacy chain. Among their other businesses, members of this branch own or control several additional retailers, including Holt Renfrew in Canada. They previously owned other upscale department stores in the Selfridges Group, including Selfridges in the UK, Brown Thomas and Arnotts in Ireland, and De Bijenkorf in the Netherlands.

The main holding company of the British branch of the family is Wittington Investments. 79.2% of this company belongs to a British charitable trust called the Garfield Weston Foundation, with the balance owned by various family members. Wittington Investments owns a majority stake in Associated British Foods (which itself owns the discount clothing chain Primark), and 100% of British retailers Fortnum & Mason and Heal's.

In 2021, The Sunday Times named the Weston family among the most charitable people over the past 20 years, with donations of £1.661 billion.

== Wealth ==
In 2018, the Westons were named Ireland's richest family for the tenth year running, with a wealth of €11.42 billion.

In the Sunday Times Rich List 2020 ranking of the wealthiest people in the UK, "Guy Weston, Galen Weston Jr., George G. Weston and family" placed 8th in the list, with an estimated family fortune of £10.53 billion.

== Family members ==
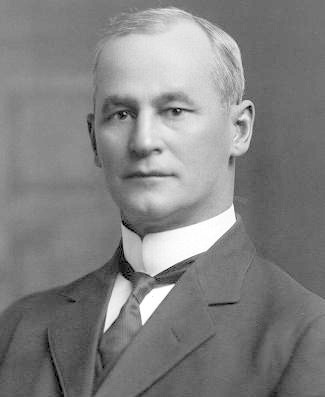
George Weston in 1911

- George Weston (1864–1924), married Emma Maud Richards; six children (of whom two sons and two daughters survived childhood), including:
  - W. Garfield Weston (1898–1978), married Reta Lila Howard (1897–1967); nine children:
    - Miriam Louise Weston (1922–2008), married Charles Ryland Burnett Jr. (1918–2004); one child:
      - Charles Ryland Burnett III (1956–2018)
    - George Grainger Weston (1923–2023), married the Hon. Caroline Cecily Douglas-Scott-Montagu (1925–2017), daughter of John Douglas-Scott-Montagu, 2nd Baron Montagu of Beaulieu; five children
      - Galvin Weston
      - Sarah Weston
      - Gregg Weston
      - Glenn Weston
      - Graham Weston
    - Barbara Elizabeth Weston (1926–2001), married Dr. Robert Ian Mitchell (1927–2002); six children:
      - Garfield Mitchell, two children
      - Eliza Mitchell
      - Mark W. Mitchell
      - Emma Susan Mitchell, married Charles Adamo
      - Sarah Mitchell, married Eric Siebert
      - Serena Mitchell, mother of 1 child
    - Garry Weston (1927–2002), married Mary Kippenberger, daughter of Major General Sir Howard Kippenberger; six children:
      - Sir Guy Weston (born 1960)
      - Jana Khayat (born 1961)
      - Kate Hobhouse (born 1962)
      - George G. Weston (born 1964)
      - Sophia Mason (born 1966)
      - Garth Weston (born 1969),
    - Nancy Weston, married Stanley Baron
    - Wendy Weston (born 1931), married Leslie Rebanks
      - Tamara Rebanks, married James Appleyard
      - Claudia Rebanks,
    - Gretchen Weston (born 1934), married Humberto Bauta
    - Camilla Weston (born 1937), married Peter Dalglish; three children:
      - Kim Dalglish, married Martin Abell
      - Geordie Dalglish, married Swith Bell
      - Genevieve Dalglish (1970–2017)
    - Galen Weston (1940–2021), married Hilary Frayne (1942-2025); two children:
      - Alannah Weston (born 1972), married Alexander Cochrane, elder son of Sir Marc Cochrane, 4th Baronet
      - Galen Weston Jr. (born 1972), married Alexandra Schmidt, granddaughter of Thomas J. Bata

== See also ==
- Garfield Weston Foundation (based in the United Kingdom)
- Weston Family Foundation (based in Canada)
