= Will Hobhouse =

English businessman and investor (born 1956)

William Hobhouse
- Born: William Arthur Hobhouse; September 1956 (age 69)
- Education: Bristol University
- Title: Chairman, Heal's
- Term: 2012-2017
- Spouse: Kate Hobhouse
- Children: 5
- Parent(s): Henry Hobhouse; Pamela Hill
- Relatives: Garry Weston (father-in-law); Sir Arthur Hobhouse (grandfather)

William Arthur Hobhouse (born September 1956) is an English businessman and investor, former chairman of the furniture store chain Heal's. He was appointed High Sheriff of Hertfordshire in March 2017.

== Early life ==
He is the son of Henry Hobhouse (1924–2016), and the grandson of Sir Arthur Hobhouse, the Liberal politician. Hobhouse was educated at Bristol University, where he studied Economics and Economic History. He worked for Associated British Foods during university holidays, and the company subsequently paid for his education at business school.

== Career ==
As a retailer, Hobhouse has worked with high street names such as Tie Rack, Whittard of Chelsea, Jack Wills, and Heal's, to restaurants such as Villandry and Le Pain Quotidien. Hobhouse has been the CEO of Tie Rack, and Whittard of Chelsea, as well as chairman of Jack Wills and Explore Learning among others. In March 2017 Will Hobhouse was appointed High Sheriff of Hertfordshire and his term of office runs until April 2018.

== Personal life ==
Hobhouse is married to Kate Hobhouse, daughter of Garry Weston, and chair of Fortnum & Mason and a trustee of the Garfield Weston charitable foundation. They have five children and live in Soho, London and Chorleywood in Hertfordshire.
