= Garry Weston =

Canadian businessman who was active in the United Kingdom

Garry Weston CBE
- Born: Garfield Howard Weston; April 28, 1927; Toronto, Ontario, Canada
- Died: February 15, 2002 (aged 74); London, England
- Occupation: Businessman
- Spouse: Mary Kippenberger
- Children: Guy Weston; Jana Khayat; Kate Hobhouse; George G. Weston; Sophia Mason; Garth Weston
- Parent(s): W. Garfield Weston; Reta Lila Howard
- Relatives: Howard Kippenberger (father-in-law); Will Hobhouse (son-in-law); Galen Weston (brother)

Garfield Howard "Garry" Weston CBE (April 28, 1927 – February 15, 2002) was a Canadian businessman who was active in the United Kingdom and a member of the Weston family.

== Early life ==
Born in Toronto, Ontario, he was the son of Reta (née Howard) and W. Garfield Weston, owner of the George Weston Limited food conglomerate headquartered in Toronto. He was the fourth of their nine children. Weston moved to England with his family at the age of four, but he always kept his Canadian citizenship.

== Career ==
Working in his father's business, at the age of 22, he invented the Wagon Wheels biscuit which carried the family name. He became managing director of Ryvita in 1951, but left in 1954 to co-found the Weston Biscuit Company in Australia. He returned to the UK to manage Associated British Foods (ABF), which his father had established in 1935. He served on its Board of Directors from 1949, taking over as company chairman in 1967. He remained on the board until 2000.

He served as head of the Garfield Weston Foundation and was a benefactor of numerous philanthropic projects. For instance, in 1999, he directed a 20 million pound donation to the British Museum from the Garfield Weston Foundation, set up in 1958 with money from his parents, siblings and himself.

== Personal life ==
Weston married Mary Kippenberger, daughter of Major-General Sir Howard Kippenberger, and they had six children together: Guy, Jana, Kate, George, Sophia and Garth. His son George is chief executive of ABF, and son Guy is chairman of Wittington Investments Limited, ABF's major shareholder. His other children are Jana Khayat, Kate Hobhouse, Sophia Mason and Garth Weston.

== Death ==
He suffered a stroke in 1999 and died in 2002.
