= Emma Adamo =

British businesswoman (born c. 1963)

- Born: Emma Susan Mitchell c. 1963 (aged 61)
- Education: Graduation from Stanford University; M.B.A. from INSEAD
- Occupation: Businesswoman
- Spouse: Charles Adamo

Emma Susan Adamo (née Mitchell; born c. 1963) is a British businesswoman and member of the Weston family.

== Early life ==
Emma Susan Mitchell was born circa 1963. She is the granddaughter of W. Garfield Weston. She graduated from Stanford University and received an M.B.A. from the INSEAD. She also married Charles Adamo.

== Career ==
Adamo has sat on the Board of Directors of Associated British Foods (LSE: ABF), a British multinational food processing and retailing company, since 9 December 2011, replacing Galen Weston (1940–2021). She also sits on the Board of Directors of Wittington Investments, a privately owned investment company.
