= Guy Weston =

British businessman and philanthropist

Sir Guy Weston
- Born: 3 July 1960 (age 66); Sydney, Australia
- Education: Westminster School
- Alma mater: Merton College, Oxford; INSEAD
- Occupation: Businessman
- Spouse: Ina Sarikhani
- Children: 3 sons, 1 daughter
- Parent(s): Garry Weston; Mary Weston
- Relatives: W. Garfield Weston (paternal grandfather); Howard Kippenberger (maternal grandfather); George G. Weston (brother); Jana Khayat (sister)

Sir Guy Howard Weston (born 3 July 1960) is a British businessman and philanthropist. He is a member of the Weston family.

== Biography ==
Weston was born on 3 July 1960 in Sydney, Australia. He is the eldest son of Garry Weston and Mary Weston, and brother of George G. Weston. His paternal grandfather was W. Garfield Weston.

Weston was educated at Westminster School and Merton College, Oxford. He read for the Bar, and then took an MBA at INSEAD.

== Career ==
Weston began his career as an investment banker at Morgan, Grenfell & Co. from 1984 to 1987. He was the managing director of Jacksons of Piccadilly from 1990 to 1993, and Ryvita from 1993 to 2000. He was the chairman of Heal's from 2001 to 2012. He was a non-executive director of Carpetright from 2005 to 2011.

Weston has been the chairman of Wittington Investments since 2012.

== Philanthropy ==
Weston is the chairman of the Garfield Weston Foundation. Since Weston’s appointment as chairman, the Foundation has become the largest grant-making foundation in the UK, with total grants exceeding £1 billion. In December 2020, Sir Guy was recognized for the expertise and strategic advice devoted both to the Foundation and the charities it has supported during his 20-year Chairmanship and 35-year role as Trustee.

He serves on the board of trustees of the Thrombosis Research Institute. He is an honorary fellow of Merton College, Oxford and an honorary fellow of the Royal College of Art.

Weston has led a number of successful campaigns to help charities raise funds for causes, including the Bodleian Library in Oxford and Westminster Abbey. He has also given his expertise to support charities’ strategy and income, including serving on the advisory panel for the Royal Society and chairing the commercial enterprise for the Imperial War Museum. In 2019, he was appointed to the Board of Trustees of the Imperial War Museum, and in 2023, he was appointed as the Board's Chair. In 2020, he was appointed to the Council of the Royal College of Music.

He was knighted in the 2021 New Year Honours for services to philanthropy and charity.

== Personal life ==
Weston married Charlotte Emily Brunet in 1986; they have three sons and one daughter. He later married Ina Sarikhani.
