= AB Mauri =

Bakeries of the United Kingdom

AB Mauri is an operating division of Associated British Foods (ABF). It was formed in 2004 from the bakery ingredients businesses that ABF had acquired, including those from Australian Burns Philp, Sohovos in Brazil, DSM in Europe, and Oregon-based Innovative Cereal Systems.

In January 2018, AB Mauri signed distribution deals with wine companies.

In 2021, AB Mauri placed 27th on FoodTalks' Global Top Specialty Oil Companies list.
