= Garfield Weston Merit Scholarships for Colleges =

Garfield Weston Merit Scholarships for Colleges (GWMSC) was a scholarship program that recognize exemplary college students who were passionate about their field of study and were interested in helping their communities. The program ran from 1998 to 2012.

== History ==
In 1998, The W. Garfield Weston Foundation collaborated with the Canadian Merit Scholarship Foundation (now the Loran Scholars Foundation) to start a scholarship program for college students. Over the course of 14 years, The W. Garfield Weston Foundation invested $14.6 million in 471 W. Garfield Weston Scholars and 409 college students who received regional or provincial awards.

== Awards ==
The Garfield Weston Merit Scholarship for Colleges (GWMSC) program presented three types of awards to students who were beginning their first year of college. The GWMSC presented National Awards to 25 students. This scholarship waived the tuition at a consortium college and was renewable for one or two years. The GWMSC also presented 18 regional awards, valued at $4,000 each for one year of college study. The third award was the $2,500 provincial award for one year of study.
