= Weston Family Foundation =

Canadian charitable foundation

- Named after: Weston family
- Established: 1958
- Founders: W. Garfield Weston and family
- Type: Private foundation
- Registration no.: 889015194
- Legal status: Registered charity
- Purpose: Helping charitable organizations make a difference and enhance the quality of life for Canadians
- Headquarters: Toronto, Ontario, Canada
- Region served: Canada and selected universities outside Canada
- Methods: Grantmaking
- Fields: Education, Land Conservation, Science in Canada’s North, Neuroscience and Microbiome Science
- Disbursements: $61.8 million (in 2023)
- Endowment: $424.3 million (2023)
- Staff: 28 (2023)
- Website: westonfoundation.ca
- Formerly called: W. Garfield Weston Foundation

The Weston Family Foundation (formerly The W. Garfield Weston Foundation) is a Canadian charitable foundation that makes grants for the benefit of Canadians.

The Foundation's main funding areas are "healthy ecosystems" and "healthy aging." In 2023, the foundation made $61.8 million in grant disbursements and had assets of $424 million.

== History ==
The foundation was created in 1958 with donations from W. Garfield Weston (1898–1978), and his wife Reta Lila Howard (1897–1967). The foundation was originally named after W. Garfield Weston, who established bakery and other enterprises throughout Canada and the world.

In the early 2020s, the foundation changed its name to the Weston Family Foundation.

== Funding areas ==
In 2007, the W. Garfield Weston Foundation dispensed approximately $10 million per year, including major gifts to the British Museum, the Nature Conservancy of Canada, the Ontario Science Centre and the Royal Ontario Museum. By 2010, the foundation had donated more than $100 million to conserve natural habitats in Canada.

In 2012, the foundation initiated the Weston Family Parks Challenge, announcing $5 million in funding over 3 years, to enhance Toronto's green spaces while encouraging private-public partnerships for their long-term sustainability. The foundation also supported the Weston Youth Innovation Award at the Ontario Science Centre, with past recipients including Ethan Chan.

In 2022, the Foundation launched a $33 million incubator fund to encourage the sustainable production of fruits and vegetables in Canada, particularly in regions with colder climates.

In 2024, the Foundation's main funding areas were "healthy ecosystems" and "healthy aging," with a specific focus on environmental stewardship, Canada's north, neuroscience and the microbiome.

== Endowment and disbursements ==
Funding for the Weston Family Foundation comes from business operations of the Weston family companies.

In 2006, the Weston Family Foundation (then called the W. Garfield Weston Foundation) reported assets of $43.5 million. At the end of 2016, the foundation had over $324 million in assets.

In 2023, the Weston Family Foundation made grant disbursements of $61.8 million. At the end of 2023, the foundation's assets were $424 million.

There is a familial connection between the Weston family foundations in Canada and the UK (the Garfield Weston Foundation in the UK), but each foundation works independently with a different team and board of directors.

== See also ==
- Garfield Weston Foundation (based in the United Kingdom)
- George Weston
- W. Garfield Weston
