= Bakers Oven =

British bakery chain that was acquired by Greggs

- Company type: Subsidiary
- Industry: Food (Bakery Group)
- Founded: 1976
- Defunct: December 2008
- Fate: All stores were rebranded as Greggs.
- Products: Baked goods; Bread; Chips & gravy; Drinks and pastries; Sandwiches
- Parent: Associated British Foods (1976–1994); Greggs (1994–2008)

Bakers Oven was a British bakery chain. In May 1994, it was acquired by Greggs. The number of stores was gradually reduced and, in December 2008, all remaining branches of Bakers Oven were rebranded as Greggs.

== History ==
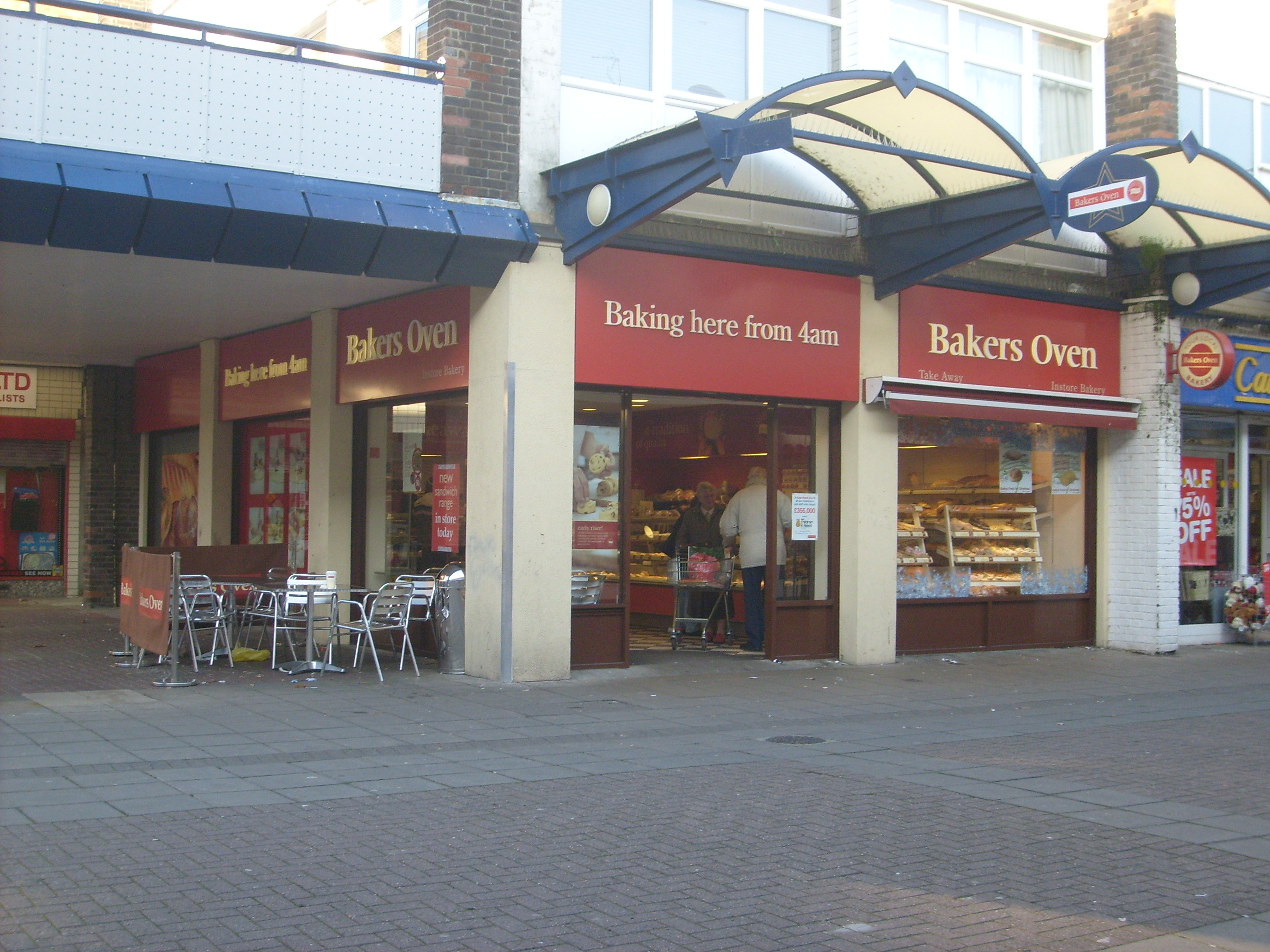
The front fascia of a Bakers Oven.

Bakers Oven was founded by Allied Bakeries in 1976, and its first location was in Barnard Castle. In 1984, the company acquired the sixty four outlets of Carricks of Newcastle, and converted them to Bakers Oven. In March 1990, there were 628 outlets and four main bakeries.

In May 1994, it was sold to Greggs for £18.5 million in cash. The transaction included 424 shops and two main bakeries, one in Twickenham, and one in Newcastle. The majority of outlets of Bakers Oven were located in the South of England, whilst most Greggs outlets were in the North, so the property portfolios were complementary. 20% of stores were freehold.

Both chains had sales of around £100 million, but Greggs was significantly more profitable. 169 Bakers Oven outlets had in store bakeries, and 170 outlets provided seating. After the takeover by Greggs, shops of Bakers Oven coexisted with Greggs, offering higher quality at higher prices, and focussing on a higher socioeconomic demographic. The 2007 Retail Directory stated that there were 216 outlets of Bakers Oven.

=== Rebranding to Greggs ===
On 9 December 2008, Greggs announced that Bakers Oven South and Midlands divisions would fully merge with Greggs plc. All 165 shops of Bakers Oven became Greggs, forming the division of Greggs East.
