= Ladbrooks =

- Rural locality
- Interactive map of Ladbrooks
- Coordinates: 43°37′S 172°32′E
- Country: New Zealand
- Region: Canterbury
- Territorial authority: Selwyn District
- Ward: Springs
- Electorates: Selwyn; Wigram; Te Tai Tonga (Māori)

Government
  - Territorial authority: Selwyn District Council
  - Regional council: Environment Canterbury
  - Mayor of Selwyn: Lydia Gliddon
  - Selwyn MP/Wigram MP: Nicola Grigg/Dominik Yanzick
  - Te Tai Tonga MP: Mananui Ramsden

Area
  - Total: 49.76 km^{2} (19.21 sq mi)
- Elevation: 25 m (82 ft)

Population (June 2025)
  - Total: 1,860
  - Density: 37.4/km^{2} (96.8/sq mi)
- Time zone: UTC+12 (New Zealand Standard Time)
  - Summer (DST): UTC+13 (New Zealand Daylight Time)
- Area code: 03

Ladbrooks is a locality in Canterbury, New Zealand. It is named after William and Eliza Ladbrook, who moved to the area in 1842 on the boat the Birman.

Ladbrooks Hall, built in 1913, was substantially extended in the 1960s.

== Demographics ==
Ladbrooks statistical area covers 49.76 km^{2} (19.21 sq mi). It had an estimated population of 1,860 as of June 2025, with a population density of 37 people per km^{2}.

Historical population
Year	Pop.	±% p.a.
2006	1,299	—
2013	1,575	+2.79%
2018	1,698	+1.52%
2023	1,788	+1.04%
The 2006 population is for a larger area of 50.04 km^{2}. Source:

Ladbrooks had a population of 1,788 in the 2023 New Zealand census, an increase of 90 people (5.3%) since the 2018 census, and an increase of 213 people (13.5%) since the 2013 census. There were 891 males, 888 females, and 9 people of other genders in 618 dwellings. 2.2% of people identified as LGBTIQ+. The median age was 46.6 years (compared with 38.1 years nationally). There were 339 people (19.0%) aged under 15 years, 276 (15.4%) aged 15 to 29, 858 (48.0%) aged 30 to 64, and 315 (17.6%) aged 65 or older.

People could identify as more than one ethnicity. The results were 95.3% European (Pākehā); 6.2% Māori; 0.5% Pasifika; 2.7% Asian; 0.5% Middle Eastern, Latin American and African New Zealanders (MELAA); and 3.4% other, which includes people giving their ethnicity as "New Zealander". English was spoken by 98.5%, Māori by 1.2%, Samoan by 0.2%, and other languages by 6.0%. No language could be spoken by 1.5% (e.g. too young to talk). New Zealand Sign Language was known by 0.7%. The percentage of people born overseas was 15.6, compared with 28.8% nationally.

Religious affiliations were 33.1% Christian, 0.2% Hindu, 0.3% Islam, 0.2% Buddhist, 0.2% New Age, and 0.5% other religions. People who answered that they had no religion were 58.1%, and 7.7% of people did not answer the census question.

Of those at least 15 years old, 453 (31.3%) people had a bachelor's or higher degree, 777 (53.6%) had a post-high school certificate or diploma, and 222 (15.3%) people exclusively held high school qualifications. The median income was $47,900, compared with $41,500 nationally. 300 people (20.7%) earned over $100,000 compared to 12.1% nationally. The employment status of those at least 15 was 729 (50.3%) full-time, 309 (21.3%) part-time, and 21 (1.4%) unemployed.

== Education ==
Ladbrooks School is a full primary school catering for years 1 to 8. It had a roll of 134 as of July 2026. The school opened in 1889.
