= George G. Weston =

British businessman

- Born: George Garfield Weston; 4 March 1964 (age 61); United Kingdom
- Education: Westminster School
- Alma mater: New College, Oxford; Harvard Business School
- Occupation(s): CEO, Associated British Foods
- Children: 4
- Parent: Garry Weston
- Relatives: Jana Khayat (sister); Guy Weston (brother)

George Garfield Weston (born 4 March 1964) is a British businessman, and chief executive officer (CEO) of Associated British Foods. He is a member of the Weston family.

== Early life ==
George G. Weston was born on 4 March 1964 in the United Kingdom. He is the son of Garry Weston and Mary Ruth Kippenberger.

Weston attended the Westminster School and then New College, Oxford. He holds an MA in PPE and an MBA from Harvard Business School.

== Career ==
Weston was managing director of Westmill Foods (who make Allinson Flour) from 1992 to 1998, then Allied Bakeries from 1999 to 2003. He was chief executive of George Weston Foods Ltd (Australia) from 2003 to 2005. He became CEO of ABF plc in 2005.

== Personal life ==
Weston married Katharine Acland, daughter of Sir Antony Acland, in January 1996 in Windsor and Maidenhead. They have one daughter (born September 1999) and three sons (born March 2001, April 2002 and July 2004).
