= Associated British Foods =

British food company

Associated British Foods plc
- Formerly: George Weston Holdings plc (1934–1994)
- Type: Public
- Traded as: LSE: ABF; FTSE 100 Component
- Industry: Food processing; Retail
- Founded: 20 October 1935; 91 years ago
- Founder: W. Garfield Weston
- Headquarters: London, England, UK
- Area served: Worldwide
- Key people: Michael McLintock (Chairperson); George G. Weston (CEO)
- Products: Food; ingredients
- Revenue: ▲£19.582 billion (2026)
- Operating income: ▼£1.327 billion (2026)
- Net income: ▼£0.939 billion (2026)
- Total assets: ▲£20.266 billion (2026)
- Total equity: ▲£11.770 billion (2026)
- Owner: Wittington Investments (54.5%)
- Number of employees: 140,000 (2026)
- Subsidiaries: AB Agri; AB Mauri; AB Sugar; AB World Foods; Hovis Bakeries; Allied Mills; ACH Food Companies; British Sugar; Dorset Cereals; Illovo Sugar; Primark; Wander AG
- Website: abf.co.uk

Associated British Foods plc (ABF) is a British multinational food processing and retailing company headquartered in London.

Its ingredients division is the world's fourth-largest producer of sugar and second-largest producer of baker's yeast, and is a major producer of other ingredients including emulsifiers, enzymes and lactose. Its grocery division is a major manufacturer of both branded and private label grocery products and includes the brands Mazola, Ovaltine, Ryvita, Jordans, Kingsmill and Twinings. Its retail division, Primark, has some 384 stores across several countries, predominantly Germany, Ireland, Netherlands, Spain, and the UK. ACH Food Companies is an American subsidiary.

Associated British Foods is listed on the London Stock Exchange and is a constituent of the FTSE 100 Index.

== History ==
=== 20th century ===
The company was founded by Canadian W. Garfield Weston in 1935, initially as Food Investments Limited, with the name changing to Allied Bakeries Limited a month later.

Between 1935 and 1956, ten national and regional bakery companies were acquired by Allied, including Barrett and Pomeroy, and London and Provincial Bakeries. The largest acquisition at this time was in 1955 when Allied bought the British operations of the Aerated Bread Company, founded in 1862. This acquisition included both the bakery business and the chain of cafeterias, the A.B.C. Tearooms. Allied paid £3 million for A.B.C. At that time, Allied had a large share of the UK baked goods market. Allied's market share prior to acquiring A.B.C. was 10% of all UK bread production and the sale of 20 million biscuits per day. Allied's sales the year prior were £55 million with profits of £4.5 million. With the acquisition of A.B.C., Allied almost doubled its share of the UK's bread market by the end of the decade. In December 1954 they purchased from Howardsgate Trust the single Fine Fare Supermarket in Welwyn Garden City, the Welwyn Store grocery branches and the bakery businesses owned by the Trust.

Allied, under its new name, adopted in 1960, of Associated British Foods, continued to run A.B.C. as a separate brand after its takeover, with a major A.B.C. bakery in Camden Town, London. This closed in 1982 and the A.B.C. name was retired.

Following the death of the founder in 1978, control of the company was passed on to his son Garry, while the North American operations fell to his son Galen.

The company sold Fine Fare in 1986 to the Dee Corporation, and in 1991, went on to acquire British Sugar. In 1997, ABF sold its retail operations in Ireland (including Northern Ireland) to Tesco. These businesses were: Quinnsworth and Crazy Prices in the Republic of Ireland and Stewarts Supermarket Limited and Crazy Prices in Northern Ireland. This sale also included the Stewarts Winebarrel off-licence chain, Lifestyle Sports & Leisure Ltd (a retail sports and leisure business), Kingsway Fresh Foods (a meat processing facility) and Daily Wrap Produce (a fruit and vegetable packaging plant).

In May 1994, Greggs acquired the Bakers Oven chain from the company.

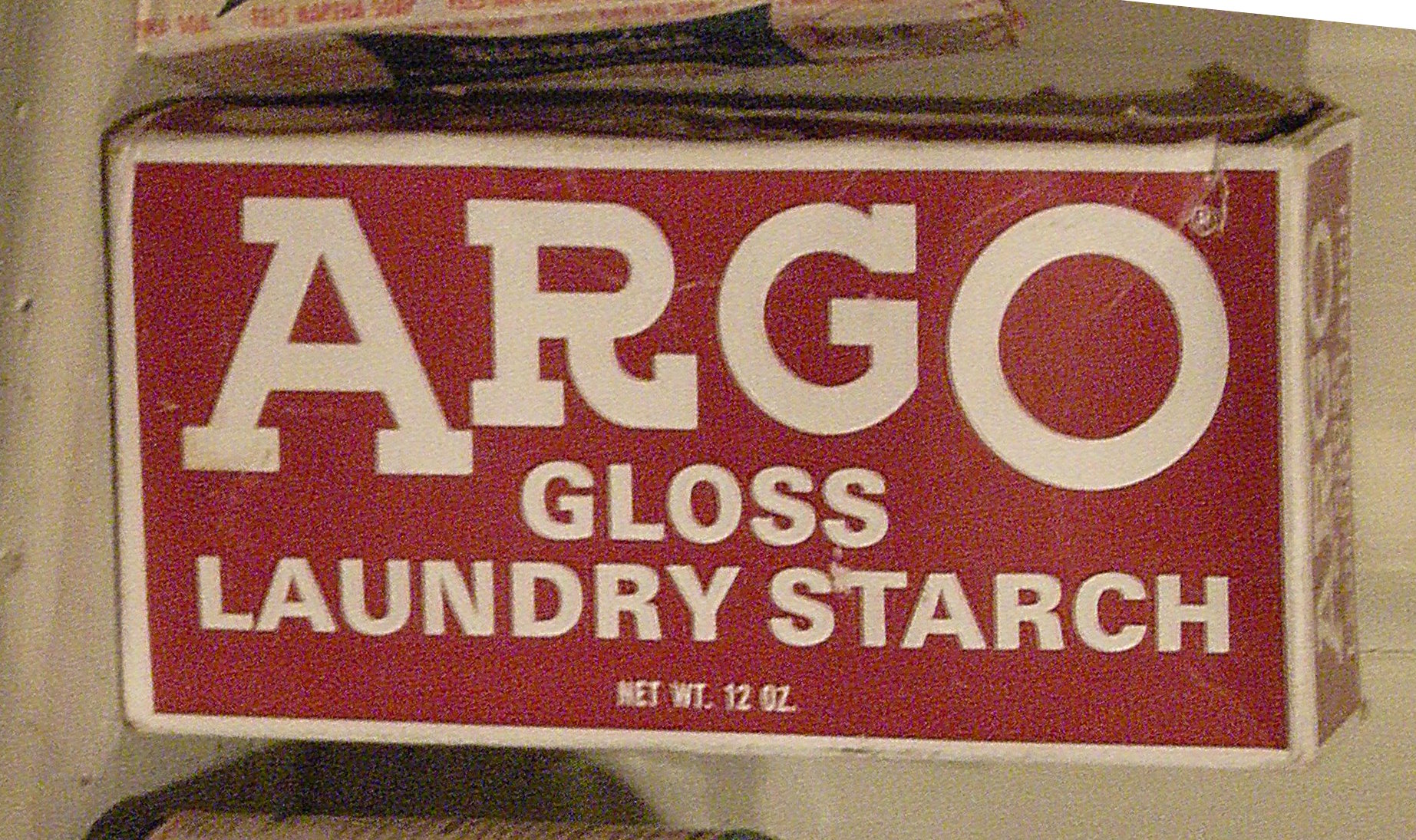
Old Argo laundry starch box, photographed at Edmonds Historical Museum

=== 21st century ===
In 2000, the company sold its interests in Burton's Biscuits. In 2002, it acquired the Mazola corn oil, Argo and Kingsford's cornstarch, Karo and Golden Griddle syrups, and Henri's dressing brands, along with several Canadian brands, from Unilever; in 2004, it acquired the Tone's spice business and Fleischman yeast business from Burns Philp; and in 2007, it purchased Patak's Indian food business.

On 26 March 2011, Associated British Foods, and its parent company Wittington Investments, were targeted over tax avoidance by UK Uncut during anti-cuts protests. The tax avoidance scheme involved moving capital between ABF/Primark and the affiliated Luxembourg entity ABF European Holdings & Co SNC by means of interest-free loans, avoiding tax of about £9.7 million per year. The protest took the form of a mass sit-in in Fortnum & Mason.

In February 2013, the firm denied any "illegal and immoral" tax evasion after it was accused by the international charity ActionAid of moving its profits outside Zambia to reduce its tax bill. The charity said Zambia Sugar, a unit of AB Foods, had made profits of US$123 million since 2007, but had paid "virtually no corporate tax" in Zambia.

In October 2013, the company stated that its African sugar producer subsidiary Illovo "is and always has been hugely sensitive to issues of land ownership" following reports by Oxfam on sugar-cane land conflicts, forced evictions, and land-grab allegations involving Coca-Cola, PepsiCo, and ABF. Following a social-media pressure campaign spearheaded by Oxfam, in 2014 the company created new policies committing to the principle of free, prior and informed consent (FPIC), which helps ensure communities are consulted and must give consent before the land they are using is sold.

In November 2024, George G. Weston, chief executive of ABF claimed that the recent UK Budget may lead it to invest more outside the UK over fears the High Street will bear the "weight of tax rises".

In August 2025, ABF announced that they had agreed to purchase the bread brand Hovis, a rival to its own bread brand Kingsmill, from the private equity firm Endless for £75m, pending approval by the Competition and Markets Authority. Approval for the acquisition was granted in June 2026 and the acquisition was completed in July 2026, rebranding Allied Bakeries to Hovis Bakeries.

In November 2025, ABF announced that it was exploring spinning-off its retail division Primark into its own entity. The company expects the split to be completed by the end of 2027.

== Operations ==
=== Brands ===
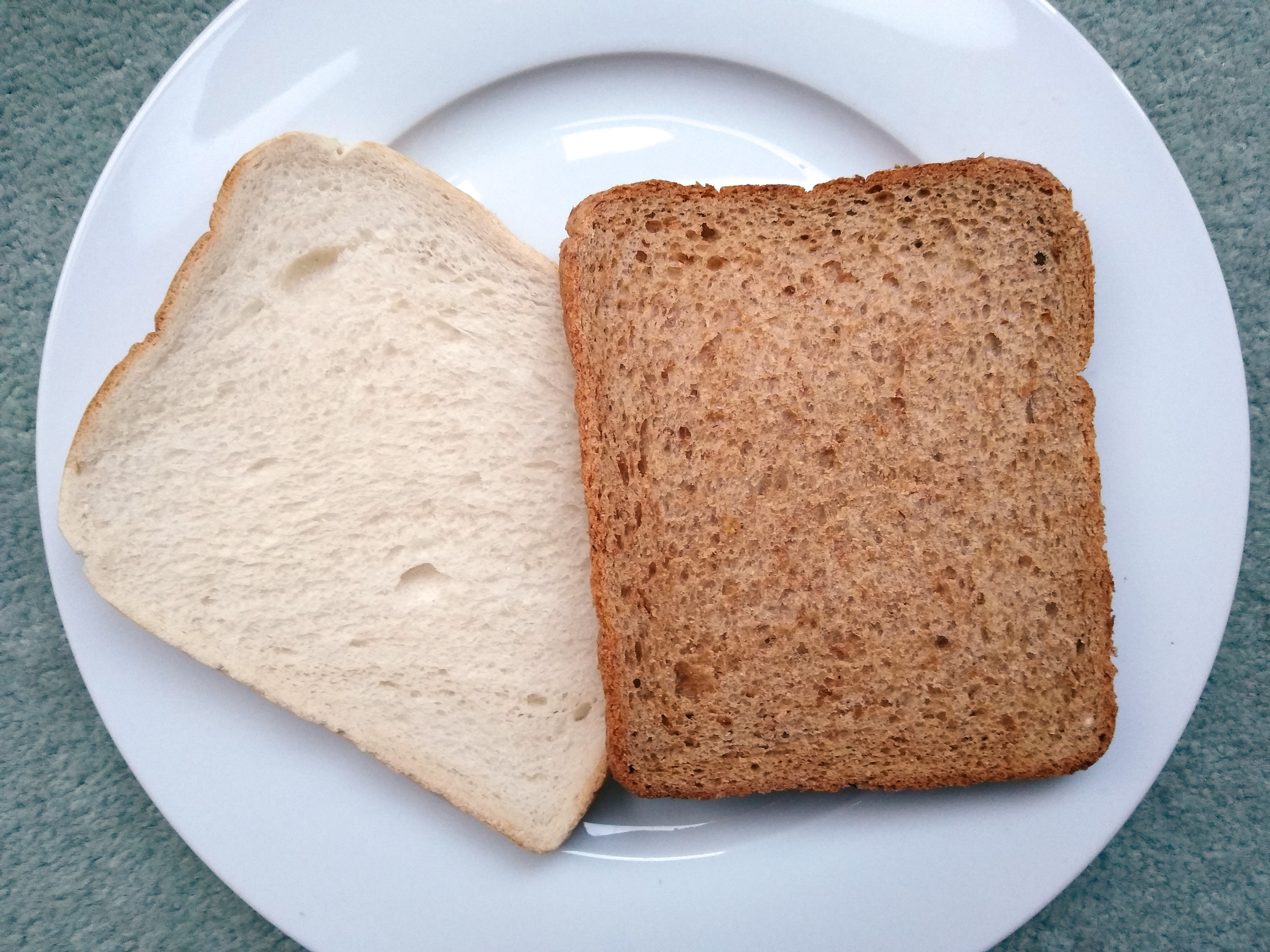
Two slices of Kingsmill bread

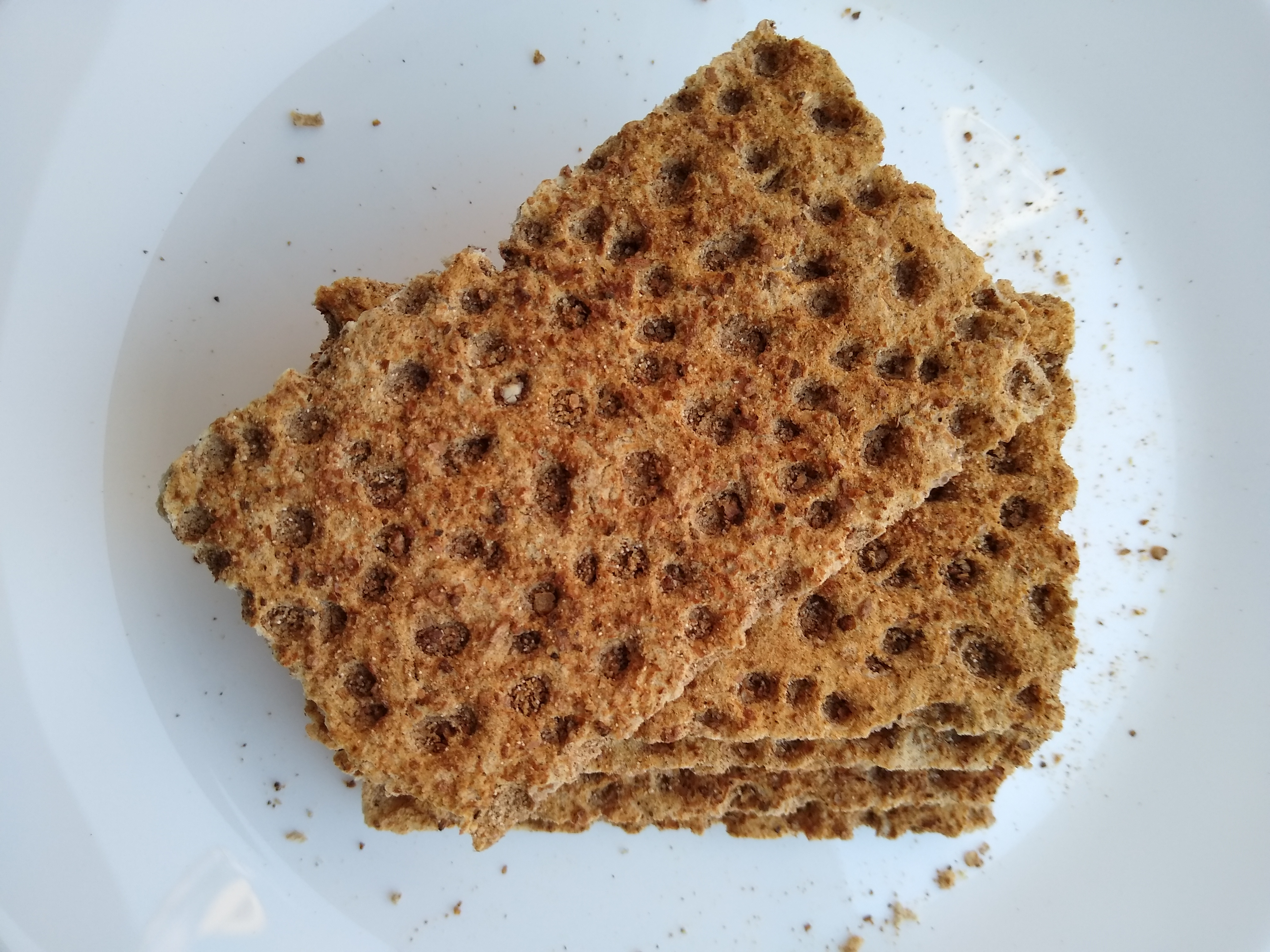
Ryvita crispbread

- Allinson
- Argo Corn Starch
- Aladino Peanut Butter
- Burgen
- Blue Dragon
- Capullo
- Dorset Cereals
- Dromedary cake mixes
- Elephant Atta
- Fleischmann's Yeast
- High5
- Jordans cereals
- Lucky Boat Noodles
- Karo corn syrup
- Kingsford's Corn Starch (North America)
- Kingsmill bread
- Mazola corn oil
- Ovaltine (except in the United States, where Nestlé owns the brand)
- Patak's
- Pride
- Ryvita
- Silver Spoon
- Sunblest
- Thai Lotus Pastes
- Tolly Boy Rice
- Twinings

=== Subsidiaries ===
- AB Agri Ltd
- AB Enzymes - an ABFI Company
- AB Sugar
- AB Mauri, bakery ingredients
- Abitec Corporation - an ABFI Company
- Abitec Ltd
- ACH Food Companies (AC HUMKO from 1995 to 2000), an American subsidiary of Associated British Foods, previously part of Kraft Foods from 1952 to 1995.
- ACH Food México
- Hovis Bakeries - a division of ABF Grain Products Ltd
- Allied Mills
- British Sugar
- Frontier Agriculture (50% joint venture with Cargill)
- George Weston Foods
- G Costa: sauces and specialty foods
- Illovo Sugar
  - Zambia Sugar
- OHLY - an ABFI Company
- PGP International, Inc. - an ABFI Company
- Primark – known as Penneys in the Republic of Ireland
- SPI Pharma, Inc. - an ABFI Company
- Stratas Foods LLC, a 50/50 joint venture between ABF's American subsidiary ACH and fellow American food corporation Archer Daniels Midland
- Wander AG
- Westmill Foods

== Board of directors ==
As of 2026, the company's board of directors consists of:

- Michael McLintock, Chairman
- George G. Weston, CEO
- Joana Edwards, Group Chief Financial Officer
- Eoin Tonge, Primark Chief Executive
- Heather Rabbatts, Independent non-executive director
- Emma Adamo, Independent non-executive director
- Graham Allan, Independent non-executive director
- Kumsal Bayazit Besson, Independent non-executive director
- Annie Murphy, Independent non-executive director
- Loraine Woodhouse, Independent non-executive director

== Controlling shareholder ==
Wittington Investments owns a controlling interest in ABF. 79.2% of the share capital of Wittington Investments is owned by the Garfield Weston Foundation, which is one of the UK's largest grant-making charitable trusts, and the remainder is owned by members of the Weston family. Wittington Investments also owns Fortnum & Mason and Heal & Son. George G. Weston became chief executive of ABF on 1 April 2005, and Galen Weston, the chief executive of George Weston Ltd., is a non-executive director. Garth Weston is Regional President of AB Mauri.
