= Fortnum & Mason =

Department store in London, England

Coordinates: 51.5083°N 0.1384°W

Fortnum & Mason plc

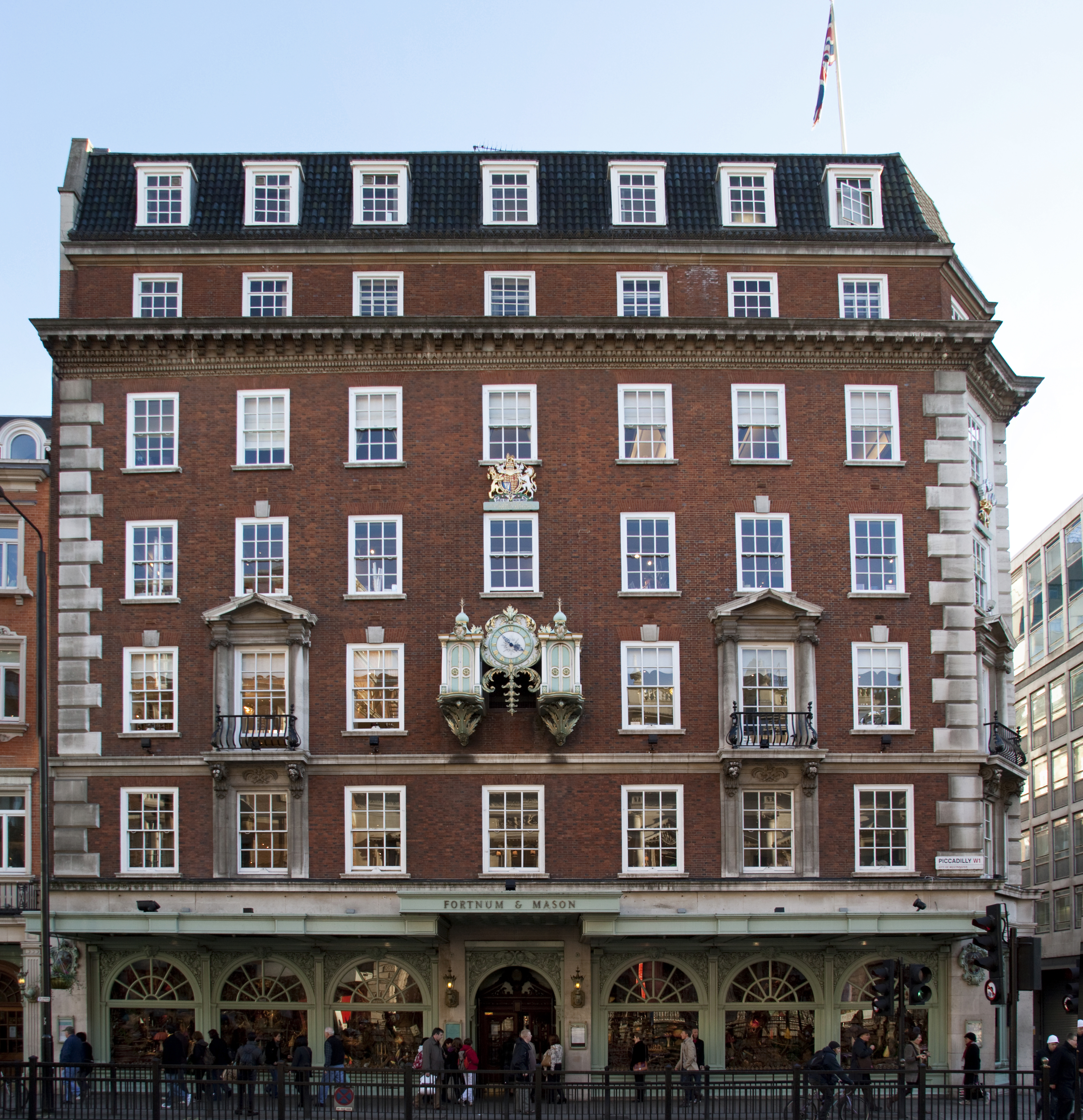
- Type: Subsidiary
- Industry: Retail
- Founded: 1707; 319 years ago
- Founders: William Fortnum; Hugh Mason
- Headquarters: London, England, UK
- Number of locations: Five (2019)
- Area served: United Kingdom; Hong Kong; Worldwide (via stockists and online)
- Key people: Marty Wikstrom (chairman); Thomas Athron (CEO)
- Products: Luxury goods
- Revenue: £239 million (year to July 2025)
- Number of employees: 708 (2016)
- Parent: Wittington Investments
- Website: www.fortnumandmason.com

Fortnum & Mason plc (colloquially often shortened to just Fortnum's) is an upmarket department store in London, England. The main store is located at 181 Piccadilly in the St James's area of London, where it was established in 1707 by William Fortnum and Hugh Mason. There are additional stores at The Royal Exchange, St Pancras railway station, Canary Wharf, Heathrow Airport, Victoria Dockside in Hong Kong, and Bicester Village, as well as various stockists worldwide. Fortnum & Mason has been privately owned by Wittington Investments Limited since 1951.

Founded as a grocery store, Fortnum's reputation was built on supplying high quality food, and it saw rapid growth throughout the Victorian era. Although Fortnum's developed into a department store, it continues to focus on stocking a variety of exotic and specialty food along with 'basic' provisions. It is known for its food hampers. The main store has since opened several other departments, such as the gentlemen's department on the first floor. It also contains a tea shop and several restaurants.

== History ==
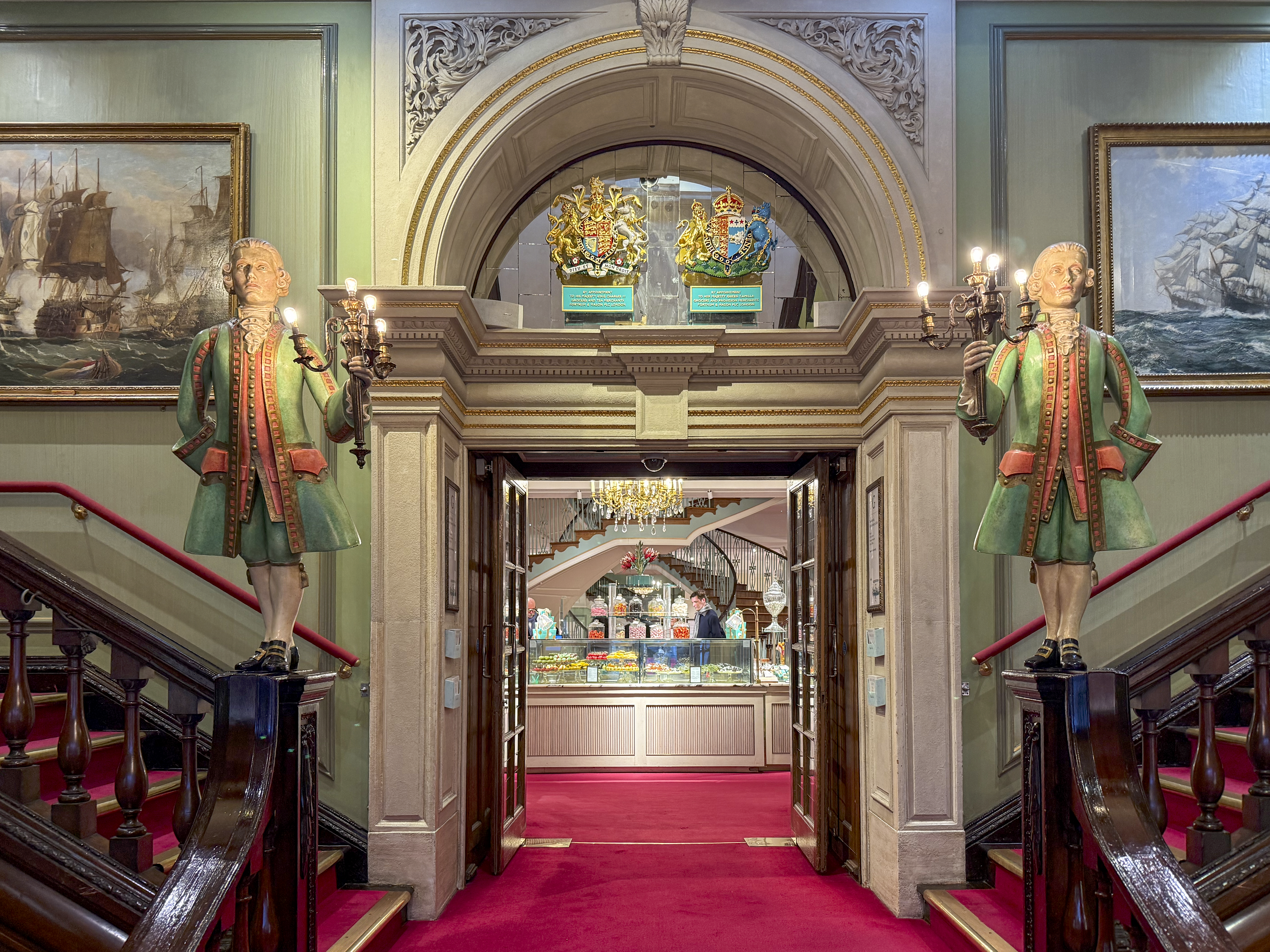
Entrance to Fortnum & Mason

William Fortnum was a footman in the household of Queen Anne. The royal family's insistence on having new candles every night resulted in large amounts of half-used wax, which Fortnum promptly resold. Fortnum also had a side business as a grocer. He convinced his landlord, Hugh Mason, to be his associate, and they founded the first Fortnum & Mason store in Mason's small shop at St James's Market in 1707. In 1761, William Fortnum's grandson Charles went into the service of Queen Charlotte, and the connection with the royal court led to an increase in business. Fortnum & Mason claims to have invented the Scotch egg, in 1738. The store began to stock speciality items, namely ready-to-eat luxury meals such as poultry or game served in aspic jelly.

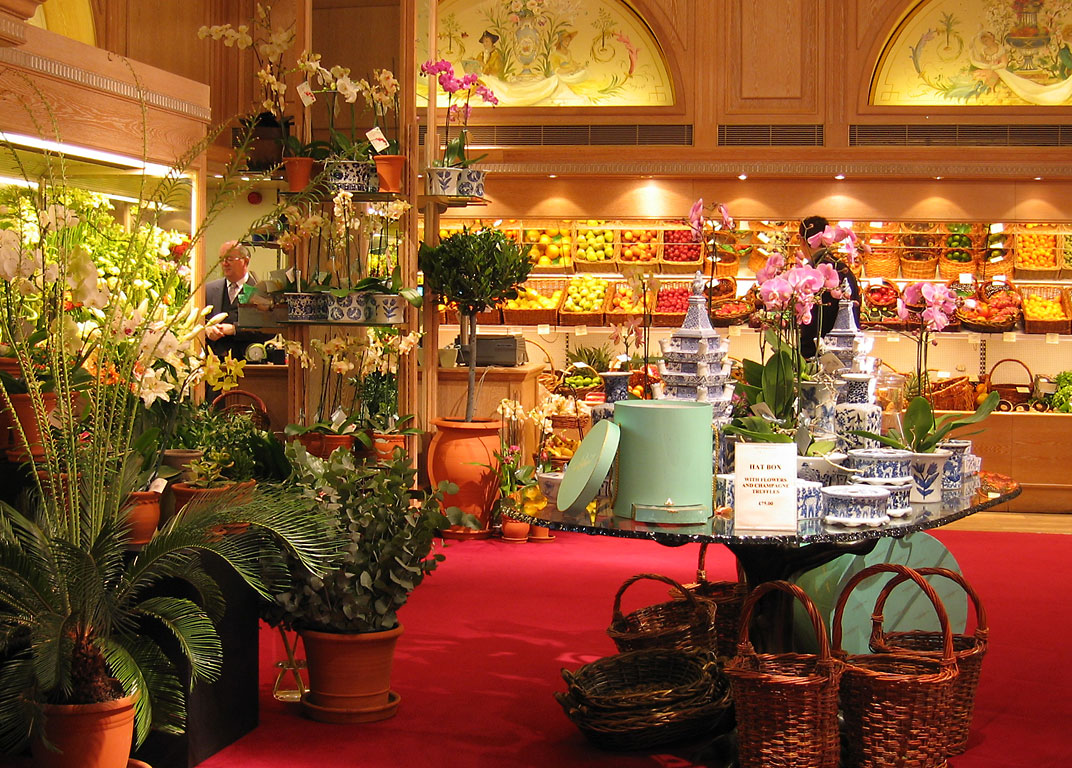
The fruit and flowers section on the ground floor

During the Napoleonic Wars, the emporium supplied dried fruit, spices and other preserves to British officers. In the Victorian era, it was frequently called upon to provide food for prestigious court functions. Queen Victoria sent shipments of Fortnum & Mason's concentrated beef tea to Florence Nightingale's hospitals during the Crimean War.

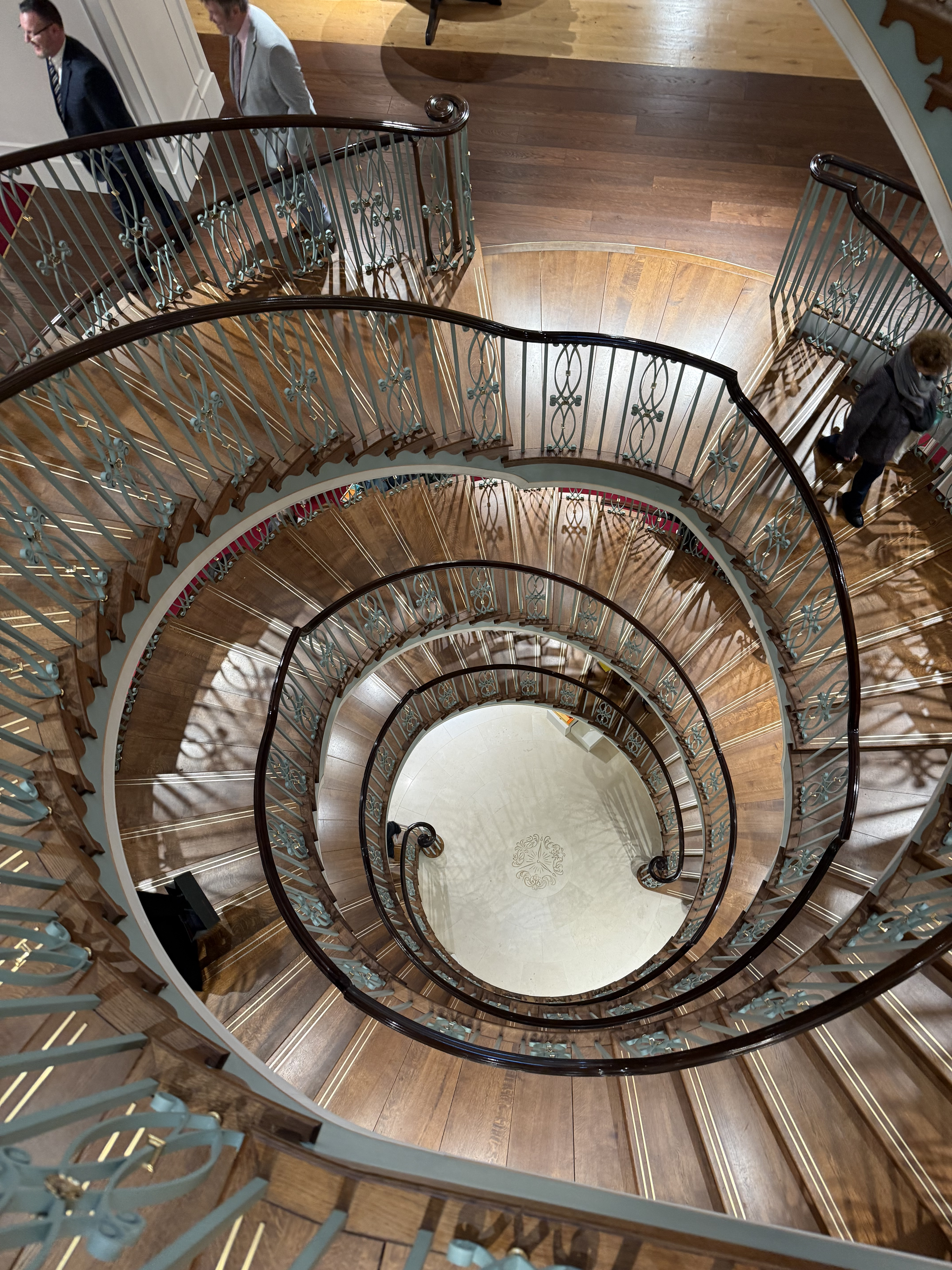
Main double-helix staircase in 2026

Charles Drury Edward Fortnum (1820–1899), of the family, was a distinguished art collector and a Trustee of the British Museum, to which he donated his collection of Islamic ceramics.

In 1886, after having bought the entire stock of five cases of a new product made by H. J. Heinz, Fortnum & Mason became the first store in Britain to stock tins of baked beans.

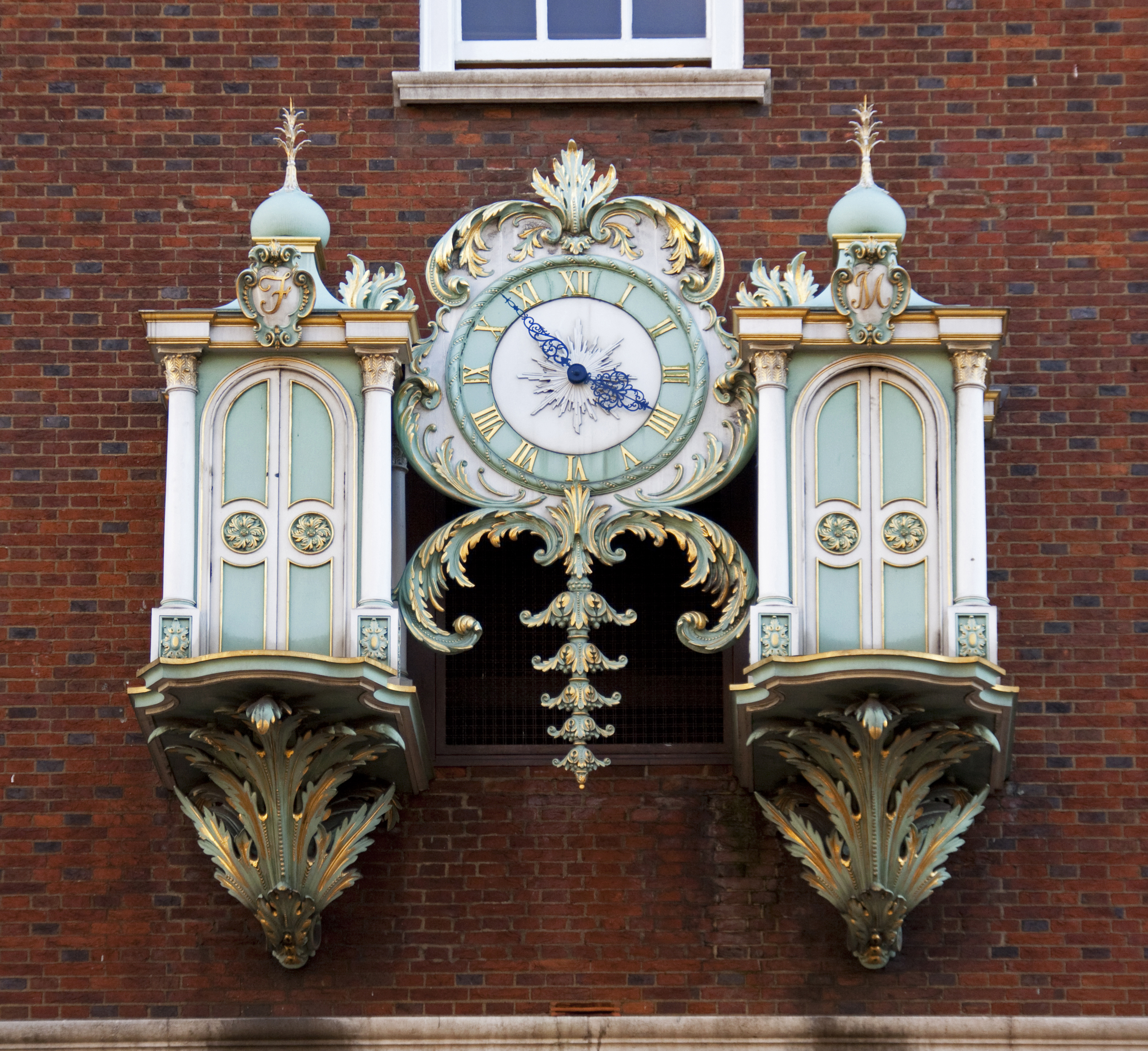
The mechanical clock on the main façade

The shop at 181–184 Piccadilly was rebuilt between 1926 and 1927 to a Neo-Georgian design by the architects Wimperis, Simpson and Guthrie. The building also incorporates 22–27 Duke Street and 42–45 Jermyn Street.

In April 1951, the Canadian businessman W. Garfield Weston acquired the store and became its chairman following a boardroom coup. In 1964, he commissioned a four-ton clock to be installed above the main entrance of the store as a tribute to its founders. Every hour, 4-foot-high (1.2 m) models of William Fortnum and Hugh Mason emerge and bow to each other, with chimes and 18th-century style music playing in the background. The chimes were incorporated into Jonathan Dove's orchestral adaptation of Zeb Soanes' children's book Gaspard's Foxtrot, which depicts the clock and its figures as illustrated by James Mayhew. Since Garfield Weston's death in 1978, the store has been run by two of his granddaughters, Jana Khayat and Kate Hobhouse. The Chief Executive Officer is Tom Athron, who joined the business in December 2020.

The store underwent a £24 million refurbishment in 2007 as part of its tercentenary celebrations.

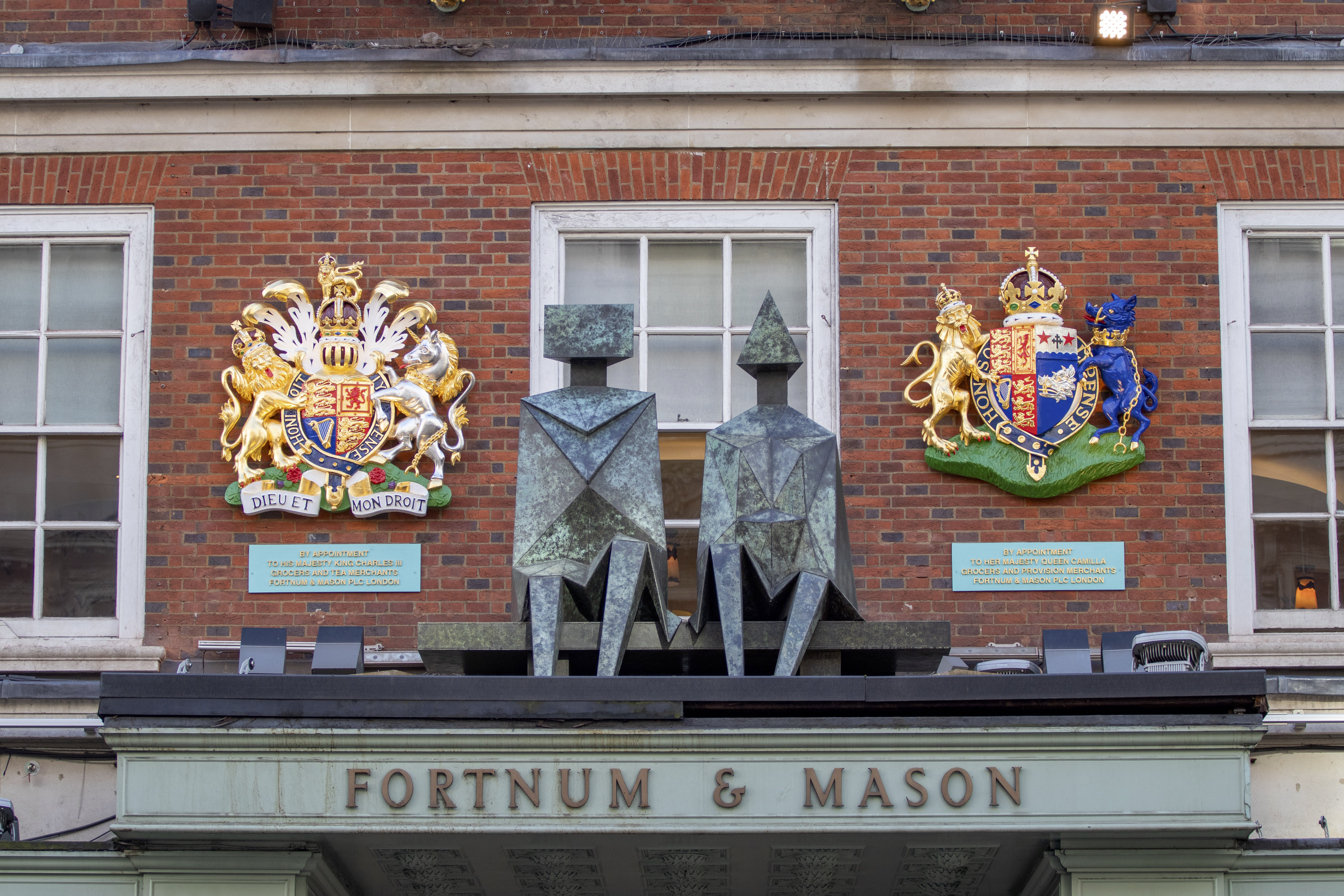
Lynn Chadwick, ‘King and Queen’, 1990, Bronze. Sited above the entrance to Fortnum and Mason, Piccadilly, London.

In March 2012, Queen Elizabeth II, Camilla (then Duchess of Cornwall) and Catherine (then Duchess of Cambridge) made their first official joint visit to Fortnum & Mason. During this visit, they were each presented with their own personalised hampers. The Queen opened the Diamond Jubilee Tea Salon on the fourth floor.

In November 2013, the company's first additional store was opened at St Pancras International station. The retailer has since opened stores and restaurants at Heathrow Terminal 5 (in 2014) and at The Royal Exchange (in 2018).

Fortnum & Mason opened its first standalone store outside Britain in Dubai on 21 March 2014.

On 4 April 2019, it was announced that Fortnum & Mason would open a Hong Kong store at K11 Musea in September 2019. The 7,000 square-foot space features a retail store and restaurant.

In October 2025, the company opened its first UK store outside of London at Bicester Village, as well as its first ever Fortnum & Mason 'On the Go', a hospitality kiosk offering crumpets and hot drinks.

== Organisation ==
=== Food and drink awards ===
Fortnum & Mason runs an annual food and drinks awards scheme. According to the company's former CEO Ewan Venters, the awards recognise "the pinnacle of high achievement in food and drink across the media". The awards celebrate writers, publishers, presenters, image-makers and personalities working in the food and drink industry.

The 2018 awards ceremony was hosted by Claudia Winkleman and winners included Nadiya Hussain, Nigel Slater and Jay Rayner.

== Royal warrants ==
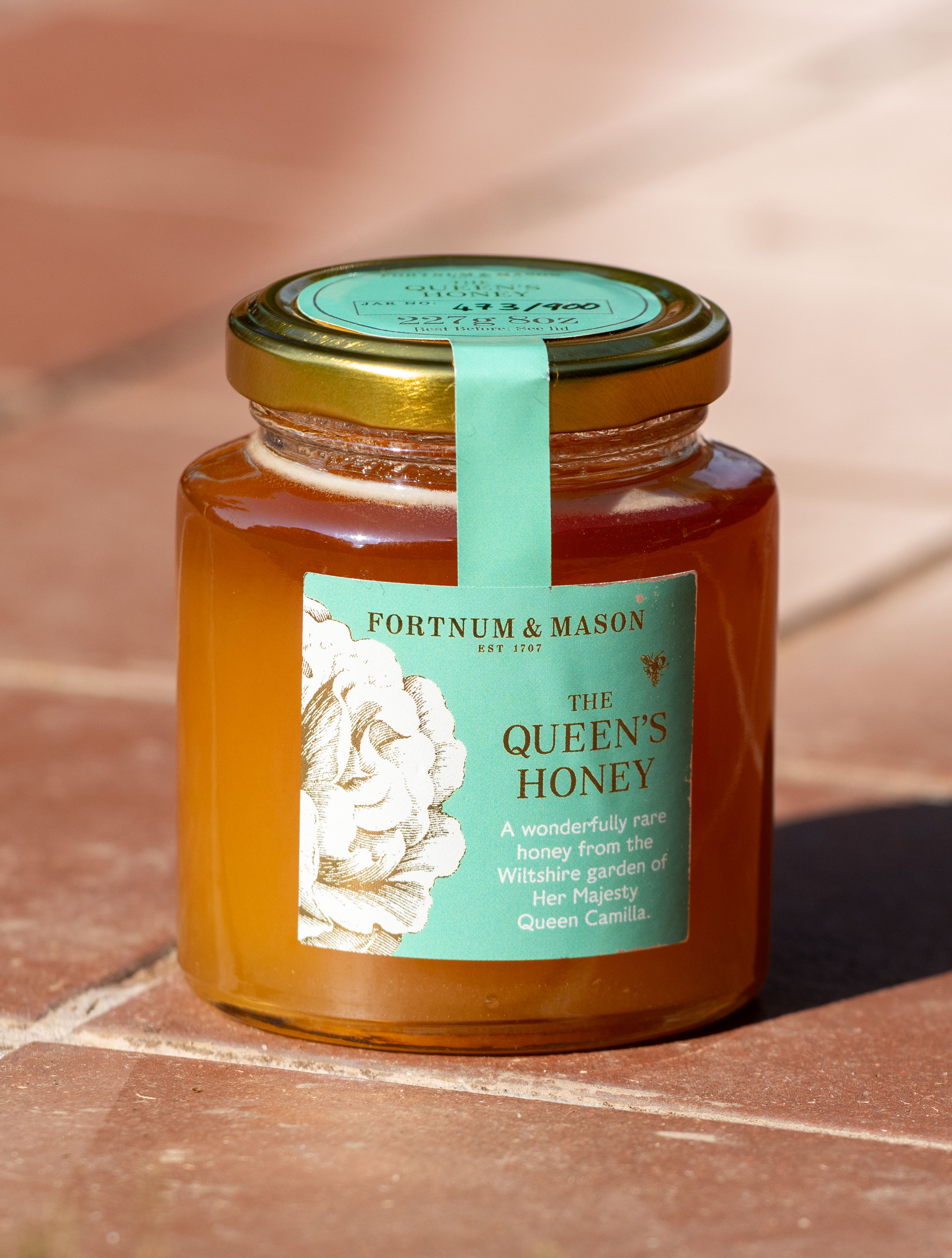
Jar of honey from Queen Camilla's Wiltshire garden

Fortnum & Mason holds two royal warrants, granted by King Charles III and Queen Camilla.

Their first royal warrant was granted in 1910 by Queen Alexandra. Later Royal Warrants were granted to Fortnum & Mason by King George V, though Fortnum & Mason temporarily lost their warrant for his son, King George VI, in 1948, due to post war rationing of the time. The warrant for King George VI was restored in 1951.

Later, King George VI and his consort Queen Elizabeth, known as the Queen Mother after the death of King George VI in 1952, both granted Fortnum & Mason Royal Warrants.

=== Platinum Jubilee ===
In 2022, Fortnum & Mason was a sponsor of the Platinum Pudding Competition, as part of the official celebrations of the Platinum Jubilee of Elizabeth II.

Fortnum & Mason was also one of sixteen partners of the Platinum Jubilee Pageant, held on 5 June 2022.

== Controversies ==
In November 2010, animal rights group PETA UK began a campaign against Fortnum & Mason's sale of foie gras, citing the cruelty in the production process. The group regularly held demonstrations involving celebrities, activists and volunteers outside the store. Celebrities supporting the campaign included Geezer Butler, Sir Roger Moore, Owain Yeoman, Tamara Ecclestone, Bill Oddie, Twiggy and Morrissey. In 2011, Fortnum & Mason was reprimanded by Westminster Trading Standards for misleading customers about its animal welfare standards. As a result, the grocer changed its corporate social responsibility document to state that only UK suppliers are required to adhere to its welfare standards. In December 2020, Fortnum & Mason ceased sale of foie gras in favour of an alternative seen as more ethical, foie royale.

On 26 March 2011, Fortnum & Mason was targeted by the group UK Uncut, who broke off from the main 2011 anti-cuts protest march to target the tax avoidance policies of Associated British Foods, which, like Fortnum & Mason, is owned by Wittington Investments. This took the form of a mass sit-in, with some 138 UK Uncut protesters arrested.

In November 2024 the company caused controversy by not including Paralympians in an after party event, after a reception was held at Buckingham Palace for all Olympic athletes. Many disabled athletes spoke up about how this is a common form of disability exclusion where non disabled athletes are treated better than others.

== In popular culture ==
In Anthony Trollope's novel The Claverings (1867) Sir Hugh Clavering disdains to trust Fortnum & Mason to provision his yachting trip to Norway: "He was not a man to trust any Fortnum or any Mason as to the excellence of the article to be supplied, or as to the price."

Fortnum's history of offering a wide variety of foodstuffs is later referenced in the 1960 Hammer Studios film, The Two Faces of Dr. Jekyll. Set in 1870s London, Mr Hyde quips regarding a lively and risqué London nightspot, "Rather like Fortnum & Mason ... you can buy anything here." In the 2022 film Living (a re-make of the Akira Kurosawa classic Ikiru), the stricken protagonist takes his young companion to lunch at the Fortnum lunchroom, to her astonishment.

In Mary Wesley's novel The Camomile Lawn (1984), Fortnum’s is mentioned as a place to pick up something to eat: "We stocked up at that mini-Fortnums in Tavistock."

In Alan Bennett's 1991 play The Madness of George III (also made into a 1994 film), set in the late 1780s, a footman named Fortnum leaves in a huff to start a "provision merchant's in Piccadilly." This is an anachronistic reference to the founding of the store, as William Fortnum's position as a footman in the royal household was many decades earlier, in the reign of Queen Anne.

== See also ==
- Harrods
- Jenners
