= Wittington Investments =

British & Canadian holding companies

Wittington Investments Limited
- Type: Private
- Industry: Holding company
- Founded: 1941; 85 years ago
- Founder: W. Garfield Weston
- Headquarters: London, England, UK
- Key people: Sir Guy Weston (chairman)
- Revenue: ▼£14.133 billion (2020)
- Total assets: ▲£15.5 billion (2019)
- Owners: Garfield Weston Foundation (79.2%); Weston family (20.8%)
- Subsidiaries: Associated British Foods (54.5%), Fortnum & Mason, Heal's, Wittington Properties
- Website: wittington-investments.co.uk

Wittington Investments is the name of two privately owned holding companies, one based in Britain, the other in Canada. Both companies are controlled by the prominent Weston family. Through these holding companies, the Weston family controls some of the largest businesses in the food industry and retailing on both sides of the Atlantic, including Associated British Foods and Loblaws.

== British company ==
Wittington Investments Limited is a British company that was incorporated in 1941 and is based in London, England. The company is 79.2% owned by the Garfield Weston Foundation, one of the United Kingdom's largest grant-making trusts, which was established in 1958 by Canadian businessman W. Garfield Weston (1898–1978). The remaining 20.8% of the shares are owned by members of the Weston family. As of 5 April 2008, the trustees of the Garfield Weston Foundation valued their 79.2% stake in Wittington Investments at £3.62 billion.

Wittington Investments owns 54.5% of Associated British Foods, one of the largest food companies in the world and the parent company of Primark, the biggest discount clothing chain in the UK and Ireland. Associated British Foods also owns British Sugar, processor of the entire UK beet crop and producer of half the UK consumption of sugar. Further assets include ownership of the British department store Fortnum & Mason, as well as Heal's, a chain of homeware and furnishing stores in the UK.

== Canadian company ==
Wittington Investments, Limited
- Type: Private
- Industry: Holding company
- Founded: 1952; 74 years ago
- Founder: W. Garfield Weston
- Headquarters: 22 St. Clair Avenue East, Toronto, Ontario, Canada
- Key people: Galen Weston Jr.
- Owners: Weston family

Wittington Investments, Limited is a Canadian company that was founded by W. Garfield Weston in 1952 and is based in Toronto, Ontario. It is the majority shareholder in the North American holding company George Weston Limited, which is a part-owner of Choice Properties real estate investment trust and the controlling shareholder in Loblaw Companies Limited, Canada's largest supermarket retailer (with brands such as President's Choice, No Name and Joe Fresh).

In 1963, Wittington's subsidiary, DICOA (Diversified Companies of America), had purchased the controlling share in Howardsgate Holdings (owners of Fine Fare supermarkets and its various grocery brands) from Associated British Foods for $11.7 million after the business lost $3.7 million. Howardsgate Holdings was sold in 1966 to another subsidiary (George Weston Limited), before being sold back to Associated British Foods.

In December 2020, the Weston family announced that Galen Weston Jr. had succeeded his father (Galen Weston Sr.) as the controlling shareholder of Wittington Investments, Limited.

The company was the owner of the Selfridges Group of department store chains, including Selfridges in the UK, Brown Thomas and Arnotts in Ireland, and De Bijenkorf in the Netherlands. In December 2021, it was reported that the majority of the Selfridges Group's assets were being sold for around £4 billion to a joint venture between Thai conglomerate Central Group and Austrian firm Signa Holding.

In 2024, Wittington became a limited partner in Radical Ventures' first US$800-million AI growth fund.

In 2026, Wittington funded a non-profit online publication called Be Giant which would focus on solutions journalism where it covers Canadian entrepreneurs, researchers and innovations that contribute to Canada. The publication was based on discussion in 2025 about Canada’s sovereignty and economic independence after U.S. President Donald Trump threatened to annex Canada.

In October 2026 it was announced in the press that Wittington Investments had started negotiations to purchase the British pharmacy company Boots from its owners Sycamore Partners for £7 billion. On the 7th October, the acquisition was agreed at £6.7 billion, with completion expected in early 2027.
