= Howard Kippenberger =

New Zealand general (1897–1957)

Major General Sir Howard Kippenberger KBE, CB, DSO & Bar, ED
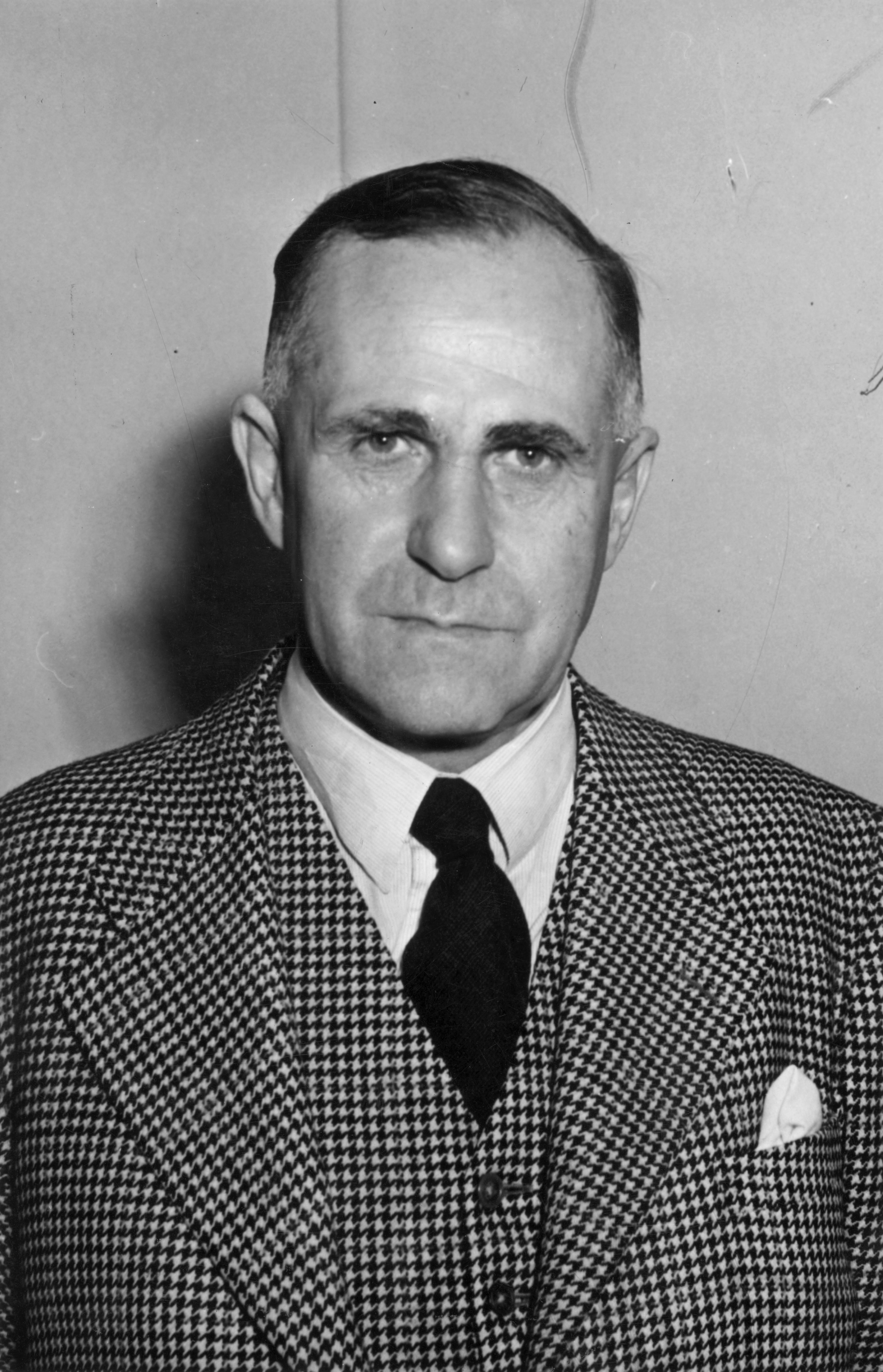
- Portrait of Sir Howard Kippenberger in 1952
- Born: 28 January 1897; Ladbrooks, New Zealand
- Died: 5 May 1957 (aged 60); Wellington, New Zealand
- Military career
- Allegiance: New Zealand
- Branch: New Zealand Military Forces
- Service years: 1915–1917; 1924–1946
- Rank: Major General
- Nickname: "Kip"
- Commands: 2nd New Zealand Division; 5th Infantry Brigade; 10th Infantry Brigade; 20th Battalion
- Conflicts: First World War; Western Front; Second World War; Battle of Greece; Battle of Crete; North African campaign; Italian campaign
- Awards: Knight Commander of the Order of the British Empire; Companion of the Order of the Bath; Distinguished Service Order & Bar; Mentioned in Despatches; Efficiency Decoration
- Other work: Editor-in-Chief, War History Branch

Major General Sir Howard Karl Kippenberger, KBE, CB, DSO & Bar, ED (28 January 1897 – 5 May 1957), known as "Kip", was an officer of the New Zealand Military Forces who served in the First and Second World Wars.

Born in the Canterbury region of New Zealand, Kippenberger joined the New Zealand Expeditionary Force (NZEF) in late 1915. He saw action in France on the Western Front, participating in the Battle of Flers-Courcelette. A serious wound in November 1916 saw him repatriated to New Zealand and discharged from the NZEF. He qualified as a solicitor in 1920 and worked in a legal practice in Rangiora. In 1924, he joined the Territorial Force and by 1936 had advanced in rank to lieutenant colonel.

Following the outbreak of the Second World War, Kippenberger was appointed to command the 20th Battalion. He led the battalion for two years, through the Battles of Greece and Crete as well as part of the North African Campaign before being promoted to brigadier and taking command of the 5th Infantry Brigade. The pinnacle of his military career was as commander of the 2nd New Zealand Division during the Italian Campaign. He was wounded on 3 March 1944 during the Battle of Monte Cassino when he stepped on a land mine. As a result of his wounds, he lost both of his feet. After recovery in England, during which he was fitted with artificial limbs, he helped prepare for and assisted in the repatriation of newly released New Zealand prisoners of war. In 1946, he was appointed Editor-in-Chief of New Zealand's largest-ever publishing project, the Official History of New Zealand in the Second World War 1939–45. He was still working on the project when he died on 5 May 1957 in Wellington.

== Early life ==
Howard Kippenberger was born on 28 January 1897 in Ladbrooks, in the Canterbury region of New Zealand, to Karl and Annie Kippenberger. His unusual surname came from his paternal great-grandparents, who emigrated to New Zealand from Germany in 1863. The oldest of five children, he received his early education at local schools in Ladbrooks and nearby Prebbleton (Kippenberger's father was the headmaster at Prebbleton School). When he was 14, his father became a farmer and moved the family to Oxford. Kippenberger continued his schooling at Christchurch Boys' High School as a boarder. Intellectually advanced for his age, he was not academically challenged at school and misbehaved in class. This, together with a low attendance rate, led to the school authorities asking him to leave high school. Returning home to Oxford, he worked on the family farm.

Always interested in military history, Kippenberger joined the local unit of the New Zealand Cadet Corps and found that he enjoyed soldiering. His father did not approve of his interest but regardless, Kippenberger enlisted in the New Zealand Expeditionary Force (NZEF) in late 1915 at the age of 18. Because only men between the ages of 19 and 45 were required to register for service, he falsified his age to ensure that he would be eligible for duty overseas.

== First World War ==
From January to April 1916, Kippenberger underwent basic training at Trentham Military Camp as part of the 12th Reinforcement of the NZEF. On 1 May, he embarked for Europe to join the New Zealand Division. However, during transit his transport ship was unexpectedly diverted to Egypt. For two months, his contingent was based at the training camp of the Australian Imperial Force at Tel-el-Kebir but had very little to do with only a few hours of training each day. The 12th Reinforcement left in July for Sling Camp in England, where it underwent more intense training.

=== Western Front ===
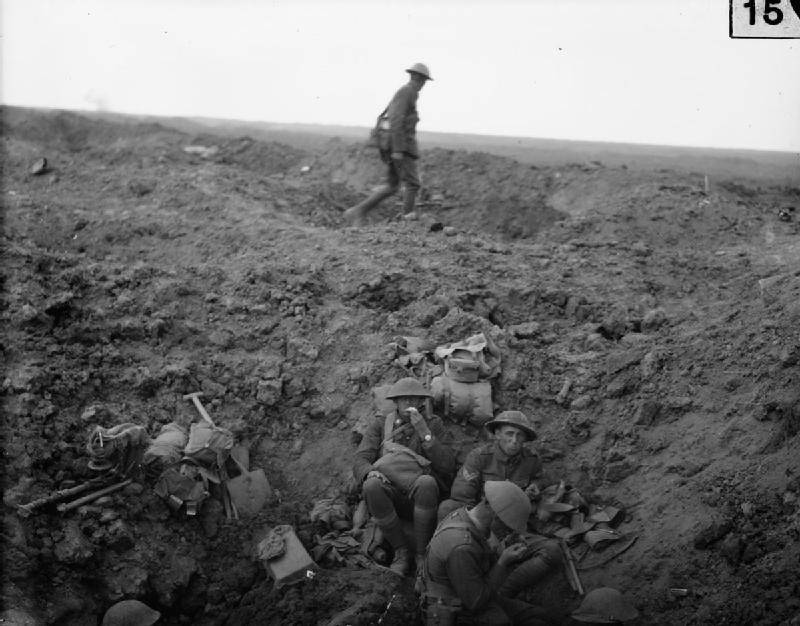
Men of the 2nd Canterbury Battalion, New Zealand Division, rest in a shell hole on the opening day of the Battle of Flers-Courcelette, 15 September 1916

Kippenberger finally arrived on the Western Front in September 1916, as a private in the 1st Battalion, Canterbury Regiment. His arrival at the front coincided with the Somme Offensive. He took part in the Battle of Flers-Courcelette which began on 15 September and remained in the front lines for over three weeks before the regiment was withdrawn. His unit suffered heavy casualties during this time; Kippenberger was one of just five soldiers left in his platoon after the battle ended.

After rest and recovery, the regiment moved to the Fromelles sector of the front in mid-October. Here Kippenberger volunteered for sniper duty despite not being known for his accuracy as a marksman. He served in this capacity until he was badly wounded in the arm by shrapnel on 10 November 1916. Although he eventually recovered from his wound, at the time it was serious enough that he was repatriated to New Zealand and discharged from the NZEF in April 1917.

== Civilian life ==
Kippenberger appreciated the need to establish a career for himself and to this end, decided on a profession in law. In early 1918 he enrolled at Canterbury College to study law and later in the year found a job as a law clerk in a legal practice in Christchurch. Here he met Ruth Isobel Flynn, a secretary, whom he married in 1922. The couple had three children, two sons and a daughter. Working by day, and studying in the evenings, he qualified as a solicitor in 1920. He moved to Rangiora, becoming the manager and then a partner of the Rangiora branch of a Christchurch legal firm.

Kippenberger became immersed in the Rangiora community, serving on the local council and becoming involved in various committees. He also retained an interest in the military and in March 1924, was commissioned in the Territorial Force as a second lieutenant in the 1st Battalion of the Canterbury Regiment. He firmly believed that a large scale conflict would once again occur in Europe, and he wanted to be prepared for this eventuality. Therefore, he built up an extensive military library and studied the theory of warfare and analysed past campaigns to ascertain strategy and tactics for a given situation. He noted the influence of landscape on the outcomes of battles and the qualities of a successful military commander. He even set up a large sand table in his office at his law practice for war gaming. What he would learn from his studies, he put into practice in his training with the Territorials. By July 1936, he held the rank of lieutenant-colonel and was the commanding officer of the 1st Battalion.

== Second World War ==
On the outbreak of the Second World War in 1939, Kippenberger was given command of the 20th Battalion. Formed at Burnham Military Camp in early October, the battalion was to be part of the 2nd New Zealand Division. After a period of training, it departed for the Middle East on 5 January 1940. The battalion arrived at its base in Maadi, Egypt, on 14 February, and was involved in training and garrison duty at Baggush for most of the next 12 months.

=== Greece and Crete ===
Anticipating an invasion of Greece by the Germans in 1941, the British Government decided to send troops to support the Greeks. The 2nd New Zealand Division, under the command of Major General Bernard Freyberg, was amongst the various Allied units dispatched to Greece in early March. As part of the 4th Infantry Brigade, the 20th Battalion prepared and manned the western edge of the Aliakmon Line, a position Kippenberger was not particularly happy with. He felt the defensive line allocated to his battalion was too wide to meaningfully defend, and he took care to reconnoiter avenues of retreat from his positions. On 6 April, the expected German invasion began and they advanced so rapidly a threat to Florina Gap became apparent. The 4th Infantry Brigade, in danger of being outflanked, was withdrawn to the Servia Pass where it manned defensive positions much superior to its previous positions.

The German attack commenced on 14 April and the brigade defended its position for three days before being withdrawn. Kippenberger's battalion was chosen to be the rearguard and he personally intervened in the demolition of bridges and culverts through Servia Pass to ensure that as many stragglers as possible were collected. He and some of his demolition party later came under artillery and tank fire as they attempted to catch up with the main body of the brigade, and were forced to abandon their vehicles and rejoin the battalion on foot. After conducting further delaying actions on the road leading into Athens, Kippenberger and his command were evacuated to Crete on 28 April.

On Crete, Kippenberger was promoted to temporary colonel and given command of the 10th Brigade, an ad hoc formation, which included a 750-man composite battalion consisting mainly of artillery and Army Service Corps men (sans most of their heavy equipment and trucks), New Zealand Divisional Cavalry, some machine gunners and two Greek regiments (although Kippenberger assessed the Greek units to be of limited use). His 20th Battalion was also part of the brigade but strict controls were in place around its deployment and use.

When the Germans launched the invasion of Crete on 20 May, Kippenberger, like most of the defenders of the island, was surprised at the sight of hundreds of Fallschirmjäger (paratroopers) descending under parachutes. He quickly recovered and was making his way to his headquarters, when a burst of gunfire from a paratrooper was directed his way. After twisting his ankle in avoiding the gunfire, he stalked and killed the paratrooper with a shot to the head. His brigade was positioned east of Maleme airfield, on the Galatas plains. It was well placed to counterattack scattered paratroopers who were beginning to consolidate into a good starting position from which an attack on the airfield could be launched. His request to do so was denied by the acting divisional commander, Brigadier Edward Puttick. An attack launched later without Kippenberger's knowledge failed although he believed the outcome could have been different if his troops had been involved.

For most of the remaining days of the battle, a series of attacks and counterattacks were launched. The 10th Brigade had been made subordinate to the 4th Infantry Brigade, although Kippenberger remained in command of the forward troops of the brigade around the town of Galatas. For the next few days, he was instrumental in maintaining defensive discipline of the forward troops, most of whom were not trained infantry. When Galatas fell to the Germans on 25 May, he quickly planned, led and executed a successful counterattack to recapture the town. Despite this notable success, it was short-lived as the brigade had to withdraw to a shorter defensive line and the town was abandoned. Kippenberger joined up with the 20th Battalion as it gradually retreated to Sphakia, on the south coast of the island, from where it was to be evacuated to Egypt. On arrival at Sphakia he had to select a number of his men to remain as a rearguard while the rest of the battalion was evacuated on 30 May. Much to his pleasure, the rearguard that he thought he had had to abandon on Crete was able to follow the next day.

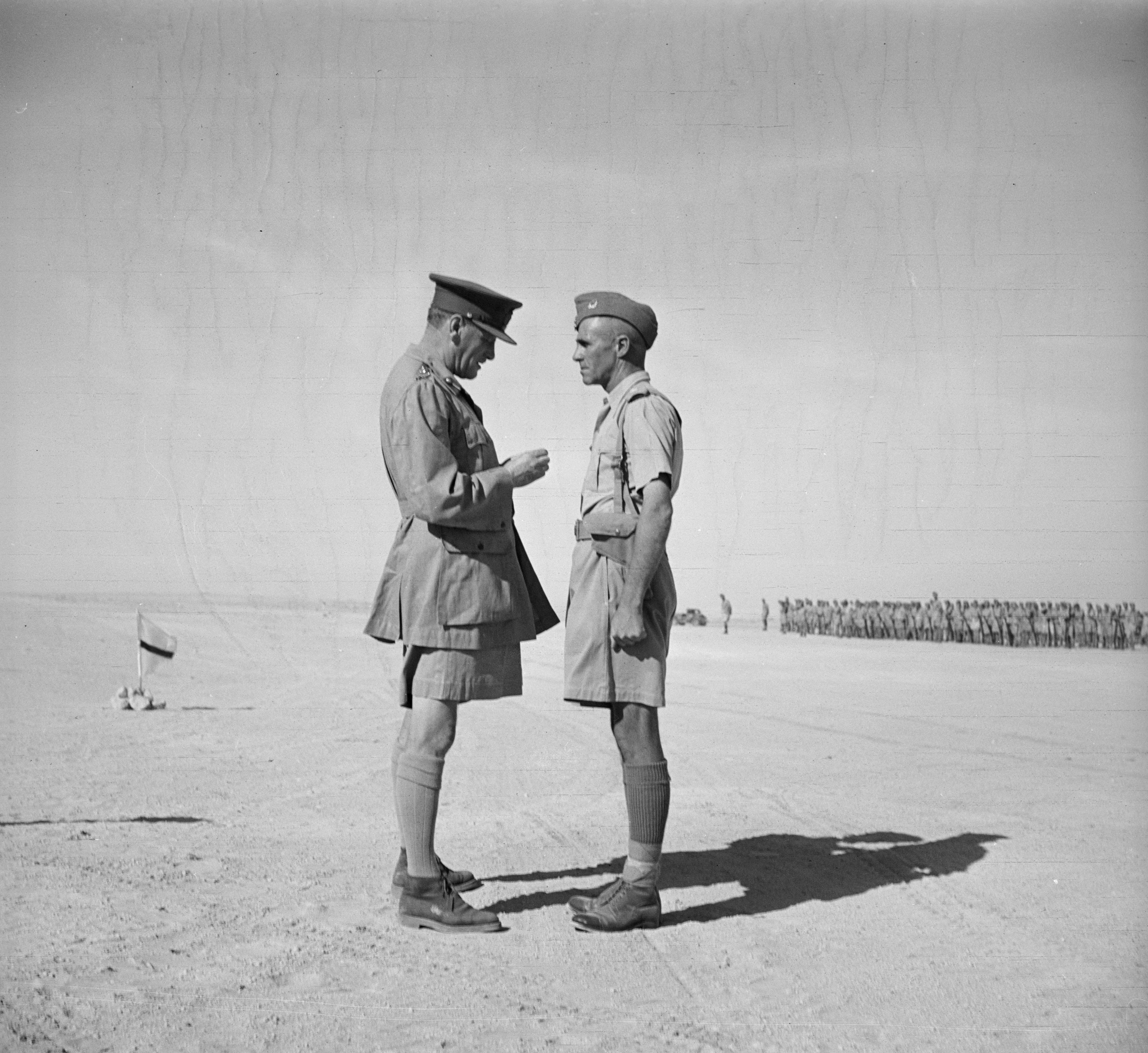
In Egypt on 4 November 1941, General Auchinleck presented Kippenberger with the Distinguished Service Order (DSO) for his leadership during the Battle of Crete

As a result of his actions in Greece and Crete, Kippenberger had forged a reputation for himself as one of the leading officers of the 2nd Division. His brigade commander, Puttick, recommended him for leadership of an infantry brigade although for the time being he would remain commander of the 20th Battalion. Later in the year, he would be awarded a Distinguished Service Order (DSO) for his leadership during the Battle of Crete.

=== North Africa ===
Back in Egypt, and after a short period of rest, Kippenberger set about rebuilding the battalion, which had lost over half its original complement. Nearly 400 replacements joined the battalion and stragglers continued to arrive for several weeks as they made their way across the Mediterranean in small sailboats. By mid-June, it was back up to strength. Several weeks were spent at the battalion's previous positions at Baggush, engaged in intensive desert training.

==== Operation Crusader ====
In November 1941, the 2nd Division participated in Operation Crusader and conducted offensive operations towards the Sidi Azeiz area. Kippenberger enjoyed early successes in this campaign, with his battalion engaged in several battles. At one stage, he responded to an attack in the battalion's rear with a frontal assault resulting in the capture of 300 prisoners. Later on the night of 25 November, along with the 18th Battalion, he was tasked with the night-time capture of Belhamed, a hill adjacent to Sidi Rezegh. As the units moved to its positions, he made a navigational error which resulted in his headquarters company becoming separated from the other companies of the battalion. It took him until daylight to re-establish contact with the remainder of the battalion which, when he located it, was in its expected position having taken the hill with few losses. He was wounded by machine gun fire when he carelessly exposed himself while assessing the battalion's situation. Evacuated to a dressing station, he was captured by elements of the 15th Panzer Division three days later. Still on Belhamed, the 20th Battalion was destroyed in a counterattack, an action observed by a distressed Kippenberger through field glasses.

The dressing station was now under the guard of Italians, the Germans having moved on. The Italians began to send the captive senior officers to prisoner of war camps in Italy, a fate Kippenberger wanted to avoid. On 4 December, he, with a party of 20 others, was able to discreetly abscond from the station by stealing a truck. Making his way back to Baggush, he ran into a group of armoured cars which forced the truck to a stop. To his relief, the armoured cars proved to be those of a South African unit. On reaching Baggush, he met up with Freyberg, who was extremely pleased to see him and promptly promoted Kippenberger to brigadier and command of the 5th Infantry Brigade on the spot; the brigade's previous commander, Brigadier James Hargest, had been captured during a German counteroffensive. While in Baggush, Kippenberger also convinced his superiors to send a unit back to the dressing station to rescue the remaining prisoners. For his work during the campaign, Kippenberger was mentioned in despatches.

The 5th Brigade consisted of the 21st, 22nd and 23rd Battalions. With the Maori Battalion frequently attached to his command, the brigade numbered 5,000 personnel. It was regarded as a substandard formation by the other brigades of the division, and Kippenberger set about rectifying this. While the rest of the 2nd Division moved to Syria, he and his brigade remained in Baggush, and worked on defensive fortifications for several months. In April, the brigade moved to Syria to complete the 2nd Division.

==== El Alamein ====
Two months after Kippenberger's brigade arrived in Syria, Panzer Army Afrika attacked into Libya. This prompted the recall of the 2nd New Zealand Division. The Eighth Army was defeated at the Battle of Gazala and retreated into Egypt. The recalled New Zealanders manned a defensive position at Minqar Qaim, and rebuffed several attacks. However, it was not long before the division was cut off. It successfully forced a breakout with minimal losses on 27 June and withdrew to new positions at El Alamein. On 14 July 1942, during the First Battle of El Alamein, Kippenberger led the 5th Brigade in what would be known as the Battle of Ruweisat Ridge. Ruweisat Ridge was held by the enemy and was in the centre of the El Alamein line, dominating the surrounding area. The 5th Brigade was tasked with the capture of the centre of the ridge. The 4th Brigade was to take the western end of the ridge and the 5th Indian Brigade the eastern end. British armour, in the form of two armoured brigades, was to protect the flanks and be in support to deal with the expected counterattack. However, little thought was given to communication and liaison between the infantry and armoured brigades, nor was a clear chain of command established. This would have implications for the outcome of the battle.

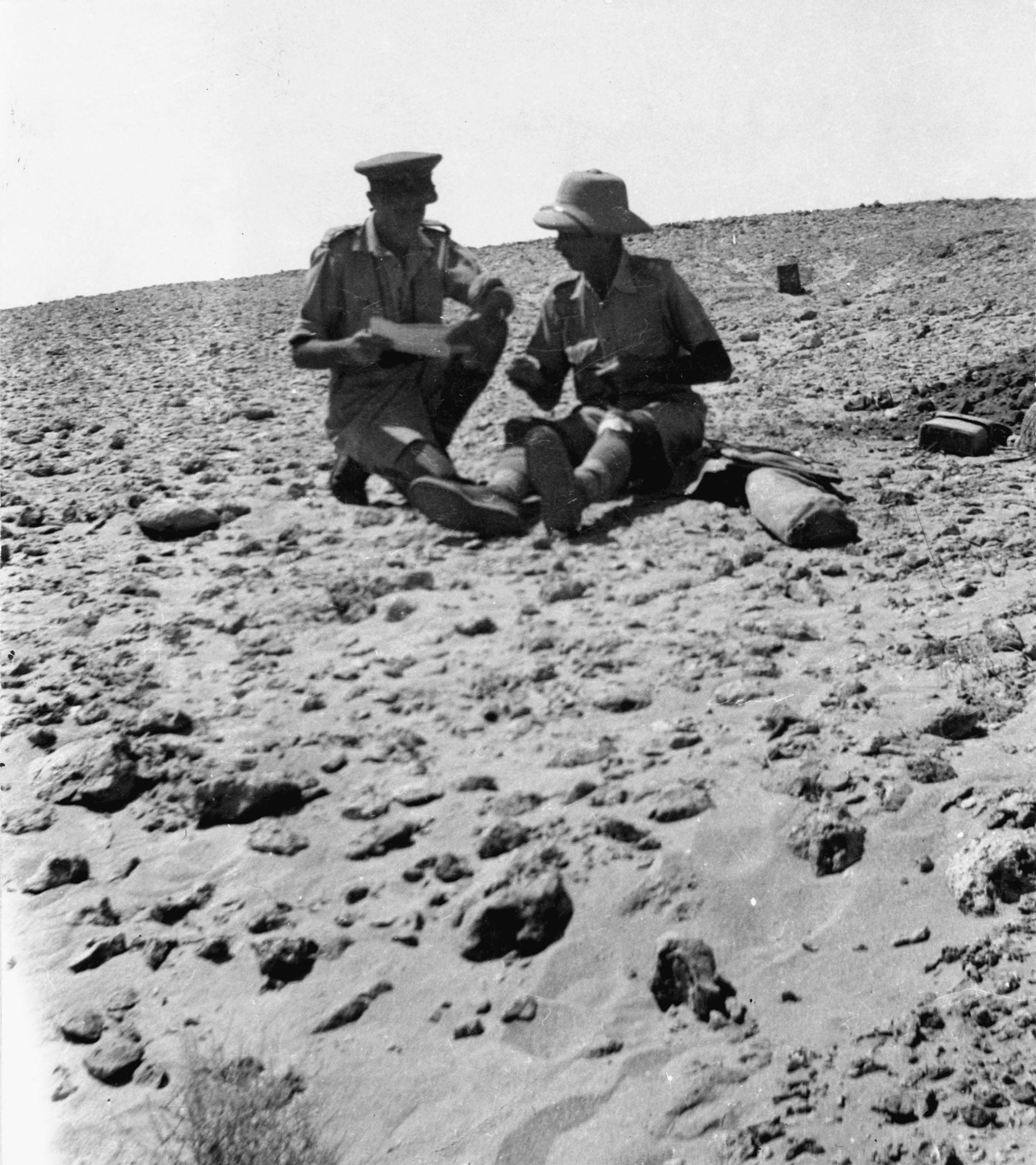
Kippenberger (left) and Lieutenant Colonel Sam Allen, the commander of the 21st Battalion, July 1942

Kippenberger's attack required a night-time advance of six miles (9.7 km) across a front of 1,000 yards (910 m). He decided to have two battalions, the 21st and 23rd Battalions, attack across this front, with the 22nd Battalion in reserve. Artillery and anti-tank units would follow at daybreak. However, he not only decided to use unreliable short-range radios but also failed to make it clear to the inexperienced commander of the 21st Battalion, Lieutenant Colonel Sam Allen, that it was not expected to cover the whole frontal advance. During the advance, the elements of the battalion were spread so far apart that they lost cohesion and bypassed numerous strong points, leaving the German line in front of the ridge largely intact.

In the morning, the supporting British armour was nowhere to be seen and the artillery and anti-tank units were unable to break through, leaving the two New Zealand brigades in position on the exposed ridge. Kippenberger inspected the brigade's position and found his battalions under fire from German tanks. Unable to contact nearby units by radio and realising the degree to which his men were exposed, he raced off under fire in a Bren carrier to locate the British armour. Coming across an armoured brigade four miles away, he implored its commander to bring his unit forward but was refused meaningful support until the intervention of Major General Herbert Lumsden, commander of the British 1st Armoured Division. By the time the tanks had arrived, the men of the 22nd Battalion had been largely killed or captured. The headquarters element of the 23rd Battalion were also prisoners of war. By nightfall, the 4th Brigade had been overrun. Kippenberger asked for and received permission to withdraw his brigade from the ridge. Although awarded a Bar to his DSO for his dash for help from the British, Kippenberger was bitter about the poor planning of the operation and admitted his own errors of judgement.

On the opening day of the Second Battle of El Alamein, Kippenberger led his brigade, which had spent much of the previous weeks in defensive lines, in an attack on Miteirya Ridge during which it achieved all of its objectives. In contrast to three months earlier at Ruweisat Ridge, he took care to establish his headquarters as far forward as possible prior to the commencement of the battle to minimise communication difficulties with the units of the brigade. Despite this, he still lost contact with the leading 23rd Battalion which quickly overwhelmed its opposition. In fact, the battalion had advanced so quickly that it arrived at its final objective so far ahead of schedule that it believed it had only reached its first objective and so advanced even further. The battalion's commander blamed his unit's eagerness for a rapid advance on Kippenberger's inspirational pre-battle speech which particularly enthused his men.

==== Tunisia and home leave ====
As the Afrika Korps retreated into Libya and Tunisia, the 2nd Division, as part of X Corps, was in pursuit. A series of engagements with the enemy followed, occupying Kippenberger and his men. After the battle at Takrouna, the 5th Brigade was withdrawn from the frontlines, having lost 38% of its strength. He remained a highly regarded officer, deputising as commander of the 2nd Division in Freyberg's occasional absence from the field in higher commands.

By July 1943, it was decided to send a group of 6,000 long serving veterans of the NZEF to New Zealand for three months leave. Kippenberger was the ranking officer of the group, and with a high public profile due to his exploits in Crete and North Africa, he spent much of his leave in extensive speaking engagements. He became very rundown and was seriously ill in September, when he was originally expected to return to Egypt. He did not return to command the 5th Brigade until November.

=== Italy ===
At this stage of the war, the 2nd New Zealand Division was fighting in Italy as part of the British Eighth Army with the 5th Brigade poised to attack across the Sangro River in central Italy. On his arrival, Kippenberger conducted a survey of the terrain and recommended to Freyberg that the attack plan be modified to include an additional brigade, a recommendation Freyberg concurred with. The reorganised attack was successfully executed on the evening of 28 November with light casualties. The 2nd Division then attempted three times to capture the town of Orsogna. The second attack on the town of 7 December was the first to involve the 5th Brigade. Despite Kippenberger's brigade achieving all its objectives on the flank of the town, the attack was not successful. The failure of another brigade, tasked with capture of Orsogna itself, to achieve its goals left elements of the 5th Brigade exposed, and it had to partially withdraw.

A further attack involving the 5th Brigade was mounted on 14 December, and this also failed, despite armoured support. Kippenberger found the close fighting in the mountainous terrain in Italy to be in marked contrast to the open campaign of the deserts of North Africa. Despite this, he remained the best of the brigadiers of the division and was not afraid to voice his concerns when given difficult orders by his superiors. When the commander of British XIII Corps, Lieutenant General Miles C. Dempsey, ordered what Kippenberger regarded to be wasteful attacks on ground in front of the 5th Brigade, he was not pleased and twice voiced his concerns.

In early 1944, Freyberg was made commander of the New Zealand Corps, newly formed for the Battle of Monte Cassino, while Kippenberger was promoted to temporary major-general and made commander of the 2nd Division. This was the pinnacle of his military career. The division had moved into the line around Cassino, replacing the U.S. 36th Infantry Division, which had been attacking the strongly defended German positions. The first attack by the New Zealanders on 17 February was unsuccessful despite the bombing of the Monte Cassino abbey, which Kippenberger supported. A second attack was planned for 20 February, but it was delayed by bad weather. On 2 March, Kippenberger climbed the slopes of nearby Mount Trocchio to gain an overview of the Cassino battlefield. Near the top of the mountain, he triggered a land mine which exploded and injured both legs to the extent that one foot was severed in the blast. He was evacuated to a medical centre, and the other foot and the lower portions of both legs were amputated. When the news of his injuries spread to the men of the 2nd New Zealand Division, it was met with some disbelief and shock, greatly affecting morale.

=== England ===
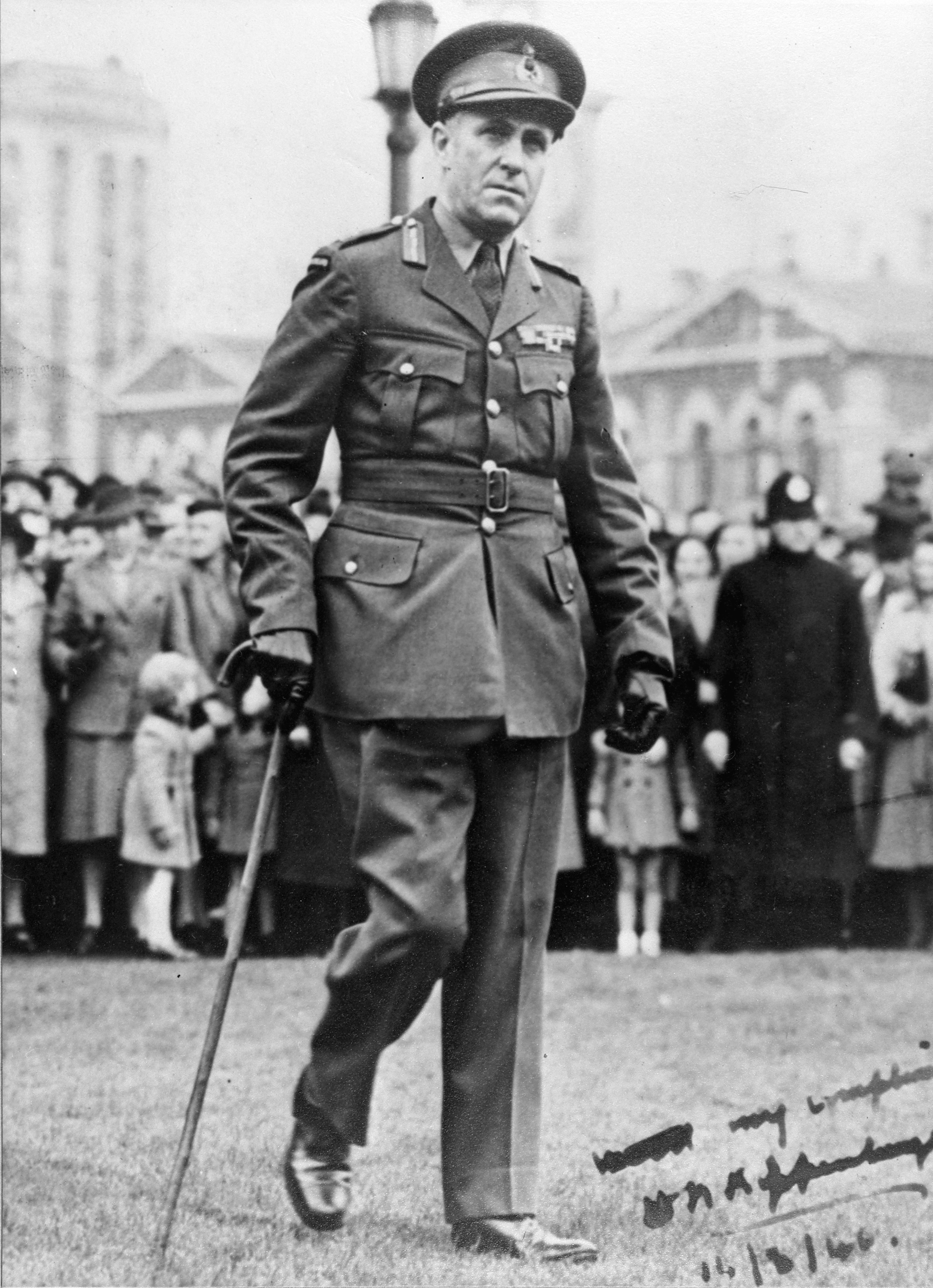
Major-General Kippenberger, in 1946

In April, Kippenberger was transferred to Queen Mary's Hospital in London to be fitted with artificial limbs. He was discharged from hospital in early September after a four-month period of convalescence. His wartime services were recognised that same month by being made a Commander of the Order of the British Empire and in December he was appointed a Companion of the Order of the Bath.

Graded by a medical board as only being fit for administrative duties, Kippenberger still harboured hopes of returning to the 2nd Division. However, he was named to replace Brigadier James Hargest, who had been killed in France in August, as commander of the New Zealand Reception Group. This organisation had been formed to arrange accommodation as well as social and medical services for New Zealand military personnel who were expected to be released from prisoner of war camps in Germany when the war ended. These personnel were to be evacuated to England to await repatriation to New Zealand. It was recognised that transition from the harsh life as a captive to normal life may be difficult for some, and the Reception Group provided much needed support for these individuals. He threw himself into his new role, setting up facilities and accommodation centres around Dover. The first former prisoners of war began arriving in late March 1945, and Kippenberger made it a point to personally meet with each group of arrivals. By the following October, the overwhelming majority of released personnel had been returned to New Zealand, negating the need for the Reception Group.

== Later life ==
In 1945, Kippenberger was offered the position of Editor-in-Chief of New Zealand's largest-ever publishing project, the Official History of New Zealand in the Second World War 1939–45. The New Zealand government had made initial plans for a published record of New Zealand's involvement in the war as early as 1943. Kippenberger, well respected across all branches of New Zealand's services, was championed by New Zealand's prime minister, Peter Fraser, as the person to coordinate the project. The resulting series of books, covering campaign and unit histories as well as volumes on the New Zealand people at war, was to be published by the War History Branch at the Department of Internal Affairs. By 1946, his work with the Reception Group was largely complete and he returned to New Zealand to take up his new position. Initially contracted for seven years from 1 July 1946, he would be involved with the project for the rest of his life. In his capacity as Editor-in-Chief, he guided the planning and production of volumes dedicated to specific campaigns, units and the war effort in general.

Kippenberger set a high standard for the official histories. He disavowed any censorship and diligently read every draft of every volume produced under his editorship, providing extensive, but constructive, feedback to the authors. He took special interest in the unit history of his former command, the 20th Battalion. He stressed the need for objectivity but struggled with his own views on battles in which he had been personally involved. The volume on the Battle of Crete proved to be particularly difficult to produce, requiring critical analysis of the leadership of some of his personal friends during the battle. Leslie Andrew, former commander of the 22nd Battalion, was one who took offence at the account of his handling of the battle.

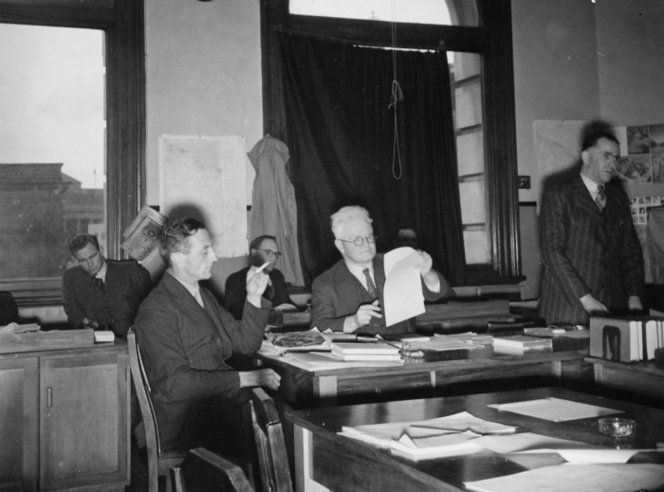
A conference held on 5 July 1946 at the War History Branch, Wellington, in relation to the unit histories. Kippenberger is standing on the right

The official histories had on occasion been threatened with political interference, particularly with the change in government in 1949. Kippenberger, a person of high standing with both the government and the ordinary New Zealander, was a strong advocate for the project, and was able to convince the new government of the merits of the official histories. Kippenberger encouraged a positive atmosphere at the War History Branch, despite a tight budget and at times crowded work conditions. He was proud of its rate of output, which exceeded the efforts of the better resourced official histories of Australia and Great Britain. By 1963, the War History Branch he had presided over for much of its life had produced nearly 50 major volumes.

Kippenberger also found the time to write his own book, Infantry Brigadier, an account of his wartime service. It was a work that began in 1944, as he worked with the Reception Group and it was largely complete by late 1946. Published in 1949 by Oxford University Press, it proved to be a critical and commercial success and was translated into seven languages. When first appointed Editor-in-Chief of the official histories, he had intended to write one or two volumes. He still had hopes of doing so in 1955 when negotiating an extension to his contract with the War History Branch but this never eventuated.

In the 1948 King's Birthday Honours, Kippenberger was appointed a Knight Commander of the Order of the British Empire. The same year, he was also elected Dominion President of the Royal New Zealand Returned and Services' Association (RSA), a position he would hold until 1955. While serving as RSA president, he courted controversy by his outspoken opposition to the All Blacks tour of South Africa in 1949, on the basis of the exclusion of Maori players from the team. While forced to apologise for his remarks, he received much support from Maori veterans. In 1953, Kippenberger was awarded the Queen Elizabeth II Coronation Medal.

In April 1957, his wife's health deteriorated and she was hospitalised. Although seriously ill, she recovered sufficiently to be moved home. On 4 May 1957, while preparing for his wife's homecoming, Kippenberger complained of a headache and then collapsed. Taken to hospital in a coma, he died the next day of a cerebral haemorrhage. He was buried on 7 May at Karori Cemetery in Wellington with full military honours. Ruth Kippenberger watched the funeral procession of her husband from her hospital window; she died ten years later.

== Legacy ==
After his death, Kippenberger's extensive library was purchased by the New Zealand Army. He was a keen reader of military studies, annotating many of the books in the margins as he read them. His notes give an insight into his thinking on warfare and strategy. His collection is housed in the Kippenberger Research Library, in the QEII Army Memorial Museum, Waiouru, together with other books covering a wide range of military subjects, with an emphasis on all major wars involving New Zealanders.

In 2006 the Victoria University of Wellington announced the creation of the Sir Howard Kippenberger Chair in Strategic Studies. It receives support from the Garfield Weston Foundation and provides support for the holder of the chair to teach undergraduates and conduct research into strategic studies. The New Zealand Army operates what is known as the Kippenberger Scheme. It allows officer cadets based at Linton Military Camp, near Palmerston North, the chance to study at Massey University before becoming commissioned.
