= Garfield Weston Foundation =

British charitable organization

- Formation: 1958; 68 years ago
- Founder: W. Garfield Weston
- Type: Charitable organisation
- Headquarters: London
- Region served: United Kingdom
- Methods: Grantmaking
- Fields: Arts, Community, Education, Environment, Faith, Health, Museums & Heritage, Welfare and Youth
- Key people: Guy Weston, Chairman of the Board of Trustees
- Disbursements: ~£100 million annually
- Endowment: £8.62 billion (2024)
- Website: www.garfieldweston.org

The Garfield Weston Foundation is a grant-giving charity based in the United Kingdom. It was established in 1958 by Canadian businessman W. Garfield Weston (1898–1978), who during his lifetime contributed to numerous humanitarian causes, both personally and through his companies. His philanthropic works continue through the Garfield Weston Foundation in London and the Weston Family Foundation in Toronto, Ontario, Canada.

== Finance ==
The Garfield Weston Foundation is one of the wealthiest charitable foundations in the world, with assets of £9.7 billion at 5 April 2017, of which a majority was attributed to the foundation's majority holding in Wittington Investments.

Cumulative total grants reached £960 million in 2017 and £1.5 billion in 2026, increasing at around £100 million per year.

== Chairmen ==
1. W. Garfield Weston (1958–1975)
2. Garry Weston (1975–2000)
3. Sir Guy Weston (since 2000)

== Projects ==
The Garfield Weston Foundation gave Oxford University £25 million for the refurbishment of the New Library (built originally in the 1930s as part of the Bodleian Library), which re-opened to the public in March 2015 as the Weston Library.

The foundation has given grants to a number of schools, including St Michael's Primary School and Brackenbury Primary School for new classrooms and outdoor play areas for sport, and has given grants to Baker Dearing Educational Trust which promotes university technical colleges.

In 2019 the foundation gave £5 million towards the £31 million restoration of the walled garden at RHS Bridgewater in Salford, Greater Manchester.

== Controversies over political donations ==
In 2010, the Charity Commission found that between 1993 and 2004 the charity had given donations to the UK Conservative Party that totalled £900,000, which were in breach of UK charity law; as were similar donations to the economically liberal think tank the Centre for Policy Studies, and to Eurosceptic European political lobby groups such as the European Foundation and the Labour Euro-Safeguards Campaign.

== See also ==
- Garfield Weston Merit Scholarships for Colleges
- Weston family
