= W. Garfield Weston =

Canadian businessman and philanthropist (1898-1978)

W. Garfield Weston OC

Member of Parliament for Macclesfield
- In office 22 November 1939 – 5 July 1945
- Preceded by: John Remer
- Succeeded by: Arthur Vere Harvey

Personal details
- Born: Willard Garfield Weston; 26 February 1898 Toronto, Ontario, Canada
- Died: 22 October 1978 (aged 80) Toronto, Ontario, Canada
- Resting place: Mount Pleasant Cemetery, Toronto
- Party: Conservative
- Spouses: Reta Lila Howard (m. 1921; died 1967) Margarita Martin Montoya (m. 1972)
- Children: 9, including Garry and Galen
- Parent(s): George Weston; Emma Maud Richards
- Relatives: Weston family

Military service
- Allegiance: Canada
- Branch/service: Canadian Expeditionary Force
- Years of service: 1917–1919
- Rank: Sapper
- Battles/wars: World War I

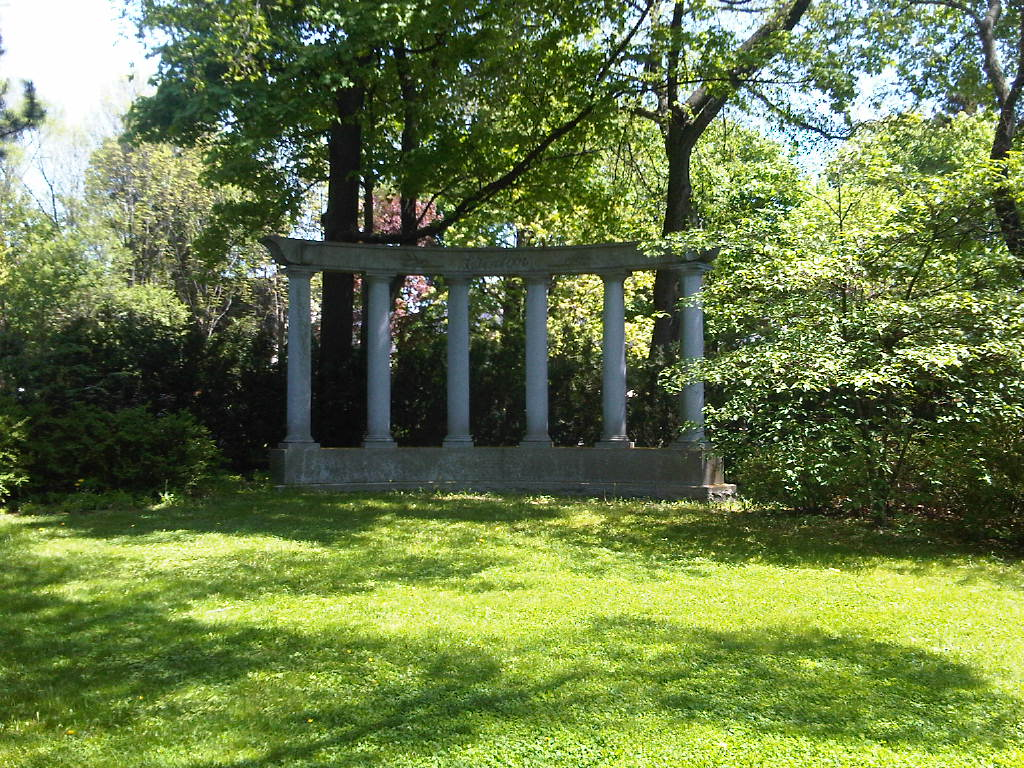
Weston's monument at Mount Pleasant Cemetery, Toronto

Willard Garfield Weston OC (26 February 1898 – 22 October 1978) was a Canadian businessman and philanthropist who was a member of the prominent Weston family. He led George Weston Limited and its various subsidiaries and associated companies, including Associated British Foods, for half a century and established one of the world's largest food processing and distribution concerns. He also served as a Member of Parliament (MP) in the British House of Commons during World War II.

== Early years ==
W. Garfield Weston was born in the apartment above his father's Toronto bread factory in February 1898. He was the son of George Weston and his wife, Emma Maud Richards. Years later, he recounted a family story of how his father took him down to the bakery floor, shortly after his birth, to put him "in the smell of bread."

In 1917, weeks before turning nineteen, Weston joined the Canadian Expeditionary Force to fight in World War I. A year earlier, he had quit school to join up, but his father refused to give his consent – the legal age of enlistment being nineteen at the time. In the interim, he was put to work in George Weston's biscuit factory, cleaning and repairing the equipment. While in uniform overseas, Weston toured the world-famous British biscuit factories and became convinced that the same sort of product could be manufactured and marketed in Canada.

In 1919, after serving in France as a sapper laying communications lines at the front, Weston returned home to take up duties at his father's company. He was eventually promoted to vice president of George Weston Limited and then general manager of the company's biscuit plant. Weston next convinced his father to import biscuit-making equipment from England: "He went back to England and not only brought out the best and most modern biscuit-making machinery money could buy, but he hired some of the leading biscuit experts in England, and moved them and their families to Toronto. Then as a further step to ensure absolute uniformity of the product, the Weston firm installed a creamery to produce its own butter."

In 1922, Weston's English Quality Biscuits were launched. They were introduced at that year's Canadian National Exhibition, and the Toronto Daily Star reported long lines of fairgoers waiting to sample the new product.

== Succession ==
With his father's death in 1924, Weston became president of George Weston Limited. Four years later, he took the company public and soon acquired a controlling interest in a Brantford, Ontario, biscuit and confectionery company named William Paterson Limited. Weston next entered the American market, setting up a small Weston's English Quality Biscuits plant near Boston, Massachusetts. But the U.S. venture ended in near disaster after an apparent sabotage campaign by an insider secretly working for the competition.

== Depression ==
In spite of the onset of the Great Depression, Weston continued to expand operations in Canada, often acquiring financially troubled competitors. In 1931, the Independent Biscuit Company of Calgary, Alberta, was bought out, followed by bankrupt Ontario Bakeries, with seven plants, two years later. Weston Bakeries executive Frank Riddell noted years later that it was the company's ability to access credit that made such acquisitions possible:

"No one had any money in those days, but Weston's at least had a good reputation, some assets, and a record of profit. During 1930 and 1931, the company paid out dividends totalling more than $228,000. That record, along with Mr. Weston's salesmanship, enabled us to get a good line of credit. We financed and refinanced in order to expand, and often you could purchase a good deal with relatively little cash and the guarantee of Weston stock."

In 1931, with the world mired in the Great Depression, the price of wheat collapsed and the incomes of Canadian farmers, particularly those in Western Canada, plunged. Weston, with business and family ties to the West, devised a plan to expand international markets for Canadian wheat, then the country's most important export. In spite of a detailed report that advised him to stay out of the British Isles, he proposed to acquire and modernize bakeries there. Those bakeries would then buy Canadian wheat that would produce a better quality of bread for the British public. But Weston found Canadian financial institutions unreceptive. Rejected by the banks, he arranged a meeting with a group of New York speculators and secured a reported $2 million in financing.

Weston's first acquisition was the biscuit division of Mitchell & Muil, a century-old Scottish baker, in 1933. He closed the antiquated plant at Aberdeen and moved production to a new facility with modern equipment at Edinburgh, with the intent of mass-producing a more affordable line of quality biscuits. "He sold fancy biscuits at exactly half the price at which they were sold by the world-famous firms all around him and he coined money." Fifteen months after entering the British market, Weston reported sales equal to the parent Canadian company. He further announced his intention to establish bread and biscuit operations at strategic locations throughout England, Scotland and Ireland:

"Some may wonder why we are going so much into bread. The British Isles, we believe, are a favourable field at present not only for the biscuit business but infinitely more for the baking of good bread. We are being morally and financially supported in a very large move in Great Britain to make better bread. Better bread can only be made in Great Britain by using more Canadian wheat. The objective of our British development in the next few years will be along the line of bread-making."

Within a few years, Weston had acquired a string of biscuit and bread plants in the United Kingdom. In order to manage the growing overseas venture, he moved his family to England in 1935. By 1937, with 15 plants, employing more than 15,000 workers under the Allied Bakeries banner, Weston was being referred to in the Canadian press as "Britain's Biggest Baker". By 1939, he controlled 30 bakeries throughout the British Isles. Meanwhile, Weston operations in the United States were reorganized in 1931 and a biscuit plant established at Passaic, New Jersey. In 1936, the company set up a new Weston's Biscuits factory at Battle Creek, Michigan, and three years later bought out bankrupt Associated Biscuit Co. of Salamanca, New York.

== War ==
In January 1939, months before the outbreak of World War II, 300 members of the Mackenzie-Papineau Battalion, Canadians who had fought on the losing anti-Fascist side in the Spanish Civil War, faced confinement in a French internment camp. On being contacted by Canadian reporter Matthew Halton, Weston donated $5,000 to help pay for their overseas passage home to Canada. The other half of the money was raised through other sources. Weeks later, the first of the ‘Mac-Paps’ arrived in Halifax.

With Great Britain at war with Germany, Weston was elected Conservative Member of Parliament for Macclesfield in the British House of Commons in November 1939. He was quoted in the press on his belief in a strong British Empire. "I am a great believer in bringing the Empire closer together. That's the only way we'll have real understanding and prosperity." By this time, Weston, as chairman and managing director of Allied Bakeries, headed an operation that consisted of 38 plants throughout the United Kingdom.

1940 saw the arrival of the first Canadian soldiers in England, and Weston donated 500 radios after the troops complained of boredom in their camps. Then, in August 1940, following a day of heavy aerial losses during the Battle of Britain, Weston gave £100,000 for the replacement of 16 fighter aircraft The donation received considerable press coverage, promoted by the Ministry of Aircraft Production and fellow Canadian Lord Beaverbrook, in the hope of raising more money through public donations to the "Spitfire Fund." Weston also gave a further cheque of £10,000 to inaugurate the "Tank Fund" in June 1941. During the Blitz, the Nazi aerial bombing campaign, he set up a system of canteens that fed thousands of civilians as they took shelter in the London Underground. He and his family also hosted air service personnel at their estate outside London, providing a place of retreat.

== Post war expansion ==
In 1945, with the defeat of Nazi Germany, Weston left British politics to return home to Canada, where he settled on the West Coast for a time. Although he contemplated semi-retirement, a series of acquisition opportunities presented themselves. During the war, he had acquired Western Grocers, a food wholesaler in Western Canada, and also bought paper manufacturer E.B. Eddy Company Limited of Hull, Quebec, from friend and former Canadian Prime Minister R.B. Bennett. In 1947, Weston was offered a large block of shares in Loblaw Groceterias Co. Limited, one of the country's leading grocery chains, and over the following years acquired controlling interest. Weston next bought control of William Neilson Limited, a leading Toronto chocolate and confectionery maker. He also continued to buy bakeries in Canada and the United States, including the Southern Biscuit Company of Richmond, Virginia, and the Texas Cookie Co. of Fort Worth. By 1948, Canadian press reports described Weston as "the biggest manufacturer of bread in the world, the largest biscuit maker in the British Empire and Canada's largest wholesale grocer."

The post war years saw Weston continue to expand his overseas holdings, including brands such as Ryvita, acquired in 1949. That same year, his British holding company, with 47 subsidiaries in the United Kingdom, established its first bakery units in Australia. Ventures in New Zealand, India, and Rhodesia would follow. On the retail front, Weston bought Fortnum & Mason of London, the high-end grocer and specialty retailer, in 1951. And in 1955, his Allied Bakeries purchased ABC, the Aerated Bread Company, England's second largest chain of eateries, with 164 budget tea shops and restaurants. Meanwhile, ten percent of all bread in Great Britain was baked in Weston plants, while 20 million Weston-made biscuits were eaten daily by the British public.

During the mid-1950s, Weston began developing a chain of British grocery stores under the Fine Fare banner, but early on the venture struggled with losses. In 1961, the chain undertook a major expansion with 130 new stores opened in 15 months. At one point, Weston introduced Canadian management in an attempt to turn the chain around. Ownership was transferred to George Weston Limited but then switched to Associated British Foods. Fine Fare evolved into the largest supermarket chain in Great Britain with some 1,000 stores, and by the 1960s turned profitable. In 1961, Weston also founded a new company, Food and General Holdings Ltd, with which to enter the British flour milling industry for supply to his bread bakeries. He charged two directors to acquire a series of existing businesses to form the new company. They eventually bought about 30 mills, some of which were closed and most were modernised when the name of the new business was changed to Allied Mills Ltd, within the Associated British Foods Group. Under his chairmanship and that of his son, Garry, who took over in 1967, Allied Mills later built a series of new mills to complement the best of the remodelled units with 'state of the art' technology and became one of the leading milling groups in Europe.

Weston's Associated British Foods, successor to Allied Bakeries, also acquired Twinings, the well-known British brand of tea. With business interests throughout the British Empire, Weston also established holdings in South Africa. In 1964, with the apartheid policies of the government there under increasing scrutiny, Weston dismissed concerns over racial tensions as exaggerated and contended that blacks and whites worked together in Weston companies without problem. He was quoted as saying, "every black piccaninny or black mammy can call on the government for solution to any social problem."

On the European continent, Weston secured entry into the West German market with a stake in Deutscher Supermarkt, in spite of a petition signed by thousands of Germans. Weston also won a foothold in the French retail market after indicating to President Charles de Gaulle that he could reduce food prices in the Republic.

In North America, Weston rapidly expanded his holdings, particularly in the retail sector. In 1957, subsidiary Loblaw Companies Limited acquired a large stake in Chicago-based grocer National Tea, with over 700 food stores in the United States. Controlling interest in National followed over the next decade. Weston also continued to acquire retail operations in Canada, including discount and drug stores. Meanwhile, on the resource based side, George Weston Limited bought fish processors British Columbia Packers in 1962 and Connors Brothers of New Brunswick in 1967.

== Foundation ==
In 1959, Weston and his wife, Reta Lila Howard, established the Garfield Weston Charitable Foundation. The foundation adopted a philosophy that since it was the hard work of employees that built a successful Canadian business that its philanthropy should be directed to the benefit of Canadians. One of its first major donations was a $1 million gift to the Banting and Best Institute for diabetes research at the University of Toronto. Around the same time, Weston established a similar foundation in Great Britain. The Weston Family Foundation in Canada and the Garfield Weston Foundation in the United Kingdom maintain that charitable legacy today.

== Disclosure ==
In December 1966, following enquiries by a Canadian parliamentary committee examining consumer prices, George Weston Limited revealed the full extent of its corporate holdings. Organizational charts showed 150 active companies with $2.8 billion in annual sales, $43 million in operating profits, and company assets approaching $800 million, with over 1,800 retail stores and more than 1,500 franchise operations. Press reports described George Weston Limited and subsidiary Loblaw Companies Limited as the fifth largest merchandiser in the world. They further indicated that Garfield Weston, in terms of international holdings, was the second most profitable merchandiser in the world, and the third largest in sales.

As Weston approached his 70th year, it was announced that he was stepping down as Chairman of Associated British Foods in favour of his son Garry Weston, who first took charge of Ryvita in 1951 and then spent more than a decade expanding company operations in Australia. "My main job now is to take the day-to-day operations of the group off my father's shoulders", Garry Weston was quoted at the time. Garfield Weston assumed the new post of ABF President.

== Consolidation ==
By the early 1970s, Weston's North American retail operations were under considerable financial pressure and appeared headed for bankruptcy. With dwindling cash, considerable debt, and supermarket price wars that had cut the company's share of the crucial Ontario market in half, he asked his youngest son, Galen Weston, to take a look at Loblaws to see if it could be saved. In February 1972, he appointed Galen Weston as Chief Executive Officer of Loblaw Companies Limited. An extensive restructuring began, which resulted in hundreds of ageing, unprofitable outlets in Canada and the United States being closed. Those stores that remained were renovated and rebranded. Half of all Loblaws stores in Ontario were eventually shut down, but the company regained market share on the strength of its redesigned supermarkets. In 1974, Weston appointed Galen Weston as Chairman and Managing Director of George Weston Limited. He retained the position of Vice Chairman and President.

In 1976, Loblaw sold off three unprofitable divisions of its National Tea Co. subsidiary in the United States. The sale of its Chicago, Syracuse, and California State supermarkets, or about half its remaining outlets in the U.S., represented the first step in a gradual divestiture of all retail and wholesale operations south of the border. That same year, George Weston Limited recorded its first year-end loss in the company's history. By fiscal 1977, though, both George Weston Limited and Loblaw Companies Limited had returned to profitability.

== Death and legacy ==
In January 1978, Weston was made an Officer of the Order of Canada. In October of that year, he died of a heart attack at the age of 80.

In 1980, Weston was inducted posthumously into the Canadian Business Hall of Fame.

Parliament of the United Kingdom
Preceded by John Remer	Member of Parliament for Macclesfield; 1939–1945	Succeeded by Arthur Vere Harvey
