= PC Mobile =

Prepaid wireless service licensed by the Loblaw Companies

- Industry: Mobile virtual network operator
- Founded: Mid-2005
- Area served: Canada
- Products: Mobile prepaid telephone products and services
- Owner: Bell
- Website: pcmobile.ca

PC Mobile is a licensed white label prepaid wireless service operated in Canada. Its mobile telephone products and services operate on the network infrastructure operated by Bell Mobility and formerly Telus Mobility (the two companies managed one of the service types each with Telus discontinuing the postpaid service in October 2018), but licensed the proprietary branding and payment media with the President's Choice supermarket store brand owned by Loblaws Inc. It also operates mobile phone kiosks in Loblaws banner stores under the name The Mobile Shop.

The postpaid wireless service was owned and operated by Telus while the prepaid service continues to be owned and operated by Bell Mobility.

== History ==
PC Mobile started in mid-2005 as another President's Choice product of Loblaws Inc., although the domain name PCmobile.ca was registered on January 17, 2005. It offered prepaid products and services as a licensed white label of Bell Mobility services in Canada. There are also PC long distance cards sold with competitive international rates. The company originally only sold CDMA feature phones. Various HSPA+ feature phones, Android smartphones and SIM cards were added throughout the early 2010s, as CDMA handset models have been gradually discontinued. In 2013, PC Mobile announced the sale of postpaid phones and monthly services at its full-service The Mobile Shop kiosks. However, the postpaid service was discontinued on October 2, 2018.

== Closure of postpaid division ==
On May 24, 2018, PC Mobile decided to cease its postpaid operation. Although still operating as The Mobile Shop across the country, customers were moved from the PC brand to Koodo Mobile. The venture between Telus still remains for the foreseeable future as well, and it continues to operate and offer postpaid services via all three national carriers and respective flanker brands at its Mobile Shop locations. PC Mobile's exit did not have any effect on its existing plans to expand its own wireless presence. PC Mobile moved existing customers to Koodo on October 2, 2018. This did not affect the prepaid service offered by PC Mobile operated by Bell Mobility however.

== No Name Mobile ==
Starting April 10, 2024, No Frills stores began offering PC Mobile service packaged under their own No Name brand.
