= Loblaw (disambiguation) =

Loblaw is a Canadian retailing conglomerate.

Loblaw, Loblaws, or similar may also refer to:

- Loblaws, a Canadian supermarket brand, originator of the conglomerate
- Bob Loblaw, a fictional character from Arrested Development
- Terri Loblaw (born c. 1958), Canadian curler
- Theodore Loblaw (1872–1933), Canadian grocer and founder of the Loblaw's brand and corporation
