= Value brands in the United Kingdom =

In the United Kingdom, it is common practice for retailers to have their own value brand in an effort to compete on price. These brands have become more popular in the UK with shoppers since the Great Recession caused food prices to rise.

== Major retailers ==
=== Tesco ===
Tesco's value brand was originally launched in 1993 as Tesco Value, with distinctive blue-and-white striped packaging. In April 2012 the range was rebranded as Everyday Value, with new packaging and a revised product range which omitted artificial colours and flavours. The original Tesco Value brand had been launched in the midst of a supermarket price war, and targeted a low price point, with cans of beans costing 3p a can and loaves of bread for 7p.

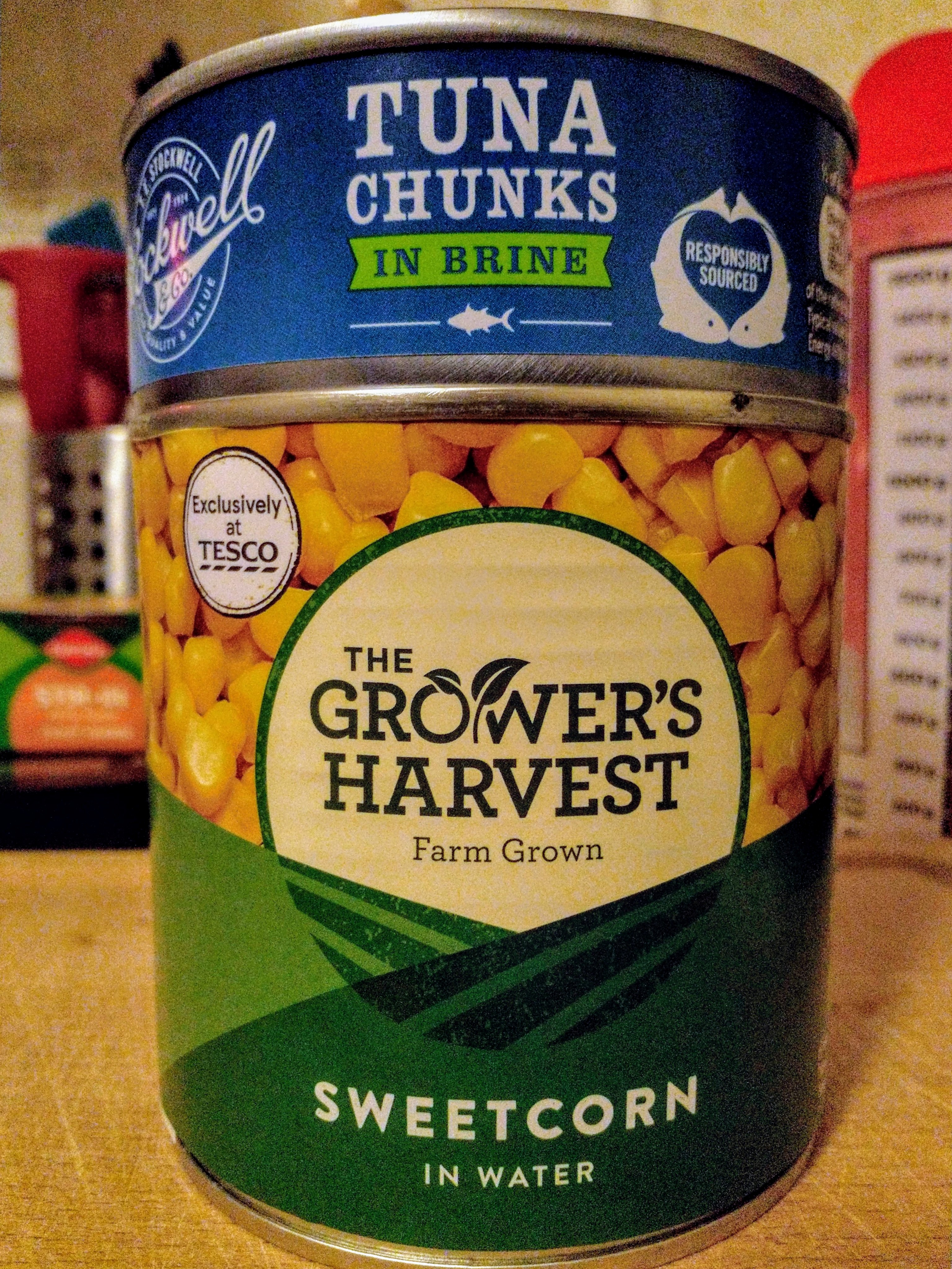
Two cans showing the different branding utilised by Tesco for its "Exclusively at Tesco" range

In 2018 Tesco began phasing out Everyday Value in favour of "tertiary brands" such as "Ms Molly's", "Hearty Food Co." and "Stockwell & Co.", in effect imitating what Aldi and Lidl do and reviving a previous attempt in 2009 known as 'Discount Brands at Tesco'.

In 2023 Tesco released a clothing range featuring the original Tesco Value branding.

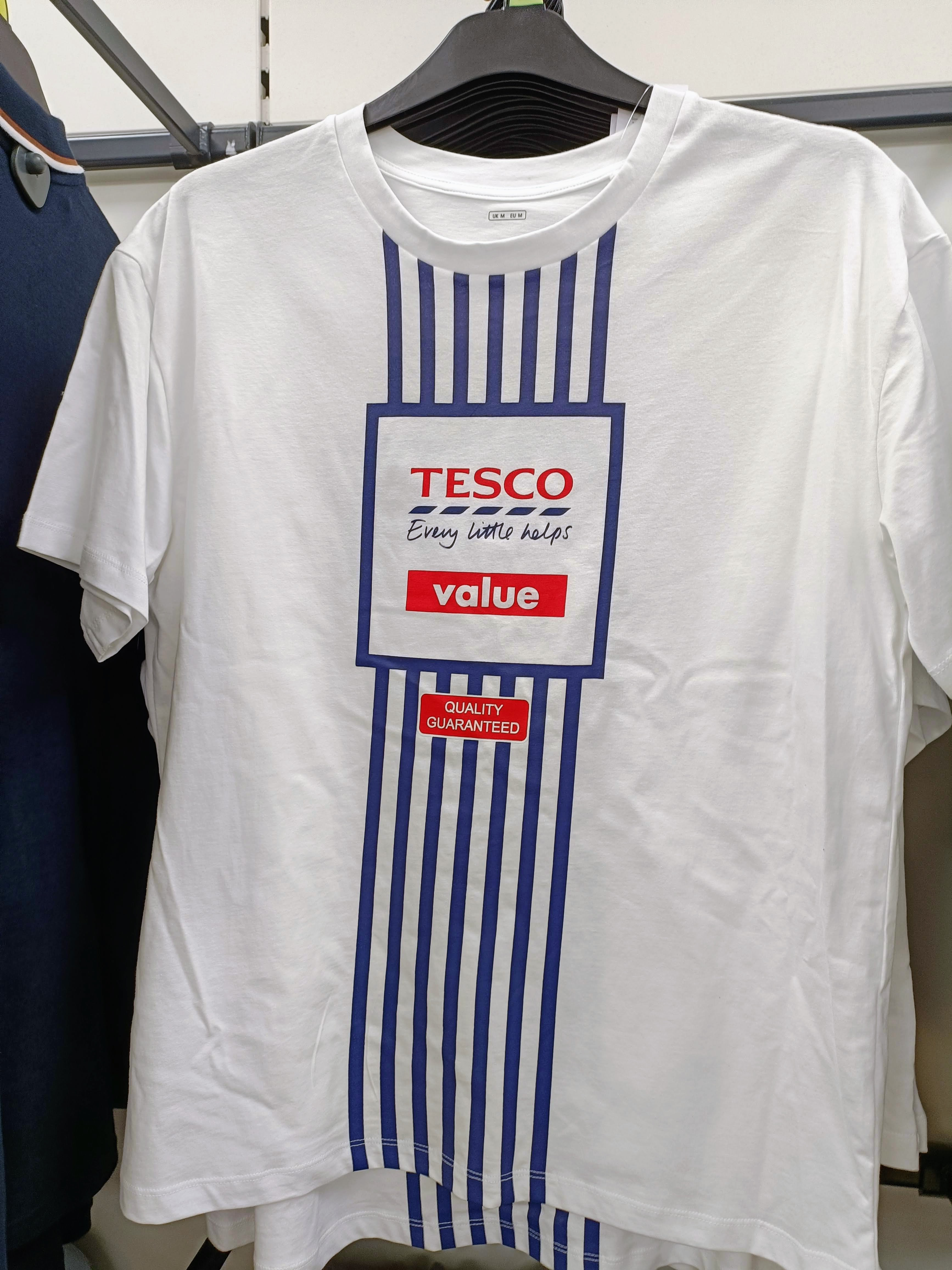
A men's t-shirt available at Tesco, showing the 1990s utilitarian branding use

Brands used:

- Boswell Farms - fresh beef products;
- Butcher's Choice - frozen meat;
- Creamfields - dairy products including milk and cheese;
- Eastman's - pastry products, including pies, sausage rolls and quiche, cooked meats, coleslaw, potato salad, dips including houmous;
- Hearty Food Co. - fresh and frozen ready meals, pasta, pizza and fresh foods;
- H.W. Nevill - bread and morning goods;
- Ms Molly's - desserts, sweet biscuits, chocolate, cakes;
- Nightingale Farms - fresh vegetables;
- Redmere Farms - fresh vegetables;
- Rosedene Farms - fresh fruits;
- Springforce - household products such as toilet roll and kitchen paper;
- Suntrail Farms - fresh citrus/exotic fruits;
- Stockwell & Co - kitchen cupboard 'essentials' such as canned food (excluding fruit and vegetables which are branded as The Growers Harvest), tea bags and coffee, cereals, drinks, baking goods; named after T.E. Stockwell who sold the first packet of tea to Jack Cohen, founder of Tesco.
- The Growers Harvest - packaged fruit, vegetables and pulses including rice and oats;
- Willow Farms - fresh poultry products;
- Woodside Farms - fresh pork products;
- Tesco Essentials - health and beauty products.

=== Asda ===
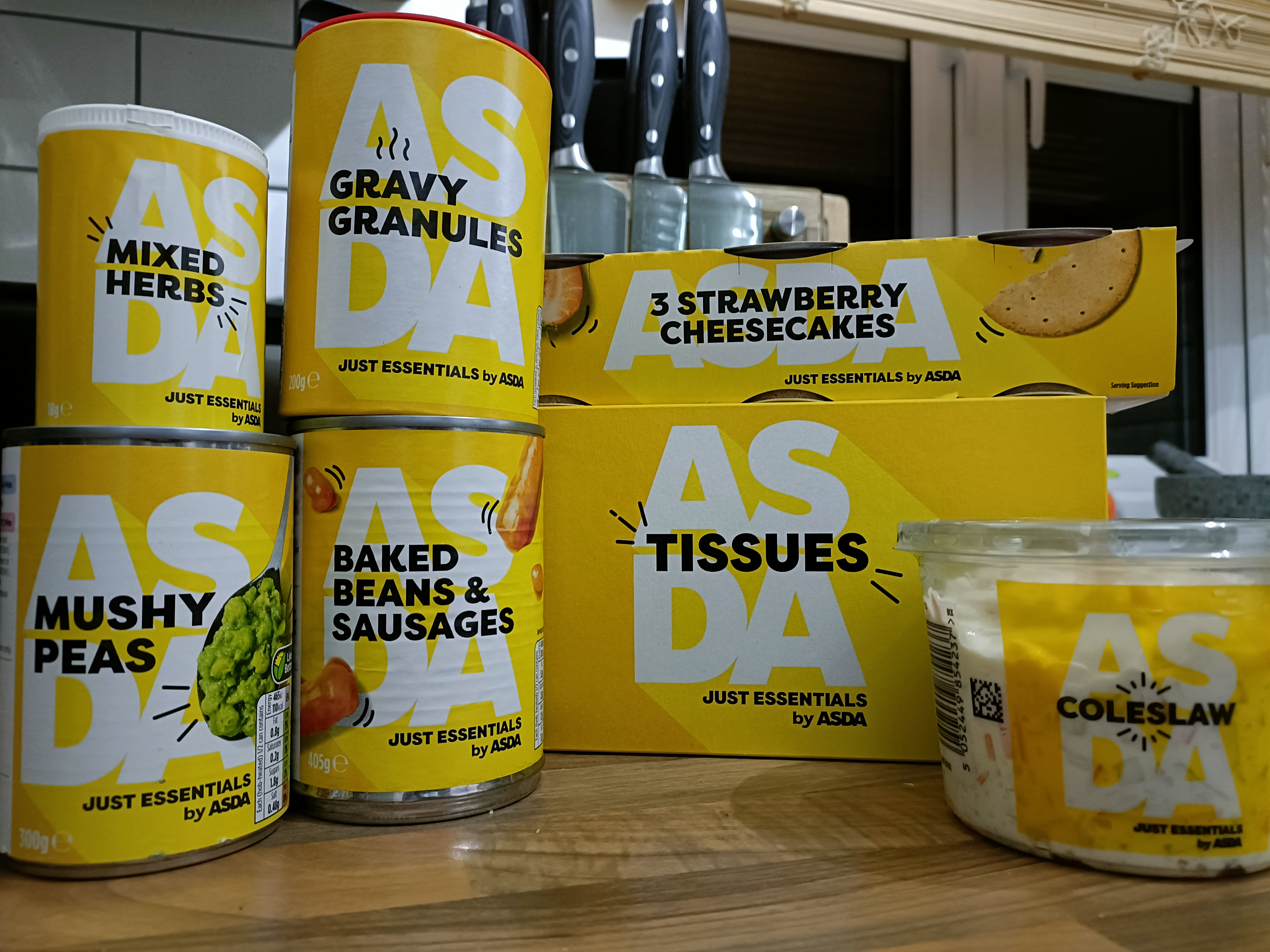
A selection of products showing the "Just Essentials by Asda" branding

Just Essentials by Asda, formerly Asda Smartprice, is a no-frills private label trade name. It can trace its origins to Asda's Farm Stores brand launched in the mid-1990s, which consisted of products that were offered at a lower price than the equivalent famous name brand product and Asda's own brand equivalent. The Farm Stores brand originally consisted of a small number of food only products, largely frozen such as frozen chips and a small range of ready meals: this range later expanded to include fresh food. Just Essentials by Asda products are almost always the lowest price option in a product category in Asda stores. Occasionally this difference is only a few pence; in others, however, it is a marked difference. For example, a box of Just Essentials Biological Washing Powder costs £2.30, while the equivalent Asda brand washing powder costs £5.00, and well known name brand alternatives can cost from £7.00 upwards (as of December 2022).

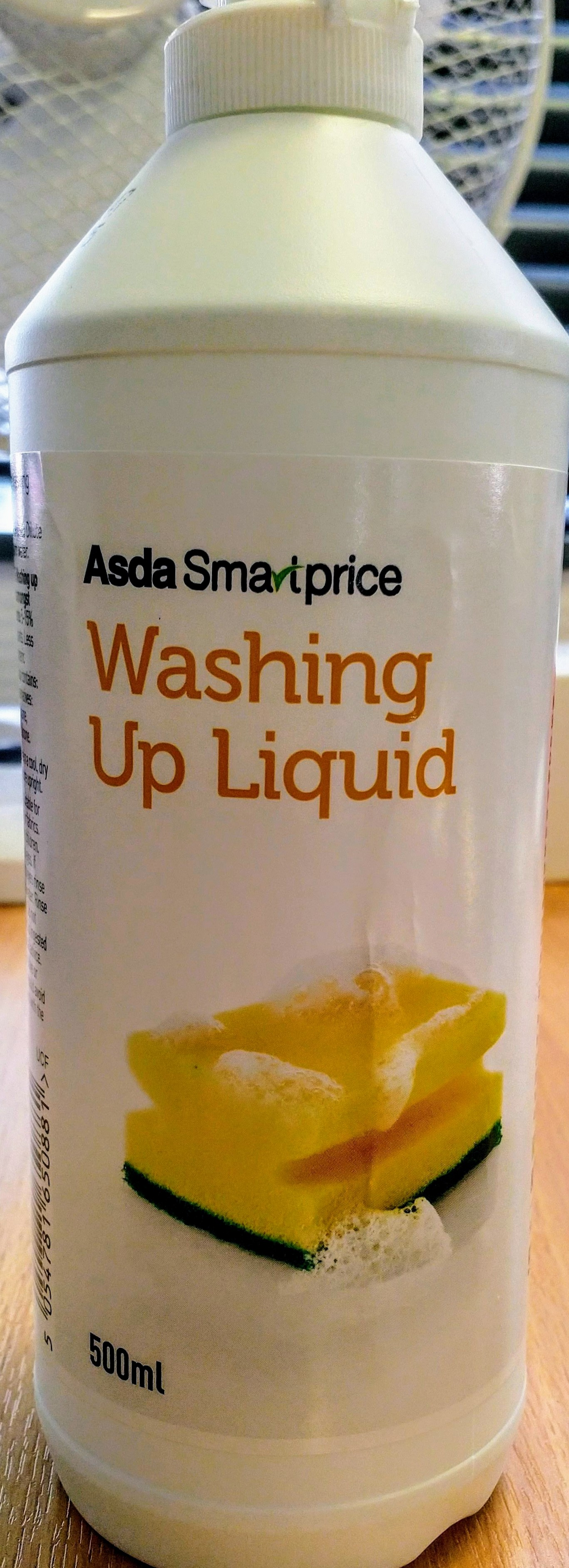
A bottle of Asda Smartprice washing up liquid. The Asda logo is reminiscent of the one used by the supermarket in the early 1980s.

The Smartprice label was originally a food only brand; however, over the years it expanded to cover almost every product range in the store, including clothing and furnishings with the George Smart Price brand. Like early generic products in the US, some Smartprice products originally lacked what can be thought of as 'frills' in the modern brand name or supermarket own brand; for example, the Smartprice toothpaste had an old fashioned screw cap rather than the now more common flip cap, and the Smartprice range of crisps came in traditional clear plastic bags rather than the foil bags common to most name brand versions.

Asda Smartprice logo history

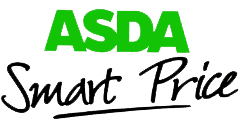
This logo was used from 2004 to 2012.

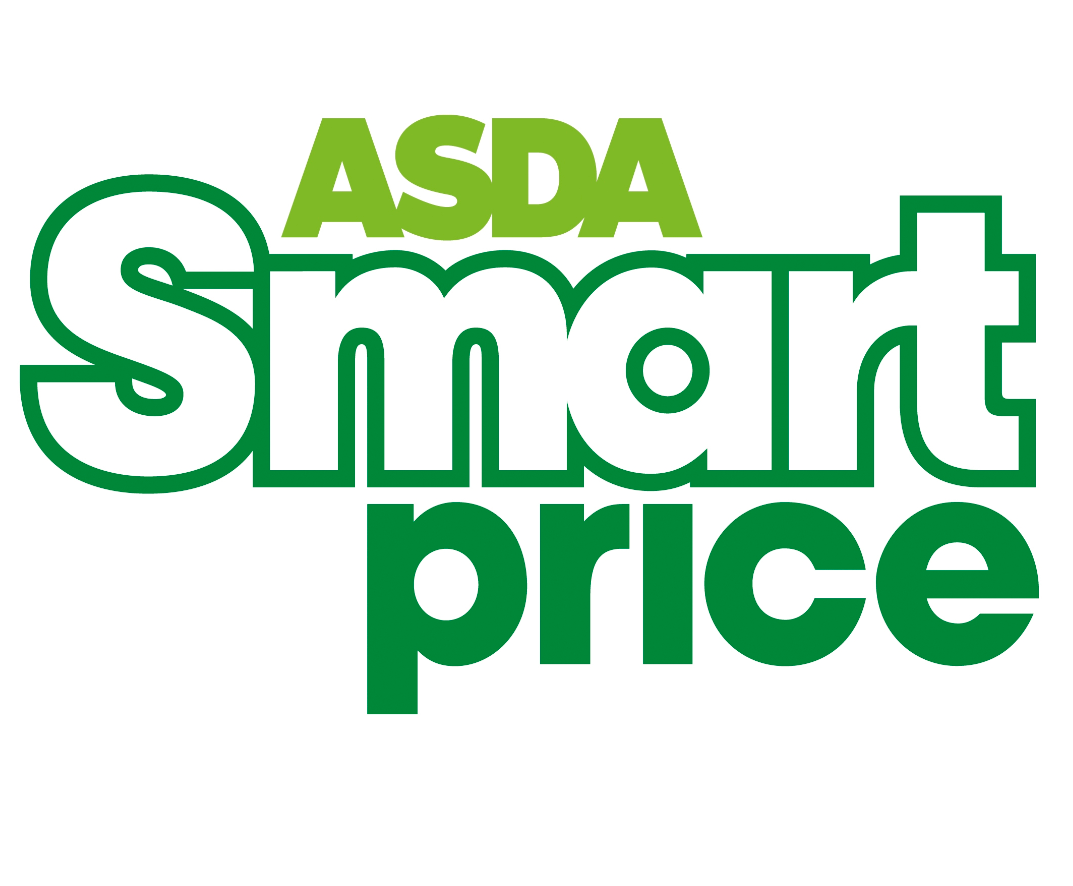
This logo was used from 2012 to 2014.

This logo was used from 2014 to 2017.

The last logo before the rebrand was used from 2017 to 2022.

Asda's Smartprice logo and packaging has changed several times since its introduction. It was revised in 2012 to match the branding of Walmart's Great Value line at the time, but a further redesign in 2014 and 2017, removed the similarity in visual style. On 28 March 2022, Asda announced the Smartprice brand would be replaced by a new brand, Asda Just Essentials, commencing May 2022. The similarity between the new brand name and Waitrose's own budget brand, Essential Waitrose, launched in 2009, has led to Waitrose issuing a legal letter to Asda, raising trademark concerns although this was later dropped.

=== Sainsbury's ===
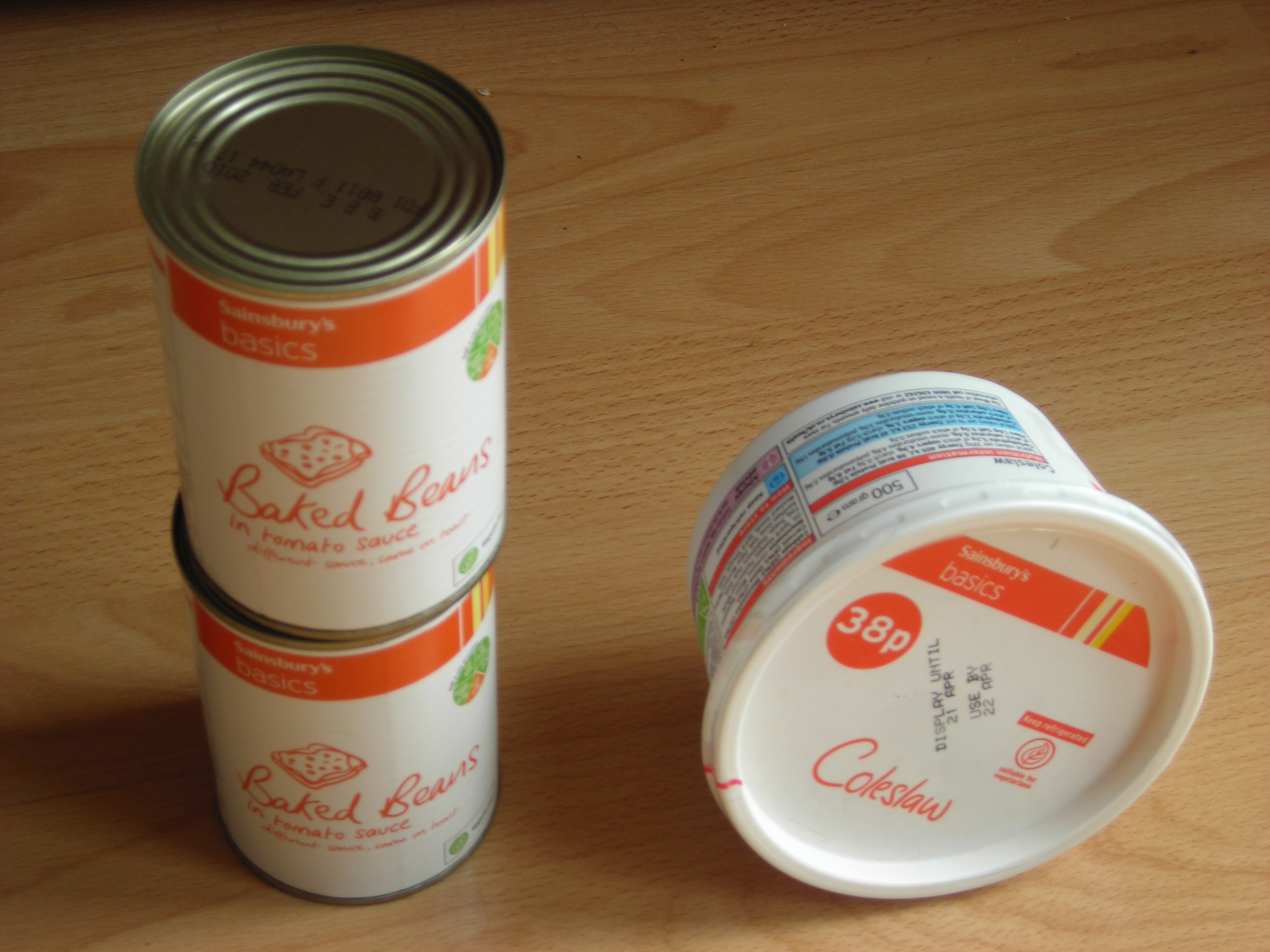
The own label Sainsbury's Basics brand was used for its low cost products until the late 2010s.

Sainsbury's Basics was an economy range of around 550 lines, mainly food but also including other areas such as toiletries and stationery. The Basics range used minimal packaging with simple orange and white designs. Sainsbury's Local stores sold none or very few of these lines. Sainsbury's seeks to differentiate itself on its own label items on quality and many of the Basics products cost more than what may be considered the equivalent products at Asda, Tesco and Morrisons. This can range from price differences of 1p for Basics Sultanas to Basics Spaghetti tin, where Sainsbury's price was nearly twice that of Asda Smart Price (the weight of the Sainsbury's product is very slightly more and of better quality).

Sainsbury's first lower tier range was called Sainsbury's Economy, which was launched in the 1990s to rival Tesco Value; it was later renamed Sainsbury's Low Price, then Sainsbury's Basics. When Basics was first rolled out, the name of the product and slogan was in a handwritten orange typeface with a simple outline hand drawing of the product. They later used a thin sans serif typeface for the product name, while retaining the handwritten typeface for the slogan. The hand drawn graphic was removed in favour of a coloured simple graphic with considerably more detail.

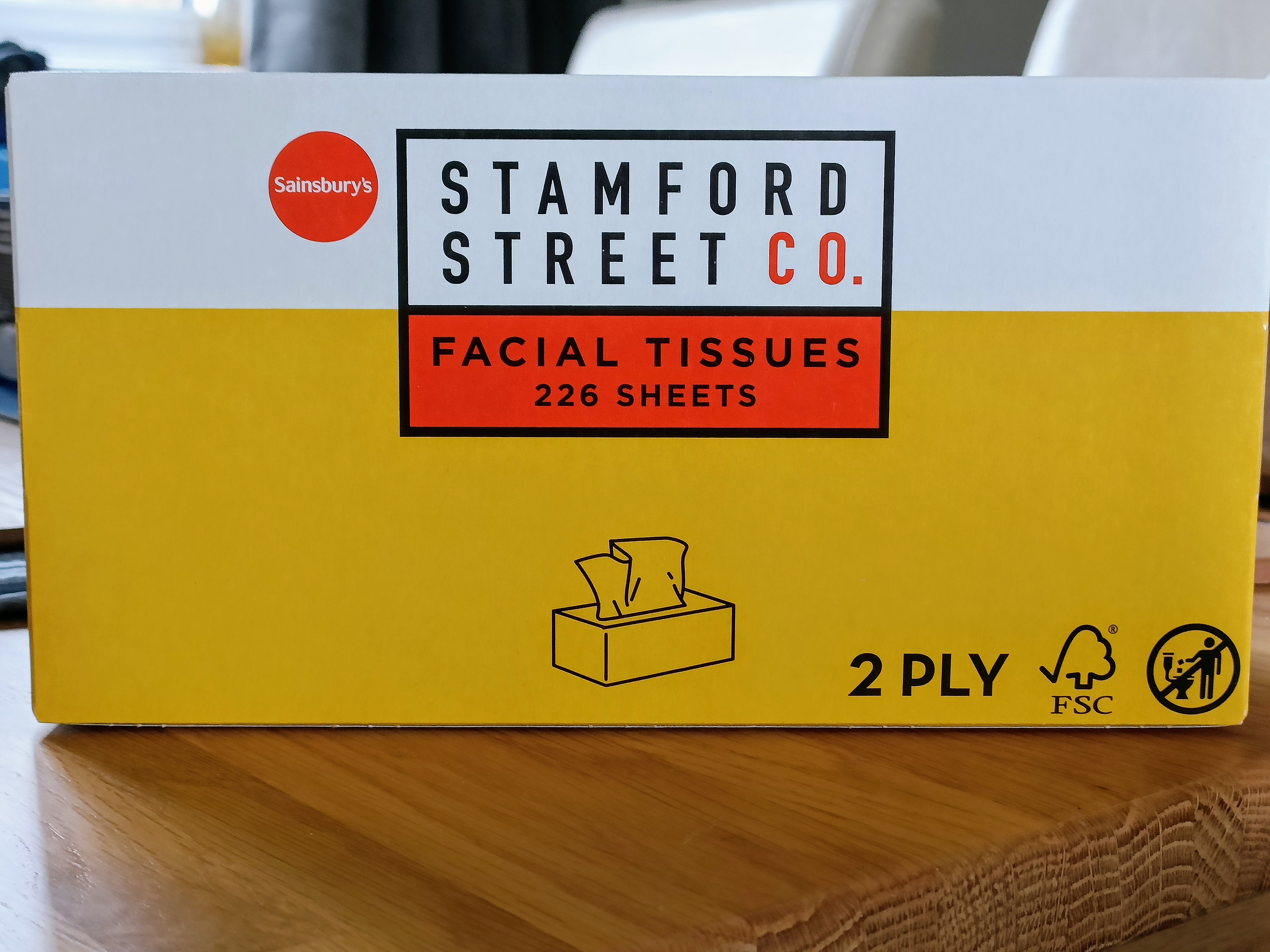
A picture of a box of Stamford Street Co Facial Tissues, demonstrating the branding used

The same Facial Tissues were previously sold under the "House247" brand. The tissue box graphic and typeface for "2 ply" have been reused.

Sainsbury's phased out the Basics brand in favour of using tertiary brands similar to Tesco.

- Allcrofts Deli Classics - pastry products such as pies, pasties and sausage rolls.
- Stamford Street Food Company - chilled and frozen ready meals, chilled pizza and garlic bread, dressings such as coleslaw and potato salad. Named after the supermarket's former Head Office location in London;
- Hubbard's Foodstore - store cupboard staples such as tea bags, jam, tinned foods, condiments and soft drinks, the name possibly being a reference to Old Mother Hubbard's cupboard;
- Daily's - bread and morning goods, cereals;
- House 247 - tissue paper products, refuse sacks, cleaning products;
- Mary Ann's Dairy - cheese and yoghurts, named after Mary Ann Sainsbury;
- Lovett's Family Favourites - chocolate, cakes, desserts and biscuits;
- Just Snax - crisps, snacks and salted nuts;
- J James & Family - fresh and frozen meat products, named after John James Sainsbury;
- The Greengrocer - frozen fruit and vegetables.
- (Im)Perfectly Tasty - fresh fruit and vegetables, usually class II and/or of irregular size, shape or with blemishes that do not affect the eating quality.

In May 2023 Sainsbury's moved all of its value range under the Stamford Street Co. brand.

=== International ===
International Stores launched its "Plain And Simple" brand in 1977, with television advertising and packaging with white backgrounds and black ink.

=== Aldi ===
Everyday Essentials is a value brand by Aldi. It was going to be rolled out in June 2012, however it was put on hold after a source close to Aldi said that it looked dated against Tesco's Everyday Value brand, which at the time was being overhauled.

=== Morrisons ===
Morrisons Savers, formerly M Savers, is an economy brand which sells items ranging from food and drink to toiletries. This replaced 'Value' which in turn was a replacement for 'Bettabuy' and 'Farmer's Boy'. Morrisons, in some areas, is slowly adjusting its line of budget products from the aggregated "M Savers" brand to more discrete forms. For example, the company has utilised the "Greenside Deli" brand for its dairy products.

=== Lidl ===
Simply is a brand used by Lidl in an attempt to compete with Aldi's Everyday Essentials.

== Premium ==
These value brands are not value brands as such but are competing with the big five's own-label products, i.e. Asda's "Chosen by You" or Sainsbury's "by Sainsbury's".

=== Waitrose ===
Departing from earlier practice, Waitrose rebranded their entry level range of products as Essential Waitrose. The marketing of essential Waitrose centres around the tagline "quality you'd expect at prices you wouldn't". 1,600 new and existing products have been rebranded with this name using simple white-based packaging. In keeping with the rebranding across the John Lewis Partnership, these are now branded Essential Waitrose & Partners .

=== Marks and Spencer ===
In 2012, Marks and Spencer issued their value brand, Simply M&S, in response to Waitrose's Essential range.

== Convenience stores ==
Many of the main convenience stores have an in-house value brand.

=== Heritage Value ===
Heritage Value is the value brand of Nisa. As a convenience store, prices tend to be considerably higher; a 29p pack of penne pasta in Lidl will cost you £1.09 in Nisa.

=== Daily Basics ===
Daily Basics is a brand owned by the Irish retail group Musgrave Group, and is an in-house brand which is sold by SuperValu. As a convenience store, prices tend to be high, with a litre of orange juice costing 89p.

=== S Budget ===
S Budget is SPAR's value brand. It is an international value brand, and thus includes some products that in the UK are considered very unusual in a value brand such as polony chubb (slicing sausage).

=== Honest Value ===
Honest Value is the Co-operative value brand which launched on 4 November 2020. It replaced the Simply Value brand first used by Somerfield and which was retained after Somerfield's acquisition but which was discontinued after 2016. (Simply Value had replaced the Co-operative's everyday brand).

== Wholesalers ==
It is not uncommon for wholesalers to have their own value brand to help independents compete on price.

=== Euroshopper ===
Booker (owned by Tesco) owns value brand Happy Shopper but also sells Euroshopper products, which are produced by AMS Sourcing B.V. They are also sold in their symbol group stores Premier Stores, Londis and Budgens.

=== Best One Essentials ===
Best-In Essentials, known previously as Best-In Economy is the value brand of Bestway. Best In have recently overhauled their entire range. The Best In range was relaunched as Best One, with the value brand being relabelled Best One Essentials. As these items were sold in franchised Best One stores, it was argued that consumers would expect to carry the same label as the store.

=== Lifestyle Value ===
In 2018, following a merger between the Today's Group with its principal competitor, Landmark Wholesale, the Today's label was rescinded. The newly formed company was named Unitas Wholesale and elected to keep the popular Lifestyle brand, with its economy range of Lifestyle Value. In 2024, Unitas Wholesale began the process of rebranding it Lifestyle brand to 'Local Living'.

== Others ==
=== Everyday ===
In response to the United Kingdom cost of living crisis, Boots announced it was introducing a sixty-item "Everyday" range, with everything £1.50 or less.

== See also ==
- Private label
