= No Frills (grocery store) =

Canadian discount supermarket chain; a subsidiary of the Loblaw Companies

- The banner's current logo

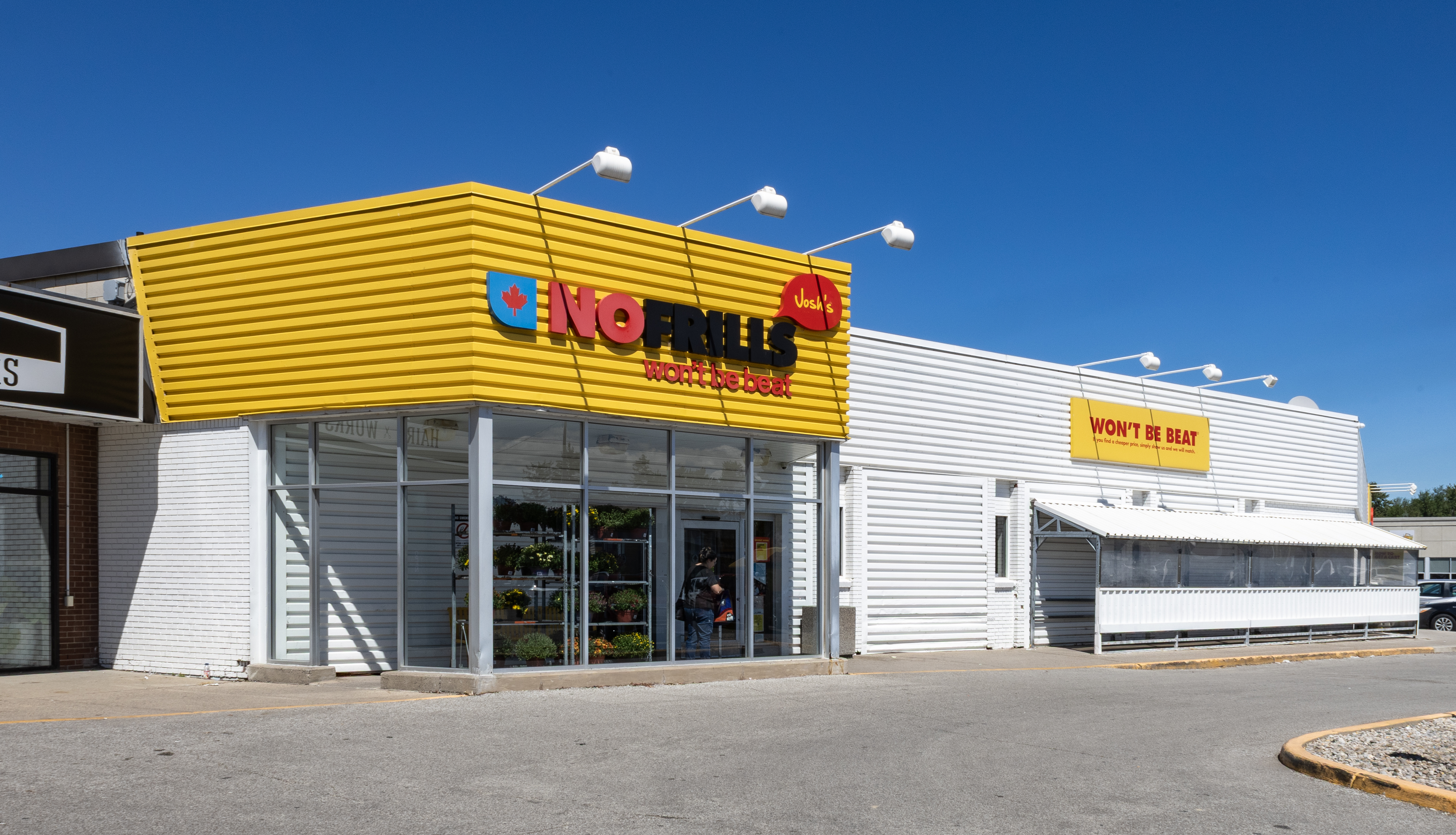
- A No Frills location in Essex County, Ontario
- Type: Subsidiary
- Industry: Retail; Supermarket
- Founded: July 5, 1978; 48 years ago
- Number of locations: 343 (2026)
- Area served: Canada
- Products: Bakery, dairy, deli, frozen foods, gasoline (select locations), general grocery, general merchandise, liquor (select locations), meat & poultry, pharmacy, produce, seafood, snacks
- Brands: No Name; President's Choice
- Number of employees: 6,000+
- Parent: Loblaw Companies
- Website: www.nofrills.ca

No Frills (currently styled NOFRILLS and formerly styled nofrills) is a Canadian chain of discount supermarkets, owned by Loblaw Companies Limited, a subsidiary of George Weston Limited. There are over 300 franchise stores located in nine Canadian provinces.

== History ==
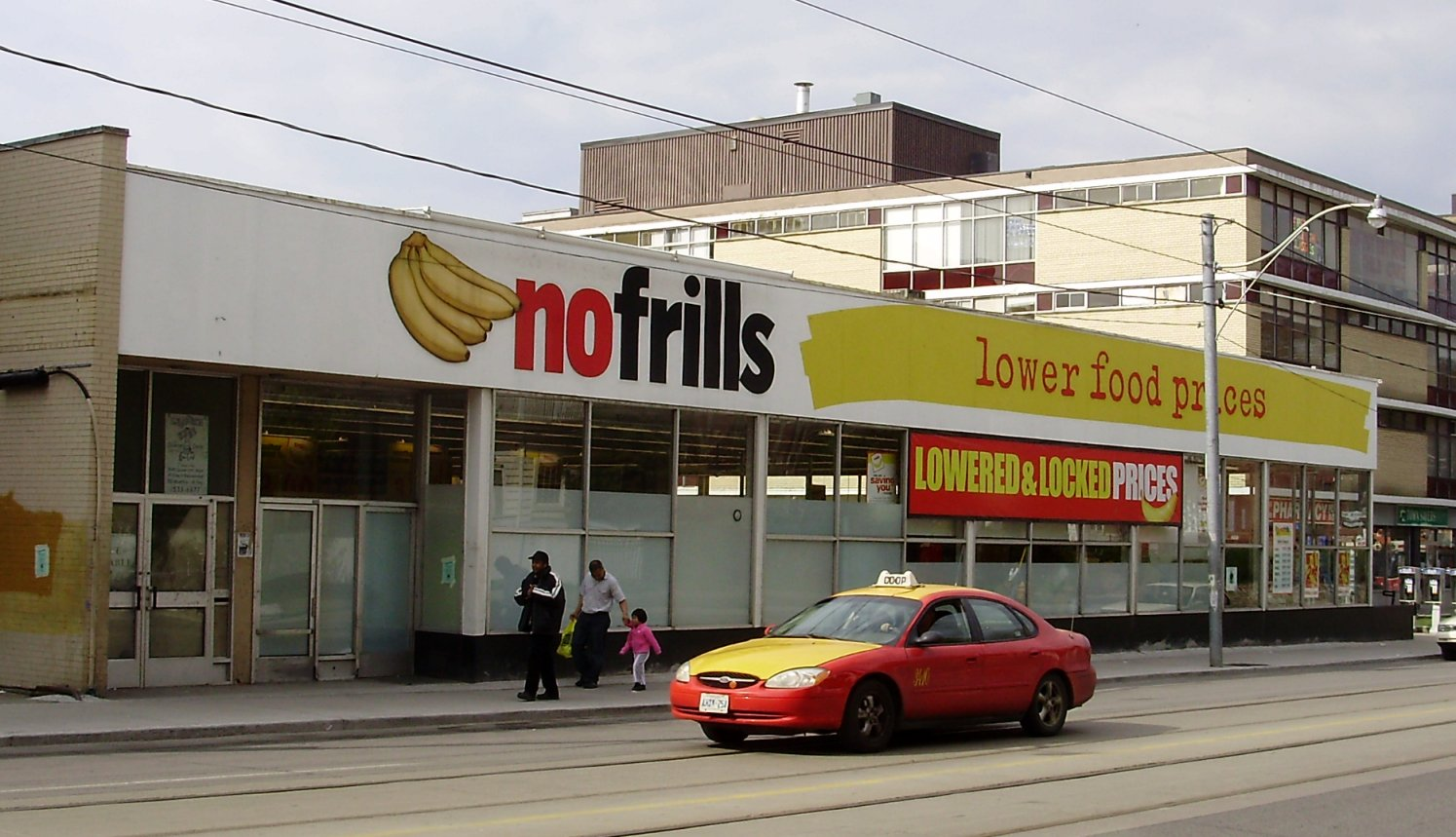
A No Frills store in the Parkdale neighbourhood of Toronto

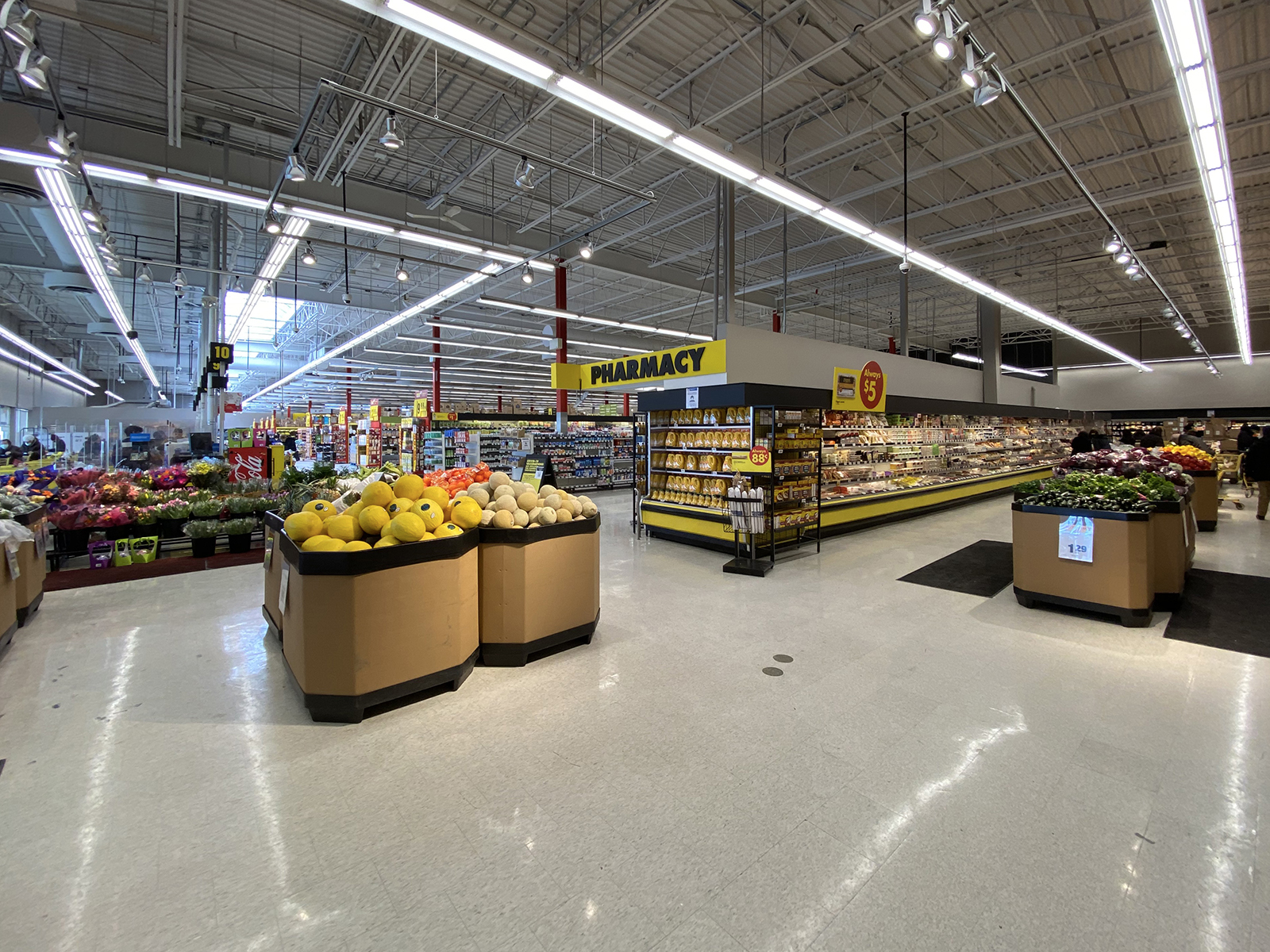
No Frills interior

The first No Frills store was a converted Loblaws outlet slated for closure. The store opened on July 5, 1978, in East York, Toronto. While it offered a very limited range of goods and basic customer service, the store promoted discount prices. The opening of the prototype outlet coincided with a period of rising inflation rates and consumer complaints regarding the high price of food. Similar limited variety supermarkets had been in operation in Europe for a number of years, and had captured significant market share in several countries.

Months earlier, Loblaw had launched a line of generic products called "No Name" that consisted of 16 unbranded items in very basic yellow and black packaging. The new line was promoted as offering savings of between 10 and 40 per cent over comparable national brands. As No Name sales exceeded the company's own projections, Loblaws Supermarkets president Dave Nichol predicted the day when "limited line stores" would offer a complete assortment of No Name groceries While the first No Frills (originally branded no frills) featured the new generic product line, most items were still national brands. Though the European model typically offered dry goods, Loblaw promoted "fresh produce at the lowest possible price" as a way of attracting customers.

Former logo in 2007. The banana was later removed along with a format change.

In order to reduce costs as much as possible, No Frills customers had to forego some of the conveniences that North American supermarket shoppers had come to expect. Customers were required to pack their own groceries and bring their own shopping bags or pay three cents for each. The prototype store had only four checkout counters and operated on a "low labour" principle of minimal staffing. Product displays were purely functional with items left in their cardboard boxes with the front cut away. Produce, normally washed and stacked, was left unwashed in its shipping carton. The original store did not offer fresh meat since refrigeration units had been removed to reduce expenses. Instead of the 8,000 items normally carried by the average supermarket, only 500 were available, usually represented by one brand and in only one size. Instead of each item individually marked, prices were displayed overhead and customers were provided with a price list. Cashiers underwent three weeks of training and were required to memorize all prices in the store. Loblaws president Dave Nichol promoted the minimalism of the new operations as a way to save money in a difficult economy. "We took all the frills out."

In spite of the limited product selection and minimal customer service, the first No Frills store, which advertised "the lowest overall food prices in Toronto", was successful from the initial launch. Opening day drew more shoppers than the store could handle.

While some first day customers complained about the added inconveniences, most said they didn't mind and were pleased with the money they saved. With the successful launch of the prototype store, Loblaw began converting a number of its older, more marginal outlets to the new discount format. Within a few months, the company had opened three No Frills stores in Toronto.

During the 1980s, the chain expanded beyond the Greater Toronto Area. In 1988, there were 19 No Frills stores located in Ontario. A year earlier, Loblaw began converting the outlets from company owned stores to franchise operations. The number of stores more than doubled to 48 by 1994. By the late 1990s, that number had increased to 79 outlets. The new franchise operations typically displayed the name of the owner, such as “Danny’s nofrills” "Joe's nofrills" or "Derek's nofrills". While most No Frills stores were former Loblaws locations, the company had also acquired outlets. Three former Knob Hill Farms supermarkets in Toronto were converted to No Frills after the chain had closed all of its stores in 2001 due to increasing competition. In 2007, Loblaw began expanding No Frills beyond Ontario, first into Western Canada, and later into Atlantic Canada.

== Present ==
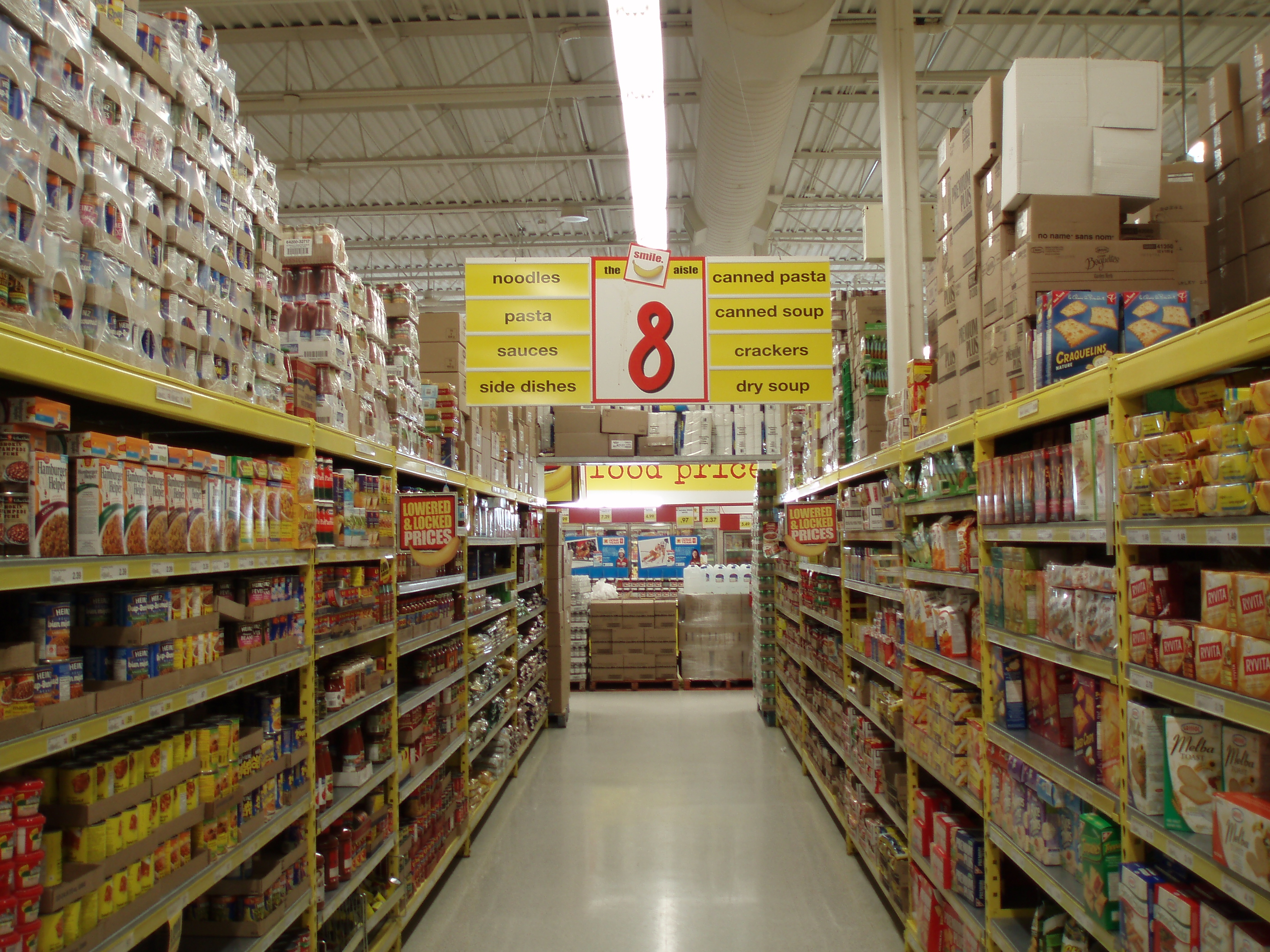
Inside a typical No Frills store. Oak Ridges neighbourhood, Richmond Hill

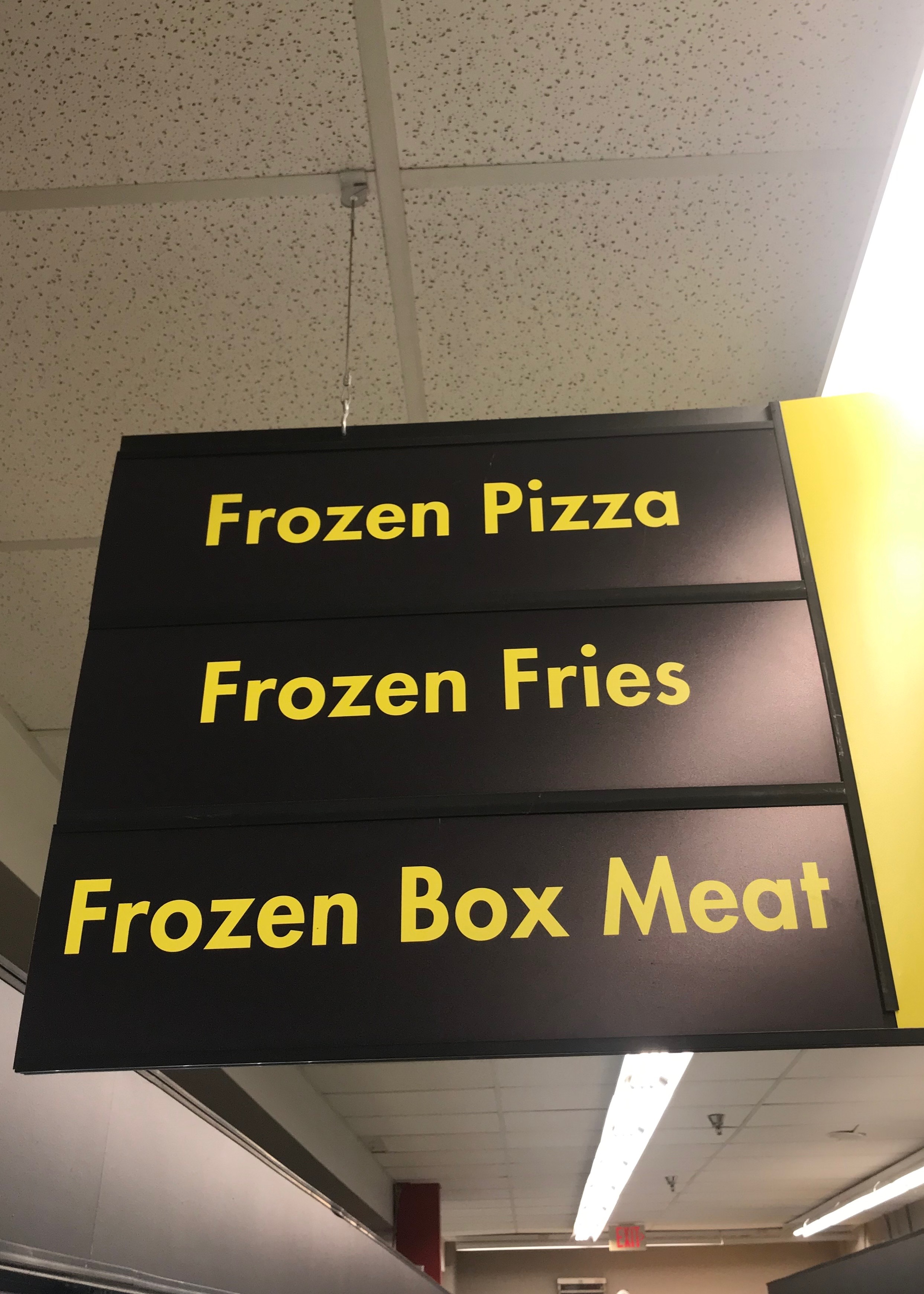
No Frills aisle sign

Currently, No Frills stores are much more like conventional supermarkets but continue to feature deep discount prices. Items are typically left in their cardboard shipping boxes but are arranged on store shelves and produce is conventionally displayed. While the original No Frills outlets stocked only the most basic products, today's stores offer a wide array of items and brands that include Loblaw's own private or 'control label' products. No Name, which is still heavily featured, has expanded from the original 16 items to more than 2,900 and the company's premium President's Choice line is readily available on store shelves.

The range of services has also expanded with some outlets that offer fresh meat and fish counters, some which have premium offerings. Frozen food sections, excluded from the original stores due to the cost of refrigeration, are now standard. Other features remain unchanged, though, with No Frills customers still required to pack their own groceries and bring their own shopping bags or pay 5 cents per bag. Loblaw's other major supermarket chain, Loblaws which is considered a full-service supermarket, has been moved upmarket and features exclusive amenities not found in No Frills such as a bakery, deli, and fresh prepared-counter all in-store; at No Frills there is a much smaller selection of these types of foods which are prepared off-site and sent to the store. Some Loblaws stores have been converted into No Frills, even in affluent neighbourhoods like Bayview Hill in the Greater Toronto Area.

In 2013, Loblaw began piloting a smaller, hard discount store format known as "Box by No Frills"; the locations were significantly smaller, with around 10,000 square feet of retail space (as opposed to the average 25,000 square foot size of No Frills). By 2017, the pilot had been phased out: some of its locations were converted to standard No Frills stores.

The interior of the new format of No Frills in Elmira, Ontario

In February 2026, Loblaws announced it will spend CA$10B over 5 years to open 70 new stores (31 new No Frills) and will renovate close to 200 stores. Of the 31 new No Frills stores, 27 will be in Ontario. In March 2026, Loblaws opened a No Frills in Komoka, Ontario, featuring a new format and design.

=== Hauler ad campaign ===
In May 2018, No Frills launched a new marketing campaign called Hauler. The company released their own limited NoFrills themed clothing line, including T-shirts and hoodies. A TV advertisement and song; also called Hauler, were released to promote the campaign. The song was subsequently posted on music streaming platforms.

In May 2020, No Frills released a second song; "A Cart Apart", to promote social distancing and safe shopping practices during the COVID-19 pandemic.

In September 2020, a full-length album called Haulin' State of Mind was released, containing the two previously released songs, along with new material. Many No Frills stores periodically play these songs over in-store loudspeakers as a form of background music. The song "Bananas" was featured in a skit on The Tonight Show Starring Jimmy Fallon, thinking the song was from an actual musical artist, not a grocery store chain.

== See also ==
- List of supermarket chains in Canada
