= Donald Watt =

Donald Watt may refer to:

== Academics ==
- D. E. R. Watt (1926–2004), Scottish historian, professor of Medieval History at St Andrews University
- Donald Cameron Watt (1928–2014), professor at London School of Economics, winner of the Wolfson History Prize

== Others ==
- Don Watt (designer) (1936–2009), Canadian designer
- Donald Watt (sportsman) (1920–2007), Australian all-round sportsman
- Donald J. Watt (1918–2000), Australian author of a fictitious Holocaust memoir
- Don Watt (footballer) (born 1953), Scottish footballer

== See also ==
- Donald Watts (born 1951), American former basketball player
