= Euro Shopper =

Discount brand of everyday commodities

- Industry: Food retail
- Founded: 1996
- Founder: AMS Sourcing B.V. Ahold
- Owner: AMS Sourcing
- Website: ams-sourcing.com

Euro Shopper is a discount brand of everyday commodities developed and marketed by AMS Sourcing B.V. It was introduced to the market in 1996, and branded products have been sold by some of the AMS members in different countries in Europe since then. In all stores owned by the Dutch Ahold group, all Euro-Shopper products were phased out in 2013 in favor of the AH Basic, which was then also phased out in 2017.

Countries selling Euro Shopper in 2008

Most Euro Shopper products are commodities with long shelf life. There are both national products, sold in only one country, and international products, sold in all countries. On 10 December 2012, sales of Euro Shopper products hit £150m.

From April 2013 to 2014, both ICA Sweden and Ahold phased out Euro Shopper branded products replacing them with their own brands, ICA Basic in Sweden and AH Basic in all countries where they have stores.

== AMS members selling Euro Shopper branded products as of 2008 ==
Chain	Country
Albert Heijn (Ahold)	Netherlands, Belgium, Curaçao, Germany
ICA	Sweden, Norway
Esselunga	Italy
Jeronimo Martins & Filhos SA	Portugal
Kesko	Finland
Hagar	Iceland
Albert (Ahold)	Czech Republic
Elomas LTD	Greece
Premier (Booker Group), Morrisons (2016)	United Kingdom

== Euro Shopper Energy Drink ==
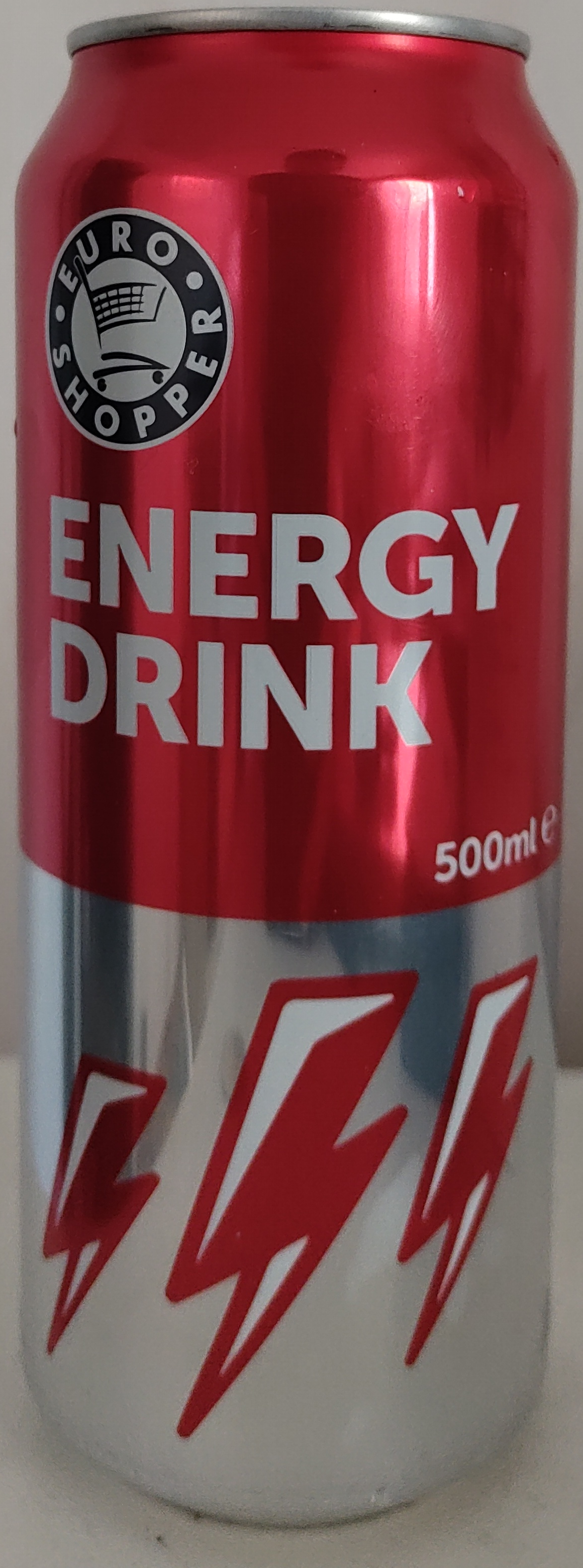
Euro Shopper Energy Drink has been sold since 2007

Euro Shopper Energy Drink is an energy drink sold under the Euro Shopper brand. It is available in 250ml and 500ml cans, as well as a 1 liter bottle. In Finland, Sweden, and the United Kingdom, a sugar free and berry flavored variant are available only in 250ml cans. Sour apple and sour cherry flavors were briefly available in the UK around 2015 in 500ml cans, however they have since been presumably discontinued with no formal announcement from Euro Shopper.

In the UK, the drink has been available in most convenience stores since 2007. The drink (and other low-cost energy drinks) are associated with chav culture.

In July 2022, Kesko (the supplier of Euroshopper products in Finland) decided to alter the recipe by replacing some of the drink's sugar content with the artificial sweeteners sucralose and acesulfame K. This change led to a collapse in sales, prompting the reintroduction of products made with the original recipe in September 2023.

In Finnish popular culture and colloquial speech, the drink is often referred to by the acronym ES, referencing its brand.

Euro Shopper Energy Drink has been sold in Finland since 2008 and has become a meme in internet culture due to its association with Jonne jokes. The drink is generally considered an affordable alternative to other energy drinks, making it popular among young people, despite even cheaper options being available outside K-Group stores.

== See also ==
- Value brands in the United Kingdom
