= No Name (brand) =

Canadian generic brand

no name

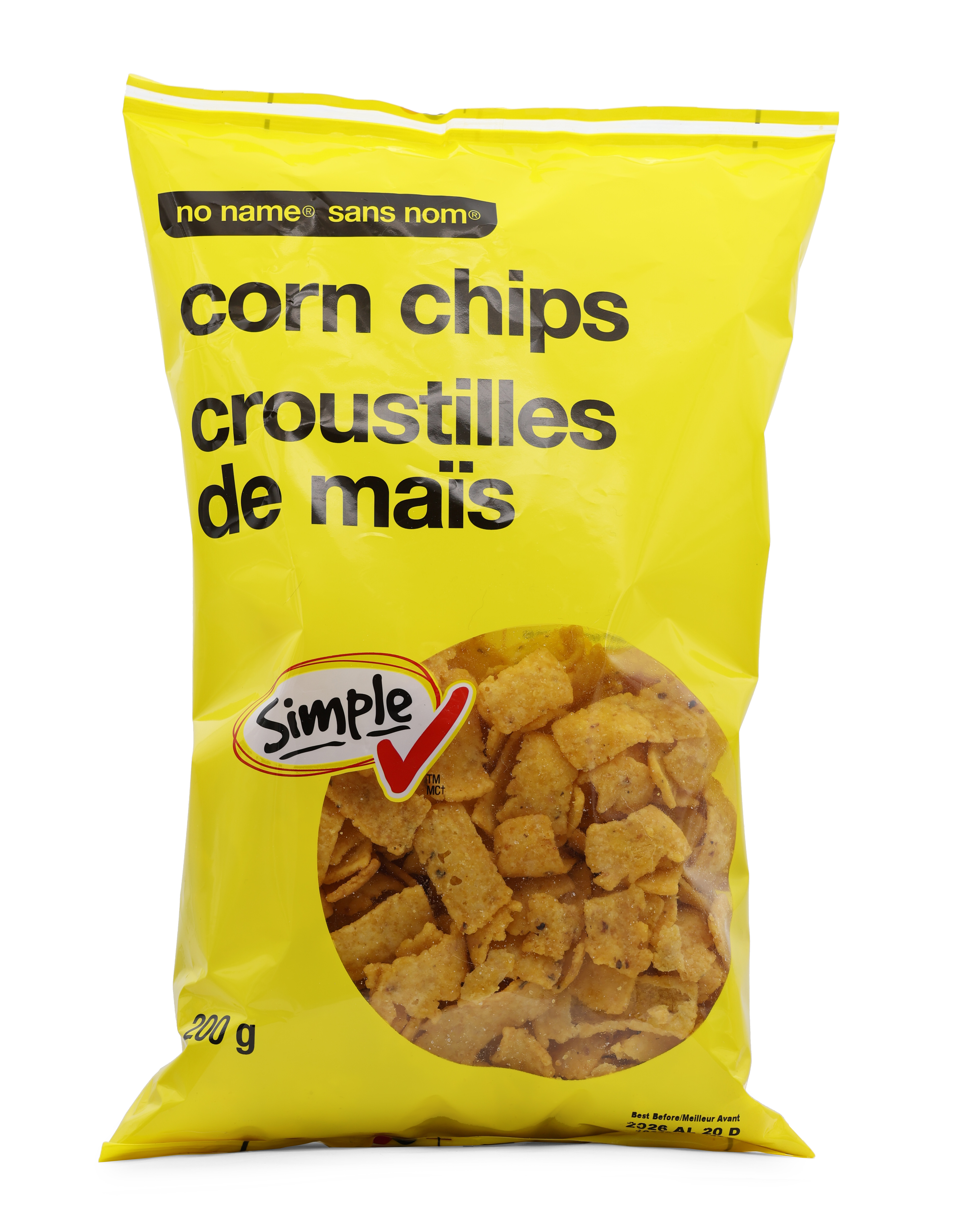
- Corn chips from No Name
- Product type: Generic brand
- Current owner: Loblaw Companies
- Country: Canada
- Introduced: March 21, 1978
- Website: noname.ca

No Name (stylized in all lowercase as no name; French: sans nom) is a Canadian line of generic brand grocery and household products sold by Loblaw Companies Limited.

No Name products are available in stores across Canada that include Loblaws, Dominion, Extra Foods, Fortinos, Freshmart, Maxi, No Frills, Provigo, Real Atlantic Superstore, Real Canadian Superstore, Shoppers Drug Mart & Pharmaprix, SuperValu, Valu-mart, Your Independent Grocer, and Zehrs. Additionally, No Name-branded stores were tested in 2023 and 2024.

== Launch ==
On March 21, 1978, Loblaws launched "No Name" with 16 generic or unbranded items in black and yellow packaging, including ground coffee, instant skim milk powder, tomato juice, and powdered laundry detergent in a plastic bag. Initially promoted as "basic products in plain packaging at down-to-earth everyday low prices", No Name promised savings of between 10 and 40 percent over national brands. The launch beat rival supermarket chain Dominion, with its own line of generic products, by 24 hours. Available at Stuarts' 135 stores across Ontario, full-page ads claimed that No Name offered the best value for money as a combination of price and quality – the result of cost controls associated with using standard instead of custom packaging and the efforts of its own "task force" in negotiating lower priced, bulk orders from suppliers.

The introduction of No Name, along with other generics, coincided with a period of rising inflation rates and consumer complaints regarding the high price of food. Two years earlier, French hypermarket Carrefour unveiled Produits Libres, a line of 50 unbranded products. Loblaws Supermarkets president Dave Nichol modelled No Name on Produits Libres. Although Nichol made no guarantee that the product line would be continued beyond the initial launch, after two and a half weeks more than a million units had been sold. With suppliers trying to keep up with demand, and some products sold out, Nichol declared No Name a "runaway success" that exceeded his own expectations:

But diving headlong into No-Name products, which have had only limited success in France and the United States, was Nichol's idea. Grocery shoppers have snapped them up at a rate that has astonished even Nichol. In nine months, Loblaws has sold 15 million of them, which Nichol says is enough to make Ontario the largest market in the world for unbranded products. And strangely enough, Loblaws shoppers seem to be developing a brand loyalty to these unbranded products.

A few months after the launch, Loblaws opened the first No Frills store, a deep discount, limited service and selection supermarket, with only 500 items, which featured No Name among its product selection. The opening proved a success and two more Toronto area stores soon followed. Meanwhile, Nichol continued to heavily promote No Name on television and was dubbed "Mr. No Name" by news headlines. While one competitor spoke critically of Nichol for spending so much on advertising, thereby increasing the costs associated with a discount product line, Nichol responded that Loblaw had simply redirected more of its promotional budget towards No Name. Four months after the launch, generic products across all Canadian grocery store shelves accounted for nearly 10 percent of supermarket sales. One year later, Loblaw had expanded its generic line-up to over a hundred items.

== Branding, packaging and promotion ==
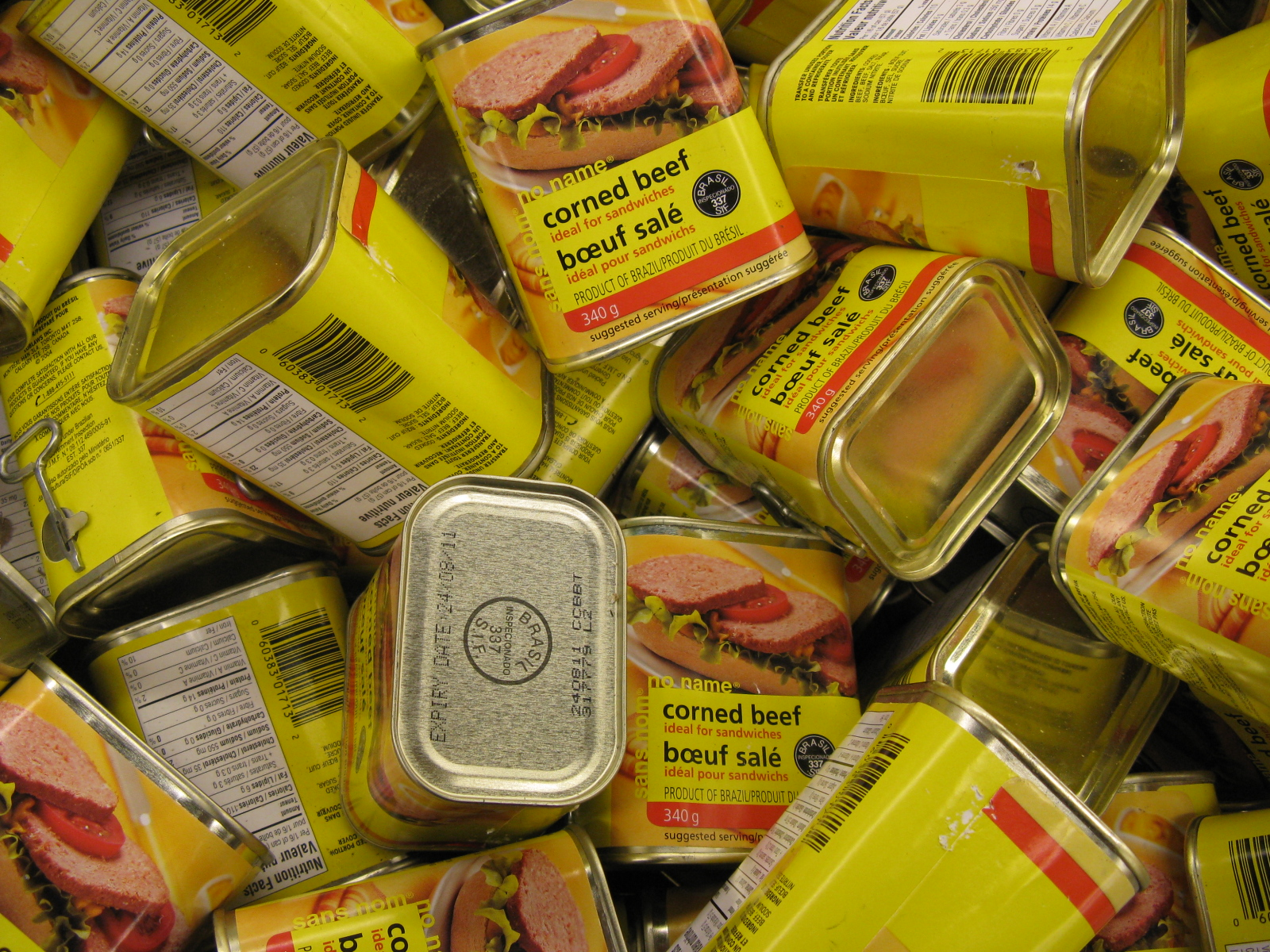
No Name corned beef

In keeping with the generic nature of the product line, the original No Name packaging showed no branding – only text with a basic product description and name, such as "freshly ground coffee" or "fabric softener", on a solid background. Years later, a "No Name" registered trademark appeared. While other generic lines presented their packaging as black on white, Toronto designer Don Watt chose black, boldface text in a Helvetica font, all lower case, on a bright yellow background, as a means of attracting the attention of shoppers.

Throughout the 1980s, Loblaw continued to promote No Name as a value-oriented alternative to higher priced, nationally advertised products. In 1981, Dave Nichol went on television with two grocery carts, one with a selection of No Name items and the other with comparable national brands, to demonstrate a 30 percent savings:

For five or six years I did nothing but go into people's living rooms and say, 'Here's one basket of national brands for $150, and here are the same products from no name for $100. If you don't like them, we'll give you the national brands free.

By 1982, the number of No Name items had increased to some 500 different products and ranged from canned peas, to spaghetti sauce, to tooth paste and even windshield washer fluid. The Financial Times of Canada noted that in spite of basic packaging and the reputation of generics as inferior, "Loblaws No Name line was, in fact, competing directly with national brands." The newspaper also commented that the heavy promotion of No Name by Loblaws president Dave Nichol had helped boost the sale of generics in all supermarkets.

Loblaw also expanded the line beyond basic grocery and household items in an apparent bid to appeal to a wider range of consumer tastes. Products such as No Name gourmet barbecue sauce, Dijon mustard, escargot and imported jams from France appeared on Loblaw shelves. In late 1983, "President's Blend gourmet coffee", in the familiar black and yellow packaging, made its debut and sales proved so strong that the decision was made to create a separate, premium line of products called "President's Choice". Beyond gourmet items, there were also those of a more unusual, albeit still practical, nature such as the No Name raccoon-proof garbage pail, with steel handles that clamped to the sides of the container. But most No Name items continued to be everyday products, with the brand promoted as "a sensible solution to rising prices." By the end of the decade there were more than 1,800 No Name products available.

By the mid-1980s, No Name had become the best selling brand in the country and had achieved such prominence in spite of being available only in Loblaw owned stores. Media reports attributed much of that success to Dave Nichol and his marketing efforts. "Under Nichol's supervision, the country's No Name products have become the largest-selling national brand in Canada, one of the few countries in the world where generic brands compete with well-known names", wrote Maclean's. But according to Nichol, the big name brands were also vulnerable:

I happened to come along at a time when the national brands had prostituted the quality of their products. It is so easy to produce products that are superior to almost every national brand.

In the 1980s, No Name diverged from its original plain packaging as red lettering and various product illustrations were added. Meanwhile, a 1987 segment of the CTV Television Network show Live It Up! took the position that the line's product packaging wasn't doing enough to adequately distinguish relatively harmless cooking sprays from more dangerous cleaning products. During that same program, a Loblaw executive presented the company's solution – a No Name spray canister with a red cap to indicate potentially harmful contents.

In the 1990s, photography was increasingly incorporated as No Name packaging became more elaborate and less distinguishable from national brand products. Additional formats were also introduced, such as "No Name Club Pack" and promoted as "No Membership Required" in order to compete with 'big box' membership-based competitors who offered bulk items at reduced prices.

With the increasing popularity of the President's Choice brand through the 1980s and 1990s, attention and advertising dollars shifted to Loblaw's premium line. Nevertheless, the number and range of No Name products grew. The generic line also continued to do well in consumer affairs testing as conducted by media outlets. A 1982 product comparison ranked No Name windshield washer fluid among the top four of eight tested as all "equally excellent", while No Name disposable diapers came in a close second to Dominion's generic label, beating out the national brands. A 1989 Toronto Star taste testing panel ranked No Name freshly roasted ground coffee fourth out of eleven different nationally available brands.

== Relaunch ==
In 2009, Loblaws re-launched No Name, "the iconic brand and its unmistakable plain black printing on yellow packaging". New product packaging included a return to black Helvetica lettering on a yellow background, along with some limited product illustration. Loblaws executive David Primorac said the company decided to bring back the original colour palette as something familiar to shoppers. "It's something recognizable and it's easy for consumers." Also, for the first time since the early 1990s, No Name television commercials were aired which showed Loblaws Executive Chairman Galen G. Weston in a shopping cart comparison reminiscent of the Dave Nichol commercials of the early 1980s:

Pointing at the cart of "top selling no name products" and then the cart filled with "26 comparable national brands", Weston says the national brands cost $100.38 in its stores, while the No Name brands cost just $73.91. That's a savings of $26.46, he adds. (Based on average prices from May 25 to November. 22 in 922 Loblaws-owned stores, the company notes in fine-print.) He then removes any risk involved in switching by saying if you don't like the no name version, Loblaws will give you your money back.

Weston also made reference to the economic recession, noting that these are "challenging times and you need real, no-nonsense ways to stretch your dollar". A later series of television commercials simply showed text on a yellow background with various promotional lines on how No Name "helps you save". One ad noted, "We don't have a single item under $2. We have 300." David Rosenberg, creative director for Bensimon Byrne, the Toronto agency which created the TV spots, commented that the ads were produced for a fraction of what a standard Canadian TV commercial costs.

With tougher economic times, the company has refocused its attention on its "control label" program. According to vice president Paul Uys, "private brands are very important in a recession." Noting the company's renewed competitiveness, he described how some national brands were infringing on the company's own frozen rising-crust pizza sales. Loblaws switched its product from the President's Choice label to No Name, dropped the price by a dollar and gave it prominent display space. Sales subsequently rebounded.

Since the launch of No Name in 1978, the generic line has expanded from the original 16 items to more than 2,900 different products.

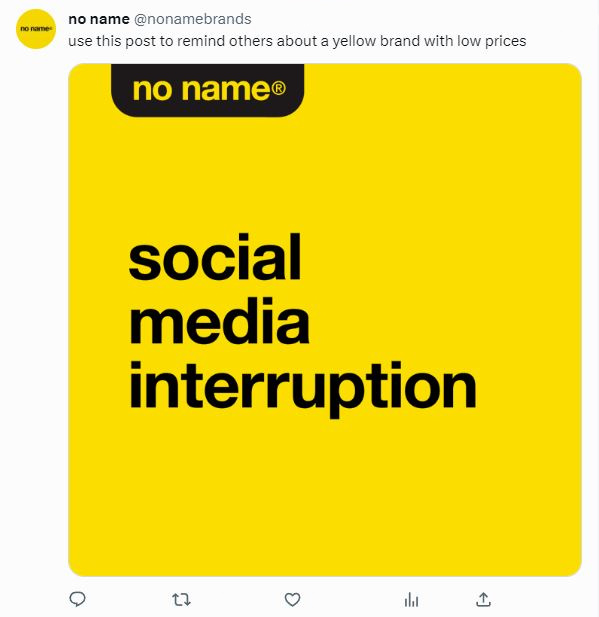
Example of a No Name social media ad, showcasing the simple and humorous style.

In 2019, Loblaw launched a multi-platform advertising campaign for No Name, with a focus on its "Simple Check" branding for No Name products produced without ingredients such as hydrogenated oil, or artificial colours and flavouring. The campaign relies primarily on self-referential humour relating to No Name's own branding and the clichés of the platform, such as social media posts containing deadpan quips regarding its products ("Social tea biscuits — can be consumed alone"), Twitter posts "liveblogging" the Primetime Emmy Awards with generic statements ("a winner has won again"), Toronto GO trains and a taxi cab with livery mimicking No Name's packaging and social media posts (with the former labelled "for going places"), and a television commercial taking place in a yellow kitchen with every item labeled in Helvetica, and a mom and her children labelled and referred to as "Relatable Adult", "Adorable Child #1", and "Adorable Child #2".

== Branded grocery stores ==
In August 2024, Loblaw announced a test market pilot project to open new No Name-branded hard discount grocery stores in the Ontario communities of Brockville, LaSalle (near Windsor), and St. Catharines the following month; the LaSalle location opened September 5. These stores featured shelf-stable and frozen items from the namesake product line and President's Choice, as well as a limited number of third-party brand products and select produce and bakery items, but unlike Loblaw's existing No Frills stores there were no refrigerated goods like milk or fresh meat.

The stores were based on a similar project that new Loblaw president Per Bank launched during his tenure with the Salling Group in Denmark; the Basalt stores closed after only seven months. Bank believed that Canadians would be more receptive to the concept because they are already used to visiting more than one store to fulfill their various grocery needs. He added that they would likely know within six months whether the concept works in Canada, following which Loblaw would decide whether to proceed with an accelerated rollout or pivot to other ideas.

In October 2025, Loblaw confirmed that it would be closing the LaSalle location that month, with a new No Frills store opening nearby soon after. The company also confirmed that the St. Catherines location had closed in July, but that the Brockville location would remain open for the time being.

== See also ==
- Yellow Pack (UK / Ireland)
- Value brands in the UK
- White-label products – similar products from other retailers
