= Don Watt (designer) =

Don Watt (9 February 1936 – 23 December 2009) created the Watt group, a retail branding and design consultancy. Some of the more recognized brand designs include Home Depot's orange logo and store concept, Sam's Choice, No Name and President's Choice. Watt was the first designer to use photosymbolism on packaging, for Nestle Instant Coffee.

== Biography ==
=== Early life ===
Don Watt was born in Regina, Saskatchewan. His father worked in the military and his mother would often paint pictures while his father was on duty, this inspired Don early on to pursue a career as an animator. He graduated from the Ontario College of Art for industrial design.

=== Career ===
Watt's first job after graduation was for A.V. Roe, working on the design for the Avro Arrow and the "flying saucer"—a special project for the U.S. Army. He went on to work for Warner Brothers in California, doing animation for Bugs Bunny, but then soon moved onto package design.

After working as a creative director for Hathaway-Templeton, where he worked on finalizing the design of the Canadian Flag, Watt founded Don Watt and Associates in 1966. Soon after, the firm landed the account to redesign the Nestle brand in Canada. During the early inception of the firm Watt also worked on the design of the Canadian Pavilion at Expo 67.

In 1973, Watt was hired by Galen Weston, to help resuscitate the Loblaws brand. Watt designed the brand, stores, packaging for "no name" generic products, "President's Choice" premium products, "Too Good to be True" nutritious healthy products and "Green" for environmentally friendly products.

Soon after the product launches, Watt suggested that then-current spokesperson William Shatner be replaced by Loblaws president Dave Nichol, after Shatner's availability became limited by his involvement in a new television series. The enhanced store flyer featuring Nichol's product picks, The Insider Report, soon followed.

In 1987, The Watt Group was recognized by the Harvard Business School for developing solutions to classic profit-improvement problems, using strategic design to effect change in consumer response. However, in 1992 Watt sold the somewhat ailing Watt Group to billion dollar company beverage maker Cott Corporation, to market branding to retailers across North America, Europe and Australia. From 1992 to 1999 The Watt Group flourished with the association with Cott. Cott CEO and major shareholder, Jerry Pencer attracted Gary Oakley as creative head; David Boyd, production guru, Richard Garvin, retail store designer, Patrick Rodmell, business development expert, and Ted Zittell, retail strategist. To lead this team, he engaged Ira Teich as CEO and Managing Director of the Watt Group. The Watt Group grew rapidly and profitably under this format until the death of Cott's founder and chief shareholder, Jerry Pencer in 1999.

==== Watt International ====
With the help of Envoy Communications, Watt bought back the Watt Group in 1999, renamed as Watt International, and merged it with the International Design Group (IDG) to expand the business's offering and better deliver his vision of holistic retail experiences.

Watt's namesake agency continues on this path, and today operates as a truly integrated retail agency. Beyond branding, store and packaging design, Watt International offers a broad range of strategically led creative services, addressing all of the channels and touchpoints that impact retail experience, be they physical or virtual, rational or emotional.

==== DW+Partners ====
In 2003 Watt, along with longtime business partner Geoff Belchetz, founded DW+Partners with St. Joseph Communications, a consulting firm specializing in retail branding and design. DW+Partners continued to work with Wal-Mart in the U.S. to re-design their Great Value line, which has since been redesigned by others.

In 2005 Watt developed the Super C brand and store design in Quebec for the Metro Group, and in 2007/2008 developed their "Irresistibles" premium packaging line.

Watt updated the Food Basics brand and store design in Ontario in 2008, after Metro Group acquired the Dominion and A&P business and created a new "Metro" brand identity for the corporation and he applied the Metro brand to Ontario stores, replacing the previous banners.

==== Legacy ====
In 2006, Watt was inducted into Canada's Marketing Hall of Legends under the category of Enablers–representing those who provide excellent brand-building expertise. In 2008, Watt was inducted into the Private Label Hall of Fame. He sat on the board of Aastra Technologies, Menu Foods, Pet Health, Cosmetic Essence, and Immunotec Research. Watt was a regular contributor to Private Label Magazine.

He died in 2009 after a stroke at the age of 73. After his death, DW+Partners was absorbed into St. Joseph Communications.
