= Premier (store) =

British symbol group

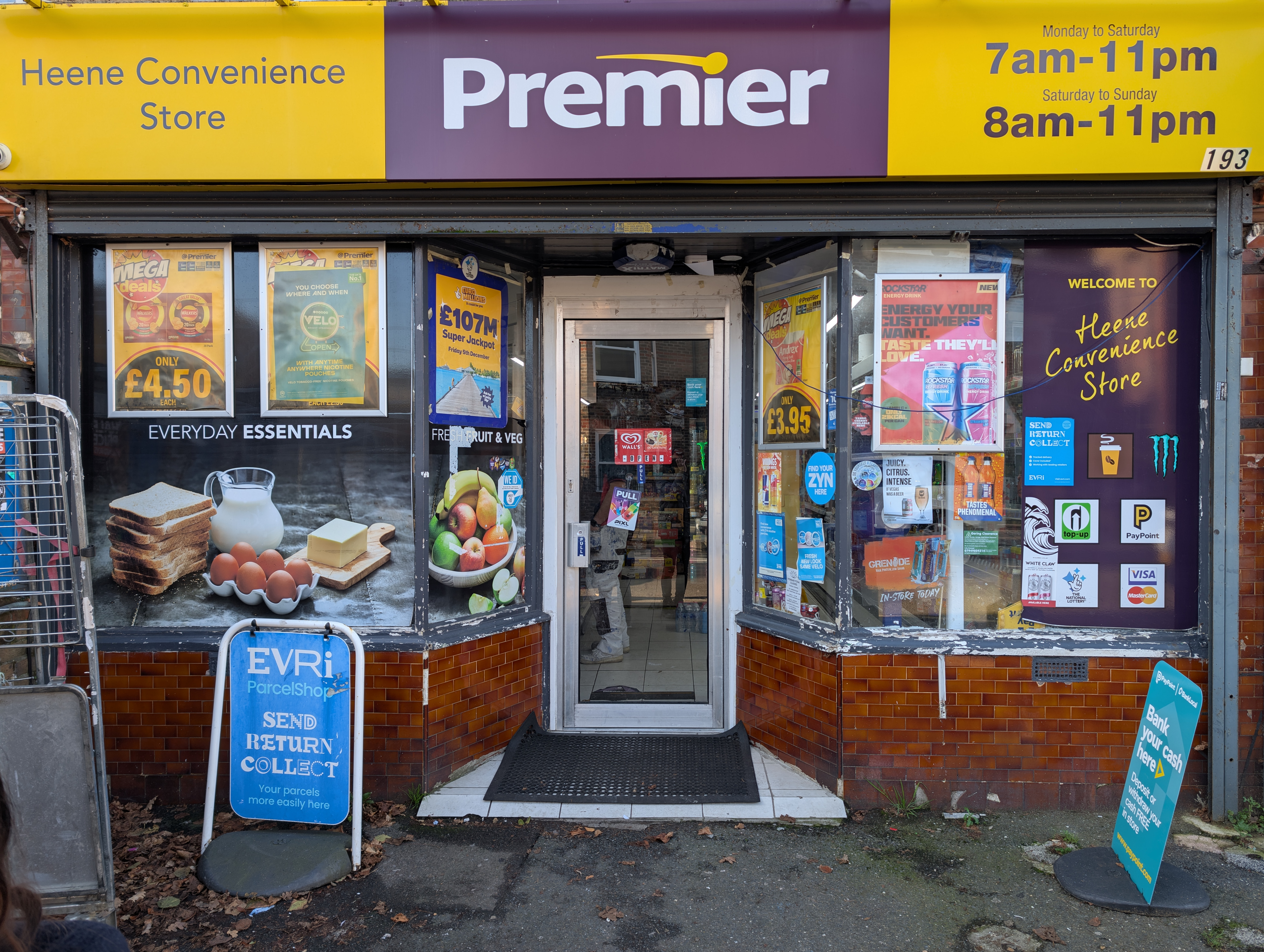
- A typical Premier store in Worthing, UK
- Type: Division
- Industry: Retail
- Founded: 1994; 32 years ago
- Headquarters: United Kingdom
- Number of locations: 4,369 (April 2024)
- Parent: Booker Group
- Subsidiaries: Premier (Hungary)
- Website: premier-stores.co.uk

Premier is a symbol group in the United Kingdom established in 1994, with over 4,000 stores nationwide. Tesco took ownership of the brand in 2018 after buying Booker Group.

Premier stores are generally convenience shops, stocking branded and own brand products, such as Euro Shopper and Jacks (part of the Tesco family) products.

Some Premier stores include a Post Office branch.

== See also ==
- Symbol group
- Convenience store
- Booker Group
- Londis
- Budgens
- One Stop
