= Dave Nichol =

Canadian businessman

David Alexander Nichol (February 9, 1940 – September 22, 2013) was a Canadian businessman and product marketing expert. As head of product development and eventually president of Loblaws Supermarkets, Nichol introduced the President's Choice store branded lines of products in the 1970s that propelled Loblaws from a struggling supermarket chain to an industry leader. For a time, as a pitchman for Loblaws, he became a recognizable Canadian business personality, largely due to his being featured in thirty-second commercials, and thirty-minute infomercials during the mid-1990s.

== Early life ==
He was born in Chatham, Ontario.

Nichol's father was a railway station agent, so the family moved around frequently.

Nichol completed his undergraduate degree at the University of Western Ontario’s School of Business (1962). He completed a law degree at the University of British Columbia and a Masters in Law from Harvard.

While at UWO, his roommate was Galen Weston Sr., from one of the richest families in Canada. Nichol was the best man at Weston's wedding.

== Career ==
Nichol's first job after Harvard was with McKinsey & Company's Toronto management consulting office.

=== Loblaws ===
In 1972, Galen Weston asked Nichol to help him with his family's supermarket chain, Loblaws. He joined the company that year as executive vice president.

In 1976, Nichol was promoted to president. He worked with Weston, Richard Currie, Brian Davidson and Don Watt to establish four retailer-branded product lines: "no name" for generic products; "President's Choice" for superior quality products; "Too Good to be True" ("TGTBT" as labeled) for nutritious healthy products; and "Green" for environmentally friendly products.

Throughout Nichol's association with President's Choice, Loblaw relied heavily on the executive's own palate when it came to product development. According to one newspaper report, "Dave's taste buds decree major business decisions." The Loblaw test kitchen was, in fact, situated next door to Nichol's office in central Toronto where it served as a crucible for product acceptance or rejection:

Nichol is stepping through his daily paces in Loblaw's airy, white test kitchen. Seven product-development staff hover watchfully. He forks a small sample of what appears to be chilli with meat into his mouth. The room falls silent. He closes his eyes. He swallows. He nods his head. The tension breaks. Dave likes it ... This is market research, Dave Nichol style. No focus groups. No marketing surveys. If the president of Loblaw International Merchants, the product-development arm of Loblaw Companies Ltd., likes the taste, it's in.

If an item met with Nichol's approval, and merchandisers expressed interest, it could be brought to market in a few months. If, on the other hand, Nichol was unimpressed, that usually meant the end of the line for an item. "He could kill a product with a shrug of indifference, and there was no court of appeal." Most product ideas were rejected or sent back to suppliers for modification while others went through numerous reformulations before getting the go ahead. Meanwhile, Nichol seemed to relish his role as ultimate arbiter. "Nothing gets called President's Choice without my approval", he once commented. "If you dislike any of them, then I'm the guy who has to take the blame."

Nichol was the company spokesman. He appeared in dozens of television commercials and radio spots promoting Loblaws products, most notably the President's Choice line. He starred in thirty-minute infomercials several times a year upon release of Loblaws Insider's Report periodical, of which he oversaw the development. This free publication, started in 1983, was an enhanced store flyer produced three times a year that marketed new products at discounted introductory prices. The Report "reflected his belief that success required not just great products, but great stories as well", Loblaw stated. "He always listened to the customer and kept their needs front-and-centre.

In 1985, Loblaws was reorganized and Nichol was made president of Loblaw International Merchants, the product development arm of Loblaw Companies Limited. He held that position for eight years.

Lines of new products were built around product names, for example the "Memories of" sauce products. He also introduced The Dave Nichol Cookbook, which sold some 100,000 copies.

Some products he touted are still sold, including the President's Choice Decadent Chocolate Chip Cookie, which was introduced in 1988.

In 1994, Anne Kingston released his authorized biography, The Edible Man: Dave Nichol, President's Choice & the Making of Popular Taste.

Nichol's relationship with Galen Weston Sr. had broken down when he departed Loblaws in 1994, but they later reconciled. Nichols consulted for Galen Weston Jr. who succeeded his father as head of Loblaw Companies Ltd. in October 2006.

=== Subsequent career ===
In 1994, Nichol became the CEO of Destination Products International, a subsidiary of Cott Corporation. For them he developed a line of unique premium food products that were offered to food retailers around the world under each retailer's own brand name. Nichol attempted to repeat his success as spokesman by naming a beer after himself, made by Cott, and marketing it in television commercials very similar in style to his old Loblaws President's Choice spots. However, his marketing and product success was not repeated at Cott, as the company struggled to expand under Nichol, whose taste "seemed to diverge too much from the mainstream" Moreover, without direct access to shelf space, which came at Loblaws, he "had a far more difficult time gaining entry, as a result spending an excessive amount of money to secure shelf space." Just before Nichol joined Cott, the stock had reached a high-water mark in 1993 at $35.00 a share, when Nichol left it was falling dramatically for a variety of reasons, hitting bottom at $3.00 in 1998.

In 1997, Nichol left Cott to form a consulting firm, Dave Nichol & Associates, creating specialty products sold under their own or clients' brand names. However, his public profile diminished significantly and his once stellar marketing reputation with the consumer faded.

In 2005, Nichol was inducted as a Visionary into the Hall of Canadian Marketing Legends by the American Marketing Association. He was cited for "[changing] the retail landscape forever and has done so in a sustainable and meaningful way. A lifelong passion for food has translated into fundamental evolutions in the choices and quality of food products available to Canadian households."

== Death ==
Nichol died in Toronto on September 22, 2013, at the age of 73.
