= Theodore Loblaw =

Canadian grocer (1872–1933)

- Born: Theodore Pringle Loblaw; July 1, 1872; Elmgrove, Ontario, Canada
- Died: April 2, 1933 (aged 60); Toronto, Ontario, Canada
- Occupation: Grocer
- Known for: Co-founder of Loblaws
- Spouse: Isabella Adam (m. 1897)

Theodore Pringle Loblaw (July 1, 1872 – April 2, 1933) was a Canadian grocer. He is best known as the co-founder of the Loblaws chain of grocery stores.

== Biography ==
Loblaw was born in Elmgrove, northeast of Alliston, the son of William John Loblaw and Isabella Stevenson Johnson. Following the death of his parents during his adolescence, Loblaw was raised by his maternal grandparents, William and Elizabeth Johnson, at their farm just outside Alliston. In the 1890s, he headed to Toronto to start a career in retail grocery. He later settled in Mimico and eventually purchased his grandparents' farm. He also sponsored the construction of Stevenson Memorial Hospital in Alliston to honour his grandparents.

Loblaw married Isabella Adam in 1897. The Loblaws had no biological children and were survived by their grand niece (Jean Agnes Loblaw 1917–1993) and nephews (Alexander Burr-Loblaw (1904–1978), John Burr-Loblaw (1906–1972) and James Fraser Burr-Loblaw (1910–1986).

Loblaw died at Toronto Western Hospital on April 2, 1933, and was buried at Alliston Union Cemetery in Alliston, Ontario.

== Creating Loblaws Groceteria ==
In 1919, Loblaw was hired by the United Farmers Cooperative Company (the purchasing agent of the United Farmers of Ontario co-operative) having previously co-managed a grocery store. He participated in an unsuccessful UFCC initiative to launch cooperative grocery stores. After leaving the company, he applied his experience to founding the grocery chain that became Loblaws.

== Toronto Western Hospital ==
Loblaw contributed to the establishment of the Toronto Western Hospital, as well as of the Stevenson Memorial Hospital in Alliston, which was named in honour of his grandparents.
