= Londis =

Londis or Londi may refer to:

- Londis (United Kingdom), a chain of convenience store franchises operating in the United Kingdom
- Londis (Ireland), a chain of convenience store franchises operating in Ireland
- Londi, village in Estonia
