= Generic brand =

Similar quality products sold without brand name recognition

Generic brands of consumer products (often supermarket goods) are distinguished by the absence of a brand name, instead identified solely by product characteristics and identified by plain, usually black-and-white packaging. Generally they imitate more expensive branded products, competing on price. They are similar to "store brand" or "private label" products sold under a brand particular to the merchant, but typically priced lower and perceived as lower quality. The terms off brand or brand X are sometimes used. In the United Kingdom, these products are often referred to as "own brand" items.

== Characteristics ==
Generics may be manufactured by less prominent companies or manufactured on the same production line as branded products. Generic brand products may be of similar quality as a branded product, and are commonly made from the standard ingredients used for branded products.

Without the costs of marketing individual products, generic brands are priced lower than branded products. They are preferred by customers for whom price or value-for-money is the priority. They are generally more popular in recessionary times, when consumers' purchasing power is lower, putting them on the lookout for value-for-money products; they experienced a period of popularity in the United States in the late 1970s and early 1980s, during a period of high price inflation.

Consumer perceptions about generic brands differ widely. A generic brand skin care product may have a consumer unsure about its "health and safety" quotient. This implies that there are certain product categories more aligned to generic brands. Examples include over-the-counter medications, cereal and gasoline among others.

The German discount supermarket Aldi is known for their own brand goods and absence of branded goods with minor exceptions.

There has been a growth in demand for generic brand goods since the late-2000s, and the stigma of the absence of a brand name is declining with time; as food inflation reaches new highs in 2022, and sales of branded food products decline.

== In popular media ==
The 1984 film Repo Man highlighted the then-new trend of generic brands with a running sight gag of products labeled generically, such as a beer can labeled 'Beer', a can labeled 'Drink', and a can of food labeled 'Food'.

== See also ==
- Acme Corporation
- Generic drug
- No Name, a private brand by Canadian grocery supermarket managing Loblaw Companies styled after generic goods
- Store brand
- White label record
- White-label product
