= Loblaws =

Canadian supermarket chain owned by Loblaw Companies Limited

Loblaws Inc.

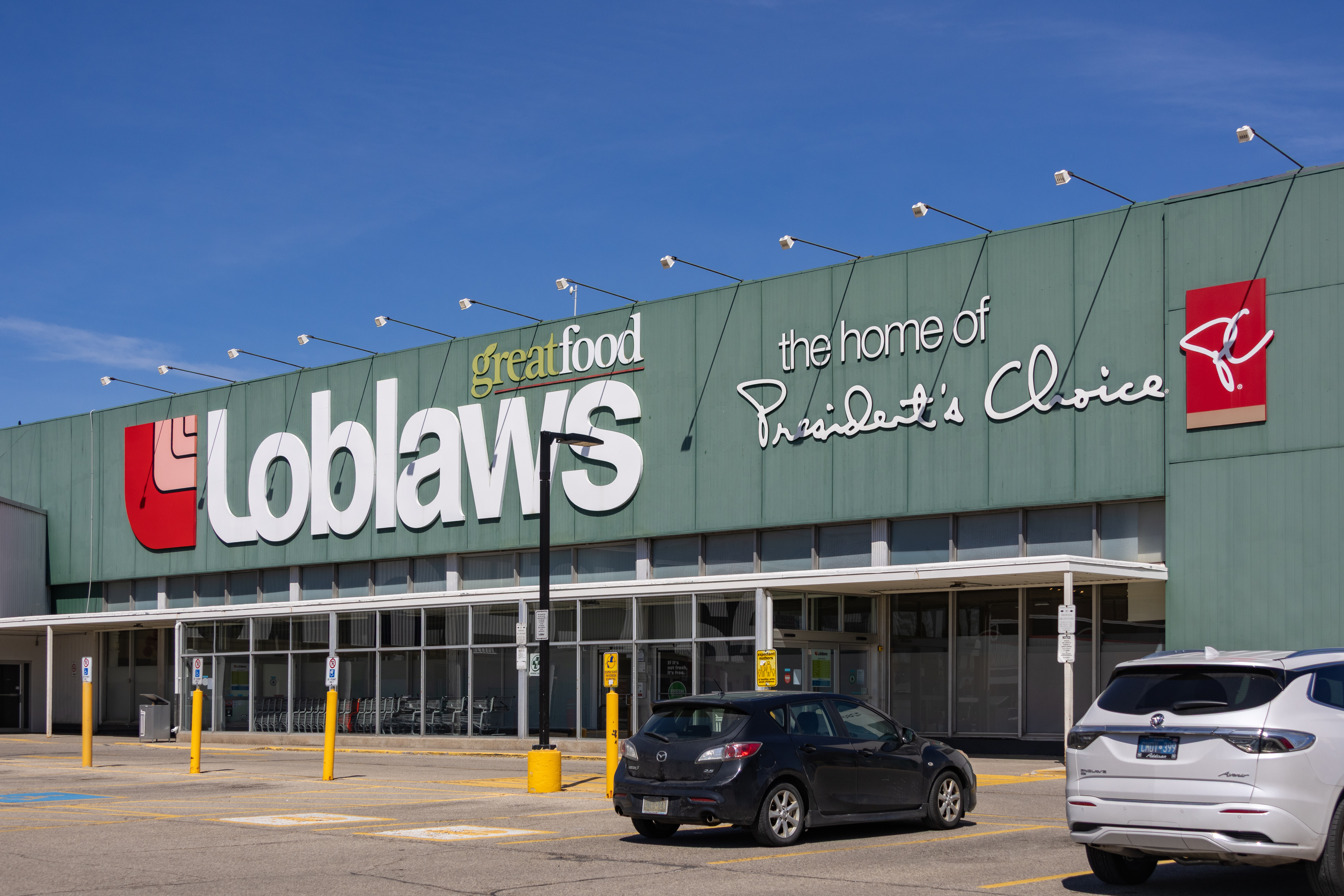
- A Loblaws location in Toronto
- Type: Subsidiary
- Industry: Retail; Supermarket
- Founded: June 1919; 107 years ago in Toronto, Ontario
- Founders: Theodore Loblaw; J. Milton Cork
- Headquarters: 1 Presidents Choice Circle, Brampton, Ontario, Canada
- Number of locations: 51 (2026)
- Area served: Alberta; British Columbia; Ontario
- Products: Appliances*, bakery, beer, charcuterie, clothing*, dairy, deli, frozen foods, gardening centre, gasoline*, general grocery, general merchandise, liquor*, meat & poultry, pharmacy, produce, seafood, snacks *Select locations
- Brands: No Name; President's Choice
- Services: Click and collect (PC Express), community room, dietitian, dry cleaning, fashion (Joe Fresh), optical, pharmacy, walk-in clinic (select locations)
- Parent: Loblaw Companies Limited
- Subsidiaries: Loblaws CityMarket
- Website: loblaws.ca

Loblaws Inc. is a Canadian supermarket chain with stores located in the province of Ontario, and in Alberta and British Columbia under the Loblaws CityMarket banner. Headquartered in Brampton, Ontario, Loblaws is a subsidiary of Loblaw Companies Limited, Canada's largest food distributor.

== History ==
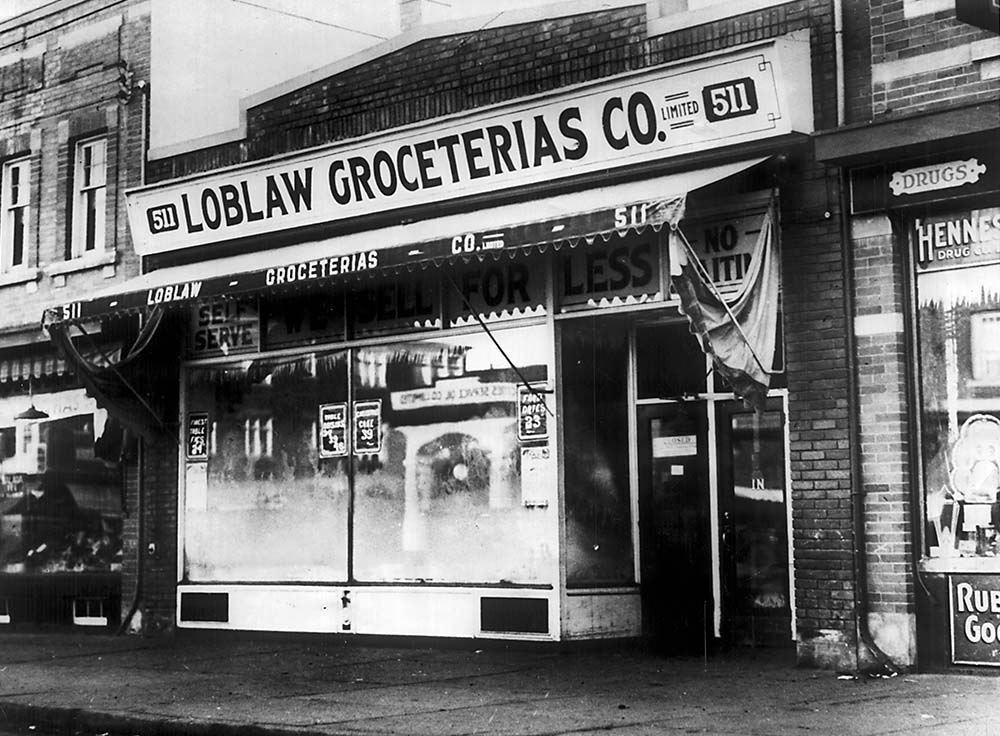
A Loblaws supermarket in Toronto in 1919

Loblaw Groceterias was founded by Theodore Loblaw and John Milton Cork in 1919. Loblaw opened the first Canadian self-service supermarket in Toronto in June 1919. During the 1920s the company grew throughout Ontario. By the 1930s it had 107 stores in Ontario and 50 in the state of New York.

In 1947, Garfield Weston struck a deal to acquire a block of 100,000 shares of Loblaw Groceterias Co. Limited, which had become one of the country's leading supermarket chains. By 1953, George Weston Limited had established majority control.

Loblaws stores operated across Canada until the early 1960s when most locations in western Canada were rebranded as SuperValu, and later as Real Canadian Superstore.

Retail sales and earnings were in decline in the 1970s as Loblaws' aging chain of supermarkets looked increasingly uncompetitive. The company initiated a broad marketing strategy that saw a prototype store renovated and remodelled in new colours and a new Loblaws logo. In the mid-1970s stores in the United States were sold to Bells Markets; however, some Loblaws stores in northwestern Pennsylvania continued operation into the early 1990s.

In 1996, in addition to revitalizing the look of its stores, Loblaw management earmarked $40 million for the development of its in-house, private-label program.

=== Super Centre ===
Super Centre was a hyper supermarket banner used by Loblaws during the 1990s in Ontario. Some stores were an expansion from the Super-Valu banner. These stores were about 60,000 to 120,000 square feet (5,600–11,100 m^{2}) in size on average, larger than standard supermarkets, sold a wider selection of merchandise (including department store merchandise, such as clothing), and contained in-store pharmacies. The initial concept was successful, but many of their locations failed as competition grew.

The concept was abandoned by the late 1990s with locations being downsized, re-branded as Loblaws stores and sold altogether. The brand survived in Atlantic Canada as Atlantic Superstore, now Real Atlantic Superstore.

=== 21st century ===
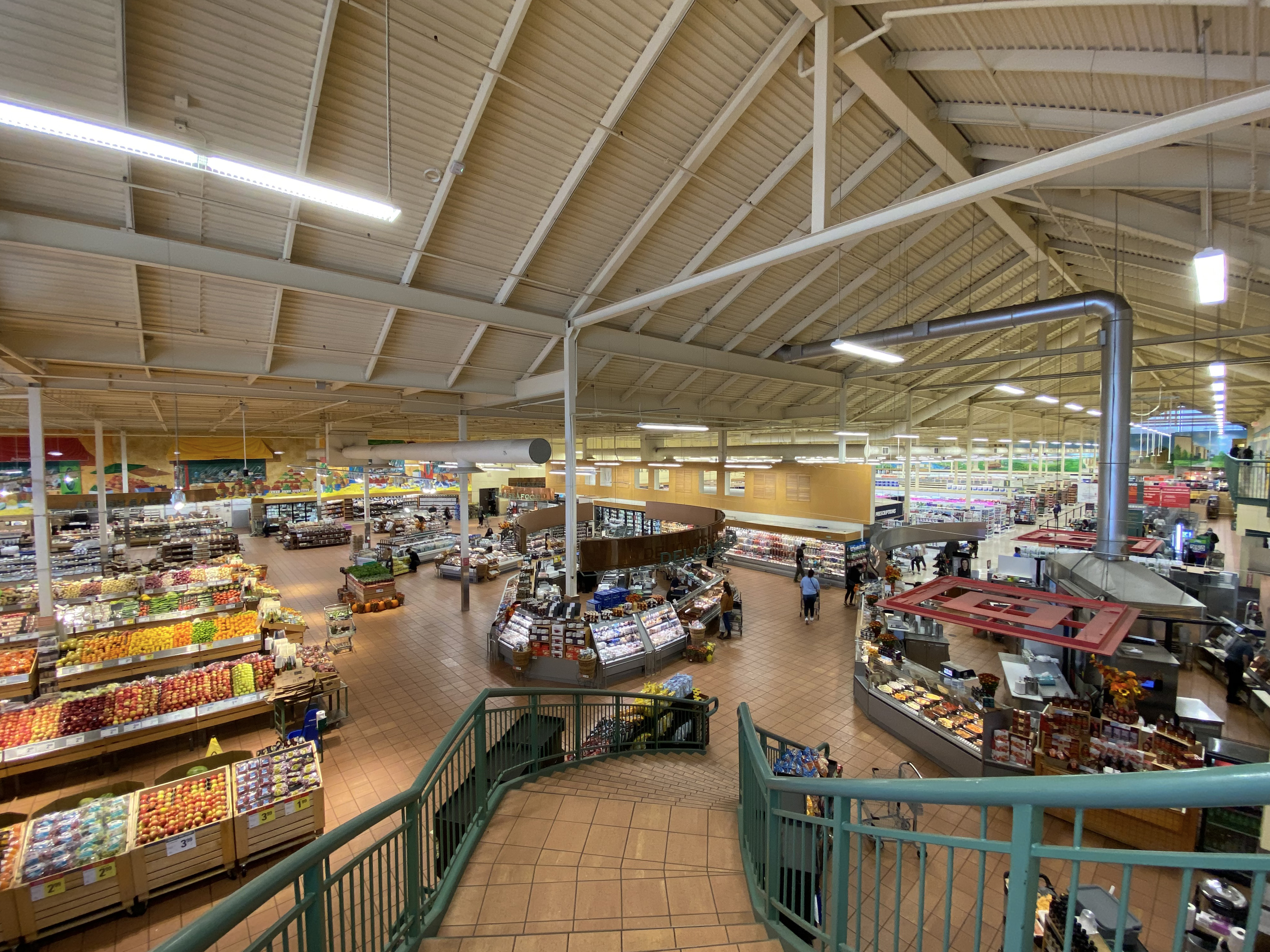
Interior of the Loblaws at Heartland Town Centre

Beginning in 2008, some new and renovated Loblaws stores were given a new store format and were named "Loblaw Great Food", dropping the red-orange curved-L logo. Stores under this banner are also subject to slightly different collective-agreement terms with the United Food and Commercial Workers, the union representing Loblaw employees.

The chain's location on the site of the former Maple Leaf Gardens in Toronto, opened in late 2011, is promoted as simply Loblaws and uses the familiar "L" logo, but is officially named "Loblaws Great Food", indicating that similar terms are in place at that store.

On July 19, 2013, Loblaws introduced their new concept "Loblaws CityMarket" in British Columbia (in North Vancouver, Richmond and Vancouver). Loblaws CityMarkets are now operational in Ontario, British Columbia and Alberta.

On July 23, 2015, Loblaws announced the planned closure of 52 non-profitable stores over the following year.

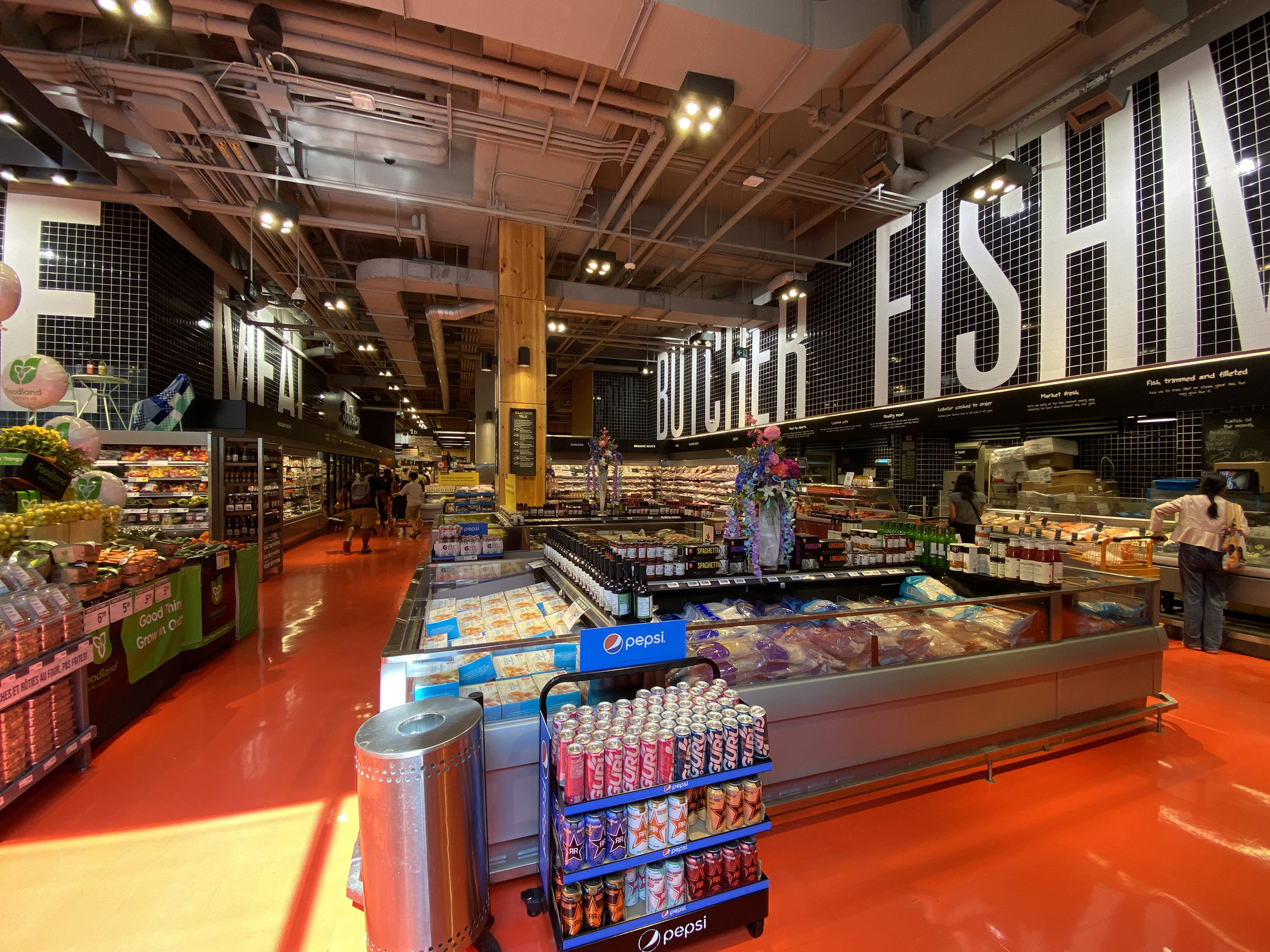
A Loblaws in Toronto Midtown in 2023

In December 2017, Loblaws and George Weston Limited disclosed to the Competition Bureau that it had arranged to fix the price of bread from 2000 to 2014. In response, the chain offered a $25 gift card to Canadian customers as a gesture of goodwill, but was met with public backlash over its restrictions and lack of remorse. The two companies agreed to pay $500 million to settle the lawsuit in July 2024, with the class action lawsuit against several other retailers continuing.

== Programs ==
Loblaws offers a grocery pickup service called PC Express where customers can order groceries online and select a time slot to pick up their orders. The rewards program used at Loblaws is PC Optimum which allows customers to accumulate points from purchases of certain items to be used in increments of ten dollars on purchases.

It is a participant in the voluntary Scanner Price Accuracy Code managed by the Retail Council of Canada.

== See also ==
- List of supermarket chains in Canada
- Dave Nichol
