= President's Choice =

Private label brand of the Loblaw Companies

- Current owner: Loblaw Companies
- Country: Canada
- Introduced: 1984
- Markets: Canada (except Nunavut)
- Website: www.presidentschoice.ca

President's Choice (French: le Choix du Président) or PC is a line of grocery products and services offered by the Canada-based Loblaw Companies Ltd.

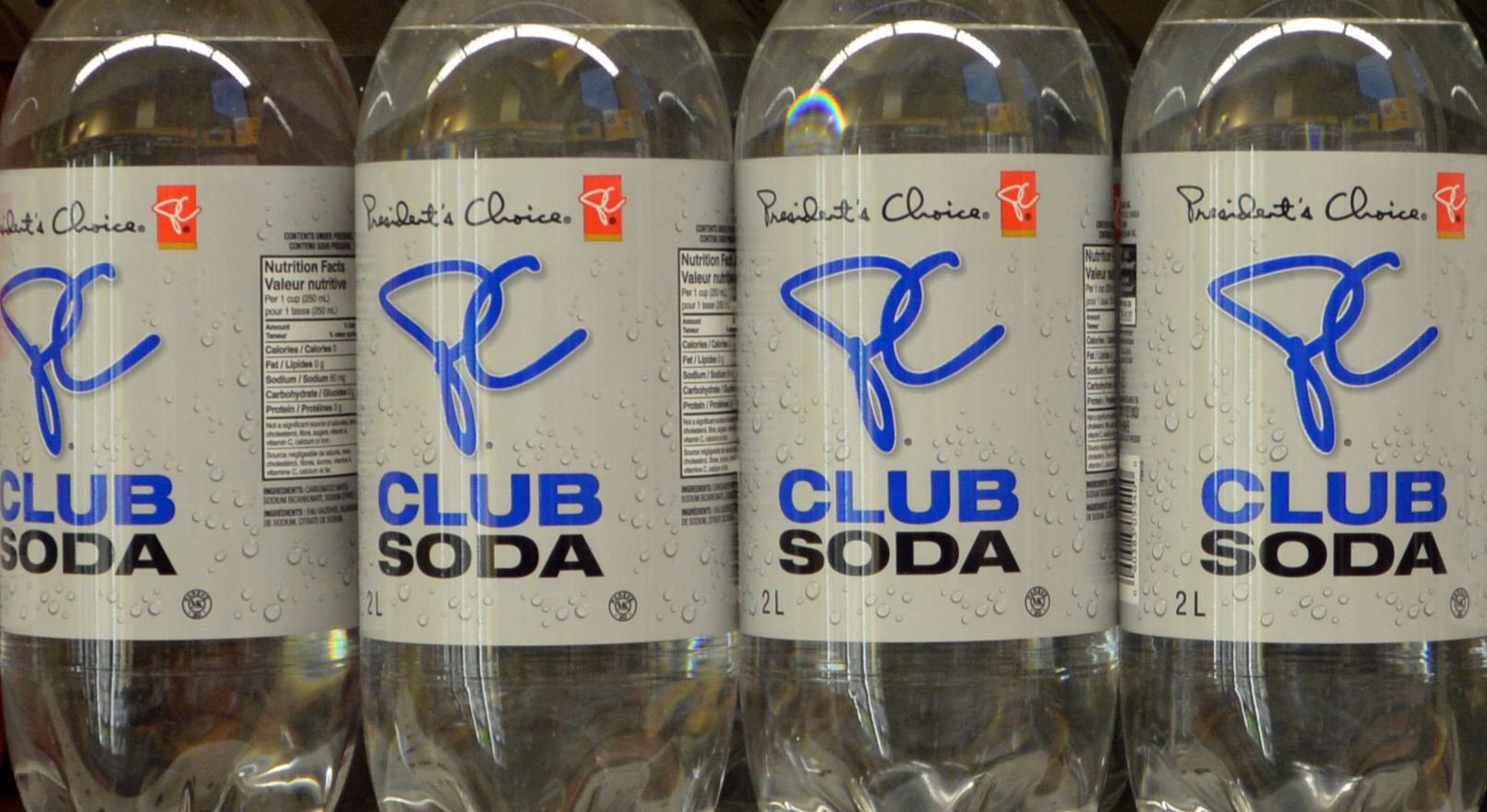
Presidents Choice (PC) Club Soda

== History ==
=== President's Blend ===
The first President's Choice (PC) products began appearing on Loblaw store shelves in 1984, but the concept was created the year before as the company marketed a new ground coffee. Dave Nichol, president of Loblaw Supermarkets, was looking for products to add to the company's lineup of No Name generic items and had even begun offering gourmet items in the familiar unbranded yellow packaging. Nichol's Louisiana buyers had discovered a new high-grade coffee, around the time some of the leading national brands had downgraded the quality of their store coffee. Toronto designer Don Watt was asked to create new packaging—the only stipulation being that it had to be yellow, similar to No Name packaging. Watt recalled how PC Gourmet Coffee went on sale by Christmas:

It goes on the shelf and becomes the number-one selling item in the grocery section. And Nichol, who was always listening to the consumer, said, "Well, I guess the consumer is telling us that we should be trading up. Why don't you take your President's Blend idea and figure out how to do a package? Because we've got a lot of yellow in the store, so the only comment I'm telling you is don't make it yellow."

Loblaw kept the "President’s Blend" label, but the name was otherwise too product-specific. Since the new line would be personally endorsed by Nichol, an associate suggested "President's Choice", a name that could be used for a wide range of items. According to Watt, "PC was chosen because it was the president's 'choice'. It wasn’t necessarily the absolute best that you would find in a gourmet deli or something—it was the best value, the best quality, the best relative to the competition." Nichol's association with the product line extended to almost every aspect of marketing, including the President's Choice logo, which was in Nichol's own handwriting.

=== Development ===
In developing a line of store-brand products, Loblaw looked to one of Great Britain's leading merchandisers for inspiration. "Nichol remembered seeing how London retailer Marks & Spencer had featured its own brand, St. Michael, which was not only less expensive but also higher in quality than the leading brands." For Nichol, private labels represented not only a marketing opportunity, and higher margins, but also a way of becoming less dependent on big-name national brands. "I started off running Loblaws like every other retailer in North America," he said, "which is getting people in the store by giving Coke and Tide away below cost."

Loblaw had a long history of in-house products. Founded by Toronto grocers Theodore Pringle Loblaw and J. Milton Cork in 1919, Loblaw Groceterias Co. Limited featured many of its own products, branded under a variety of labels such as Pride of Arabia Coffee and Jack & Jill Peanut Butter. While its innovative self-serve format produced rapid growth through its early years, by the 1970s Loblaw Companies Limited was struggling to revitalize its operations and recapture market share. As newly appointed CEO, W. Galen Weston earmarked $40 million for product development. With a major corporate rebranding underway, he commented that there was no point redesigning packaging if the consumer found the products' quality no better than before.

=== Insider's Report ===
The first Insider's Report was issued at the end of 1983, featuring Dave Nichol. Loblaws has continued to issue the annual report, now branded for President's Choice. Issues are released during Summer and Winter seasons.

Some of the first PC products included Belgian biscuits, chocolate chip cookies, and passion fruit sorbet. The brand's advent coincided with a new marketing tool, Dave Nichol's Insider's Report, first published in November 1983. Described by Nichol as a cross between Mad and Consumer Reports that combined "zaniness and food tips in a comic book format", the newspaper supplement was a quirky, tongue-in-cheek product review modeled after flyers from California supermarket chain Trader Joe's.

As the popularity and number of PC products grew, the Insider's Report became increasingly devoted to the PC line. With its cover shot of Nichol with Georgie Girl, his favorite French bulldog, it was written in the first person, with Nichol telling his readers about his latest food related finds and product quests. He often related stories on how certain products were developed.

Nichol and his developers travelled extensively in search of new ideas. One such excursion bought them to the boardroom of one of Europe's leading biscuit makers:

During our visit to their plant in Belgium, we discovered that Delacre is the world's largest producer of tinned assortments of premium biscuits. So then and there we put in the challenge to them: "Let's create the best assortment of tinned biscuits in the world." To accomplish this, Delacre laid all of its most costly biscuits on a table along with empty 1 kg tin. We then proceeded to fill it with a selection of your favourites – both dark and milk chocolate. Bichocs, cigarettes russes, etc., etc When we were done the President of Delacre look at it and said, "This assortment has more chocolate than any of our other assortments – it's definitely our best."

Throughout the Insider's Report, Nichol promoted PC as good as or better than the national brand at substantially lower prices, often drawing direct comparisons to competitors' products.

For Loblaw's management, the PC sales strategy surpassed simply competing with national brands; its ability to draw customers into stores was considered important. Nichols said, "We're trying to create products that you can't get anywhere else, so you’ll have to come to our stores!" The approach led to unique items such as PC Gourmet Italian Dog Foods, and lines such as "The Decadent" products and "Memories of" sauces. And while not all successes originated with Nichol, many did:

Nichol had some stunningly creative ideas. When, for instance, he tasted a satay sauce at a restaurant at Bali, he put his staff to work replicating it, sending them back to the kitchen time and again until they got it right ... Memories of Szechwan Peanut Sauce & Dressing has outsold ketchup in some Loblaw stores.

=== The Decadent ===
Nichol loved chocolate and cookies. When it became known that another brand was trying to create a cookie to compete with PC's Chocolate Chip Cookies for the Connoisseur, he decided he wanted to develop "the ultimate chocolate chip cookie". Though there were concerns about the practicality of introducing more natural ingredients, the decision was made to use real chocolate chips and real butter instead of hydrogenated oil (typically used for longer shelf life). But this presented its own challenges, such as how to stop chocolate chips from melting all over the production line. It took supplier Colonial Cookie of Kitchener, Ontario, more than a year to create a product that met Nichol's standards. Colleague Jim White was the first to sample it:

When the first samples arrived, I asked Jim White to try them. "Are they good?" Jim's eyes glazed over [and he said] "They're beyond good—they're truly decadent."

On its release, The Decadent Chocolate Chip Cookie contained 39% chocolate chips by weight, more than double the leading national brand. It soon became the best selling PC product, and within three years was Canada's best-selling cookie, even though it was available in only 20% of Canadian food stores.

Not all PC products were hits. Lucullan Delights, a vanilla crème sandwich cookie designed to compete with Oreos, was introduced a year before The Decadent. Nichol saw a food critic's reference to Lucullus, a 1st Century B.C. Roman senator famous for his lavish banquets, and decided to use the name. However, sales were slow as shoppers apparently struggled to make sense of the name, even with an explanatory note on the packaging. In 1992, the product was reformulated and relaunched as the "Eat The Middle First" cookie, with Nichol's guarantee that if you didn't like it, he'd give you a bag of Oreos for free. Sales subsequently rose.

=== G.R.E.E.N ===
In the spring of 1989, Loblaw introduced G.R.E.E.N, a new line of environmentally friendly and body friendly PC products—the first major North American company to offer a "green" product line. The items ranged from unbleached coffee filters to organic lawn and garden fertilizer. In the June issue of Insider's Report, Nichols wrote how surprised he was at public interest in such products. He explained how his team had met with executives of Canada's leading environmental groups to ask them what products they would like to see. However, he cautioned, "We accept the fact that ... not all environmental groups will agree with all our President's Choice G.R.E.E.N products". The new line was soon criticized by a number of groups. Greenpeace took exception to G.R.E.E.N's organic fertilizer, maintaining that it was not completely toxin-free. The Consumers Association charged that some items were no different than products already on store shelves. There was further controversy when Colin Isaacs, executive director of Pollution Probe, appeared on TV with Nichol to provide a qualified endorsement of non-chlorine bleached disposable diapers, saying that if you had to use disposables, these were the ones to buy. Isaacs soon resigned as other environmentalists objected to any endorsement of a throw-away product. While Nichol defensive at times, he contended that events had actually helped promote G.R.E.E.N:

"The real success of the green story is the enormous controversy it caused", he says. "Within four weeks we had an 85% awareness level, and 27% of the people actually had bought the products." After a minute of reflection he adds, "Controversy is a wonderful thing."

Loblaw president Richard Currie pointed out that following the introduction of the line, a flood of "green" products by other manufacturers hit the market. A year later, the number of G.R.E.E.N products had reached 100, with another 50 planned; however, product development eventually slowed. Nichol later lamented that it was difficult finding green products to bring to market.

=== Growth ===
By 1990, the number of PC products had reached 500. Meantime, Dave Nichol's Insider's Report, which, according to an A.C. Neilson survey, was read by 59% of Ontario households, had become almost exclusively devoted to the promotion of PC, which now represented $1.5 billion in sales, or 20% of Loblaw's annual revenue.

Nichol continued to pursue product categories where he felt PC could make alternatives to Coca-Cola. Years later, the 2004 launch of PC New Wave Cola featured blue and white packaging, with a "Join the New Wave Generation" ad campaign "calling all Pepsi Cola Fans" to switch brands.

In November 1991, Too Good To Be True! was launched, with 50 healthful low-fat products. "Dave Nichol’s Barbecue Secrets" video, on outdoor cooking with PC products, sold some 55,000 copies.

Throughout Nichol's association with PC, his own palate played a major part in product development. One newspaper report said, "Dave's taste buds decree major business decisions." The Loblaw test kitchen, next door to Nichol's office in central Toronto, served as crucible for product acceptance or rejection:

Nichol is stepping through his daily paces in Loblaw's airy, white test kitchen. Seven product-development staff hover watchfully. He forks a small sample of what appears to be chilli with meat into his mouth. The room falls silent. He closes his eyes. He swallows. He nods his head. The tension breaks. Dave likes it ... This is market research, Dave Nichol style. No focus groups. No marketing surveys. If the president of Loblaw International Merchants, the product-development arm of Loblaw Companies Ltd., likes the taste, it's in.

If an item had Nichol's approval, and merchandisers expressed interest, it could be brought to market in a few months. If he was unimpressed, it usually meant the end of the line for that item. "He could kill a product with a shrug of indifference, and there was no court of appeal." Most ideas were rejected or sent back to suppliers for modification, while others went through numerous reformulations before getting the go-ahead. Meanwhile, Nichol relished his role as ultimate arbiter. "Nothing gets called President's Choice without my approval", he said. "If you dislike any of them, then I'm the guy who has to take the blame."

Nichol and associates also paid close attention to packaging. Though Don Watt produced early versions of it, others, such as Loblaw art director Russ Rudd, created many of the most successful designs. For The Decadent Chocolate Chip Cookie, Rudd lined up hundreds of cookies on a conference table and photographed the best-looking ones. An enlargement of one cookie became the cover shot, with dozens of chocolate chips forming the background. Sometimes unconventional stock photos were used to represent a product's unique nature. A fierce-looking Japanese Kabuki actor in heavy theatrical make-up became the image for PC's Memories of Kobe line; and the penetrating eyes of a veiled woman, from a fashion shoot, became that of PC Memories of Ancient Damascus Pomegranate Sauce. Nichol apparently enjoyed using images other food manufacturers would never consider.

=== U.S. and other markets ===
While PC became increasingly popular among Canadian consumers, it was still largely unknown in the United States. In fact, U.S. stores owned by Loblaw in St. Louis, Missouri and New Orleans, Louisiana never carried the line. By the late 1980s, Don Watt, working on design contracts for a number of US supermarket chains, became something of an "unofficial ambassador" for PC. Nichol, who regarded the US market as "a great opportunity", considered "going global" the next logical step. He told of how international executives who toured Loblaw stores would ask whether the company's private label program was for sale. But while Loblaw pitched PC as a higher-margin alternative to the national brands, putting PC products on US retailers' shelves proved more complicated:

[Nichol] brought in a man named Tom Stephens to sign deals with regional grocers like D'Agostino in New York and Jewel in Chicago. He told them a strong store brand would free them from the tyranny of manufacturers. Many US grocers scoffed at the idea, calling it "Canadian lunacy", Stephens remembers. "The stores that took President's Choice ... were either desperate or brilliant."

As PC began making inroads, Loblaw aired a series of primetime infomercials in Buffalo, New York with Nichol and marketing executive Boris Polakow. In 1991, PC products were available in only a handful of US states. A little more than two years later, they were on the shelves of some 1,200 stores in 34 states, due in large part to Walmart. PC had come to the attention of WalMart founder Sam Walton through Don Watt. After a year of meetings, a deal was struck where Loblaw agreed to develop a line of private-label products under the Walmart brands Sam's American Choice, later shortened to Sam's Choice, and Great Value. Described as "a big coup for Nichol", items such as "Sam's Cola" and "Sam's Over 39% Chocolate Chip Cookies" made their debut in 1991. The Toronto Star later reported that cola and cookies sales had "gone through the roof".

Loblaw also started making deals outside of North America. Holding a can of Australia's Choice Cola, Nichol appeared on the July 1993 cover of Canadian Business magazine, as Loblaw moved ahead with plans to market private labels for Coles Myer Limited (now Coles Group), Australia's largest food retailer. Loblaw also prepared to test-market PC products on the shelves of ParknShop, Hong Kong's second-largest supermarket chain. Deals in the UK, Sweden and South Africa were also in the works.

PC also began pursuing opportunities beyond grocery stores. In 1992, PC Premium Draft beer went on sale at Brewers Retail outlets in Ontario. Launched only weeks before Christmas, supplier Lakeport Brewing assured Loblaw, based on historical data, that it had enough product in stores for the holiday season. Advertised as "premium quality", yet value-priced, the beer sold out before Christmas, and Lakeport subsequently ran full-page ads apologizing for the shortfall. The success of PC beer confirmed to Nichol that he could sell almost anything under the brand as long as it represented better quality at a lower price:

If I sold you a PC tennis shoe, I think you would understand that I’m trying to give you a better tennis shoe at a lower price. The PC franchise is expandable in any number of directions.

He referred to a "brand tax revolt" by consumers.

=== Nichol departs ===
In November 1993, Loblaw Companies Limited announced that Dave Nichol was leaving as president of Loblaw International Merchant, the company's control label division, to establish his own business as a consultant, and that he would remain as PC's spokesman. Nichol dismissed suggestions that his departure was anything but amicable, and said Loblaw did everything to convince him to stay in his present position, but that he felt somewhat constrained. He hosted one more issue of Dave Nichol’s Insider’s Report; then six months later was no longer associated with PC. He began promoting a number of Dave Nichol-branded products as the new president of controlled brands at Cott Corp., a private label soft drink maker. Loblaw president Richard Currie said the break was "neither positive nor negative" but “neutral”, and that the business did not require a spokesman.

=== PC after Nichol ===
The Dave Nichol's Insider’s Report became The Insider's Report, but looked much the same. Loblaw International Merchants, in charge of PC product development, merged with the company's buying division, Intersave, becoming Loblaw Brands Limited. Although Nichol's departure received considerable news coverage, media reports indicated little or no negative impact on Loblaw:

Since Nichol’s departed, Loblaw's profits have shown double-digit growth in five of six quarters. Total Loblaw’s sales in Canada were up 8.4% in 1995. Company brand sales – chiefly President’s Choice – were up 18.5%, well ahead of the average gain of 11% recorded by A.C. Nielsen of Canada Ltd. for 550 store-brand product categories.

In subsequent years, Loblaw continued expanding the number of PC products and extended it into new service-oriented areas. In 1998, Loblaw launched President's Choice Financial, promoted as a no-fee alternative in personal banking. A press report said, "It's the first time a major Canadian retailer has developed its own full-fledged banking services, which will be available to customers across the country within 18 months". Along with free savings and checking, it offered no-fee in-store banking, free groceries through its PC Points program, and mortgage and loan services. Though branded exclusively as President's Choice Financial, the Canadian Imperial Bank of Commerce acted as its "service provider". By 2010, PC Financial had 2.5 million customers and $20 billion in managed funds.

PC continued to add new products and lines. In 2001, PC Organics was introduced as a third-party certified line of organic food products, in accordance with the guidelines of the National Standard of Canada on Organic Agriculture. A year later, PC Home unveiled a collection of household accessories. In 2005, PC Blue Menu introduced a line of healthful and convenient food items, replacing the Too Good To Be True! line. PC Mini Chefs, a line of foods for kids, was also added.

=== Galen Weston ===
Older logo from the 2000s, still seen on some products

In October 2006, after a problematic corporate restructuring caused a string of losses, John Lederer resigned as president and Galen G. Weston assumed the new post of Executive Chairman of Loblaw Companies Limited. Within a year, he had taken on the role of spokesman for President's Choice. In a series of television commercials designed by Toronto advertising agency Bensimon Byrne, he appeared informally in shirtsleeves and, without reference to any corporate title, introduced himself simply as "Galen Weston". One of the first ads showed him promoting the new 99-cent PC GREEN reusable shopping bag, with the goal of reducing the number of plastic bags in Canadian landfills by a billion a year. Consumer response was strong, and the bag almost sold out in its first week. Company figures later indicated that, along with a new 5-cent charge per plastic bag, the use of over one billion disposable bags had been avoided. Commenting on his role as brand spokesman, Weston said he intended to focus on the environment and healthier food products. Subsequent television commercials included PC organic baby food, and a relaunched line of PC GREEN products.

Loblaw Companies Limited develops some 500 new food items each year, many of which become PC products. Suppliers regularly pitch new ideas, and the company also undertakes its own research and development. "We try to be ahead of the market", Loblaw vice president Paul Uys said. Loblaw vice president of food Pietro Satriano said the company's labels remain crucial to its overall strategy. "In the end, it drives people to our stores. It drives loyalty. People can't get them anywhere else. It's tough to quantify, but it's crucial." There are currently more than 2,000 PC products on Canadian supermarket shelves.

== Product lines ==
In Canada, PC products are generally sold only at Loblaw-owned or affiliated stores. A notable exception is PC beer, which in Ontario is also sold at The Beer Store and the LCBO's retail stores (and was available only at those retailers until 2015, due to since-changed provincial laws on alcohol sales).

In addition to the main PC line, the brand also has nine specialized lines:

- Teddy's Choice products for infants
- Mini Chefs food for 5- to 10-year-olds
- Organics organic food
- Free From meat products raised without antibiotics or hormones (most Free From chicken is also vegetable- and grain-fed with no animal byproducts)
- Blue Menu food marketed to health-conscious consumers, often with lower fat content and ingredients such as whole grains
- Green products marketed as more "environmentally-friendly" (for example, ads for PC GREEN Toilet Bowl Cleaner state it is "100% chlorine-free" for "fewer toxic substances going into our water")
- Black Label high-end, specialty products
- Farmer's Market fresh produce and in-store thawed baked goods
- Planet First biodegradable and sustainable single-use products, made of bamboo and wood. (Includes; cutlery, plates, bowls, straws).

== Eat Together marketing campaign ==
In 2017, PC began their Eat Together campaign, focusing on the idea that sharing meals increases happiness and is generally beneficial for people. The campaign uses a new slogan each year, focusing on societal issues such as disconnection due to technology, eating alone in the workplace, and social media influence. In 2019, in addition to encouraging people to look away from their screens to spend more time with family, it encouraged them to "live in the present moment" rather than focusing on social media. The campaign included short commercial videos. The initial online campaign (2017) received over 11 million views and 27,000 shares. In 2019, the annual commercial received 1.1 million views within its first two months.

PC's 2021 Eat Together commercial was a 90-second film that features British-American philosopher Alan Watt's speech “The Dream of Life”, with landscapes, and people participating in sports and other life experiences.

== Types of products ==
PC products include food products such as:

- Prepared foods – including baby food, canned foods, soups, condiments
- Grain products – including breads, cereals, grains, rice
- Dairy products – yogurt, cheese, etc.
- Frozen food – frozen desserts, entrees, meats
- Drinks – juice, soda, water, coffee, lemonade, tea, beer
- Fresh foods – including deli products, meat, poultry, fresh pasta, produce, seafood
- Snacks – crackers, snack foods, chips, dips, sauces

...and non-food items such as:

- Pet foods and supplies
- Baby products
- Bath and body-care products
- Cleaning and household products
- Laundry supplies
- Paper and office products
- Other general merchandise

...as well as:

== PC in the United States ==
President's Choice began appearing in US supermarkets in the early 1980s. In the Chicago area it was featured on the shelves of Jewel stores under an exclusive regional marketing agreement.

From around 1995 to 1999, Lucky Stores carried PC products until it was acquired by Albertsons.

Acme Markets carried PC products until they were acquired by Albertsons in 1999.

Phoenix, Arizona–based Smitty's Supermarkets carried the PC brand in the 1990s.

The Modesto, California–based New Deal Market chain carried PC products for a short time under their ownership by Canada-based Provigo Corp.

Michigan-based Glen's Market carried PC products from the late 1990s through the early 2000s, and had special coupons and promotions around the line. One of the promotions provided a free pint of ice cream on the birthdays of customers with a registered Glen'sCard. D&W Food Centers carried the PC brand for several years before it was purchased by Spartan Stores, Inc.

Michigan-based Great Scott! supermarkets carried the PC line before it was acquired by Kroger in 1990. Kroger then sold PC products in its Michigan stores for a short time (presumably until a contract to carry the product expired).

During the 1990s, Stop & Shop supermarkets in Quincy, Massachusetts, carried PC products, as did Cambridge, Massachusetts–based Star Market before it was acquired by Shaw's Supermarkets in 1999. Shaw's ceased carrying PC products in its Star-branded stores following the acquisition.

Portland, Oregon–based Fred Meyer stores also carried the PC brand for a time.

Charlotte, North Carolina–based Harris Teeter carried the PC brand in the 1990s.

St. Louis–based National Supermarkets, then owned by Loblaw, introduced PC along with other Loblaw-owned chains. It continued until the chain was purchased by competitor Schnucks in 1995, which continued carrying it until 1998.

Des Moines, Iowa–based Hy-Vee carried the PC brand until 1999.

Minneapolis-based Nash Finch Company carried the PC brand in its corporate owned stores, such as Econofoods in the early 2000s.

PC products were also carried by Bell's Markets in western New York, when they were supplied by a company affiliated with Loblaw. They were later carried by Tops Friendly Markets in that area, but are no longer found there.

Houston, Texas–based Randalls Food Markets carried PC products until their acquisition by Safeway Inc. in 1999., as did its sister chain Tom Thumb in Dallas-Fort Worth.

== See also ==
- List of Canadian mobile phone companies
- Dave Nichol
