= Galen Weston =

British-Canadian billionaire businessman (1940–2021)

Galen Weston OC CVO OOnt
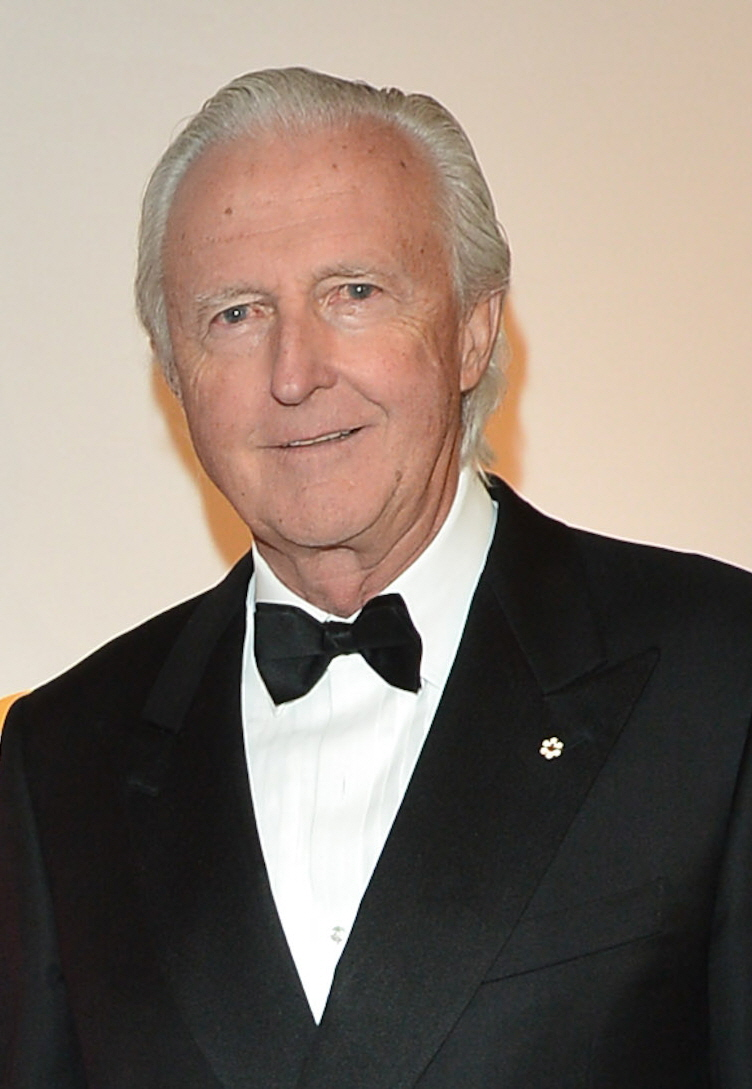
- Weston at the Canadian Film Centre Gala in February 2013
- Born: Willard Gordon Galen Weston; October 29, 1940; Marlow, Buckinghamshire, England
- Died: April 12, 2021 (aged 80); Toronto, Ontario, Canada
- Education: St Paul's School, London University of Western Ontario
- Occupation: Businessman
- Title: Chairman Emeritus of George Weston Limited; Chairman of The W. Garfield Weston Foundation
- Spouse: Hilary Frayne (m. 1966)
- Children: Alannah; Galen
- Relatives: W. Garfield Weston (father); George Weston (grandfather); Garry Weston (brother)

Willard Gordon Galen Weston OC CVO OOnt (October 29, 1940 – April 12, 2021) was a British-Canadian billionaire businessman and Chairman Emeritus of George Weston Limited, a Canadian food processing and distribution company. Weston and his family, with an estimated net worth of US$8.7 billion, were listed as the third-wealthiest family in Canada and 178th in the world by Forbes magazine in June 2019.

In addition to being one of the country's leading bakers through wholly owned subsidiary Weston Foods, he was an experienced supermarket retailer who maintained a controlling interest in Loblaw Companies, Canada's largest food retailer, through a family holding company. Weston was also head of the world's second-largest luxury goods retailer as chairman of Holt Renfrew in Canada and the Selfridges Group, owner of Selfridges in the United Kingdom, Brown Thomas in Ireland, the De Bijenkorf department store chain in the Netherlands, and the Ogilvy department store in Montreal. Weston was chairman of The W. Garfield Weston Foundation, a Canadian charitable foundation that has made close to $200 million in donations over the past decade.

== Early years ==
Weston was born to Reta Lila (Howard) and W. Garfield Weston at Marlow in Buckinghamshire, approximately 30 miles (48 km) west of London, on October 29, 1940 – the youngest of nine children. Garfield Weston, a Canadian businessman whose father George Weston established George Weston Limited, had successfully expanded overseas during the 1930s by acquiring and modernising biscuit and bread factories throughout the United Kingdom. In 1945, Weston and his family returned to Canada but moved frequently as his father pursued various business ventures, which included supermarket chains in North America and Europe. Growing up, Weston worked in the stores that comprised his father's retail holdings. He once noted, "I've been a bag boy a thousand times in five languages." Between 1954 and 1959, he was educated in the United Kingdom at the elite London school, St Paul's.

== Ireland ==
In 1962, after briefly studying business administration at Huron University College at the University of Western Ontario, Weston moved to Dublin to set up a grocery store. A second location followed, and the outlets evolved into the Powers chain of supermarkets. Weston found the Republic of Ireland a land of opportunity:

Southern Ireland in the early Sixties, in terms of growth, was where the real opportunities existed. The population was coming to Dublin, the European Community was becoming more and more aware of Ireland. Lemass was beginning to take a different perspective upon capital coming into the country and it looked like there was going to be a major opportunity for growth.

By 1965, Weston's business had grown to six grocery stores. Four years later, he expanded his business interests with the purchase of a bankrupt department store called Todd Burns, which he renamed Penneys (now known as Primark outside of Ireland). Within a year, four more stores opened, all with a similar discount format. Two years later, the first Penneys outside of Dublin was launched, followed by eleven more stores, including one in Northern Ireland. Meanwhile, Weston married Hilary Frayne, one of Ireland's top fashion models, in 1966.

In the early 1970s, Weston expanded his grocery holdings with the acquisition of competitor Quinnsworth. In 1971, Weston purchased an interest in Brown Thomas, the upscale Dublin department store, and gave it to his wife as a present. They eventually acquired full ownership in 1984.

== Loblaw ==
In 1971, Weston was asked by Garfield Weston, Chairman of George Weston Limited, to take a look at Loblaws, the company's Ontario-based supermarket chain, which appeared headed for bankruptcy. He found a company deeply in debt with too many small, aging outlets, and a market share recently cut in half. "The big question then was should this chain be closed up or should we make the enormous investment in money and time to return it to its former place. I felt that from a retailing standpoint Loblaws was the nucleus of potentially the finest company in Canada."

In February 1972, Weston was appointed chief executive officer of Loblaw Companies and immediately began consolidating operations. Financing was arranged through a Weston family holding company to free Loblaws from store leaseback agreements. Within a year, 78 money-losing locations were closed down. Weston noted that, "as a 200-store chain, we didn't look very good. As a 100-store chain, we looked very good indeed."

Weston next hired designer Don Watt to remodel one of the chain's Toronto outlets on a budget of only $30,000. "Loblaws is in such trouble that if it doesn't work, it doesn't matter. If it works – good." The new store featured an expanded produce section moved upfront with huge photographs of fresh fruits, vegetables, meats and baked goods. It used panelling and big moveable display bins, in addition to new colours and logo. Sales dramatically increased. Loblaws also introduced a new advertising campaign, featuring Canadian actor William Shatner of Star Trek fame who told viewers, "More than the price is right at Loblaws ... but by gosh the price is right."

Weston also brought in new managerial talent that included former university schoolmate Dave Nichol and fellow McKinsey consultant Richard Currie, who took on the role of "change agents". In spite of no previous experience in the retail food industry, Weston gave Nichol and Currie the authority to force change on an often reluctant senior management. Nichol was made President of Loblaws in Ontario and later Loblaw International Merchants. He became closely associated with the company's first in-house brand No Name in 1978 and was behind the introduction of the President's Choice brand in 1983. Currie's knowledge of logistics led to him being appointed President of Loblaw Companies Limited and, years later, George Weston Limited.

With the company's holdings in the United States also losing money, particularly Chicago, Illinois-based National Tea with some 700 supermarkets, Weston initiated a similar program of rationalization and renewal. He and Currie rented a townhouse in a Chicago suburb and spent months devising a plan that saw hundreds of outlets closed. Those stores that remained were renovated and rebranded in the hope of preserving the company's stake in the U.S. market. Weston noted, "it was in the cards that National Tea should be, or would be, disposed of. But I felt we had a tremendous foothold in the U.S. and it must not be lost, almost at any price."

=== Private labels ===
In addition to investing in store renovations, early on Weston earmarked $40 million for the development of private label brands:

"We found it essential to change products and services before redesigning their image. For example, nothing is more disappointing for a consumer than to buy a private label product because of the attractiveness of its redesigned label and then find that the same quality that had disappointed her previously had not been improved."

In March 1978, Loblaw launched "No Name", a line of 16 generic products in simple black and yellow packaging with advertised savings of 10 to 40 percent over the national brands. Within weeks, some No Name items had sold out. Months later, the company opened its first No Frills store, featuring No Name, along with a limited selection of 500 items at discount prices. Consumer response was so favourable that it began converting older, more marginal stores to No Frills outlets.

As the product line-up expanded, Loblaw soon began experimenting with a variety of gourmet No Name items. When sales of "President's Blend Gourmet Coffee" started outselling every other grocery item on the shelf, the decision was made to introduce a premium line of store brand products. In 1983, "President's Choice" was launched, with each item endorsed by Loblaws President Dave Nichol and promoted through the popular advertising supplement Dave Nichol's Insider's Report. No Name and President's Choice went on to account for almost a third of grocery item sales at Loblaw.

=== Chairmanship ===
In March 1975, Weston was appointed Chairman and Managing Director of George Weston Limited. As Weston took charge of North American operations, his brother Garry Weston, based in London, England, continued to head Associated British Foods. Although market share in Ontario was regained, the company continued to struggle. In 1976, year-end results showed a loss of $50 million for Loblaw, while parent George Weston Limited lost $14 million – the first recorded loss in the company's history. That same year, Loblaw sold three unprofitable divisions - Chicago, Syracuse, and California State – representing 280 stores or half of its remaining U.S. retail outlets.

Within the first few years of Weston's chairmanship, $300 million of non-core assets were divested. "The one philosophical change as a result of my involvement with the company was to swing from a commitment to sales growth – almost regardless of geography of industry, sales came first, earnings second – to the question of return on capital employed and productivity in its most sophisticated sense."

Well into the 1970s, the company continued to sell assets to shore up its balance sheet. In 1978, both Loblaw and George Weston Limited returned to profitability and in 1979 the company showed record earnings of $76 million on sales of $6 billion.

=== Expansion ===
On the retail side, Loblaw expanded through the 1980s when it had become Canada's largest and most profitable grocery retailer. Loblaw had begun opening large format, one-stop-shopping centres in Western Canada under the Real Canadian Superstore banner and were successful, but when similar large-scale 'hypermarkets' were opened in Ontario, they lost money and had to be scaled back. As a result of Loblaw owning much of its real estate, rather than leasing, the company was able to reduce the size of its Supercentres by simply renting out the redundant space.

While retail formats were not easily transferable, the company's 'control label' products proved successful from one store format and part of the country to another. By the 1990s, No Name and President's Choice products accounted for $1.5 billion in revenue with sales that extended into the United States.

=== Free trade ===
While Weston expressed personal support for free trade with the United States, the signing of an agreement in 1988 resulted in another re-evaluation of his company's asset mix. Through the late 1980s and 1990s, businesses that included biscuit and ice cream making, bathroom tissue manufacturing, milling, sugar refining and chocolate bar makings, were divested as domestic industries struggled to remain competitive:

"The historic east-west dynamics of the Canadian economy, as well as our small and scattered population, created structural inefficiencies in everything we did. And so, in response to free trade, we had to become competitive on our manufacturing side, which meant staying with fewer product categories and only those that could succeed on the North American scale. We restructured, we consolidated, and we did what had to be done for our long-term survival."

=== Divestiture and growth ===
In 1995, Loblaw divested the last of its retail holding in the United States while Weston oversaw the expansion of Canadian retail operations. Loblaw bought 80-store Agora Foods of Atlantic Canada for $81 million in late 1998 and soon thereafter announced the purchase of Quebec-based Provigo for $1.7 billion. Meanwhile, George Weston Limited continued to move away from resource-based industries. In 1998 the company E.B. Eddy Forest Products was divested for $800 million. East and West coast fish processing operations, namely British Columbia Packers and Connors Brothers of New Brunswick, were merged and sold.

Weston greatly expanded the company's American bakery operations with the purchase of Bestfoods Baking Co. from Unilever for (U.S.) $1.7 billion in 2001. With nineteen plants, Weston acquired brands that included Entenmann's and Thomas' English Muffins.

=== Retrenchment ===
In 2006, Loblaw recorded its first loss in almost two decades as a program to centralize administrative functions and consolidate warehouse operations resulted in chronic supply chains problems and customer complaints of empty shelves. In September, Loblaw President John Lederer and Chairman Weston resigned. Galen G. Weston, Weston's son, became the new Executive Chairman with Allen Leighton appointed Deputy Chairman and later President. Weston retained the post of Chairman and President of parent George Weston Limited. With the introduction of a "fix the basics" program, designed to re-focus on food retailing, and a drive to resolve logistical problems, Loblaw returned to profitability in 2007.

In 2008, several major assets were sold, namely Neilson Dairy to Saputo for (CAN) $465 million and George Weston Bakeries and Stroehmann Bakeries in the United States to Mexican conglomerate Grupo Bimbo for (US) $2.5 billion. Weston noted the sale of the American assets represented the company's biggest deal ever and that these transactions left Weston and Loblaw with a combined $5 billion in cash to use for future acquisitions. In 2009, Loblaw acquired T & T Supermarket, a chain of Chinese grocery stores with operations in British Columbia, Alberta and Ontario.

== Holt Renfrew ==
Although a bid by Weston and George Weston Limited to acquire the Hudson's Bay Company and its chain of department stores failed in 1979, a second opportunity to acquire a major Canadian retailer presented itself several years later. In 1986, Wittington Investments, the Weston family holding company, announced the purchase of Holt Renfrew & Co. Limited. Press reports named a purchase price of $43 million for the fifteen store chain. Holt Renfrew subsequently underwent an extensive renovation program.

== Windsor development in Florida ==
In 1989, Weston and his wife broke ground on the Windsor gated community in Vero Beach, Florida, a private residential development on Florida's east coast. Promoted as a "Village by the Sea", the project combined Weston's interest in modern architecture with decades of first-hand experience in commercial planning. The development sits on 425 acres (1.72 km^{2}) with 350 residences of Anglo-Caribbean design. It has a full-service equestrian center and an 18-hole golf course.

== Selfridges ==
In 2003, it was announced that Weston had completed a deal to buy Selfridges, the British department store chain, through the Weston family holding company. Press reports quoted a purchase price of £598 million. Plans to expand the number of stores were shelved in favour of extensive renovations to Selfridges' flagship store, the historic Oxford Street landmark in the heart of London's shopping district.

His daughter Alannah Weston (married to the grandson and heir of the late Sir Desmond Cochrane, 3rd Baronet, and his Lebanese wife Lady Cochrane Sursock) was subsequently named creative director at Selfridges. The Selfridges Group has since expanded its holdings with the November 2010 acquisition of luxury department store chain De Bijenkorf of the Netherlands and the July 2011 purchase of the Ogilvy department store in downtown Montreal.

== Personal life ==
Weston married Hilary Frayne on July 23, 1966. They had two children, Alannah and Galen Weston Jr., both born in 1972.

When in the United Kingdom, the Westons would reside at Fort Belvedere outside London, while in Canada they resided in central Toronto or on a private island in Georgian Bay, Ontario. They spent their winters either at a gated community in Eleuthera and Harbour Island in the Bahamas or at the Windsor gated community in Vero Beach, Florida.

In August 1983, Weston was the target of an attempted kidnapping by the Provisional Irish Republican Army from his estate in Ireland. The police had been tipped off about the attempt and set up an ambush for the kidnappers. Upon the kidnappers' arrival, a gun fight broke out; two of the kidnappers were killed, and five were arrested.

== Later life and death ==
Weston retired in 2016 as chairman of George Weston Limited and was succeeded by his son. He died at his home in Toronto on April 12, 2021, after a long illness.

== Philanthropy ==
Weston was a supporter of a range of charitable causes, both personally and as Chairman of the W. Garfield Weston Foundation. The Foundation assists Canadian students through the Garfield Weston Awards, along with various scholarship programs, and made possible the Weston Family Learning Centre at the Art Gallery of Ontario and the Weston Family Innovation Centre at the Ontario Science Centre. The Foundation is a major contributor to the Nature Conservancy of Canada and its work to preserve wilderness lands. It also funds scientific research, especially into Canada's ecologically fragile Arctic. It further provides financial support to a variety of social organizations that include food banks and the Salvation Army in Canada. He also served as president of the board of the Royal Agricultural Winter Fair and as chairman and chief fundraiser for the Lester B. Pearson United World College of the Pacific. In 2004, Weston and the Hon. Hilary M. Weston (26th Lieutenant Governor of Ontario 1997–2002) and Chair of the Renaissance ROM Campaign, donated $10 million to the initiative to revitalize the Royal Ontario Museum – a contribution matched by the W. Garfield Weston Foundation. In 2020, amidst the COVID-19 pandemic, The Garfield Weston Foundation created an initiative valued at £25 million designed to support mid to large-scale organizations impacted by the virus.

In recognition of his charitable donations, Weston was appointed an Officer of the Order of Canada in 1990, awarded the Order of Ontario in 2005, and made a Commander of the Royal Victorian Order in 2017.

Weston was also a significant contributor to the Fraser Institute, a conservative think-tank headquartered in Vancouver, British Columbia, donating over $1 million CDN annually.

== See also ==
- List of billionaires
- Fort Belvedere, Surrey – the Westons' residence in Britain

== Sources ==
- Bradburn, Jamie (June 19, 2019). "Loblaw Companies Limited". The Canadian Encyclopedia. Historica Canada.
- "George Weston Ltd". Encyclopedia.com.
- Kearney, Mark & Ray, Randy (2002). I Know That Name!: The People Behind Canada's Best Known Brand Names from Elizabeth Arden to Walter Zeller. Toronto: Dundurn Press. ISBN 1-55002-407-8.
- "Reinventing Loblaws" (PDF). weston.ca. Archived (PDF) from the original on April 14, 2021.
- Yusufali, Sasha & Clements, Derrick (March 26, 2019). "George Weston Limited". The Canadian Encyclopedia. Historica Canada.
