= Gord Smith (sculptor) =

Canadian sculptor (1937–2023)

Gord Smith RCA
- Born: Gordon Hammond Smith; October 8, 1937; Montreal, Quebec, Canada
- Died: November 4, 2023 (aged 86)
- Education: Sir George Williams University
- Known for: Sculptor
- Notable work: Canada Screen (1967); Icarus (1980); Sails (1982); Triptych (1983)

Gordon Hammond Smith RCA (October 8, 1937 – November 4, 2023) was a Canadian artist who sculpted geometric forms in metal and wood. He was considered one of Canada's leading sculptors of the postwar period and his work is marked by a great diversity of styles inspired by music, nature, and other themes. Trained in architecture and engineering, he produced work in metal that reflects a mastery of technique and conveys great flexibility.

== Biography ==
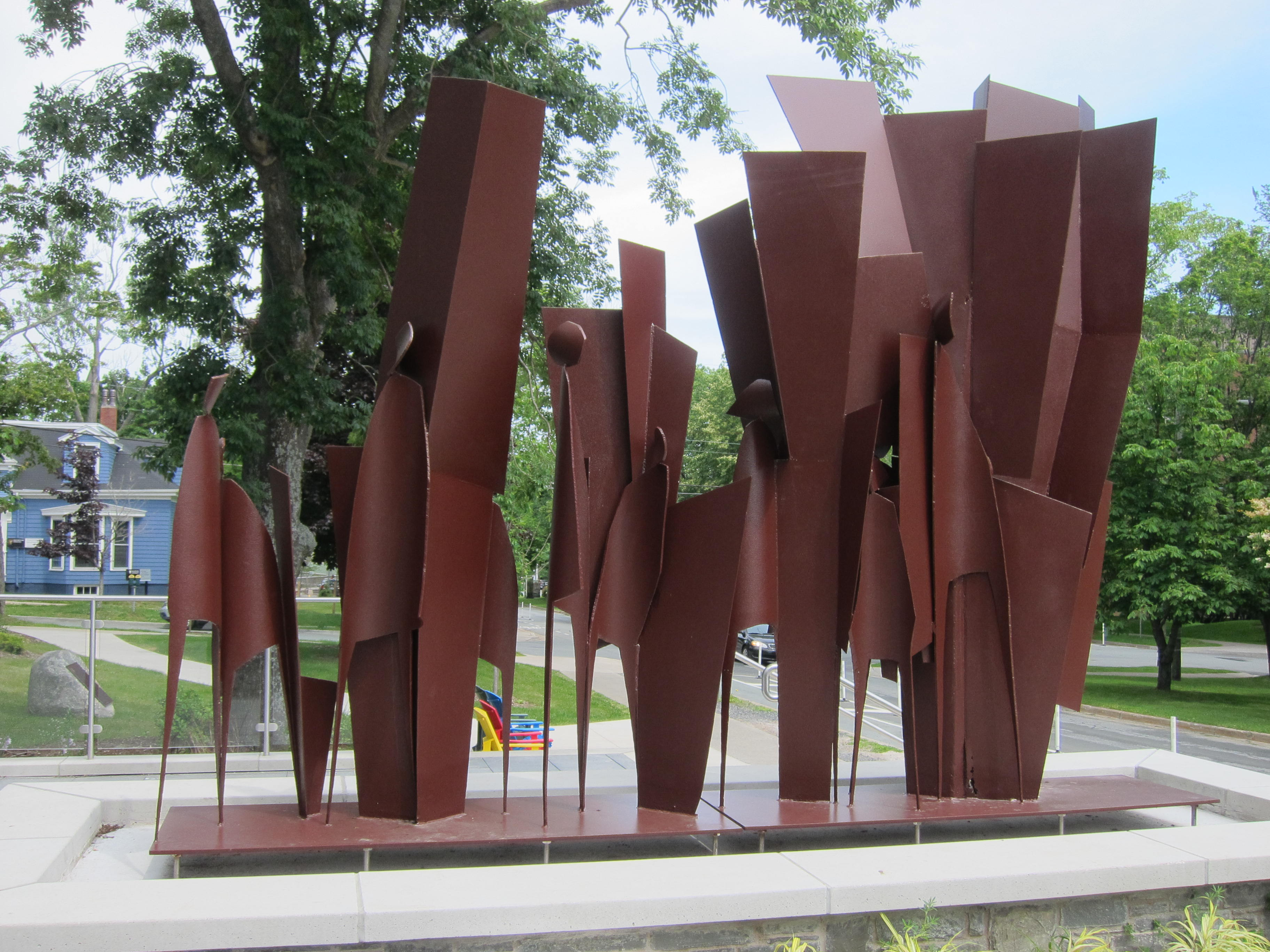
Jury, 1968 by Gord Smith, Weldon Law Building, Dalhousie University

Smith studied architecture at Sir George Williams University from 1956 to 1959. He went on to work with the architectural firm of Lawson Betts and Cash in Montreal from 1956 to 1958. He had originally learned to weld with a torch his older brother used to rebuild old cars. Smith received his first commission from the Fraser-Hickson Library in Montreal at the age of 21. The copper sculpture was erected in 1959 at the north entrance to the library.

Smith, alongside his postwar contemporaries Yves Trudeau, Armand Vaillancourt, and Gerald Gladstone, was testing the possibilities of welded-steel construction in the 1960s.

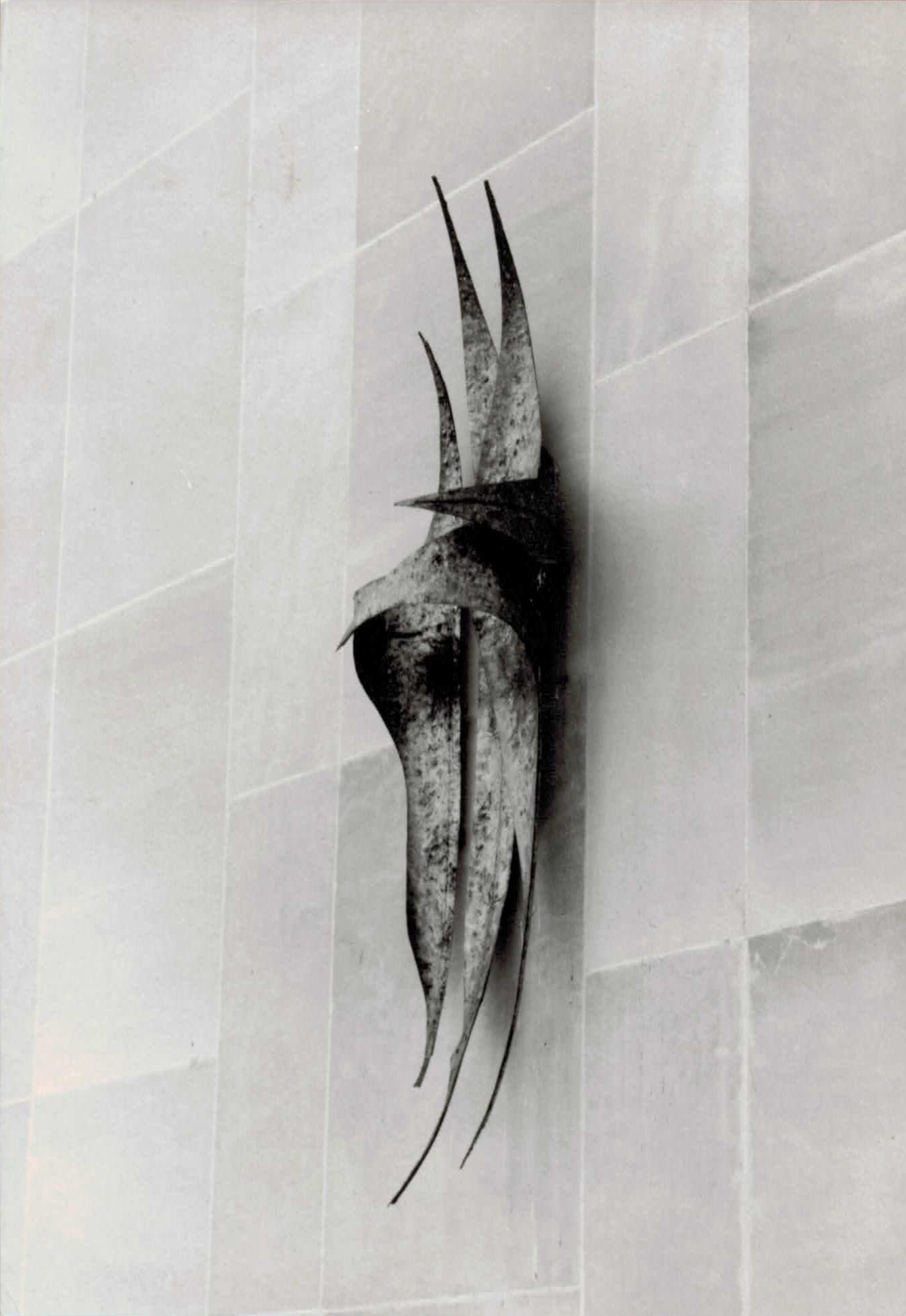
Family by Gord Smith, 1959

In 1967, Smith was elected to the Royal Canadian Academy of Arts. That same year, he was commissioned to create Canada Screen for the Canadian pavilion at Expo 67. The screen was made of cor-ten steel, measured 110' x 12' and weighed approximately 13 tons. The Musée d'art contemporain de Montréal has the study done for Canada Screen in their permanent collection. It is currently installed in front of the Hôpital Maisonneuve-Rosemont in Montreal. Bursting with diverse elements, it is representative of the artist's desire to set movement within works that convey the transience and the intensity of life. The combination of rays and vertical beams from the study were incorporated into the Expo 67 Canada Screen.

From the 1980s on, Smith created more than thirty public artworks commissioned by important institutions in Canada and the United States. In 1980, Bell Canada commissioned him to create a large-scale bronze sculpture. This sculpture, entitled Icarus, is permanently installed near Albert Campbell Square at the Scarborough Civic Centre. Another monumental piece, Sails, was made of stainless steel and commissioned by George Weston Limited. The abstract piece sits between two flights of steps at the front of Weston Centre (Toronto) and consists of three welded steel panels angled like the sails of a boat experiencing strong winds. The inscription on the sculpture reads "'Tis the set of her sails and not the gales that determines the way she goes".

In 1983, Smith created a trio of bronze pillars entitled Triptych for the A.E. LePage company (now Royal LePage). These three towering jagged-bronze figures now stand just west of the Art Gallery of Windsor in their outdoor sculpture park. The trio have a pegged market value of just over $440,000. A critic from the Ottawa Citizen wrote in 1977 that "it isn't that the figures are androgynous, but that they evoke images of strength, both male and female. Whoever is fighting to get free of the bronze column is one hell of a fighter."

Sails, 1982 by Gord Smith in front of the Weston Centre in Toronto.

Smith was assistant professor in the Department of Visual Arts of the University of Victoria from 1972 to 1975. In 1993–1994, he assumed a teaching role as visiting professor in the Department of Art and History, McMaster University, Hamilton.

Smith died on November 4, 2023, at the age of 86.

== Collections ==
Smith's work is included in the permanent collections of:

- Confederation Centre Art Gallery
- National Gallery of Canada
- McGill University
- McMaster University
- Daytona Beach Community College (now the Southeast Museum of Photography)
- Agnes Etherington Art Centre
- Montreal Museum of Contemporary Art
- Dalhousie University
- Carleton University
- Art Gallery of Windsor

== Honours ==
- 1967 - Member of the Royal Canadian Academy of Arts
