= Alannah Weston =

Irish-Canadian businesswoman (born 1972)

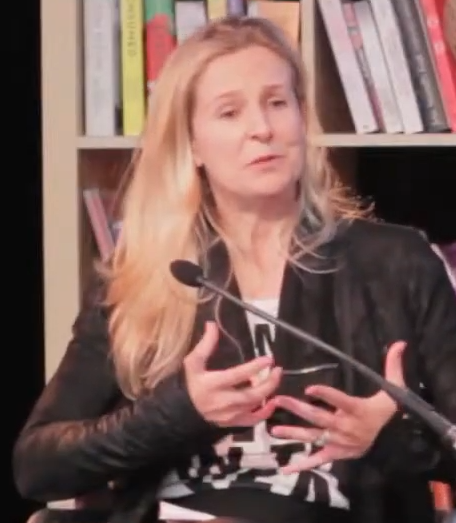
- Weston in 2014
- Born: Alannah Elizabeth Weston; January 8, 1972 (age 54); Dublin, Ireland
- Citizenship: Irish; Canadian
- Education: Merton College, Oxford
- Occupation: Businesswoman
- Spouse: Alex Cochrane
- Parents: Galen Weston (father); Hilary Weston (mother)
- Relatives: Galen Weston Jr. (brother); W. Garfield Weston (grandfather); George Weston (great-grandfather)

Alannah Elizabeth Weston (born January 8, 1972) is an Irish-Canadian businesswoman who is the former chairman of the Selfridges Group. She is a member of the Weston family and serves as a director of the family's holding company, Wittington Investments.

== Background ==
Weston was born in Dublin, Ireland, on January 8, 1972. She is the elder child of Galen Weston and his wife, Hilary. She has one sibling, younger brother Galen Weston Jr. She is a citizen of both Ireland and Canada.

She is married to Alex Cochrane (an architect and the elder son of Sir Marc Cochrane, 4th Baronet), with whom she has two children. Weston lives with her family in London.

== Career ==
Weston attended Havergal College in Toronto and studied English literature at Merton College, Oxford. After graduation, she worked as a journalist at The Daily Telegraph, Tatler, and British Vogue. She left journalism in 1999 to work for Rose Marie Bravo at luxury fashion brand Burberry, where she was head of press. In 2001, Weston left Burberry to establish her own design agency, Zephyr Projects.

In 2004, Weston became creative director of Selfridges department store in London. She was appointed deputy chair of the Selfridges Group in 2014 and joined the board of directors of George Weston Limited in 2016. She became the chair of the Selfridges Group in 2019. As a member of the Weston family, she was ranked tenth on the 2021 Sunday Times Rich List. Weston's family is estimated to have personal wealth of approximately €11 billion.

In August 2022, Weston stepped down as chairman of Selfridges Group upon the sale of the business to Thai conglomerate Central Group and Austria's Signa Holding.

== Philanthropy ==
From 2012 to 2017, Weston was a director of the Blue Marine Foundation, a British marine conservation charity. She led the Selfridges Group Foundation and is a trustee of the Garfield Weston Foundation. She is a trustee of the Galen and Hilary Weston Foundation (previously the Selfridges Group Foundation), and she is also a trustee of the Reta Lila Howard Foundation, which is named after her paternal grandmother. She is a director of the Hilary and Galen Weston Foundation alongside her brother.
