= Canadian Club Toronto =

Canadian non-profit speakers' forum

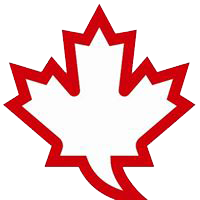
Logo of Canadian Club Toronto

Canadian Club Toronto, formerly known as The Canadian Club of Toronto, is a non-profit speakers' forum in Toronto, Ontario. It meets several times a month to hear speeches given by invited guests from diverse fields, including politics, law, business, science, media and the arts.

== History ==
The Canadian Club of Toronto was founded in 1897 to encourage interest in Canadian public affairs. It subsequently developed a role as an opinion-formation vehicle for some of Toronto's most prominent citizens.

Speeches were initially given in the evening, but starting in 1902, the club moved to its present lunchtime format. In 1903, several members of the Canadian Club, concerned that the club was not sufficiently opposed to the wave of anti-British sentiment being expressed in the wake of the Alaskan Boundary Tribunal decision, left the Canadian Club to found the more pro-British Empire Club of Canada.

In the days before radio and television, the club provided a chance for influential Torontonians to have contact with Canadian and international leaders in a variety of fields. Today, the club hosts events in a number of different formats, but most events use the traditional luncheon style.

Speakers that addressed the club since 2000 have included Paul Martin, Stephen Harper, Vladimir Putin, Justin Trudeau, Paul Bremer, Bob Rae, Michael Dell, Jean Charest, John de Chastelain, Hillary Clinton, Gloria Macapagal Arroyo, Margaret Atwood, Karen Kain, The Right Honourable David Johnston, David Frum, Pamela Wallin, David Suzuki, Beverley McLachlin, Dalton McGuinty, Belinda Stronach, David Dodge, Pinball Clemons, Galen Weston Jr., Louise Arbour, Adrienne Clarkson, Donovan Bailey, Mark Carney and Jack Layton.
