= Galen Weston Jr. =

Irish-Canadian businessman (born 1972)

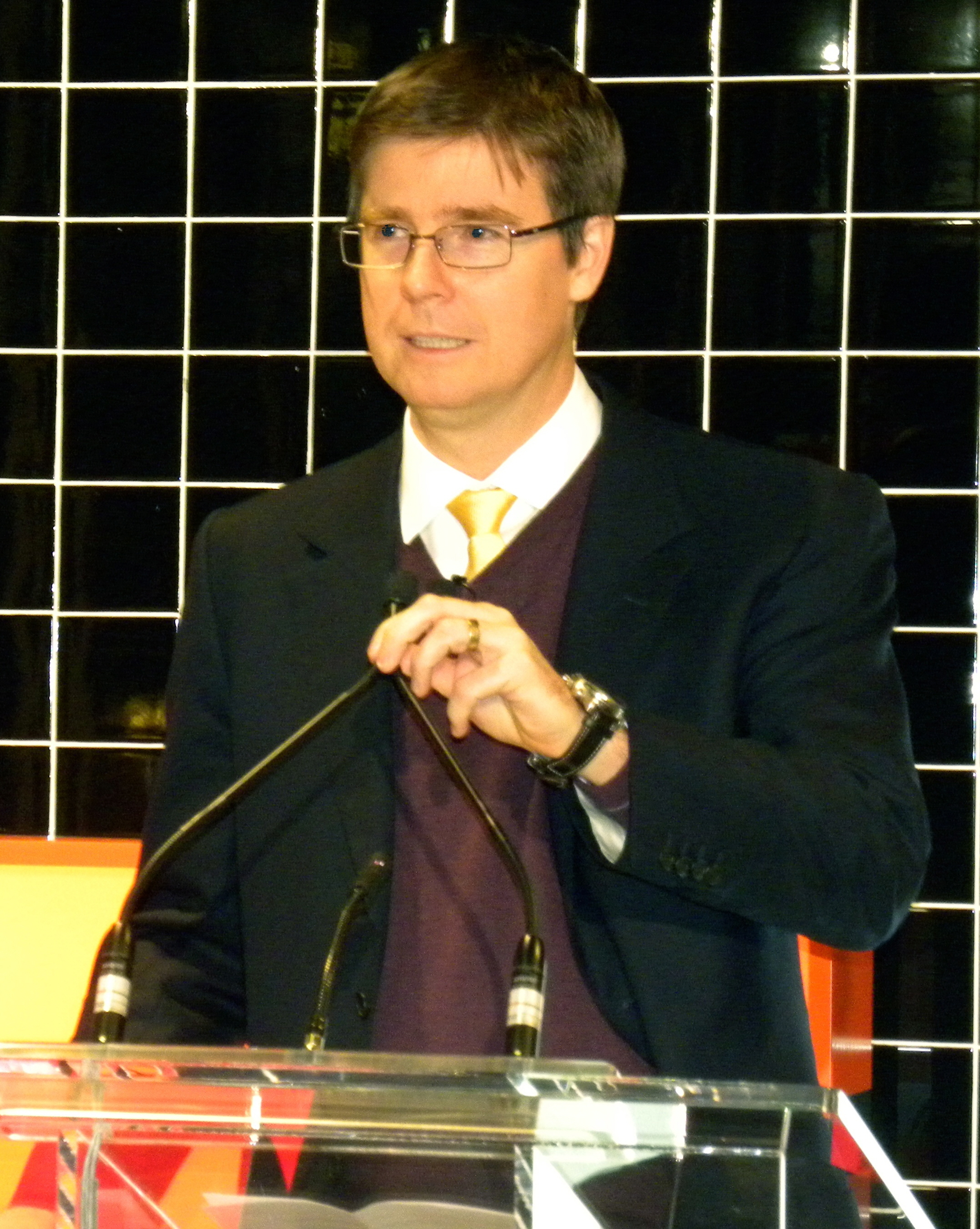
- Weston in 2011
- Born: Willard Galen Garfield Weston; December 19, 1972 (age 53); Dublin, Leinster, Ireland
- Education: Harvard University; Columbia University (MBA)
- Occupation: Businessman
- Spouse: Alexandra Schmidt
- Parents: Galen Weston (father); Hilary Weston (mother)
- Relatives: Alannah Weston (sister); W. Garfield Weston (grandfather); George Weston (great-grandfather)

Willard Galen Garfield Weston (born December 19, 1972), known as Galen Weston Jr. or Galen G. Weston, is an Irish-Canadian businessman and a member of the Weston family. He is chairman and chief executive officer (CEO) of George Weston Limited, and chairman and former president of Loblaw Companies Limited. He is the second child of Galen Weston and Hilary Weston.

== Early life and education ==
Weston was born on December 19, 1972, in Dublin, Ireland, where his father Galen Weston had relocated in the 1960s. Weston's father originally moved to Dublin to start up a supermarket chain. He married Hilary Frayne there in 1966 and had two children, Alannah and Galen. The Westons relocated to Canada in 1974.

Weston grew up in Toronto, Ontario, where he attended Upper Canada College. He subsequently received his bachelor's from Harvard University and his Master of Business Administration degree from Columbia University.

== Career ==
Weston succeeded his father to become the executive chairman of Loblaw Companies Limited in October 2006. Previously, he had held positions in the company for eight years and was a member of its board of directors. At that point, the company was worth around $9.5 billion. Since becoming chairman of Loblaw, Weston has featured in a number of television and radio commercials for Loblaw and its brands, similar to Dave Nichol who had been the spokesman for Loblaw in the 1980s.

In September 2016, Weston took over from his father as CEO of George Weston Limited. In December 2020, Weston succeeded his father as the controlling shareholder of Wittington Investments, Limited, which controls George Weston Limited. In March 2021, it was announced that Weston would assume the leadership role at Loblaw Companies Limited following the retirement of Sarah Davis as its president that year, changing his title from executive chairman to chairman and president.

On December 19, 2017, Loblaw and its parent company George Weston Limited announced action the companies had taken to address their role in a price-fixing arrangement involving certain packaged bread products. In the statement, Weston is quoted as saying "this sort of behaviour is wrong and has no place in our business or Canada's grocery industry," and that "this should never have happened." In response, Loblaw and George Weston said the companies had reported the price fixing to the Competition Bureau, that the employees responsible for George Weston and Loblaw's role in this are no longer with the companies and the companies had significantly enhanced their compliance programs with measures that are industry-leading and go further than the Competition Bureau's requirements. Loblaw also announced it was offering customers a $25 Loblaw Card, which could be used to purchase items sold in Loblaw grocery stores across Canada. Registration for the card opened on January 8, 2018. As of April 2019, many people have still not received the restitution. Loblaws and George Weston Limited agreed to pay $500 million to settle the lawsuit in July 2024, with the class action lawsuit against several other retailers continuing.

In June 2020, Weston confirmed the cancellation of an hourly CA$2.00 wage premium to Loblaw workers, which received criticism from then Unifor President Jerry Dias. The premium was paid to low-wage grocery store workers, who were deemed "essential" and required to attend work while much of Canada was shut down in response to the COVID-19 pandemic. The cancellation of the pandemic wage premium drew further criticism, as Weston's pay package from Loblaws in 2022 was worth $8.4 million (after receiving a $3 million pay rise from 2021) and including his remuneration as head of George Weston Ltd. his total compensation reached $11.7 million. Weston, who had been the company spokesman of Loblaw advertising campaigns in addition to his executive role as Loblaw president, has since 2022 became the "very face of grocery store gouging" after he aggressively defended Loblaws' record profits and stated that Loblaws was not responsible for increased grocery prices during the 2021–2023 inflation surge.

On April 18, 2023, it was announced that Weston would step down as president of Loblaw, to be succeeded by Danish retail veteran Per Bank in 2024.

== Personal life ==
In 2005, Weston married Alexandra Schmidt, granddaughter of businessman Thomas J. Bata and his wife, Sonja.
