= Hilary Weston =

Irish–Canadian businesswoman (1942–2025)

The Honourable Hilary Weston CM CVO OOnt
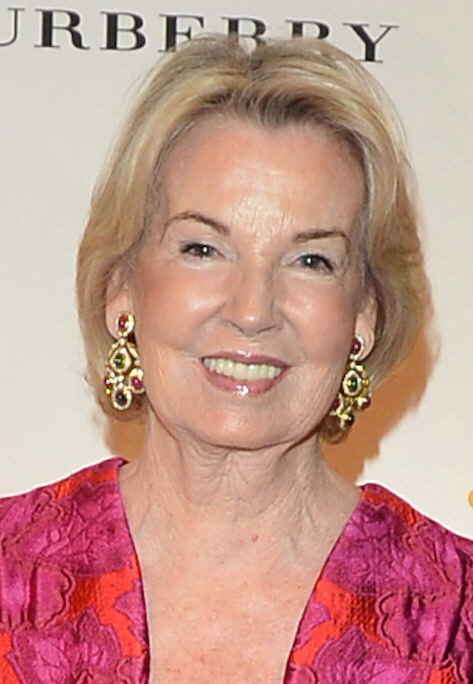
- Weston in 2013

26th Lieutenant-Governor of Ontario
- In office January 24, 1997 – March 7, 2002
- Monarch: Elizabeth II
- Governors General: Roméo LeBlanc; Adrienne Clarkson
- Premier: Mike Harris
- Preceded by: Hal Jackman
- Succeeded by: James Bartleman

Personal details
- Born: Hilary Mary Frayne; January 12, 1942 Dún Laoghaire, County Dublin, Ireland
- Died: August 2, 2025 (aged 83) London, England
- Spouse: Galen Weston (m. 1966; died 2021)
- Children: Alannah; Galen Jr.
- Occupation: Fashion mogul; writer

Hilary Mary Weston (née Frayne; January 12, 1942 – August 2, 2025) was an Irish–Canadian business mogul and writer who served as the 26th lieutenant-governor of Ontario from 1997 to 2002. During her five-year tenure, Weston focused on issues related to women, volunteerism and young people, drawing public attention to people working with the homeless, in hospices and as mentors to at-risk youth.

== Biography ==
=== Early life ===
Hilary Mary Frayne was born on January 12, 1942, in Dún Laoghaire, County Dublin, Ireland. Her parents William and Noel Frayne raised her and her four siblings in Dublin. She was educated at Loreto Abbey, Dalkey. Her father died when she was 17, so she helped support her family by working as a fashion model before marrying Galen Weston in 1966. They moved to Toronto in 1971, and she became a Canadian citizen. They had two children, Alannah and Galen Jr., and four grandchildren – two girls with Alannah and her husband Alex Cochrane (an interior architect), and two boys with Galen and his wife Alexandra.

=== Business career ===
Weston spent over two decades working in business and the fashion industry. As deputy chair of Holt Renfrew, she promoted Canadian design and merchandise. During the same period, she also served as a director of Brown Thomas & Co. in Ireland.

=== Lieutenant-governor of Ontario ===
Prime minister Jean Chretien appointed Weston as lieutenant-governor of Ontario on December 12, 1996. She was the second female to serve as Ontario's vice-regal, after Pauline Mills McGibbon was the first in 1974. During her investiture ceremony, on January 24, 1997, she announced she would donate her $92,000 yearly salary to charity. Her focus, as the province's 26th vice-regal, was to help young people, improve the status of women and extol the virtues of volunteer work.

=== Charity work ===
In 1979, Weston founded the Ireland Fund of Canada, a non-partisan, non-denominational organization that funds community projects in Ireland to promote peace. She continued to serve as an honorary patron of the organization for the rest of her life.

An interest in early childhood education led Weston to serve as founding chair of the Mabin School in Toronto. She also co-founded and chaired the Canadian Environment Educational Foundation, and she established the Winter Garden Show at the Royal Agricultural Winter Fair.

Weston explored her longstanding interest in homes and gardens as co-author of two best-selling books, In a Canadian Garden (1989) and At Home in Canada (1995).

After her term as Lieutenant Governor, Weston spearheaded the most successful fundraising campaign in Canadian cultural history, which raised more than $250 million for the Royal Ontario Museum. She was patron of several organizations dealing with social issues, such as the Abbeyfield House Society, the Hospice Association of Ontario, the Yonge Street Mission, the Landmine Survivors Network (later known as Survivor Corps), the Ontario March of Dimes and the Prince's Trust Canada. Weston also devoted a significant proportion of her time, as well as her business and fashion expertise, to Selfridges, the London department store of which she was a director.

The Hilary and Galen Weston Foundation was founded by Weston and her spouse Galen Weston in 2020.

=== Later life and death ===
Weston spent her later years in London, where she died on August 2, 2025. The Government of Ontario held a provincial memorial service on October 17, 2025 at St. Paul's, Bloor Street.

== Honours ==
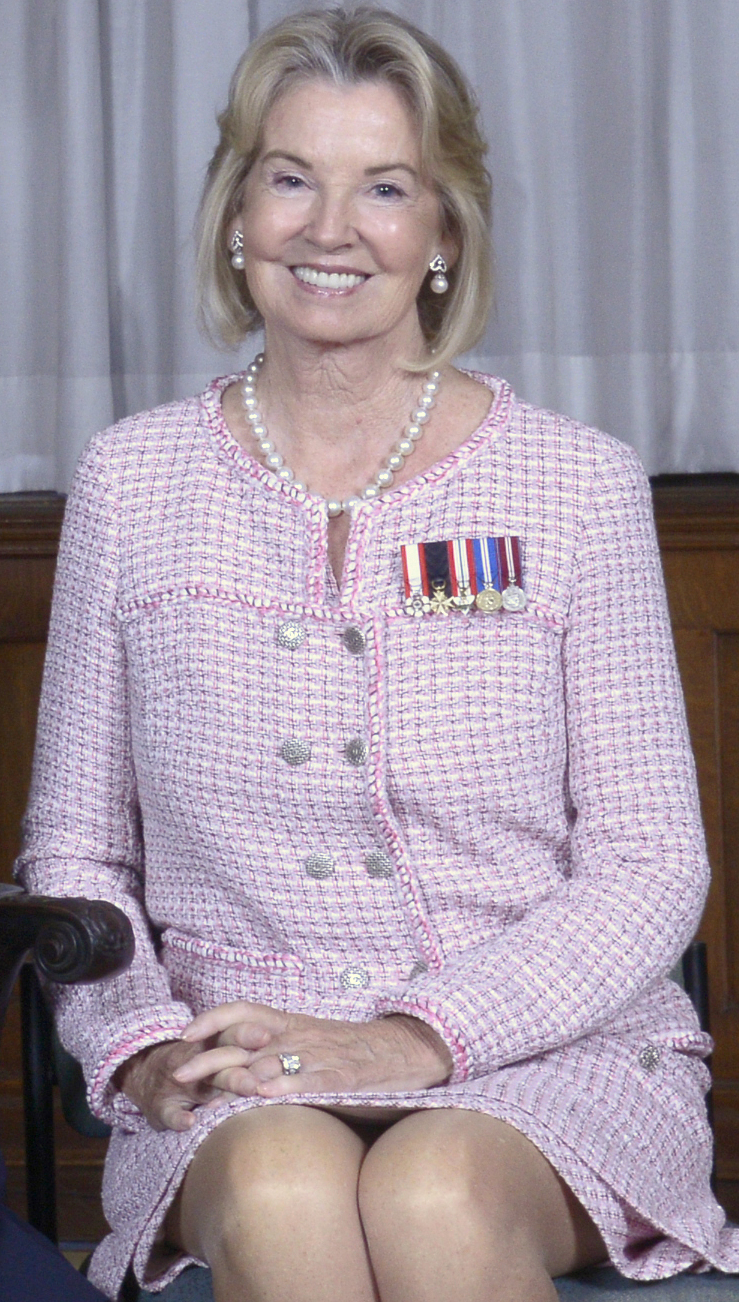
Weston in 2014, wearing her then-current miniature medals

As Lieutenant Governor of Ontario, Weston automatically received the Order of Ontario (OOnt) in 1997, and she served as ex officio Chancellor of the Order during her term in office. She was also automatically invested as a Dame of Justice of the Venerable Order of St. John (DStJ) in 1997.

Weston was appointed as a Member of the Order of Canada in 2003. She received the Canadian version of the Queen Elizabeth II Golden Jubilee Medal in 2002, and automatically received the Canadian version of the Queen Elizabeth II Diamond Jubilee Medal in 2012.

In the 2015 Queen's Birthday Honours, she was made a Commander of the Royal Victorian Order, in recognition of donations by the Galen Weston Foundation made to the College of St. George at Windsor Castle.

Ten post-secondary institutions recognized Weston with honorary degrees, including the University of Western Ontario, Concordia University, University of St. Michael's College, University of Toronto, Massey College, Trinity College, Dublin and University College Dublin.

In 2009, Weston received the President's Award at the YWCA Toronto Women of Distinction Awards, for modelling leadership in public and private life.

=== Ribbon bars ===

Ribbon	Description	Year	Notes
	Order of Canada (CM)	2003	Member
	Royal Victorian Order (CVO)	2015	Commander
	Order of St. John (DStJ)	1997	Dame of Justice
	Order of Ontario (OOnt)	1997	Member
	Queen Elizabeth II Golden Jubilee Medal	2002	Canadian version
	Queen Elizabeth II Diamond Jubilee Medal	2012	Canadian version
	King Charles III Coronation Medal	2025	Canadian version

== Arms ==
Coat of arms of Hilary Weston
Notes The arms of Hilary Weston consist of: Crest Upon a helmet mantled Azure doubled Or within a wreath of these colours issuant from a coronet erablé Argent the rim bearing a frieze of trefoils Vert a demi lioness Gules the sinister paw resting on a wheat sheaf Or the dexter paw holding a closed book bound Or edged Gules. Escutcheon Or a fess Azure semé of Ermine spots Or between in chief two bees volant and in base a panpipe Azure. Supporters Two mares Or the dexter gorged with a wreath of roses Gules the sinister gorged with a collar of ash leaves Vert. Compartment A grassy mound Vert. Motto Suaviter in Modo Fortiter in Re

Government offices
Preceded by Hal Jackman	Lieutenant Governor of Ontario; 1997–2002	Succeeded by James Bartleman
