= Weston Centre (Toronto) =

- Wittington Tower
- Interactive map of the Weston Centre area

General information
- Type: Commercial offices
- Location: 22 St. Clair Avenue East, Toronto, Ontario, Canada
- Coordinates: 43.688602°N 79.393151°W
- Completed: 1976
- Owner: George Weston Limited

Height
- Antenna spire: None
- Top floor: 20

Design and construction
- Architect: Leslie Rebanks
- Main contractor: EGM Cape and Co.

The Weston Centre is an office building complex in Toronto, Ontario, Canada. It is located near the corner of Yonge Street and St. Clair Avenue, within walking distance of the St. Clair (TTC) subway station. It is home to the head office of George Weston Limited and subsidiary Choice Properties REIT.

== Wittington Tower ==
Designed by architect Leslie Rebanks, the Wittington Tower is a 20-storey octagonal structure located at 22 St. Clair Avenue East. Completed in 1975, its design won several awards. The tower is part of the Weston Centre complex, housing the corporate offices of George Weston Limited, which controls Loblaw Companies Limited. Wittington Investments Limited, the Weston family's holding company, also has its offices within the building.

=== Structure ===
'Sails,' by sculptor Gord Smith, R.C.A has sat at the base of the building since 1982.

Built by general contractors EGM Cape and Co., the horizontal members, called spandrels and separated by windows of tinted glass, are made of stainless steel, while the vertical members, mullions, are of aluminum. Because of the different light-reflecting qualities of the two materials, this creates an interesting dichromatic contrast under different daytime lighting conditions.

Reflecting the overall shape of the building, the lobby features a metal ceiling with eight-sided truncated metal 'stalactites.' This is accompanied by a floor-to-ceiling metallic sculpted mural. The reception (security) desk is a solid 5-ton slab of granite. "The entrance has a dramatic octagonal stalactic ceiling, growing naturally out of the building module. This, together with the artwork and the lobby furniture, were all designed by the architect."

Rebanks received a special award from the American Institute of Business Designers for the building's ground-floor lobby design, in addition to the Institute's grand prize for the 19th and 20th floor reception and corporate offices.

On May 7, 1982, a stainless steel sculpture called 'Sails,' by sculptor Gord Smith (sculptor), R.C.A. was erected below the tower.
