= George Weston Limited =

Canadian food processing and distribution company

- Type: Public
- Traded as: Common: TSX: WN; Preferred: TSX: WN.PR.A; TSX: WN.PR.B; TSX: WN.PR.C; TSX: WN.PR.D; TSX: WN.PR.E; Indices: S&P/TSX 60 component
- Industry: Food processing Food distribution
- Founded: 1882; 144 years ago, in Toronto, Ontario, Canada
- Founder: George Weston
- Headquarters: 22 St. Clair Avenue East, Toronto, Ontario, Canada
- Area served: Canada; United States
- Key people: Galen Weston Jr. (chairman and CEO)
- Revenue: $54.705 billion CAD (2020)
- Operating income: $2.888 billion CAD (2020)
- Net income: $486 million CAN (2012)
- Owner: Wittington Investments (63%)
- Number of employees: 140,800 (2012)
- Subsidiaries: Loblaw Companies; Choice Properties REIT
- Website: www.weston.ca

George Weston Limited, often referred to as Weston or Weston's, is a Canadian holding company. Founded by George Weston in 1882, the company consists of the Choice Properties real estate investment trust and Loblaw Companies Limited, Canada's largest supermarket retailer, in which it maintains a controlling interest. The company is majority owned by Wittington Investments, Ltd Canada, a holding company that the Weston family are the controlling share holders in. Retail brands include President's Choice, No Name and Joe Fresh. The former Weston Bakeries division, which owned the brands Wonder, Country Harvest, D'Italiano, Ready Bake and Gadoua, was sold off to FGF Brands in 2022.

== History ==
=== Bread route ===
In 1882, Toronto bread salesman George Weston, who got his start at the age of 12 as a baker's apprentice, went into business for himself when he bought a bread route from his employer, G.H. Bowen. Two years later, Weston bought out Bowen's Sullivan Street bakery and began baking and delivering his own bread. His first employee was Charles Upshall, another young baker, and the two worked long hours baking and delivering bread.

Weston's business prospered, particularly with the development of his "Real Home Made Bread," made from a combination of Manitoba No. 1 Hard Wheat and Ontario Fall wheat. His bakery underwent at least four expansions. At a time when many bakers were reluctant to adopt new technology, believing it adversely affected the taste and quality of their bread, Weston began introducing modern equipment to automate the baking process. "He has not spared expense getting in the latest designs of machinery to mix his dough," proclaimed one newspaper ad. Eventually, he renamed his bakery on Sullivan Street the "G. Weston’s Bread Factory."

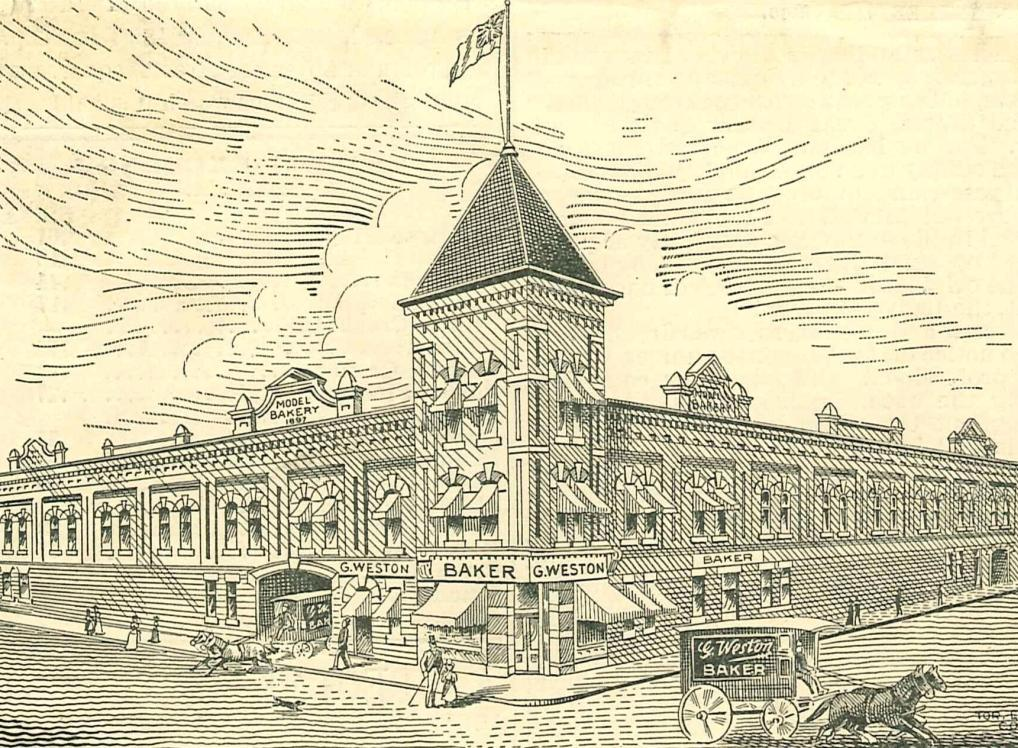
Model Bakery, Toronto, illustration from the Mercantile & Financial Times of Boston, New York and Chicago, summer 1899

=== Model Bakery ===
In October 1897, George Weston unveiled his "Model Bakery", Canada's largest and most modern bread factory, at the corner of Soho and Phoebe streets in Toronto. Newspaper reports told of how Weston had travelled to other countries to inspect the latest in baking technology and that his new establishment represented the best of what he had seen. Not only was the factory hailed for its efficiency and cleanliness, but also its capacity to turn out thousands of loaves of bread:

Remember that bread alone is made in this immense factory, and such bread it is that has made the name of its maker famous. Over 3200 large loaves are turned out on an average daily, but the factory has a capacity of 6,500 loaves. One may judge the largeness of the business done weekly when it takes nearly three hundred barrels of flour to supply the weekly demand. Two teams are kept busy all day Friday and Saturday hauling flour to supply the week’s needs.

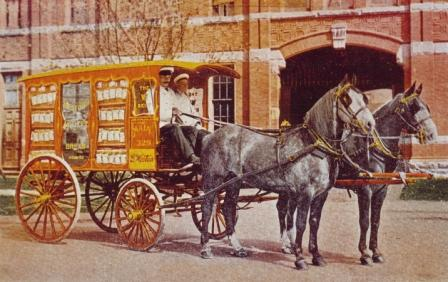
Decorative bread wagon, Model Bakery Co., postcard, Toronto, c. 1908

Although the Model Bakery was well received by the Toronto press, its appearance resulted in a price war, apparently initiated by the city's other bakers. On hearing that competitors were offering cut-rate bread – contrary to a local bakers’ agreement that set a standard price for a loaf of bread – George Weston left the bakers' association and lowered his prices. In retaliation, the competition dropped what they charged at the wholesale level in an apparent attempt to fill store shelves with their bread. In spite of the price war, the Model Bakery continued to expand production such that a year later business had increased by 78 percent. Less than two years later, George Weston was selling his bread to 38 cities and towns beyond Toronto's borders. By 1901, the factory's output had reached 10,000 large loaves a day and its bread was shipped to over 100 communities throughout Ontario. By 1899, Weston had also established in the town of Oshawa, northeast of Toronto, a branch bakeshop, which he described as a "miniature Model Bakery", for the production of bread.

While the Model Bakery established George Weston as Canada's biggest baker, he had already begun to move beyond bread into other lines of baked goods.

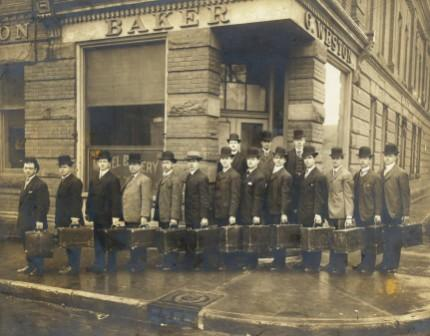
Model Bakery "biscuit travellers" or salesmen, Soho and Phoebe streets, Toronto, postcard, c. 1910

By 1897, he had set up a separate shop for the making of cakes, crumpets, pastries and buns. Then, early in the new century, Weston began making biscuits and sodas. While the bread business was very competitive and typically low margin, biscuits offered higher margins. Within a few years, the Model Bakery had a dozen salesmen taking orders for Weston's biscuits from merchants throughout Ontario. In promoting his new vanilla wafer biscuits, Weston employed a form of early direct marketing. From a decorative bread wagon, salesmen handed out free samples of the new biscuits and told housewives to ask for them at their grocer's.

In 1901, George Weston merged with J.L. Spink, a flour mill operator at Pickering, Ontario, to form the Model Bakery Company. The amalgamation soon raised concerns, though, that the new partnership would result in higher bread prices. In a letter to local newspapers, Weston tried to allay fears of a "Bread Trust" and asserted that rather than an attempt to destroy competition that the merger would reduce the price of bread by cutting out the middleman's profit:

... we are believers in honest competition. Some bakers are endeavouring to fill the minds of the grocers, and the public in general, with the fact that we intend to get control of the bread baking business for the purpose of raising the price of bread to consumers. Now, I wish to give this a straight denial. By the amalgamation of these two concerns, the mill and the bakery, we are going to lessen our expenses, and the public are going to reap the advantage.

Weston further contended that the new venture would ensure the very choicest flour for the Model Bakery and its bread. But while the Weston-Spink partnership lasted five years, for reasons unknown it was eventually dissolved and the baker and miller went their separate ways.

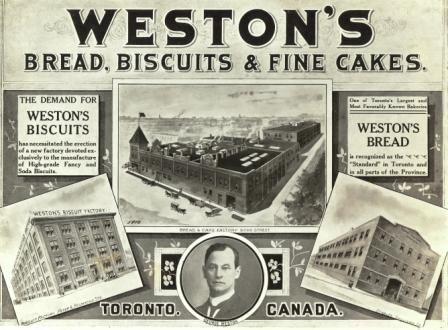
Weston's advertisement, "Bread, Biscuits and Fine Cakes", The Globe, Toronto, 1911

=== Canada Bread ===
In 1911, George Weston entered into another merger, this time with fellow bakers in Toronto, Montreal and Winnipeg, to form the Canada Bread Company. The Model Bakery became part of the assets of Canada Bread and a new Weston's Biscuit Factory went into production at the corner of Peter and Richmond streets in Toronto. Meanwhile, the Canada Bread partners agreed to stay out of the bread making business for at least the next ten years. With the expiration of that non-compete clause, and at the urging of former customers who complained about the quality of the city's bread, George Weston re-entered the bread business in 1921.

=== World War I ===
As World War I dragged on, various shortages arose and some biscuit lines had to be discontinued. In spite of those difficulties the company remained profitable. But with the tragic loss of a youngest son and concern that his eldest son Garfield might not return from overseas duty as a soldier in the Canadian Expeditionary Force, George Weston considered selling the company to competitor Christie, Brown and Company. A letter from Garfield, from the trenches of war-torn France, in which he asked his father to hold on until his return home, convinced George Weston not to sell his business.

=== English Quality Biscuits ===
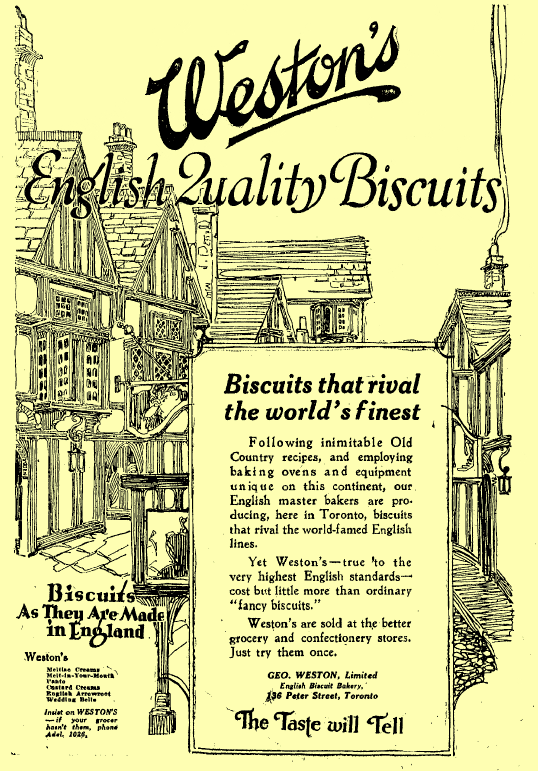
Advertisement for Weston's English Quality Biscuits, Toronto Daily Star, November 15, 1922

In 1922, George and Garfield Weston undertook a new and somewhat risky venture with the introduction of "English Quality Biscuits." While in England as a young Canadian soldier, Garfield had toured the world-famous British biscuit factories and came away convinced that a similar product could be manufactured and successfully marketed in Canada. "After the armistice, he convinced his skeptical father to import machines to make English-style cookies in Canada." In addition to importing biscuit making ovens all the way from England, the company brought master baker William Doyle from London. That year, Weston's English Quality Biscuits were launched with an advertising campaign that included an elaborate display at the Canadian National Exhibition in Toronto:

This unique exhibit is the method chosen by Weston’s to acquaint Exhibition visitors with the fact that they are now making, right here in Toronto, biscuits equal in every respect to the finest imported English lines – the standard of the world. English master bakers and English making machines have been installed at Weston’s new English Biscuit Factory, and the great opportunity of these English lines is proven by the fact that a 24 hour day production has been maintained for several weeks past.

The company also produced a sampler tin of the new biscuits that sold very well. Weston's English Quality Biscuits proved a long-term success and the product line became the basis for the company's continued growth.

=== Expansion ===
With the death of George Weston in 1924, W. Garfield Weston became president of George Weston Limited at the age of 26. Garfield, who had effectively been running the company the past several years, set the firm on a path of expansion. In 1928, he took the company ‘public’ and made his first major acquisition – William Paterson Ltd., a Brantford, Ontario, biscuit and confectionery maker founded in 1863 by William Paterson.

The company also made its first foray into the American market but the effort ended in near disaster. A Weston's English Quality Biscuits factory was set up at Watertown, near Boston, Massachusetts, but after a series of missteps, that included a botched advertising campaign, the plant was closed. It was later realized that a senior manager had secretly been working for the competition. The American company was subsequently reorganized and a new biscuit plant established near Passaic, New Jersey.

=== Depression ===
In spite of the Great Depression, George Weston Limited continued to expand in Ontario and Western Canada. The company bought Lawlor's Bread Limited of Toronto for over a quarter million dollars in 1930. It went on to acquire Regal Bakeries Limited in Ontario in 1931, Independent Biscuit Co. of Calgary that same year, and Lawrence Bread Limited in 1933.

As the Depression deepened and George Weston Limited remained profitable, it bought companies and operations under favourable terms. In 1933, for example, it extended its service area to 100 miles around Toronto with the acquisition of Ontario Bakeries Limited from its trustee and receiver:

In this case, as in nearly every case where the company or its subsidiaries have taken in other plants, the company was able to take advantage of the extraordinary low price obtaining for capital assets during the depression, to expand its business at very low cost to itself and on purchase terms that are scarcely more than rental.

The company went on to acquire McCormick's Limited from its receivers in 1937 and bought Inter City Western Bakeries in 1938. In the United States, it expanded biscuit operations at Passaic, New Jersey, and established a new Weston's Biscuits plant at Battle Creek, Michigan. One long-time Weston executive, Frank Riddell, observed that since nobody had any money in those days that deals were often struck with relatively little cash and a guarantee of Weston stock. In addition to a program of expansion, the profitability of George Weston Limited allowed it to establish a minimum weekly wage for its male employees in 1934.

=== Great Britain ===
The early 1930s saw Garfield Weston pursue an ambitious overseas venture designed not only to extend the commercial interests of the company but also expand desperately needed export markets for Canadian wheat. Weston proposed to acquire bakeries throughout the British Isles that would then import more Canadian grain. Turned down by the banks at home, which considered the idea too risky, Weston arranged a meeting with a group of New York financiers. Among them was Wall Street speculator Ben Smith who bankrolled Weston to the tune of $2 million.

In 1933, George Weston Limited acquired Scottish biscuit maker Mitchell & Muil Limited. The antiquated factory at Aberdeen was shut down and production moved to a new facility at Edinburgh. With modern equipment and facilities, along with a reduced product line of 40 items instead of 400, Garfield Weston dramatically lowered costs and began selling biscuits at half the price of the competition. Other bakeries followed, as Weston quickly acquired a string of bread and biscuits factories, as the overseas business began to rival that of the parent:

All the British and Irish biscuit and bread companies obtained in the last 15 months in the course of Garfield Weston's large-scale British adventure are now reported to have a total volume of sales as great as that of the parent company in Canada, George Weston Ltd. Moreover, Mr. Weston told the shareholders at the annual meeting on March 28 that when plans at present under way are complete, he will have bread and biscuit companies in every strategic centre of England, Scotland, Northern and Southern Ireland.

Later that year, with operations still expanding, George Weston Limited offered its shareholders direct ownership in the overseas venture in a rights issue that transformed the British business into a separate commercial entity. By 1937, with fifteen regional bakeries under the Allied Bakeries banner and the success of the British Isles expansion evident, news headlines back home in Canada hailed Garfield Weston as "Britain’s biggest baker."

=== World War II ===
During World War II, George Weston Limited struggled to maintain production in light of shortages that included basic ingredients such as sugar. Cakes were still made but at times without icing. Labour was also in short supply and salesmen at times served as bakery workers. With most of its biscuit production going to supply the armed forces of Canada and the Allied Powers, the company ran newspaper ads advising customers that Weston products may not always be available:

We regret being unable to supply your grocer regularly with Weston's English Quality Biscuits. Our factories are working at top speed to help supply the biscuit needs of the armed forces of the United Nations. Even the ovens that bake the famous Weston's Soda Biscuits are now turning out "Iron Rations" for our fighting men.

Another wartime ad noted that the company's products were with the 8th Army of the North African campaign. "Those fighting lads who drove Rommel out of Egypt and Libya have been getting Weston's English Quality Biscuits right along. Naturally, we're proud of their choice!". In spite of the war, the company continued to expand. In the United States, it purchased a bankrupt biscuit plant at Salamanca, New York, and acquired the Southern Biscuit Co. of Richmond, Virginia. The National Biscuit Co. in Western Canada was bought, along with Edmonton City Bakery. By 1942, the company reported that Weston operations in Canada, the United States and Great Britain used over 15 million bushels of wheat a year and employed some 16 thousand workers.

The war years also saw the company diversify beyond baking with the purchase of a controlling interest in Western Grocers Ltd., a wholesale food distributor with some 700 associated Red & White stores throughout the prairies. In 1943, Garfield Weston also bought paper manufacturer E.B. Eddy Co. of Hull, Quebec, after he purchased controlling interest from Lord R.B. Bennett, the Canadian former Prime Minister. Some years later, Eddy Paper Co., along with subsidiary E.B. Eddy Co., was bought out by George Weston Limited in a cash and stock deal.

=== Post-war ===
The post-war years saw tremendous growth as the company continued to diversify its holdings not only in terms of consumer products but also with a concerted move into retailing. In 1948, the company bought William Neilson Limited of Toronto, Ontario, Canada's largest chocolate and ice cream maker. A year earlier, Garfield Weston struck a deal to acquire a block of 100,000 shares of Loblaw Groceterias Co. Limited, one of the country's leading supermarket chains By 1953, George Weston Limited had established majority control. Three years later, the company announced it had purchased a 25 percent stake in Chicago-based National Tea Co., a large U.S. supermarket chain with more than 700 stores. By the early 1960s, it had gained controlling interest in National through subsidiary Loblaw Companies Limited. In 1966, Howardsgate Holdings, owners of Britain and Europe's largest operator of supermarkets, Fine Fare, was purchased from another Weston family business, DICOA, before being sold back to Associated British Foods.

=== Diversification and disclosure ===
During the 1960s, the company continued to diversify beyond baking. Along with the 1962 acquisition of Eddy Paper Co., George Weston Limited moved into fish processing on the East and West coasts with its purchase of Connors Brothers of New Brunswick and British Columbia Packers Limited. With the full extent of the company's holdings often unknown by even senior executives, not to mention the public, George Weston Limited was under increasing pressure from Canadian parliamentarians to reveal its corporate structure and holdings. In December 1966, it provided shareholders and the media with a detailed chart showing various subsidiaries, wholly owned and controlled. The Financial Post newspaper led with headlines that read, "Weston group unveils huge empire" and reported on how 150 Weston led companies accounted for $800 million in assets and produced $2.8 billion in annual sales. While the extent of the "Weston empire" became the lead business story, it apparently resulted in little or no negative reaction in terms of press coverage. Some months later, in fact, one news story went so far as to feature the headline, "Garfield Weston: Our champ at corporate empire-building."

=== Consolidation ===
By the late early 1970s, the company's aggressive expansion and acquisitions strategy, which in the past had produced such remarkable growth, was showing signs of strain. Retail sales and earnings were in decline as Loblaws’ aging chain of supermarkets looked increasingly uncompetitive. In 1972, Garfield Weston, Chairman of George Weston Limited, named his youngest son, W. Galen Weston, Chief Executive Officer of Loblaw Companies Limited. The appointment came at a time when Loblaws appeared all but bankrupt, with its share of the crucial Ontario market cut in half as a result of price wars among the major chains. At the same time, the company found its hands tied by leaseback agreements that prevented it from closing money-losing stores. With few assets, Loblaw was also deeply in debt. In spite of all the problems, though, Galen Weston felt that Loblaws had the potential to be the nucleus of one of the finest retailers in Canada. "As a 200 store chain, we didn’t look very good. As a 100 store chain, Loblaws looked very good indeed."

Leaseback agreements were bought out and the company began closing unprofitable stores. Old warehouse operations were shut down and a new distribution centre built. The company also initiated a broad marketing strategy that saw a prototype store renovated and remodelled in new colours and a new Loblaws logo. Toronto designer Don Watt introduced new wood panelling, big moveable display bins, and huge photos of fresh fruits, vegetables, and meats. The produce section was doubled in size and moved to the front of the store. Sales dramatically increased and more stores were remodelled and rebranded. Meanwhile, a new advertising campaign featured Canadian actor William Shatner of Star Trek fame, who told television audiences to "Come on over to Loblaws" and "More than the price is right ... but by gosh the price is right." In 1974, W. Galen Weston was appointed Chairman and Managing Director of George Weston Limited, and subsequently company President.

But as Loblaws regained market share, profitability south of the border, at National Tea Co., deteriorated. A similar program of rationalization saw hundreds of National stores closed and warehouses consolidated, while other outlets underwent renovation and rebranding. By 1974, of 1,100 retail food outlets across North America, 367 stores were closed, while 81 new stores had been built. Unprofitable divisions, namely Chicago, Syracuse and California, were sold. Although some supermarket assets were later acquired, eventually the company would divest itself of all retail and wholesale holdings in the United States.

Management continued to divest non-core assets through the decade as it shifted the company's focus to earnings rather than sales growth. In 1978, both George Weston Limited and Loblaw Companies Limited returned to profitability and two years later Weston's reported record earnings of $76 million on revenue of $6 billion. Once again, the company was in a position to make acquisitions and purchased Stroehmann Brothers of Pennsylvania, a baker of bread and rolls, for $32 million. George Weston Limited next made a well publicized bid to acquire controlling interest in the Hudson's Bay Company, with its diverse array of retail, resource and real estate holdings, in 1979. But as a bidding war ensued with the Ken Thomson and family, Galen Weston walked away from the process, noting that it would have cost "another $150 million to bump our offer up again" and had simply become too expensive.

=== Private labels ===
In addition to revitalizing the look of its stores, Loblaw management earmarked $40 million for the development of its in-house, private label program. Generally regarded as inferior to the national brands, CEO W. Galen Weston put renewed emphasis on the quality of store brands:

We found it essential to change products and services before redesigning their image. For example, nothing is more disappointing for a consumer than to buy a private label product because of the attractiveness of its redesigned label and then find that the same quality that had disappointed her previously had not been improved.

In 1978, at a time of rampant food price inflation, Loblaws unveiled a new line of 16 generic "no-name" products. Sales proved stronger than anticipated and within a year the number of No Name product offerings had increased to over a hundred. Months later, the first "no frills" store was launched, which featured No Name and a limited selection of 500 discount items. Two more Toronto area stores follow within a few months. The No Name line continued to grow and gourmet items were even added to the generic line-up. Then, in 1984, Loblaw launched President's Choice, a premium line of private label items, with each product personally endorsed by Loblaws president Dave Nichol and promoted in the popular advertising supplement Dave Nichol's Insider's Report. No name and President's Choice products would go on to account for 25 percent of the company's domestic grocery sales or double the industry average.

=== Free trade ===
With the signing of the Canada–U.S. Free Trade Agreement in 1988 and the North American Free Trade Agreement in 1994, George Weston Limited found it necessary to once again re-evaluate its asset mix. A series of divestitures followed over the next decade as the company struggled to remain competitive within a continental free trade zone. Companies that were sold off included biscuit and ice cream making, chocolate bar manufacturing, sugar refining, milling, and paper and tissue making. In 1989, the company sold its White Swan tissue division to Scott Paper Ltd. for $110 million. While Weston's had acquired the Canadian operations of Cadbury in 1987 and merged them with William Neilson Limited, after attempting to break into emerging markets, by selling chocolate bars in Mexico, it finally sold its chocolate operations to Cadbury Schweppes in 1996. In 1998, long time holding E. B. Eddy was sold to Domtar in a cash-and-stock deal worth (CAN) $800 million.

Meanwhile, under Loblaw president Richard Currie, the company's retail food operations continued to expand under a variety of regional banners that included Loblaws, no frills, Zehrs and Fortinos in Ontario, the Real Canadian Superstore in Northern Ontario and Western Canada, and the Real Atlantic Superstore and SuperValu in Atlantic Canada. In particular, Dominion Stores Limited, Loblaw's lead competitor in Ontario, had failed to keep up with the times and the rival chain finally sold off its better stores and shuttered the rest. By the mid 1980s, with a 14 percent share of the $35 billion supermarket business in Canada and 41 consecutive quarters of higher earnings, Loblaw Companies had gone "from a sorry loser without a future into Canada's largest and perhaps most thriving food distributor". Nevertheless, Loblaw still had occasion to stumble, at times badly. While large-scale "combination stores", with their mix of food and general merchandise, had worked so well in Western Canada, the introduction of SuperCentres in Central Canada a few years later resulted in huge losses. The company's policy to own many of its properties, instead of simply leasing, gave it the "operating flexibility" to rent out redundant space and thereby mitigate losses.

=== Acquisition and divestiture ===
On the acquisition side, George Weston Limited expanded within its traditional base of operations with the purchase of the Ontario assets of General Bakeries, a subsidiary of Dominion Stores Limited, in 1985, as Toronto financier Conrad Black divested holdings. Along with a number of bread and roll plants, the deal included ownership of the Wonder trademark in Canada, which would become an important brand for Weston Bakeries Limited.

In 1995, Loblaw divested the last of its U.S. retail operations with the sale of supermarkets in St. Louis (originally bought from Kroger) and New Orleans. In spite of the retreat, the company reiterated its overall strategy to take advantage of any opportunity that presented itself:

The company is prepared to enter new markets through the opening of new stores, as in its stated plan, to enter the Quebec market, or from focused acquisitions when opportunities arise. The company is also prepared to exit particular markets and redeploy assets elsewhere when it is strategically advantageous to do so, as demonstrated by the disposal of the United States retail business...

But while Loblaw no longer owned stores in the U.S., it had not made a complete retreat from the American market, with its President's Choice products available on the shelves of over 1,700 supermarkets in 35 States.

In 1998, the company made two major regional acquisitions, namely the 80 store Agora Foods chain in Atlantic Canada and Provigo, a 250 store chain of supermarkets in the province of Quebec. Then, in 2001, the company made a major new thrust into the U.S. fresh baked goods market with the purchase of Bestfoods Baking Co., a division of Anglo-Dutch conglomerate Unilever, for (U-S) $1.76 billion. Bestfood, with nineteen plants throughout the United States, included such well-known brands as Entenmann's, Thomas' English Muffins, and Arnold Bread.

=== Retrenchment ===
In 2006, chronic supply chain problems and the first year-end loss for Loblaw in almost two decades resulted in the resignation of John Lederer as president and W. Galen Weston as chairman. Galen G. Weston was appointed to the new position of executive chairman, with Allan Leighton as deputy chairman and Mark Foote president. The introduction of a 'fix the basics' program saw the company refocus attention on food retailing, with less emphasis on general merchandising. But senior executives acknowledged that the company's turnaround would take at least three years to accomplish. Meantime, Loblaw returned to profitability in 2007.

=== Divestitures and acquisitions ===
Despite the 2008 financial crisis, George Weston Limited signed two major deals. In October, it announced that Neilson Dairy was being sold to Saputo Inc. for (CAN) $465 million, followed months later by word that Grupo Bimbo, the Mexican baking conglomerate, had agreed to buy U.S. based George Weston Bakeries, which consisted of the former Bestfoods Baking assets, along with Stroehmann Bakeries, for (U-S) $2.5 billion. Chairman W. Galen Weston noted that the Grupo Bimbo sale represented the company's biggest deal ever and along with the sale of the dairy division would result in $5 billion in cash on corporate balance sheets, thereby allowing the company to consider future acquisitions. In 2009, T&T Supermarket, a Chinese grocery store chain, was acquired by Loblaw.

While the Grupo Bimbo deal saw George Weston Limited divest most of its fresh baked goods assets in the United States, the company still maintained U.S. market share. In addition to Interbake, a manufacturer of cookies and ice cream novelty treats, it acquired Keystone Bakery, a U.S. maker of frozen cupcakes, donuts, and cookies, for (U-S) $185 million in 2010. That year it also bought ACE Bakery, a Canadian maker of artisan and European-style breads, for (CAN) $110 million. In what press reports called "a surprise move," the company announced in late 2010 that it would pay a special dividend of $7.75 per share to stockholders, worth one billion dollars.

In 2011, Weston Foods worked out a deal to acquire bankrupt Colonial Cookies of Kitchener, Ontario - a baker of Loblaw private label products and in particular its bestselling President's Choice The Decadent Chocolate Chip Cookie.

=== Legal entanglements ===
In January 2018, Weston and its subsidiary Loblaws were implicated in price-fixing the cost of bread in Canada, taking part from 2001 until 2015. The two companies agreed to pay $500 million to settle the lawsuit in July 2024, with the class action lawsuit against several other retailers continuing.

Also in 2018, Weston subsidiary Loblaws was embroiled in the Tax Court of Canada in relation to a banking subsidiary in the Caribbean. It involved a Loblaws Inc. subsidiary in Barbados that had been renamed Glenhuron Bank. The Canada Revenue Agency claimed "that a vice-president at Loblaws parent company George Weston Ltd. 'was unable or unwilling to answer many questions' during pre-trial discovery hearings, and later requested that CEO Galen Weston Jr. answer under oath "some of its pre-trial discovery questions about 'the purpose for which GBL was established and the activities of GBL during the years at issue.'" The result was that Loblaws was ordered by Associate Chief Justice Lucie Lamarre to pay back taxes on foreign accrual property income (FAPI) of $368 million. The company appealed to Justice Judith Woods of the Federal Court of Appeal who reversed the Lamarre order when she found that Glenhuron "bought short-term U.S. debt securities, entered into swaps and managed investments on behalf of other companies related to Loblaw and its parent, George Weston Ltd., among other things — mostly did business at arm’s length with those it entered into contracts for the debt and swaps". The CRA appealed the Woods ruling to the Supreme Court of Canada. The leave was granted on 29 October 2020. On 18 February 2021 the appeal hearing was scheduled for 13 May, and on 22 March leave to intervene was granted to the Attorney General of Ontario and the Canadian Bankers’ Association. The Supreme Court of Canada (SCC) case regarding "Glenhuron Bank" was officially titled Canada v. Loblaw Financial Holdings Inc., 2021 SCC 51. In a unanimous decision, the Court ruled in favour of Loblaw Financial, confirming that the income earned by its Barbados-based subsidiary, Glenhuron Bank, was not taxable in Canada as foreign accrual property income (FAPI) for the years in question.

=== Sale of bakery business ===
In March 2021, Weston announced that it would soon hold an auction of its "Weston Foods bakery business", with sales "under brands such as Wonder Bread, ACE Bakery, Country Harvest, D'Italiano and others". The division accounted for $2.1 billion in 2020 sales, or less than 10% of total.

In October 2021, the deal to sell Weston Foods' fresh and frozen bread business to FGF Brands Incorporated of North York, Ontario was announced, which was expected to close in early 2022.

== Brands ==
=== Grocery ===
Chains:

- Atlantic Cash & Carry
- Atlantic Superstore
- Atlantic SuperValu
- Axep
- Dominion
- Entrepôts Presto / Club Entrepôt
- Extra Foods
- Fortinos
- Freshmart
- L'intermarché
- Loblaws/Loblaw Great Food
- Lucky Dollar Foods
- Maxi/Maxi & Cie
- NG Cash & Carry
- No Frills
- Pharmaprix
- Provigo
- The Real Canadian Superstore/Loblaw Superstore
- Real Canadian Liquorstore
- Real Canadian Wholesale Club
- Red & White Food Stores
- SaveEasy (formerly Atlantic SaveEasy)
- Shop Easy Foods
- Shoppers Drug Mart/Shoppers
- SuperValu
- Valu-mart
- Your Independent Grocer
- Zehrs, operating under the Zehrs Markets, Zehrs Food Plus and Zehrs Great Food banners

Brands:

- President's Choice
- No Name
- Exact
- Blue Menu
- Joe Fresh
- J± (electronics)
- Theodre and Pringle (opticals)
- Teddy's Choice
- PC Splendido
- Bella Tavola
- PC Premium Black Label
- Joe Pet Catz & Dawgz
- PC Organic
- The Health Clinic by Shoppers
- LifeMark
- Life @ Home

== Corporate governance ==
The current members of the Board of Directors of George Weston Limited are: Galen G. Weston (Chairman), Alannah Weston (Deputy Chairman), Andrew A. Ferrier, Isabelle Marcoux, Sarabjit (Sabi) S. Marwah, Gordon M. Nixon, J. Robert S. Prichard, Robert Sawyer, Christi Strauss, and Barbara Stymiest.

== Operations ==
Weston's operations include more than 50 facilities across Canada employing over 5,000 staff in manufacturing facilities, distribution centres and corporate environments.

== Arms ==
Coat of arms of George Weston Limited

Notes
Granted 24 April 1997.
Crest
A beaver sejant erect Proper grasping in the paws a cornucopia Or issuant therefrom a flow of bezants.
Escutcheon
Or on a pale Vert between two eagles displayed Sable their heads respectant beaked and membered Gules a cone point upwards Argent on a chief wavy Azure three fish fretted between two garbs Or banded Gules.
Supporters
On a mound Vert two eagles wings elevated and addorsed Sable beaked and membered Gules each gorged of a collar Argent charged of a maple leaf Gules.
Motto
Probabit Gustus

== See also ==
- Associated British Foods – the company built by W. Garfield Weston and later managed by son Garry Weston
