= Richard Currie =

Canadian businessman

Richard James Currie OC (born 1937 in Saint John, New Brunswick) is a Canadian businessman.

== Education ==
He entered the University of New Brunswick in 1955 on a Beaverbrook Scholarship and was elected president of the first-year class. He later received a Bachelor of Engineering in Chemistry degree from the Technical University of Nova Scotia in 1960. He worked as an engineer until 1968, when he entered Harvard University to earn a Master of Business Administration degree in 1970.

== Career ==
In 1960, he joined Atlantic Sugar Refineries as a Process Engineer and was a Refining Superintendent from 1963 to 1968. After graduating from Harvard in 1970, he became a Senior Associate at McKinsey & Co., a management consultant firm based in New York City.

In 1972, he joined Loblaws as a Vice-President, becoming Executive Vice-President in 1974, and President in 1976. Loblaws increased its market share over 350 times in 25 years while under his control, reaching $14 billion before he stepped down on December 31, 2000. Through this, it became the largest private sector employer in Canada.

In 1996, he was appointed President of Loblaws parent company, George Weston Ltd., where he increased the share price from $16 to $123. In 2002 he stepped down from Weston and was appointed Chairman of BCE Inc. on April 24 of that year.

He, along with Lynton Wilson, Anthony S. Fell, James Fleck, Hal Jackman and John McArthur, helped establish a chair in Canadian business history at the Joseph L. Rotman School of Management, which is the first chair of its kind in Canada. Worth $3 million, it will help fund courses and research related to the progress of the commerce industry in Canada, along with the legal, economic and political events that impacted its history.

He was the chairman of BCE Inc. and Bell Canada from 2002 to 2009 and currently sits on the board of directors of CAE, and Staples, Inc. and is also a trustee of The Art Gallery of Ontario and a director of Historical Foundation of Canada. Along with these titles, he is also chairman of the board of Telesat and was a director of Imperial Oil Limited, and a member of the international advisory boards of RJR Nabisco and Jacobs Suchard.

== University of New Brunswick involvement ==
On May 24, 2003, he was appointed Chancellor of the University of New Brunswick by the lieutenant-governor in council, at UNB's 174th Encaenia. His duties are to serve as the honorary head of UNB and also as a member of its board of governors.

In 2004, he established the Blake-Kirkpatrick Scholarships (now the Currie Scholarship) in memory of his two grandmothers: Ida Mae Blake and Jannet Kirkpatrick.

On October 20, 2005, the University of New Brunswick established a Chair in Nanotechnology in his honour. This is the first Chair in Nanotechnology in Canada.

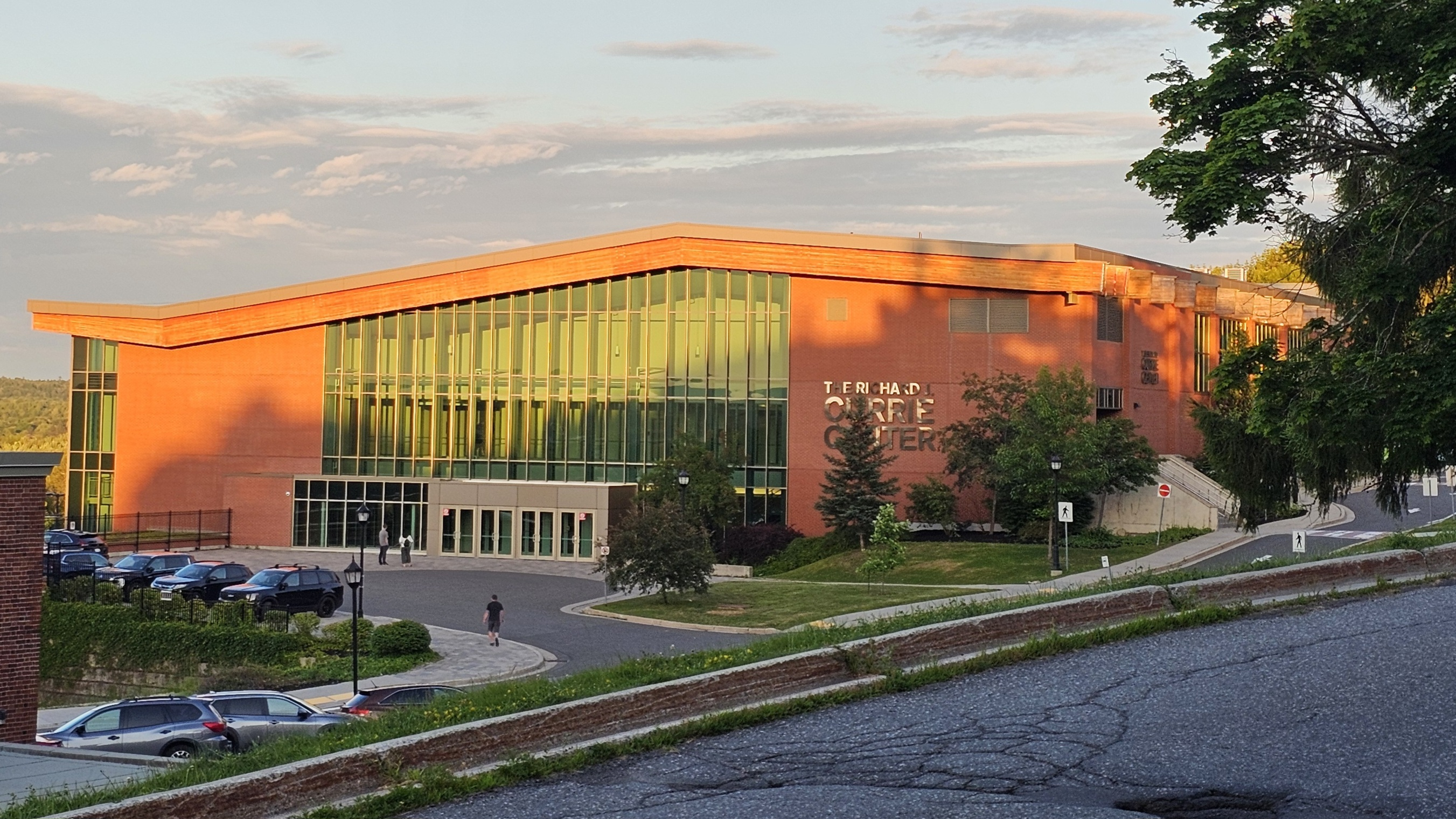
The Richard J. Currie Center in 2026

In Fall 2011 work was completed on the Richard J. Currie Center, a five-storey, 139,000-square-foot athletics and gymnasium complex, named in honor of Currie, who was also the primary donor. Currie donated over $20 million toward the construction of the building, the largest single donation a New Brunswick university has ever received.

== Awards ==
- 1997, Made a member of the Order of Canada
- 1997, Distinguished Canadian Retailer of the Year Award
- 2001, Awarded Canada's Outstanding CEO of the Year
- 2004, Promoted to Officer of the Order of Canada
- 2005, Awarded Retail Council of Canada's Lifetime Achievement Award
- Inducted into the Canadian Business Hall of Fame
- 2010, Awarded Doctor of Letters as an honorary degree from Dalhousie University, Nova Scotia
