= Choice Properties REIT =

Canadian real estate investment trust

Choice Properties Real Estate Investment Trust
- Type: Public
- Traded as: TSX: CHP.UN
- Industry: Real estate investment trust
- Founded: 2013; 13 years ago
- Headquarters: 22 St. Clair Avenue East, Toronto, Ontario, Canada
- Key people: Rael L. Diamond (president and CEO)
- Parent: George Weston Limited
- Website: choicereit.ca

Choice Properties Real Estate Investment Trust, commonly referred to as Choice Properties, is a Canadian unincorporated, open-ended real estate investment trust (REIT) based in Toronto, Ontario. It is the largest real estate investment trust in Canada, with an enterprise value of $16 billion. It mainly owns Canadian retail properties anchored by its major tenant and majority unit holder, Loblaw Companies, Canada's largest food retailer, which is controlled by the Weston family. It is listed on the Toronto Stock Exchange.

== History ==
In December 2012, Loblaw announced that it would spin-off most of its real estate properties into a new publicly listed real estate investment trust. The move would allow Loblaw to monetize the value of its real estate holdings, invest in its grocery business, and take advantage of the tax advantages of the REIT structure. On July 5, 2013, the new REIT, called Choice Properties, held an IPO on the Toronto Stock Exchange. Loblaw initially transferred 426 properties, worth $7 billion, to the new company. The mainly retail properties represented 75% of Loblaw's real estate assets. The IPO raised $400 million, and was the largest on the Toronto Stock Exchange that year. Loblaw retained 83.1% ownership in the new company after the IPO, and its parent company George Weston Limited had a 5.6% interest.

In February 2018, Choice announced that it would acquire Canadian Real Estate Investment Trust (CREIT), a diversified commercial REIT, for $3.9-billion. With the CREIT acquisition, Choice owned 752 properties worth $16 billion, and became Canada's largest REIT. The deal was made in part to allow Choice to diversify its portfolio into industrial and other non-retail property. After the transaction went through in May 2018, Choice's assets were 78% retail, 14% industrial, and 8% offices. Loblaw owned 62% of the new company, while former CREIT unitholders owned 27%.

== Properties ==
Choice primarily owns Canadian retail properties anchored by its Loblaw Company stores. It also owns other commercial properties. As of the end of December 2017, the company owned 546 properties, with a gross leasable area of 4,100,000 square metres (44,100,000 sq ft), and a total value of $9.6 billion.

The company is currently engaged in mixed-use re-developments in several sites that it owns, including at Bloor and Dundas West in Toronto, and the Golden Mile in Scarborough.
