= ACE Bakery =

Maker of artisan breads and baked goods, based in Toronto

ACE Bakery logo

ACE Bakery is a maker of European-style, artisan breads and baked goods. The company, based in Toronto, has some 35 varieties of bread. According to Toronto Life, ACE Bakery's bread is preservative free and from natural starters. In addition to other products, including a line of granola and artisan crisps, marketed across Canada and parts of the United States. Along with breads, ACE Bakery also makes par-baked or partially baked, flash-frozen dough. Founded by a Caledon, Ontario husband and wife, the company is today owned by FGF Brands.

== History ==
In 1982, Martin Connell, a business executive, began baking baguettes, as an early-morning weekend hobby, in the kitchen of his home near Caledon, Ontario. Connell and spouse Linda Haynes, a former television producer, continued to experiment with bread-making techniques and eventually built a small "bakehouse" on the property. They also began visiting bakeries in North America and Europe, as they considered the possibility of starting their own business.

Connell and Haynes opened ACE Bakery at 548 King Street West, downtown Toronto, in March 1993. Located in a former handbag factory, the bakery cafe was initially a 100-loaf-a-day operation. From inception, the couple pledged that a portion of all after-tax profits would be directed to Calmeadow, a charitable foundation in support of micro-financing they had established a decade earlier. By 1996, ACE Bakery sales had reached approximately $4 million. A year later, the business was moved to a larger, 23,000-square-foot facility in North York, which was eventually doubled in size.

In 2001, ACE Bakery introduced a line of frozen dough, a process in which the bread was 85 percent baked and then flash frozen. The new product was sold to in-store bakeries and restaurants in Ontario, parts of New York and Michigan, as well as resorts in the Bahamas.

In terms of marketing and promotions, Haynes published "The ACE Bakery Cookbook: Recipes for and with Bread," in 2003, which became a bestseller. It was followed three years later by a second book, entitled "More from ACE Bakery."

By 2008, the company's annual sales approached $50 million and were growing at a double-digit rate. That year, Connell and Haynes, along with Canadian investors Birch Hill Equity Partners, sold ACE Bakery to Glencoe Capital, a Chicago-based private equity firm. Three years later, ACE was acquired by Weston Foods Canada Inc., a subsidiary of George Weston Limited, for $110 million.

The company announced plans to construct a bakery in the United States in 2012. The facility, located in Cherokee County, South Carolina, cost $18.4 million. Five years later, the company invested $31.9 million to expand its operations in Cherokee County.
