= Currie Scholarship =

The Currie Undergraduate Scholarship (formerly known as the Blake-Kirkpatrick scholarship) is Atlantic Canada's largest undergraduate scholarship, and is awarded to four students each year by the University of New Brunswick. It was established in 2004 by UNB Chancellor Emeritus Richard J. Currie.

== Criteria ==
Applicants should submit an essay (not less than 250 words) to the Selection Committee giving evidence of their leadership capabilities, including (but not limited to) school and extracurricular activities. Also required in the essay is evidence of overcoming barriers or difficult situations. Applications not meeting all three criteria will automatically be disregarded.

== Value of the Scholarship ==
The value of the scholarship used to depend on the university program chosen by the winner. However, since the Engineering programs have been reduced to four years, the value of the scholarship remains constant from program to program.

Each scholarship winner is awarded $65,000 over four (4) years as follows:

- Year 1: $20,000
- Year 2: $20,000
- Year 3: $15,000
- Year 4: $10,000

== Selection Committee ==
The selection committee consists of:

- Mrs. C. Elizabeth Meier, B.A. '71, M.Sc. '75, B.Sc.N. '86 (2004 - present);
- Ms. Beth Currie-Watt, B.P.E. '93 (2012 - present);
- Dr. Taylor C. Steele, B.Sc.E. '13, Ph.D. '19, P.Eng. (2019 - present)
