= Fraser-Hickson Library =

The Fraser-Hickson Institute is a historic Montreal organization. It was born from the Fraser Institute, which was one of Montreal’s first public libraries, opening its doors in 1885. Now known as an early literacy organization, it takes root in a century-long public library that underwent a tranformation.

Today, as a charitable organization known as the Fraser-Hickson Institute, the organization develops and delivers early literacy programs for children aged 0 to 8 in partnership with community organizations serving vulnerable and underserved populations. Its programs aim to contribute to improving literacy levels in Quebec by supporting the development of foundational literacy skills during early childhood.

Its flagship program, **minibiblioPLUS**, was launched in Montreal in 2013 and provides community partners with access to children’s books, early literacy resources, training, and reading activities designed to encourage positive reading habits from an early age.

"Today, in a radically different context from that of its birth and by means that its founder would not have imagined, Fraser-Hickson continues its mandate to encourage reading and to strengthen the ability of citizens to read."

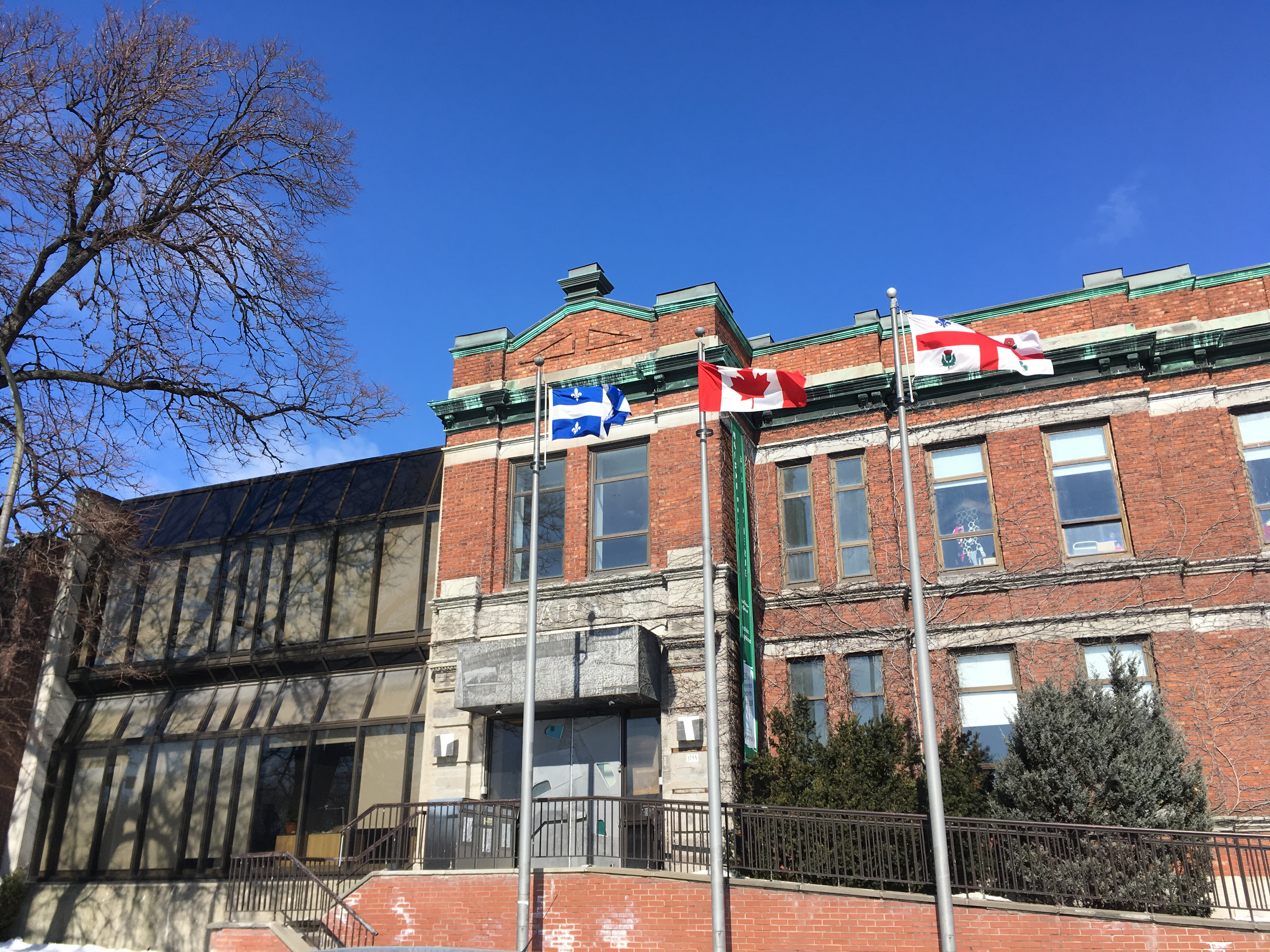
The Fraser-Hickson Library(minibiblioPLUS) is located in the basement of the Notre-Dame-de-Grâce library

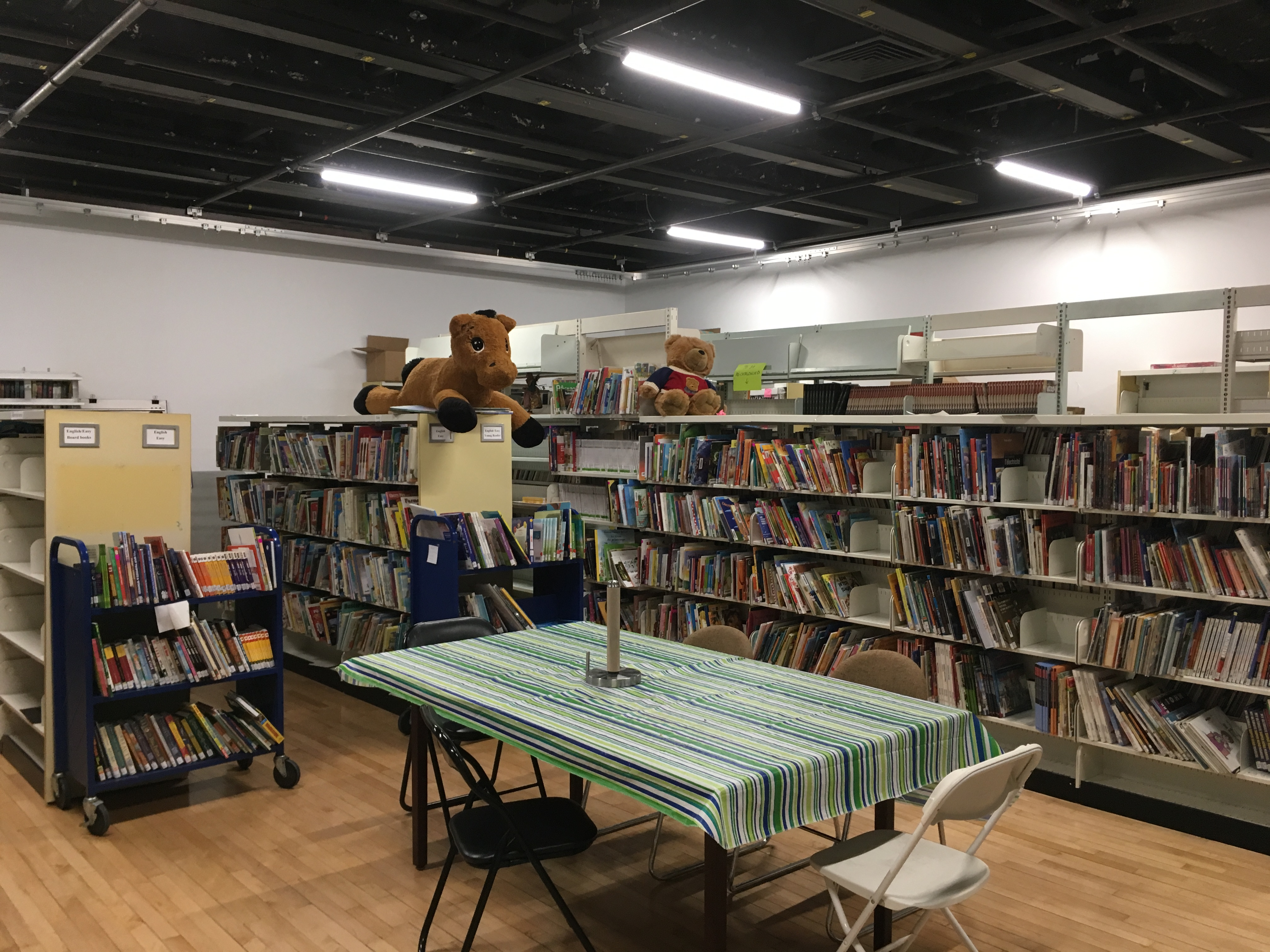
Collection of the minibiblioPLUS library

.

== History ==
In 1885, the Fraser Institute opened as the first free library in Montreal. In April 1870, the prosperous local businessman Hugh Fraser drew up his will with the help of his lawyer John Abbott. Less than a month later, Fraser died and the majority of his fortune was spent on "establishing an institution accessible to all honest and respectable people of all ranks and without distinction" with the aim of "helping to spread knowledge by giving free access to books, scientific objects and subjects and works of art to all who wish. ” For more than 70 years, the Institute was located at Burnside Hall, at the intersection of University and Dorchester streets (now boulevards Robert-Bourassa and René-Lévesque).

In 1956, Doctor of Philosophy J.W.A. Hickson bequeathed $ 1.9 million to the Institute on condition that his name be added to the organization's name. Three years later, the Fraser-Hickson Institute moved to the corner of Kensington and Somerled streets, in the Notre-Dame-de-Grâce district. Despite its great success and its cultural value, financial pressures continued to grow until the early 2000s and the building on Kensington Street closed in 2007.

In 2008, the building was sold to a private school. Most of its collection of over 180,000 documents was stored during the search for new sites and partnerships. With the establishment of a network of public libraries by the city of Montreal and the development of new technologies, the Fraser-Hickson Institute was faced with the challenge to renew itself.

Fraser-Hickson entered a tranformation phase where it moved from being a traditional library serving a physical location to becoming a community-based literacy organization reaching children and families across Quebec. The transformation preserved the spirit of its founders—ensuring free access to knowledge—while adapting that mission to the needs of a new generation.

== minibiblioPLUS ==
This transformation came by bringing books closer to the children and families who needed them most. In 2013, under the leadership of Executive Director Helen Fortin, Fraser-Hickson partnered with the YMCA of Notre-Dame-de-Grâce to create a small community library within the organization’s programs. This simple idea—bringing a curated selection of books directly into community settings—became the foundation of the minibiblio concept.

Meeting a resounding success, the minibiblioPLUS program continued to develop and expand.As the initiative grew, Fraser-Hickson’s leadership recognized that access to books was only part of the solution. Young children also needed meaningful interactions around reading, support for families, and adults equipped with the tools to encourage early literacy. The organization expanded the model by combining mini-libraries with reading activities, training, and resources, creating what became minibiblioPLUS.

Research demonstrates that positive and repeated experiences with books and shared reading during early childhood play an important role in the later development of reading and writing skills. [reference to be added]

The program is offered in partnership with community organizations, early childhood settings, and other organizations serving children aged 0 to 8 and their families, particularly those from vulnerable or underserved communities. It provides free access to a collection of children's books, as well as training, resources, and support to help partners implement regularly reading activities with children.

A distinctive feature of the program is its inclusion of animated reading sessions led by trained volunteers within the partner organization, designed to provide young children with regular opportunities to engage with books and help foster positive reading habits from an early age.

minibiblioPLUS aims to contribute to improving literacy levels in Quebec by supporting, from birth, the development of foundational early literacy skills among young children, including oral language, vocabulary, phonological awareness, knowledge of letters, and an understanding of the relationship between spoken language and written text.

== Those who paved the way ==
During Fraser-Hickson Library’s period of transformation, the organization was guided by a committed group of board leaders and supporters who helped preserve its historic mission while adapting it to the changing needs of communities. It is thanks to the leadership of Executive Director **Helen Fortin**, and the support of board members including **John Dinsmore** and **Nicholas Hoare**, that Fraser-Hickson moved successfully to a community-based literacy program focused on bringing books and reading experiences directly to children and families.

Nicholas Hoare, a longtime bookseller and advocate for literacy, supported the vision that access to books should extend beyond the walls of a library and reach children in the places where they live and learn.

Alongside other longstanding supporters, including Warren Allmand, the organization’s leaders helped guide Fraser-Hickson through this renewal of its original mission: ensuring that books, knowledge, and the opportunity to learn remained accessible to future generations.

In 2021, after Helen Fortin joined the Fraser-Hickson Board of Governors, Asha Dixit was appointed as Executive Director.

Fraser-Hickson is now located on rue Botrel, in the premises of the Notre-Dame-de-Grâce library. Early literacy programs are offered to daycares, community centers and other organizations that cater to 0-8 years old children.
