= Linda Haynes (businesswoman) =

Linda Haynes is a Canadian businessperson, co-founder of ACE Bakery Limited, Calmeadow and the Haynes-Connell Foundation, and philanthropist.

For her philanthropic work, Haynes was awarded the Member of the Order of Canada in 2006, and invested in 2007.

Haynes was employed as a television producer, and later became a stay-at-home mother. Her husband, Martin Connell, was employed in the oil and gas industry. He began baking bread as a hobby in the early 1980s. The family's hobby became such that they opened a bakery in 1993, with a charitable aim.

She is author of The Ace Bakery Cookbook, which received the Gourmand World Cookbook Awards' "Best Bread Book." She also wrote More from Ace Bakery and co-authored Two Dishes (2009).

Haynes and Connell had homes in Toronto and Caledon, as of 2008.
