= Sullivan Street Bakery =

Bakery in the United States

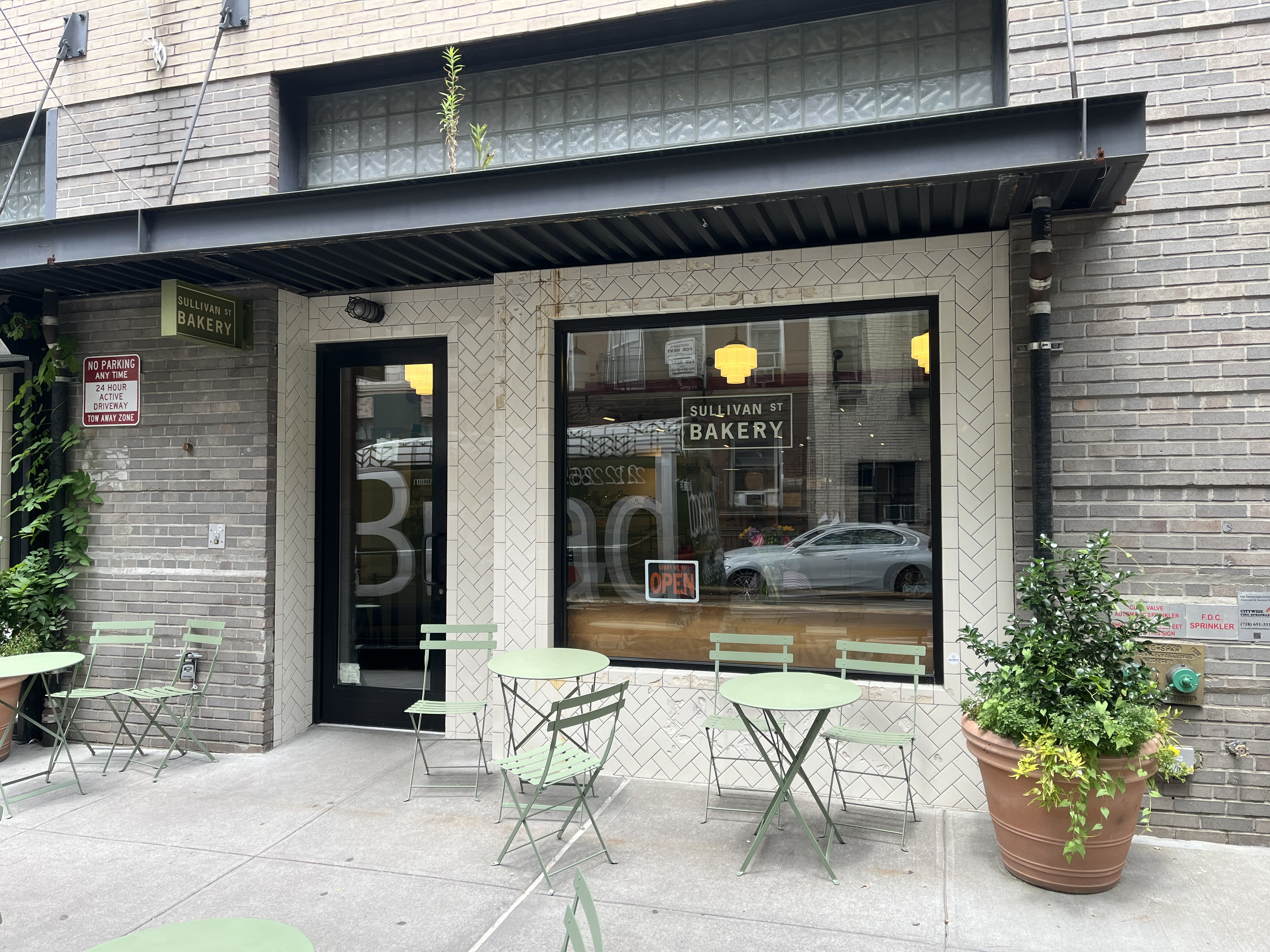
- The exterior of the location in Hell's Kitchen, Manhattan in 2024

Restaurant information
- Location: United States
- Website: sullivanstreetbakery.com

Sullivan Street Bakery is a bakery with locations in New York City and Miami, in the United States.

== See also ==
- List of bakeries
