= George Weston =

Canadian businessman (1864–1924)

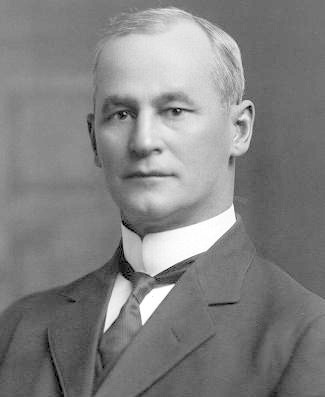
George Weston in 1911

George Weston (March 23, 1864 – April 6, 1924) was an American-born Canadian businessman and the founder of George Weston Limited. He worked in a Canadian bread factory in Toronto. Weston began his career at the age of 12 as a baker's apprentice and went on to become a bread route salesman. He was also a Methodist as well as a municipal politician who served four years as alderman on Toronto City Council.

== Early years ==
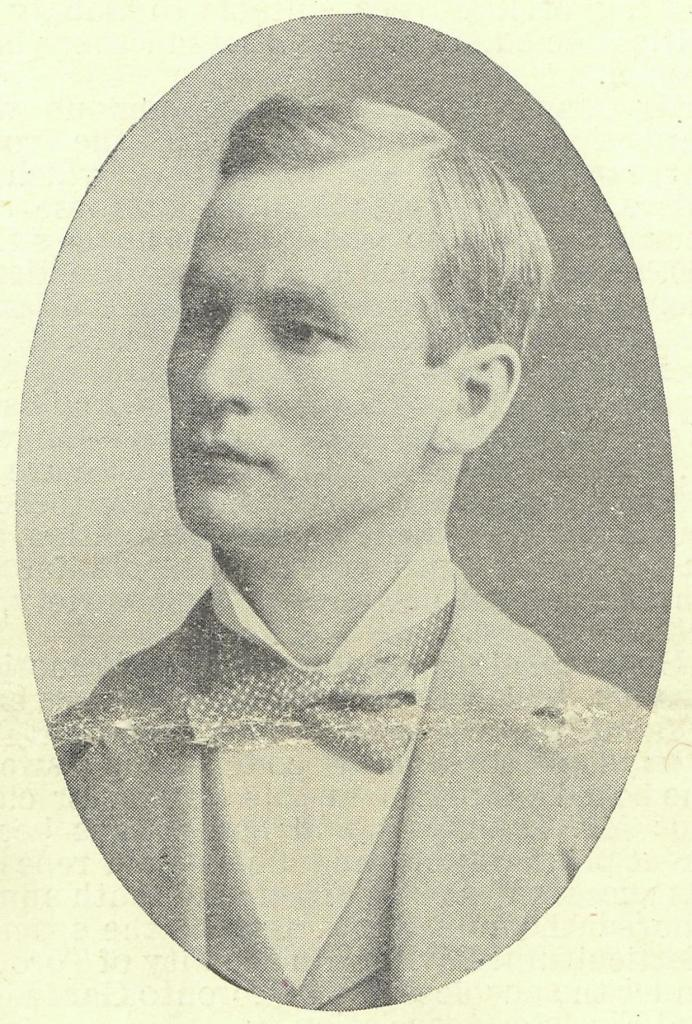
Portrait of Weston in 1899

George Weston was born to Ann and William Weston at Oswego, New York, in 1864. By the time George turned four, the family, British immigrants who first settled in Canada, had returned to Toronto after some time in the United States. On completing public school, George was sent out into the workforce.

== Baking career ==
Young George was apprenticed to C.J. Frogley, a baker with a small shop at 850 Yonge Street, north of Bloor Street, then on the outskirts of Toronto in 1876. After a number of years, Frogley abandoned the location, and another baker by the name of G.H. Bowen eventually set up shop there. After a year or so, Bowen moved the bakery to Sullivan Street, not far from today's Art Gallery of Ontario. George found employment with Bowen, who is said to have taken enough interest to see that he "learned the business the way it should be learned."

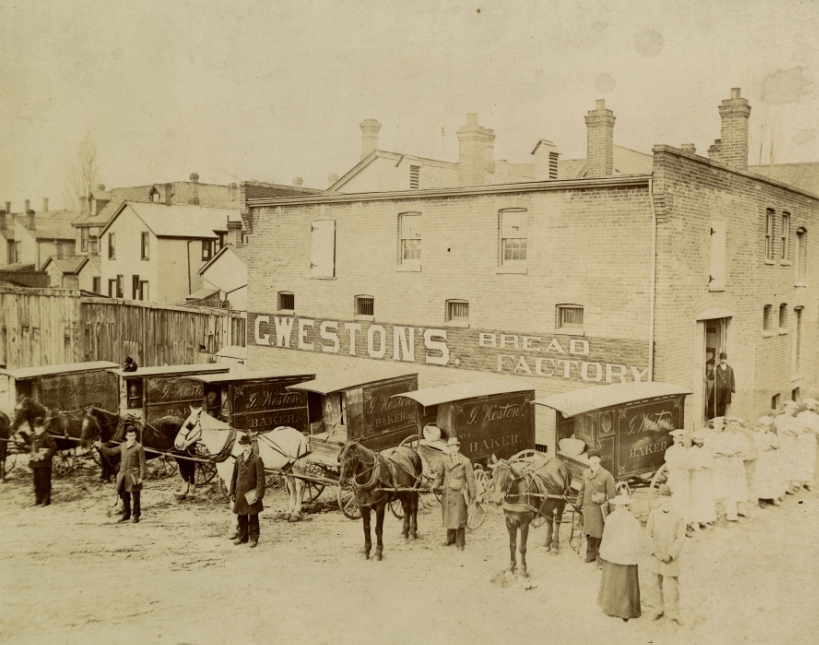
George Weston's first bakery, where he developed his "Real Home-Made Bread", Sullivan Street, Toronto, c. 1895

Eventually, George became a bread salesman, and in 1882, he bought a bread route from Bowen. Two years later, he bought out the bakery of his former employer. Years later, George Weston recalled those early days: "I baked 250 loaves the first day. I delivered them—drove my own waggon—called on every customer myself." It was on Sullivan Street where he developed his "Home-Made Bread". In 1889, the bakery was operated with two bread wagons. By 1894, it had undergone four expansions. He also introduced mechanical mixers in the creation process. By the 1890s, he had renamed his bakery "G. Weston’s Bread Factory".

=== Model Bakery ===
In the fall of 1897, George Weston unveiled his new "Model Bakery" bread factory at the corner of Soho and Phoebe streets in Toronto. The two-story structure had an initial production that averaged 3,200 loaves a day and a capacity of 6,500 loaves. But George Weston began hearing reports from his salesmen that the competition was undercutting his prices, contrary to a local Bakers' Association agreement that set a standard price for bread of 12 cents a loaf. As Weston parted company with his fellow bakers, he lowered his prices for both his route and wholesale customers.

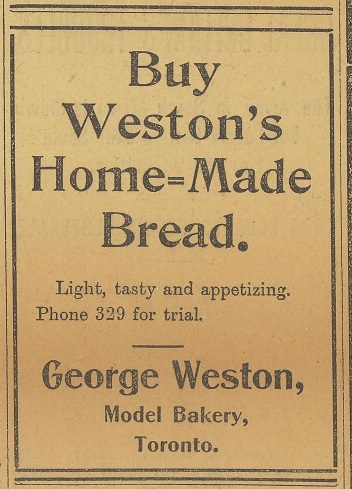
Model Bakery ad for Weston's Home-Made Bread, Toronto World, June 1900

By 1899, in a single month, the Model Bakery delivered 231,650 three-pound loafs, more than double the factory's original output, with bread now shipped to 38 cities and towns outside of Toronto. Two years later, the Model Bakery was supplying over 100 towns across Ontario with its bread, "as far east as Prescott, as far west as Windsor, and up to North Bay."

== Amalgamations ==
In 1901, George Weston merged his operations with those of flour mill owner J.L. Spink of Pickering, Ontario, to form the Model Bakery Company, Limited. In a letter to the editor, Weston addressed rumors concerning a "bread trust" designed to control the bread business of Toronto, saying they were baseless and that the amalgamation was intended to do away with "the middle man's profits" in order to give the public better value for their money.

Model Bakery employees, Spink Mlls, Pickering, Ontario, Pickering News, Christmas Number 1902

After a few years, the mill assets were returned to Spink, and Weston and his business partner went their separate ways. At the first annual Canadian Master Bakers' Association, held September 1902 in Toronto, George Weston delivered the concluding address on the topic of "Bookkeeping methods as applied to the baking trade". Early in the new century, Weston began moving beyond bread into biscuits and sodas.

In 1911, George Weston's bread business underwent another amalgamation with other manufacturers in Toronto, Montreal and Winnipeg to form the Canada Bread Company. In merging their businesses, the Canada Bread partners agreed not to compete with the new company they had created by refraining from making bread for a ten-year period. The Model Bakery became part of the assets of Canada Bread, and George Weston became a company director. Meanwhile, a new "Weston's Biscuit Factory" at the corner of Peter and Richmond streets in Toronto went into production.

== Municipal politics ==
In addition to being a business figure and churchman, George Weston also became a municipal politician, winning election as alderman on Toronto city council. Weston, who in one campaign ad promoted himself as "The Businessman's Candidate", served four successive one-year terms representing Ward Four from 1910 to 1913. He has been described as a "progressive legislator" by the press. In 1914, he returned full-time to his business.

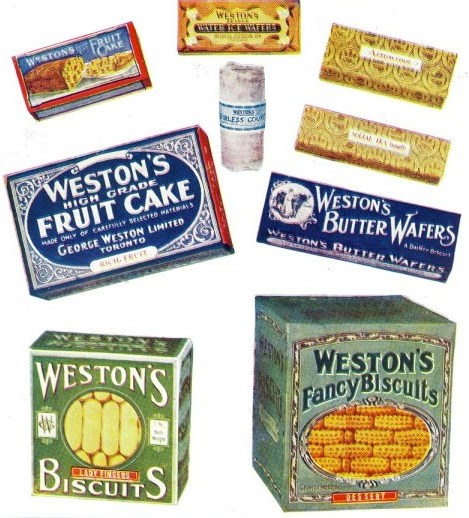
Weston products, company catalogue, George Weston Limited, Toronto, 1920

== World war ==
George Weston Limited struggled through World War I's supply shortages yet remained profitable. The company also supplied biscuits to Canadian troops overseas. One photograph, taken in front of the Weston's Biscuit Factory, showed delivery wagons with banners that read, "For Our Soldier Boys Fighting in France." The eldest son Garfield Weston volunteered for overseas duty as a "Sapper" in the Canadian Expeditionary Force from 1917 to 1919. Garfield toured the British biscuit factories and came away convinced that a similar, high quality product could be successfully manufactured and marketed in Canada.

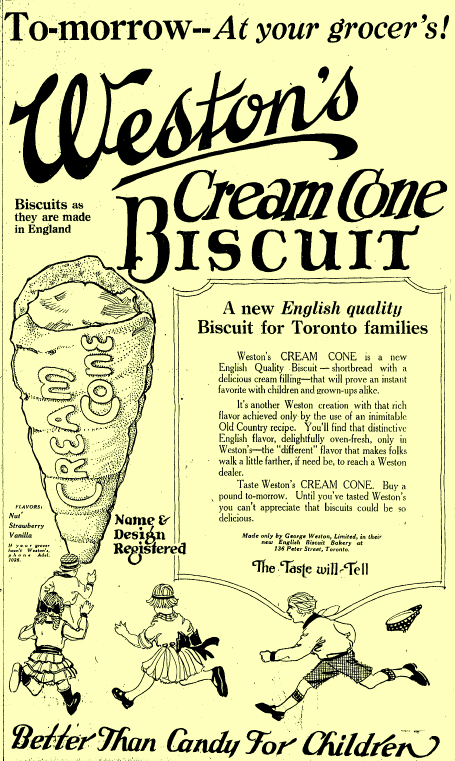
Weston's English Quality Biscuits ad, Toronto Daily Star, December 6, 1922

It was also during this time that George Weston considered selling the company. Distraught over the death of his youngest son in a tragic accident and not sure his eldest son would return from the trenches of France, he received an offer from competitor Christie, Brown and Company to buy George Weston Limited. He wrote to Garfield asking for his advice. Garfield wrote back, asking his father not to sell and telling him to hold on until his return from the war.

=== English Quality Biscuits ===
On his return from war in 1919, Garfield Weston rejoined his father's firm and he soon began taking on managerial responsibilities, first promoted to company vice president and then general manager. In 1921, with the ten-year agreement barring the company from manufacturing bread having expired, George Weston went back to baking bread. It was around this time that Garfield convinced his father to import biscuit ovens and machinery from England. The result was the successful launch of "Weston’s English Quality Biscuits" in 1922. Two months later, the company reported its production line working 24 hours a day, trying to keep up with demand. It soon began adding additional varieties of biscuits to the new line, promoted with the slogan, "Biscuits as They Are Made in England."

== Death ==
George Weston died from a stroke in April 1924, when he was 59.

With the death of George Weston, W. Garfield Weston became president of George Weston Limited. He soon began a program of expansion and acquisition.

In October 2008, the Ontario Heritage Trust unveiled a provincial plaque commemorating George Weston at the site of his former Model Bakery bread factory in Toronto.
