= Travelling Scholarship =

British creative writers' awards

The Travelling Scholarships were established in 1944 to enable British creative writers to keep in touch with their colleagues abroad. As directed by the anonymous founder of the trust, the Scholarships are administered by the Society of Authors and applications are not accepted – recipients are nominated by the assessors for the year. In 2020, each awardee received £1600.

== List of prize winners ==
=== 1940s ===
1946

- C. Day Lewis
- V. S. Pritchett
- William Sansom

1947

- Dylan Thomas

1948

- Julia Strachey
- George Barker

1949

- William Plomer
- Margiad Evans
- Jocelyn Brooke

=== 1950s ===
1950

- David Gascoyne

1951

- Laurie Lee

1952

- Vernon Watkins

1953

- Arthur Calder-Marshall

1954

- Charles Causley
- F.P. Prince

1956

- Maurice Cranston
- Vernon Watkins

1958

- William Golding
- Samuel Selvon

=== 1960s ===
1960

- Michael Swan
- John Whiting

1961

- David Jones

1962

- Frank Tuohy

1963

- R. S. Thomas
- Norman MacCaig

1964

- Christine Brooke-Rose

1965

- Margaret Drabble

1966

- Charles Causley

1967

- George Mackay Brown
- Stevie Smith

1968

- Naomi Lewis

1969

- Peter Vansittart

=== 1970s ===
1970

- Ronald Blythe

1971

- William Trevor

1972

- Norman Nicholson

1973

- Philip Callow

1974

- John McGahern

1975

- Maureen Duffy

1976

- Lettice Cooper
- Gavin Ewart

1977

- Philippa Pullar
- Ted Walker

1978

- Edward Blishen
- Emyr Humphreys

1979

- Jacky Gillott
- Peter Porter

=== 1980s ===
1980

- D. J. Enright
- Fay Weldon

1981

- Douglas Dunn
- Mervyn Jones

1982

- Rosemary Dinnage
- Richard Holmes

1983

- U. A. Fanthorpe
- Hilary Spurling

1984

- Alan Brownjohn
- P. N. Furbank
- Martin Seymour-Smith
- Jackie Kay

1985

- John Griffith Bowen
- Dan Jacobson
- Norman and Jeanne MacKenzie

1986

- Shena Mackay
- Vernon Scannell
- Iain Crichton Smith

1987

- A. L. Barker
- Eva Figes
- Allan Massie
- David Rudkin

1988

- Sybille Bedford
- David Harsent
- Barry Hines
- Nicholas Wollaston

1989

- Roy Heath
- Adrian Mitchell
- Elizabeth North

=== 1990s ===
1990

- David Caute
- Roy Fisher
- David Hughes
- Robert Nye

1991

- Anne Devlin
- Elaine Feinstein
- Iain Sinclair
- Emma Tennant

1992

- Jim Crace
- Donald Davie
- Louis de Bernieres

1993

- Maurice Leitch
- Peter Levi
- Bernard MacLaverty

1994

- Peter Benson
- Jenny Joseph

1995

- Stewart Conn
- Annette Kobak
- Theo Richmond

1996

- William Palmer
- Jo Shapcott
- James Simmons

1997

- Dorothy Nimmo
- Dilys Rose
- Paul Sayer

1999

- Julia Blackburn
- David Hart
- David Mitchell

=== 2000s ===
2000

- Robert Edric
- Georgina Hammick
- Grace Ingoldby
- Walter Perrie

2001

- Alan Judd
- Christina Koning
- Tessa Ransford
- Maurice Riordan

2002

- Frank Kuppner
- David Park
- George Szirtes

2003

- Kate Chisholm
- Jamie McKendrick
- Aonghas Macneacail

2004

- Tim Binding
- Colm Toibin

2005

- Anna Crowe
- Lavinia Greenlaw

2006

- Jenny Diski
- Robert Macfarlane
- Helen Simpson

2007

- Naomi Alderman
- Susan Elderkin
- Philip Marsden

2008

- Marina Lewycka
- Ruth Padel
- Colin Thubron

2009

- Paul Farley
- Eva Hoffman

=== 2010s ===
2010

- Sam North
- Lemn Sissay
- Roma Tearne

2011

- Mark Cocker
- Rose George
- Ben Markovits

2012

- Stella Duffy
- Matthew Hollis
- Justin Marozzi

2013

- Kathleen Jamie
- Olivia Laing
- Elizabeth Cooke
- James Fergusson

2014

- Eimear McBride
- Daljit Nagra
- Michela Wrong

2015

- Tahmima Anam
- James Hall
- Philip Terry
- Rupert Thomson

2016

- Jamie Bartlett
- David Crane
- Peter Oswald
- David Szalay

2017

- Amy Liptrot
- Ross Raisin
- James Sheard

2018

- Jenn Ashworth
- Tash Aw
- Jessie Greengrass
- James Harpur
- Sudhir Hazareesingh

2019

- Kathryn Hughes
- Damian Le Bas
- Nadifa Mohamed
- Johny Pitts
- Gwendoline Riley

=== 2020s ===
2020

- Luke Brown
- Inua Ellams
- Georgina Lawton
- Neil Rollinson
- Ahdaf Soueif

2021

- Clare Pollard
- Guy Gunaratne
- Lola Okolosie
- Tom Stevenson
- Yara Rodrigues Fowler

2022

- Linda Brogan
- Maame Blue
- Dylan Moore
- Ayisha Malik
- Ben Judah
- Alice Albinia
