= The Wages of Men and Women: Should They be Equal? =

1919 book by Beatrice Webb

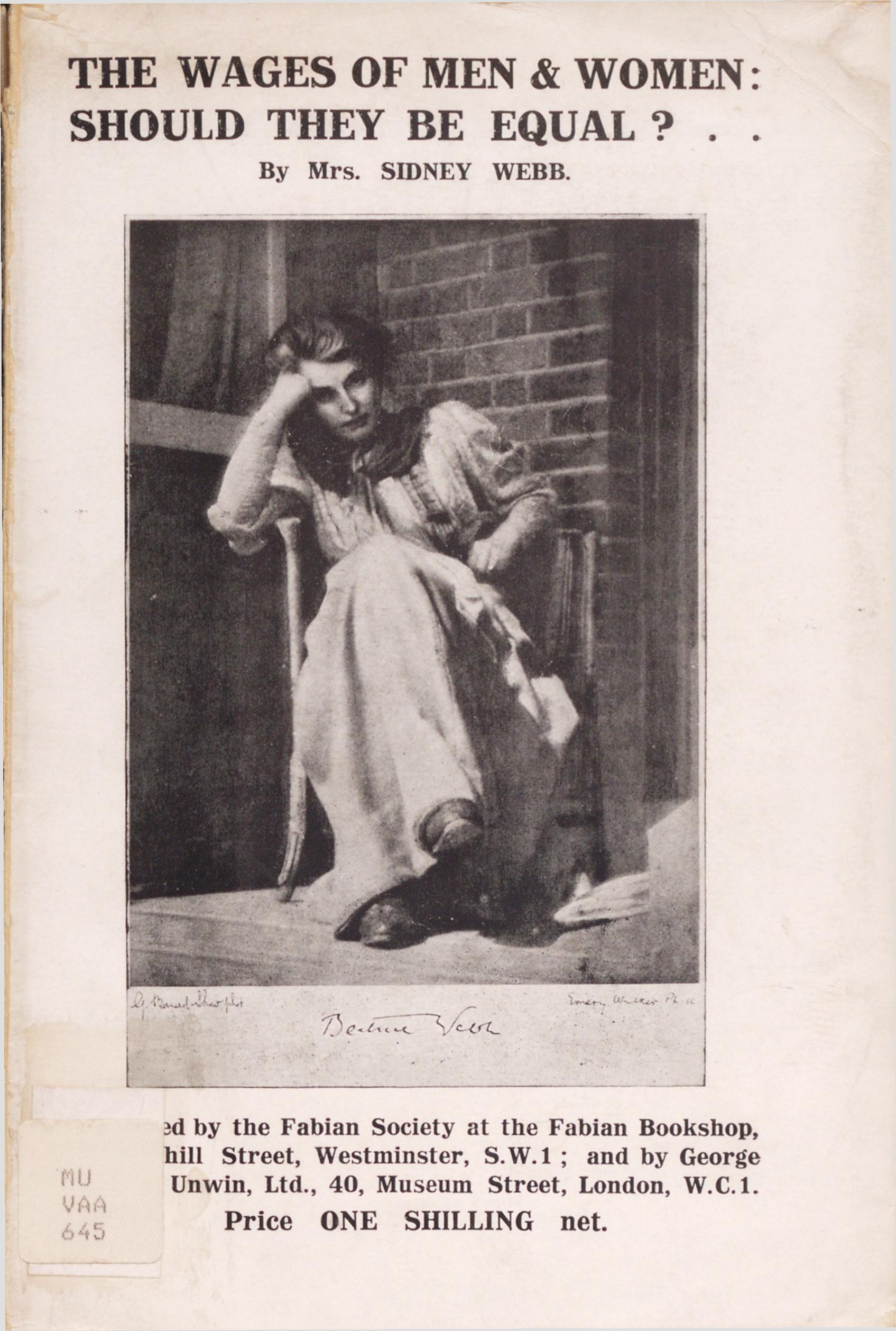
- Title page of the book
- Author: Beatrice Webb
- Language: English
- Subject: Gender pay gap
- Publisher: Fabian Society
- Publication date: 1919
- OCLC: 43587694

The Wages of Men and Women: Should They be Equal? is a book written by English sociologist, economist, socialist and social reformer Beatrice Webb. It deals with equal pay for equal work and the basic principles that should apply to men's and women's wages. First published by the Fabian Society in 1919, the book is a minority report in which Webb criticizes the main purpose and findings of the War Cabinet Committee on Women in Industry. Webb was herself a member of the Committee, which was to investigate whether women who worked in occupations that had been considered men's work before the war were in fact receiving equal pay, and also to establish the principles that would determine the relationship between men's and women's wages.

== Context ==
Beatrice Webb was born in 1858, the daughter of Richard Potter, a successful Victorian lawyer and business investor who supported her emancipatory aspirations. Webb was first confronted with the dire living conditions of working class women when she worked as a volunteer rent collector in the model dwellings arranged by the philanthropic East End Dwellings Company. She gained further direct experience of life in the Victorian slums of London when she worked as a social scientist for her cousin Charles Booth. Webb helped Booth with his survey of working class life in London, which was later published as the book Life and Labour of the People in London.

Beatrice Webb was not primarily committed to feminist issues. She was more dedicated to social improvement and social equality in general than gender equality in particular. Instead of looking at social controversies from a gender perspective, Webb preferred to address social issues in all their complexity.

Before the World War I, Webb was opposed to "equal pay for equal work" because she was convinced that this principle would cause great harm to working class families who depended on men's income. Originally, she was also against women's suffrage and signed a public letter in the journal The Nineteenth Century in 1889 with the title "An Appeal Against Female Suffrage". Webb later stated that she regretted signing this appeal and wrote a letter to Millicent Fawcett in 1906 in which she spoke out in favour of women's suffrage.

Along with socialist and women's rights activist Annie Besant and others, Webb was involved in the founding of the Fabian Women's Group on 14 March 1908, which sought to combine socialism and women's suffrage and advocated equal unemployment benefits for women. Webb headed the Minority Report published in 1909 by the Royal Commission on the Poor Laws and Relief of Distress 1905–1909, to which her husband, Sidney Webb, also contributed. The report, which was one of the Webbs' most famous publications, outlined a welfare state that, according to Beatrice Webb, would "secure a national minimum of civilised life ... open to all alike, of both sexes and all classes, by which we meant sufficient nourishment and training when young, a living wage when able-bodied, treatment when sick, and modest but secure livelihood when disabled or aged."

The UK's entry into the World War I in August 1914 resulted in many women officially entering the labour market for the first time, to replace men who had to leave their jobs to fight. In 1915 Webb signed an appeal as part of the War Emergency Workers' National Committee, directed at women who had taken men's jobs during the war. The appeal urged working women in war industries to join a trade union and demanded that "where a woman is doing the same work as a man she should receive the same rate of pay, and that the principle of equal pay for equal work should be rigidly maintained" and that "in no case should any woman be employed at less than an adequate living wage". In February 1918, some British women over 30 were given the right to vote and in November of the same year the Parliament (Qualification of Women) Act 1918 was passed, enabling women to be elected to the House of Commons.

In 1918, following the implementation of equal pay for women tramway and bus workers who had gone on strike because they were to receive lower war bonuses than their male colleagues, the War Cabinet Committee on Women in Industry was appointed. The committee was to investigate whether the pledge to pay equal wages to women working in place of men, made by the government in 1915 as part of the Treasury Agreement with the Trade Unions, had been kept by the public bodies concerned, and to determine what principles should govern the relationship between men's and women's wages. All six committee members, of whom Webb was the only independent member while the other five were government officials, signed the majority report, but because Webb disagreed with her colleagues' report, she decided to additionally write a minority report.

== Contents ==
=== Structure ===
The book is divided into an introduction, in which Webb briefly describes the context of the report, and three chapters. In the first chapter, she defines and discusses ten principles by which men's and women's wages had hitherto been determined:

1. The principle of individual bargaining
2. The principle of national minimum
3. The principle of collective bargaining and of the occupational rate leading, under existing circumstances, to a male rate and a female rate
4. The principle of adjusting money wages to cost of living
5. The principle of determining wages by family obligations
6. The principle of the vested interest of the male
7. The principle of a definite qualification for employment
8. The formula of equal pay for equal work
9. The principle of limiting wages by foreign competition
10. The device of profit-sharing

In the second chapter, Webb then considers which of these principles should govern wages and which principles should be rejected:

- The principle of individual bargaining must be rejected
- The principle of national minimum must be accepted
- The principle of occupational rate must be accepted
- The principle of male rate and female rate must be rejected
- The principle of adjusting money wages to meet increases in cost of living must be accepted
- The principle of determining wages by family obligations must be rejected
- The principle of the vested interest of the male must be rejected
- The principle, wherever practicable, of a definite qualification for an occupation must be accepted
- The formula of "equal pay for equal work" must be rejected, but only because of its ambiguity
- The device of profit-sharing must be rejected
- The principle of limiting wages by reference to foreign competition must be rejected

Webb notes at this point that she does not consider those four principles, which she does not reject, sufficient on their own to determine wages and recommends the adaptation of another principle, "namely that of a closer correspondence of occupational rates to relative efforts and needs". In the final chapter, she describes some considerations that arise from the proposed principles.

=== Webb's main arguments ===
Webb's report criticises the Committee's one-sided approach, which focused specifically on women's wages, and she emphasises that the correct approach is to examine the principles that govern the wages of both men and women. In contrast to the majority report, she states that "for the production of commodities and services, women no more constitute a class than do persons of a particular creed or race" and that there is no more reason "for occupational or standard rates being made to differ according to the workers sex than according to their race, creed, height or weight".

Webb points out the ambiguity of the term "equal pay for equal work" and the problems associated with it, gives three different meanings of equal pay:

1. Equal pay for equal efforts and sacrifices
2. Equal pay for equal product
3. Equal pay for equal value to the employer

and criticises the majority report for not taking into account the problems arising from the term.

She rejects the argument that the minimum wage for men must be higher than that for women because men have to support their family members with their wages while women have no family responsibilities. Webb calls for a minimum wage that is the same for men and women because, firstly, some women also have children to support with their wages (and often a sick husband who cannot work) and, secondly, wages based on family responsibilities give employers too many opportunities to lower wages unduly. She is convinced that family responsibilities should not be addressed by a higher minimum wage for men, but by "some form of State provision, entirely apart from wages". Webb rejects the principle of determining wages based on family obligations and advocates family allowances on a case-by-case basis, where the state provides direct financial support to families with children.

In her argument, Webb uses examples from feminist literature as well as testimonies before the committee that corroborate these examples.

== Reception ==
=== Reactions ===
In the years following the publication of her book, the problems Webb had pointed out remained and her recommendations were not readily implemented. The campaign for equal pay for women continued.

The English socialist, politician and writer Margaret Cole wrote in 1955 of Webb's book that it "remains a minor classic, its arguments unrefuted". Eleanor Rathbone, a fierce campaigner for family allowances and women's rights, and Mary Hamilton, a writer, civil servant and Labour politician, also praised Webb's work.

=== Equal pay for women in the UK after publication ===
The Second World War led to another massive recruitment of women for positions vacated by the conscription of men for war. Twice as many women were mobilised as in the First World War, and by 1943 46% of all women aged 14–59 (7.25 million women) were employed in industry, the military and civil defence. Although women were now also working in the higher-paid, all-male skilled professions, their wages remained on average 53% of those of the men they substituted for, and they had to work long hours despite their family responsibilities. The so-called dilution agreements, which were agreements between employers' organisations and trade unions allowing the temporary replacement of men by women in predominantly male occupations, generally allowed for the implementation of equal pay for women who replaced men. However, most of these agreements included the reservation that only women who could do the work without assistance or supervision were entitled to equal pay. This proviso and the insistence of many employers that the work done by the women they employed was typical women's work and therefore not covered by the dilution agreements meant that in reality most women did not receive equal pay.

The Equal Pay Act 1970, based on the Equal Pay Act of 1963 in the United States, was passed on 29 May 1970 and stipulated that women and men doing the same or similar work should receive equal pay. The main trigger for the introduction of the law is considered to be the Ford sewing machinists strikes of 1968, in which the seamstresses at Ford Motor Company Limited's Dagenham plant in London stopped work because they were to receive 15% less pay than the men. This strike led to the formation of the National Joint Action Campaign Committee for Women's Equal Rights, which held a demonstration for equal pay in 1969 with 1000 participants. However, the Equal Pay Act 1970 did not take effect until 29 December 1975, giving employers more than five years to reclassify occupations held by women so that the legislation does not apply to them. The legislation was repealed by the Equality Act 2010.

In 2020, the gender pay gap among all employees in the United Kingdom was 15.5% and among full time employees 7.4%. The gender pay gap among full-time employees aged under 40 years was close to zero. This gender pay gap is not a measure of the pay difference between men and women doing the same job, but a measure of the pay difference between men and women across all occupations in the United Kingdom. This measure is not a so-called adjusted pay gap, which means that it does not take into account differences between men and women in terms of working hours, career choice, educational attainment and work experience. It is calculated as the difference between the average hourly earnings of men and women relative to the average hourly earnings of men.

== See also ==
- Feminist economics
- List of feminist economics
- Equal pay for equal work
- Equal Pay Day
- Materialist feminism
- Fabian Society
- List of Fabian Tracts (1844–1915)
- Women's suffrage
- Gender pay gap
- United Kingdom employment equality law
