= Sidney and Beatrice Webb =

Sidney and Beatrice Webb may refer to:

- Sidney Webb, 1st Baron Passfield (1859–1947), English socialist, economist, co-founder of the London School of Economics
- Beatrice Webb (1858–1943), English sociologist, economist, co-founder of the London School of Economics, wife of Sidney Webb
