= Kitty Muggeridge =

British writer and translator

Kathleen Rosalind Muggeridge
- Born: Kathleen Rosalind Dobbs; 8 December 1903; Château d'Oex, Vaud, Switzerland
- Died: 11 June 1994 (aged 90); Welland,Ontario, Canada
- Occupations: Writer, translator
- Spouse: Malcolm Muggeridge (m. 1927; died 1990)
- Children: 4
- Relatives: Beatrice Webb (aunt); Stafford Cripps (cousin)

Kathleen Rosalind Muggeridge (née Dobbs; 8 December 1903 – 11 June 1994) was a British writer and translator.

She was born in Château d'Oex, Vaud, Switzerland, where her parents, the former Rosalind Potter (Beatrice Webb's sister) and George Dobbs, were then living. Stafford Cripps was a cousin. The family returned to England when hostilities in the Great War began. She attended Bedales School and, briefly, in her early 20s, the London School of Economics. In 1927, she married the journalist Malcolm Muggeridge, and the couple eventually had three sons and a daughter.

The Muggeridges were posted to the Soviet Union in 1932 by the Manchester Guardian. Then admiring the Bolsheviks, the couple described it as "a wondrous development" but quickly became completely disillusioned when both saw what was happening in the country. Kitty's aunt, Beatrice Webb, who, with her husband, Sidney Webb, 1st Baron Passfield, had recently defended the Soviet Union in their book Soviet Communism: A New Civilization?, called Muggeridge's Manchester Guardian articles "an hysterical tirade" but was more restrained in her private communications with the couple.

With Ruth Adam, she wrote Beatrice Webb: A Life 1858–1943 (1967), which although more a memoir than a scholarly book, was positively reviewed at the time. Her 1967 remark about the broadcaster David Frost ("he rose without trace") has been much quoted over the years.

Like her husband, she became an admirer of the Calcutta-based nun Mother Teresa, about whom she wrote a book, Bright Legacy (1983), a work published the year after the couple had become Catholics. In that period, she translated two books by Jean Pierre de Caussade, the 18th-century French Jesuit priest.

Following the death of her husband in 1990, Muggeridge lived with her son John and daughter-in-law in Welland, Ontario, Canada, where she died in June 1994.
