= Dilution policies of the British Ministry of Munitions =

WWI downgrading of skilled engineering jobs

During World War I, the United Kingdom faced the Shell Crisis of 1915, resulting in shortages of artillery shells which disrupted British war operations. To overcome those challenges and increase artillery production, the newly created Ministry of Munitions enforced labour dilution policies. With those policies, skilled engineering jobs were broken down and reassigned so that they could be performed by women and less-skilled workers.

== Pre-war labour organization ==
Before the Shell Crisis of 1915, the munition factories were largely dominated by male high skilled engineers and craftsmen. They were trained for years to be able to perform those complex tasks. At the time, there was also union power that negotiated work hours, conditions and pay. It also meant that changing any work practices, like simplifying tasks, would require the union consent. As a result, production of munition was fairly slow and the government was limited in its power to change it.

With the beginning of World War I, the United Kingdom carried out military operations which rapidly highlighted serious shortages of artillery shells at the front. The Shell Crisis of 1915 began. Production inefficiencies made relying on skilled male workers insufficient, the urgent need for more workers and increased output became clear. The press criticized the government for failing to organize production.

In June 1915 the Ministry of Munitions was created, directed by David Lloyd George. Its direct purpose was to centralise and increase shell production and it had the power to negotiate with unions. But while production needed to rise, many skilled men left for the army; leaving factories even more understaffed. Women and semi-skilled or unskilled workers appeared as the solution to keep factories running during the war.

== Implementation of labour dilution ==
The labour dilution policy was introduced after the Shell Crisis by the Ministry of Munitions. It was a direct response to both issues of skilled men leaving for the army and the need to increase artillery output. It consisted of breaking down skilled tasks into simpler ones so they could be performed by semi-skilled or unskilled workers and women. But the existence of unions protected such jobs which meant that the Ministry of Munitions had to coordinate and negotiate with them to make dilution not only legally but also socially acceptable. The unions negotiations resulted in the "Treasury Agreement" which were crucial to allow semi/unskilled workers to perform certain tasks while protecting the status of skilled workers. It included clauses such as the restoration of pre-war practices after the war and supervision by skilled workers.

Concretely to implement this reform in the factories, the Ministry of Munitions created "Dilution Committees", or "Dilution Boards", which were composed of ministry representatives, employers as well as union representatives. They analysed tasks and decided how to simplify them (e.g. shell assembly, filling, machining) which then allowed women and semi-skilled workers to train quickly and achieve them. Factories had to reorganize accordingly.

Skilled men that stayed either had a supervisor role and managed the new workforce, or they had a quality-control role and they ensured that the quality of munitions was maintained despite lower skills levels. Short factory-based training programs enabled women and semi-skilled workers to quickly acquire the skills needed for their newly assigned tasks in munitions production. Women, called “munitionettes”, performed many shortened tasks under difficult working conditions. They faced long hours, strict supervision and exposure to toxic chemicals (such as TNT) which caused the characteristic yellow staining of skin and hair among "munitionettes". Women's wages were typically set well below those of the men they replaced, often at half-rate or less.

The dilution policy and all the changes it brought with it fulfilled its intended objectives. It got factories to maintain operations despite mass conscription of skilled male workers, it increased the output of shells and munitions significantly. In 1917, 76 million of shells were produced, which was more than a 150 times more than in 1914. Union agreements also reduced resistance and strikes, though tensions remained. Poor working conditions and unequal pay led to growing dissatisfaction and occasional strikes, such as Clydeside in 1917 where male engineers and female workers jointly protested against inequities and welfare standards. The Ministry of Munitions attempted to ease those tensions with local consultation and propaganda, where they framed factory work as patriotic service.

== Post-war reversal ==
The Treasury Agreement had a clause that pre-war practices must return after the war. This promise was respected, and after the Armistice in 1918 many skilled workers returned from military services. They had to be reintegrated to factories workforces which meant that the majority of women and unskilled workers were displaced from their roles. By autumn 1919, 750,000 fewer women were employed in industry compared to 1918 peak. Many women lost their jobs or were assigned to lower positions. Factories also had to go back to its pre-war organization where skilled workers had technicals roles with complex tasks. Some simplified tasks introduced during dilution persisted in limited form but overall the original hierarchy was restored. Union authority was reaffirmed and regained control of work practices and wage structures.

Although this fulfilled the Treasury Agreement, it caused debates about women's place in industrial work. Many former “munitionettes” and labour activists argued that the value of their contribution in skilled positions had been proven during the war. These experiences led to a wider movement for economic and political recognition, coinciding with the extension of the franchise to women in 1918. In parallel, unions reaffirmed their control which paved the way for renewed industrial activism in the 1920s. In this way, the reversal of dilution was marked by new social and industrial tensions.

Labour dilution ended as a temporary wartime policy and contributed to the increase of production during a crisis. Dilution is an example of the limits of industry and how the government can intervene to help overcome them. It set a precedent: during World War II the British government used similar ideas (women's mobilization, union's agreement, etc.)

== See also ==
- Munitions of War Act 1915
- Clyde Workers' Committee
