= Industrial Democracy =

Book by Sidney Webb

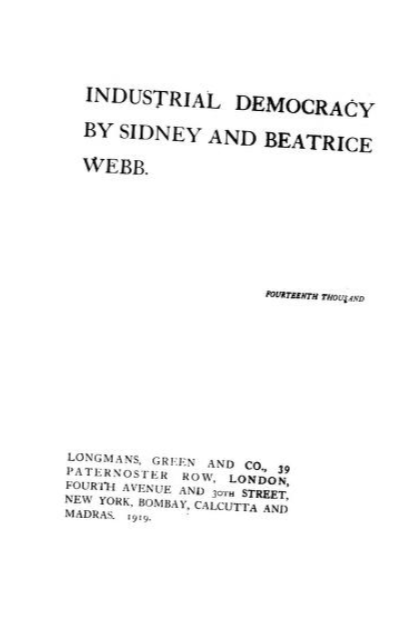
- Title page for Industrial Democracy (1919 edition)
- Author: Sidney Webb, Beatrice Webb
- Publication date: 1897

Industrial Democracy (1st edn 1897; 9th edn 1926) is a book written by British socialist reformers Sidney Webb and Beatrice Webb, concerning the organisation of trade unions and collective bargaining. The book introduced the term industrial democracy to the social sciences, which has since gained a different meaning in modern industrial relations.

Industrial Democracy was published in 1897, three years after the Webbs published History of Trade Unionism, an account of the roots and development of the British trade union movement.

== Contents ==
Industrial Democracy is divided into three parts. The first part concerns the structure of trade unions and concludes that "Trade Unions are democracies; that is to say their internal constitutions are all based on the principle 'government of the people by the people for the people.'" Part II focuses on the function of trade unions and specifically the method of collective bargaining. The third part delves into the theory of trade unions.

=== Part I, Trade union structure ===
Part I explores how unions are representative institutions, and provide the basis of fair governance of the workplace.

=== Part II, Trade union function ===
Part II explores how unions developed systems of mutual insurance for minimum standards and collectively bargained for their members.

=== Part III, Trade union theory ===
Chapter I explains orthodox theories of economists at the time, and their "verdict" against the need for labour regulation. Chapter II sets out a theory of the "Higgling of the Market" where labour has a persistently unequal position. Chapter III explores what trade unions typically do to improve wages and conditions, through a national minimum and collective bargaining.

Chapter IV explores trade unionism and democracy, and looks toward the future of regulation. The imbalance of behaviour between employers and employees was described by the Webbs as follows.

The capitalist is very fond of declaring that labour is a commodity, and the wage contract a bargain of purchase and sale like any other. But he instinctively expects his wage-earners to render him, not only obedience, but also personal deference. If the wage contract is a bargain of purchase and sale like any other, why is the workman expected to tip his hat to his employer, and to say 'sir' to him without reciprocity?

== Significance ==
Industrial Democracy had a profound impact on the British labour movement, and socialism worldwide. It was translated into multiple languages, including a translation into Russian by Vladimir Lenin.

== See also ==
- Trade unionism
- UK labour law
