= Barbara Drake =

Barbara Drake (3 October 1876 – 19 July 1963) was a member of the Fabian Society and trade unionist.

She was born in Knightsbridge, London, the daughter of Daniel Meinertzhagen, a banker, and his wife, Georgina née Potter, sister of Beatrice Webb. In 1900 she married the solicitor Bernard Harpur Drake. They had no children.

Active in the Women's Industrial Council, she conducted an enquiry into the position of the tea-shop girl.

Her 1920 book, Women in Trade Unions was an influential work produced by her under the auspices of the Labour Research Department and the Fabian Women's Group. A co-opted member of the London County Council Education Committee from 1925, she supported educational reforms including the introduction of comprehensive schools. When the Labour Party took control of the county council in 1934, she was made an alderman, holding the seat until 1946.

== Bibliography ==
The following is a non-exhaustive list of the books, booklets, pamphlets and tracts produced by Barbara Drake.

- 1917 Women in the Engineering Trades
- 1920 Women in Trade Unions
- 1922 Some problems of education
- 1924 Staffing in Public Elementary Schools
- 1933 Starvation in the Midst of Plenty
- 1936 Technical Education
- 1937 State Education; an Immediate Programme for a Socialist Government
- 1942 Community Feeding in Wartime

== See also ==
- Beatrice Webb
