= The New Machiavelli =

1911 novel by H. G. Wells

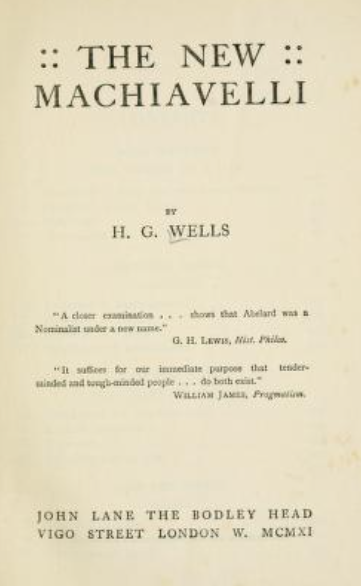
- Title page for The New Machiavelli (1911)
- Author: H. G. Wells
- Language: English
- Genre: Novel
- Published: 1911 (Lane, Bodley Head)
- Publication place: United Kingdom
- Media type: Print
- Pages: 472
- Text: The New Machiavelli at Wikisource

The New Machiavelli is a 1911 novel by H. G. Wells that was serialised in the English Review in 1910. Because its plot notoriously derived from Wells's affair with Amber Reeves and satirised Beatrice and Sidney Webb, it was "the literary scandal of its day."

== Plot summary ==
The New Machiavelli purports to be written in the first person by its protagonist, Richard "Dick" Remington, who has a lifelong passion for "statecraft" and who dreams of recasting the social and political form of the English nation. Remington is a brilliant student at Cambridge, writes several books on political themes, marries an heiress and enters parliament as a Liberal influenced by the socialism of Altiora and Oscar Bailey, a couple easily recognisable as the Webbs, only to go over to the Conservatives. Remington undertakes the editing of an influential political weekly and is returned to parliament on a platform advocating the state endowment of mothers but his career is wrecked by his love affair with a brilliant young Oxford graduate, Isabel Rivers. When rumours of their affair begin to circulate, Remington tries to break it off but then resolves to abandon wife, career, party and country to live in Italy, where he writes the apologia pro vita sua that the novel constitutes.

== Themes ==
The novel's themes are politics and sex, both abiding preoccupations of the author. Biographer David Smith called The New Machiavelli "Wells's most autobiographical novel". The development of political and sexual passion in the protagonist is traced in intricate detail. The artificiality of Victorian and Edwardian morality is the novel's chief target: "Thank God! I'll soon be out of it! The shame of it! The very savages in Australia initiate their children better than the English do to-day. Neither of us was ever given a view of what they call morality that didn't make it show as shabby subservience, as the meanest discretion, an abject submission to unreasonable prohibitions! meek surrender of mind and body to the dictation of pedants and old women and fools. We weren't taught—we were mumbled at!"

== Criticism ==
Vincent Brome wrote that The New Machiavelli was "the beginning of the retreat of Wells the story-teller. ... It was the first ominous eruption of those magnificent moments of self-assertion which were to disintegrate the novelist in him." The novel has had many prestigious admirers, Joseph Conrad called it a "master-work", Upton Sinclair considered it Wells's masterpiece and D. H. Lawrence called it "awfully interesting"; another admirer, Henry James, regarded Wells's use of the first person an artistic mistake.

== Reception ==
Beatrice Webb called The New Machiavelli "very clever in a malicious way" but did not sue, saying that the novel "lays bare the tragedy of H.G.'s life—his aptitude for 'fine thinking' and even 'good feeling' and yet his total incapacity for decent conduct." Some libraries banned the book and the Spectator did not review it. Reviewers were receptive to Wells's political argument but hostile to its sexual message.
