= Jeanne MacKenzie =

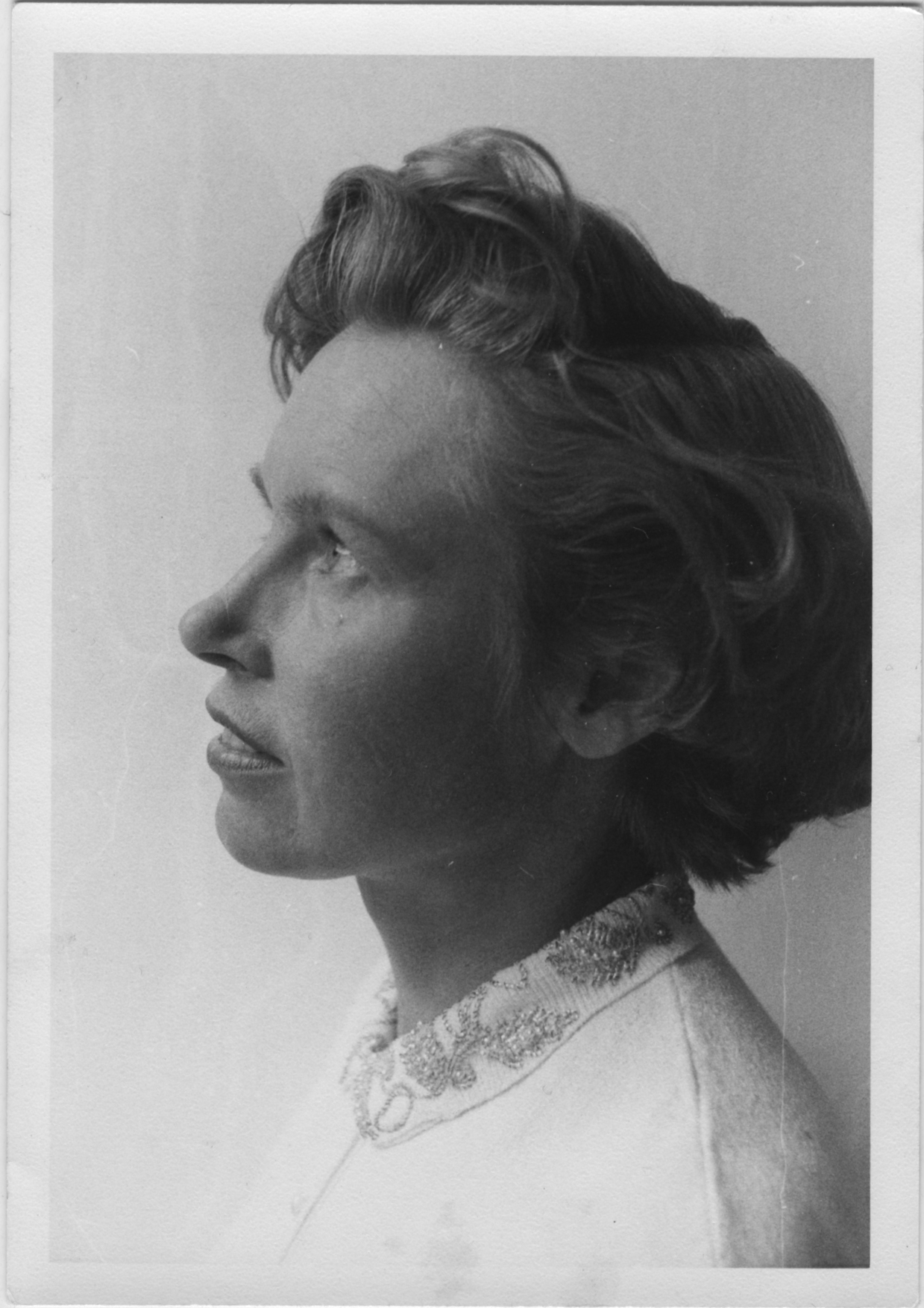
- Jeanne MacKenzie c. 1955
- Born: Daisy Jeanne Sampson; 30 January 1922; St Helens, England
- Died: 16 October 1986 (aged 64); Lewes, East Sussex
- Occupation: Author
- Spouse: Norman MacKenzie (m. 1945)

Daisy Jeanne MacKenzie (known as Jeanne, pronounced Jean, 30 January 1922 – 16 October 1986) was an English author of non-fiction. She was the first wife of the journalist and academic Norman MacKenzie.

== Biography ==
Daisy Jeanne Sampson was born in St Helens, England, on 30 January 1922, the daughter of Leonard Sampson (1894–1977), a leather factor, and his wife, Emily, née Middlehurst (1894–1984). Her elder brother was the academic and peace activist Ronald V. Sampson (1918–1999). She was brought up in the Moss Bank area of St Helens and attended Cowley Girls' School, the local Grammar School. After graduating from the London School of Economics in 1943, she worked as a civil servant during World War II and subsequently as a publisher's reader for Hamish Hamilton and in the 1960s as a counsellor with the Marriage Guidance Council.

She authored several books, both independently and with her husband. One of these was Australian Paradox, recounting a year-long stay in Australia whilst her husband did research for the Social Science Research Council of Australia, the result of which was his important survey Women in Australia (1962). The MacKenzies were known for their work on social reformers Beatrice and Sidney Webb, editing letters and diaries by the couple and writing about them in their collective biography The First Fabians. She compiled a programme for BBC Radio 4 called Dear Mr Webb that was broadcast in February 1977 using the letters to recount the Webbs' courtship. Anna Massey played Beatrice and Clive Swift took the part of Sidney.

She was elected a fellow of the Royal Society of Literature in 1978, together with her husband Norman.

She died of ovarian cancer in 1986. She was survived by her husband and two daughters.

== Books ==
- An Authentic and Faithful History of the Mysterious Murder of Maria Marten (1948) with Norman MacKenzie
- Australian Paradox (1961)
- The Time Traveller: The Life of H. G. Wells (1973) with Norman MacKenzie
- The Diary of Beatrice Webb, 4 vols, edited with Norman MacKenzie: (1982) ISBN 978-0860682097; (1983) ISBN 0860682102; (1984) ISBN 0860682110; (1985) ISBN 0860682129
- The First Fabians (1977) with Norman MacKenzie
- Dickens: A Life (1979) with Norman MacKenzie
- A Victorian Courtship: The Story of Beatrice Potter and Sidney Webb (1979) ISBN 978-0195201666
- Cycling (1981) as editor ISBN 978-0192141170
- The Children of the Souls: A Tragedy of the First World War (1986) ISBN 978-0701128470
