= The Forger (Watkins novel) =

2000 novel by Paul Watkins

- Author: Paul Watkins
- Cover artist: Sarah K. Delson
- Language: English
- Genre: Novel
- Publisher: Picador
- Publication date: 2000
- Publication place: United States
- Media type: Print (Paperback)
- Pages: 322 pp
- ISBN: 978-0-312-27696-6
- Preceded by: The Story of My Disappearance

The Forger is a novel by Paul Watkins about a young American painter who comes to Paris in order to pursue a lifelong dream of the romantic life of a painter in the period prior to World War II. David Halifax, the aspiring artist, has been granted an all-expense-paid trip by a mysterious and unknown benefactor, called the Levasseur Committee, in order to study painting. Unbeknownst to him, the true purpose behind his presence in Paris is part of an intricate plan in order to allow Halifax to reproduce priceless works of art before they are destroyed by the invading Nazi forces.

== Plot summary ==
When David Halifax arrives in Paris in 1939, he finds it a remarkable place, although artists are generally frowned upon and seen as idlers. His classes begin in an atelier, where Halifax is surprised to find only two other students, besides himself, sketching a picture of a nude woman posed on a stool. The teacher, a Russian named Alexander Pankratov, presents himself begrudgingly and carries himself around in an aloof and harshly critical manner yet possesses an unquestioned authority over whomever he meets. The other students introduce themselves, and warn Halifax that Pankratov may be a little deranged because of his eccentricities. The woman on the stool they are sketching is named Valya. She is about the only person who Pankratov seems to allow to do as they please. Later, Halifax learns that Valya is the adopted daughter of Pankratov, who was entrusted with her by his best friend during the Russian Revolution of 1917. Pankratov was an officer in the Tsar Nicholas II's White Army, but did not learn of his defeat until many years later. Valya harbors a deep-rooted dislike for Pankratov, yet displays obedience and praises his artistic genius.

Halifax quickly tires of Pankratov's repeated insistence in sketching every day, and seeks time to complete his own works. He is successful in having Fleury sell some of his sketches, but is alarmed when he learns that Fleury has lied to the buyers, selling his reproductions as originals. While the fraud is forgotten, Halifax adapts well to Parisian life. Strangely, Pankratov has taken a liking in Halifax's sketches, and comments well on them. Balard and Marie-Claire reveal that Pankratov has never commended their work before.

As Halifax falls into the routine of sketching, painting, and dining at the local cafe, there is much talk of the approaching war. He refuses to leave the city, believing that the Germans will never pass the French defense of the Maginot Line. The enemy, however, has maneuvered into the Ardennes Forest, completely bypassing the French line, and quickly pierces into Paris. Pankratov urges Halifax to leave when he still can, but Halifax refuses. One night, he and Fleury are arrested by a policeman named Tombeau on charges of fraud. Tombeau takes them to meet with Pankratov at the police station. Pankratov reveals that he, and the local cafe owner, are the mysterious Levasseur Committee, and that he has brought Halifax to Paris to teach him to forge art. Pankratov reveals that the Germans have burned hundreds of priceless originals during the war so far, and that he and Halifax, with the assistance of Fleury, are to impeccably forge originals, and to trade these to the Germans in return for their original paintings that otherwise would be destroyed. Halifax is shocked, and has no choice but to comply. The Germans arrive, and have seized control of the government.

With them comes Dietrich, a ruthless collector for the Nazi government responsible for stockpiling art. A competitor, the ambassador to Paris named Abetz, is also in the process of acquiring art but for personal use. Halifax and Fluery meet with both men, and for several months trade forgeries for original paintings. Dietrich and Abetz detest each other immensely, and when Dietrich finds that Abetz has acquired a very valuable work, has him killed by Tombeau, who is masquerading as a gangster on the inside working for the Germans.

For the next few years until the end of the war, Halifax and Fleury deal with solely with Dietrich, who has a French appraiser with him to look at the works. The appraiser can somehow see through the forgeries, but because of the frequent and acrid insults Dietrich throws at him, remains silent. On one instance, however, where Dietrich was given a real original painting as part of the plan to keep suspicion at bay, his appraiser tells him that it is a fraud. Dietrich has Halifax and Fleury arrested and taken to a torture chamber, but spares them when they agree to return the paintings that he had traded for the 'fraud'. Halifax feels bitter irony at seeing the only original labeled as a fake.

The war tables start to turn when the Allied Forces invade Normandy. German officers are not as prevalent around Paris, and Dietrich begins to worry. Adolf Hitler has requested a specific original, a Johannes Vermeer painting named The Astronomer. Dietrich agrees to trade sixty originals, with works from such artists as Picasso, for the Astronomer. Halifax and Pankratov forge what was seen as impossible to copy, and deliver the painting on the day that all chaos has broken loose in Paris. Unknown to Halifax, Dietrich killed Fleury because he thought that Halifax had lied. Dietrich runs off with the painting, which never emerged again. He left the keys to a vault in which the sixty originals were hidden. Pankratov finds the only remaining painting that he had created, which was a portrait of Valya as a little girl. He clutches it, but when Tombeau arrives with his gangsters that he had been working with, and tells Halifax and Pankratov to leave the painting and run. The paintings are stolen by the gangsters, and most are never seen again.

The story ends with Halifax returning to the United States after the war, and starting a family when he becomes an art teacher. He stays in touch with Pankratov, who dies some years later. Pankratov's sole surviving masterpiece emerges in an art auction, in which Halifax wins the painting in a bidding war with an unknown party. Halifax assumes that it is Dietrich, who has survived the war.

== Characters ==
- David Halifax – Born in Narragansett, Rhode Island, Halifax is the protagonist and an aspiring artist in Paris during World War II.
- Alexander Pankratov - Born in Russia, Pankratov served in the White Army during the Russian Revolution of 1917. Once renowned for his art, Pankratov has been largely forgotten due to all but one of his works being obliterated in a fire. He teaches Halifax how to forge works of art to match the color, age, and other elements which make up originals.
- Dietrich - Officer of the German Army who seeks original paintings from Halifax and Fleury. He is in competition with the German Ambassador to Paris, who he later has killed. Extremely ruthless and cunning, Dietrich does not stop in his acquisition of paintings, one of which Hitler himself has requested. He is in a love affair with Valya.
- Valya Pankratov - Valya was given to Alexander Pankratov during the revolution since her mother was very sick and immobile, forcing her father to entrust Valya with Alexander once the Bolshevik forces were near.
- Guillaume Fleury - A French art dealer who sells some of Halifax's work. He works with Halifax and Pankratov on the forgeries. Fleury also has an attraction to Valya, but because of his own poor looks, never obtains the courage to make that attraction known to her.
- Tombeau - French policeman who acts as a liaison between Madame Pontier and Halifax. He is a character of dubious morality, as he murders the German ambassador while acting as a gangster working for Dietrich. Although he may have turned on Halifax in the end, he never once puts the lives of Halifax and Pankratov in danger, ensuring their safety throughout the ordeal.
- Madame Pontier - Wealthy French art collector who is part of the project of hiding priceless paintings from the Nazis.
- Artemis Balard - Student of Pankratov who has an affair with Marie-Claire. He is killed in battle after being forcibly drafted.
- Marie-Claire de Boinville - Student of Pankratov who is in love with Balard. She later turns him into the French Army authorities for falsifying his medical records to evade the draft.
- Madame La Roche - Landlady of Halifax and Fleury who dislikes painters, however, she later warms to Halifax when he becomes a long-term resident.
