= English Local Government =

Series of books on UK constitutional and administrative law

English Local Government is a series of nine books written by Sidney Webb and Beatrice Webb between 1903 and 1929 concerning UK constitutional and UK administrative law, relating to public services and local councils.

== Volumes ==
1. "The Parish and The County". English Local Government from the Revolution to the Municipal Corporations Act. Longmans Green & Co. 1906.
2. "The Manor and the Borough, Part One". English Local Government from the Revolution to the Municipal Corporations Act. Longmans Green & Co. 1908.
3. "The Manor and the Borough, Part Two". English Local Government from the Revolution to the Municipal Corporations Act. Longmans Green & Co. 1908.
4. "Statutory Authorities for Special Purposes". English Local Government. Longmans Green & Co. 1922.
5. "The Story of the King's Highway". English Local Government. Longmans Green & Co. 1913.
6. "English Prisons Under Local Government". English Local Government. Longmans Green & Co. 1922. With preface by George Bernard Shaw.
7. "English Poor Law History. Part I: The Old Poor Law". English Local Government. 1927.
8. "English Poor Law History. Part II: The Last Hundred Years, Volume 1". English Local Government. 1929.
9. "English Poor Law History. Part II: The Last Hundred Years, Volume 2". English Local Government. 1929.
10. volumes 10 and 11 were published separately originally but later included in the series: "English Poor Law Policy" and "The History of Liquor Licensing particularly from 1700 to 1830".

== See also ==
- UK labour law
