= David Flusfeder =

American novelist

- Born: David L. Flusfeder; 1960 (age 65–66); Summit, New Jersey, U.S.
- Education: University of Sussex (BA); University of East Anglia (MA)
- Occupations: Author; journalist; playwright; screenwriter
- Children: 2
- Website: davidflusfeder.com

David L. Flusfeder (born 1960) is an American-born British author, journalist, playwright, and screenwriter.

== Early life ==
Flusfeder was born in Summit, New Jersey to Joe Flusfeder, a Polish Jew, and a mother from the East End of London. Born in Warsaw, Joe Flusfeder lived through the early months of the 1939 German occupation of Warsaw. He later spent sixteen months as a prisoner of war, performing slave labour in Siberia from 1940 to 1941. Afterwards, he fought in the Battle of Monte Cassino.

When David was six, his parents separated and he and his sister went to live with their mother in London. Joe remarried, and died in 2008, aged eighty-six. Two years later, David would write a column for The Guardian in remembrance of his father. In the article, he recounts the sudden inspiration for and writing of the novel A Film by Spencer Ludwig, suggesting its deeply autobiographical nature, as it follows a son's visits to a father with whom he has a complex relationship.

== Personal life ==
He was educated at the University of Sussex, where in 1983 he earned his B. A., and the University of East Anglia, from which he received his M. A. in creative writing in 1988. He is currently the director of creative writing at the University of Kent, and has taught the subject at the universities of East Anglia, Brunel, and East London, as well as at Pentonville Prison.

He lives in London with his wife and two children.

== Other work ==
In 2011, Flusfeder became chairman of the Rules Committee of the International Federation of Poker (IFP), from which he resigned in 2013. He has been a poker columnist for The Sunday Telegraph, as well as a television critic for The Times.

He is working on an opera, Army of Lovers, with British pianist and composer Mark Springer.

== Bibliography ==
- Something Might Fall (2026)
- Luck (2022)
- John the Pupil (2014)
- A Film by Spencer Ludwig (2010)
- The Pagan House (2007)
- The Gift (2003)
- Morocco (2000)
- Like Plastic (1996), winner of the Encore Award
- Man Kills Woman (1993)
