= Encore Award =

British literary award

- Sponsored by: Lucy Astor
- Date: 1990; 36 years ago
- Country: United Kingdom
- Presented by: Royal Society of Literature
- Reward: £15,000
- Website: rsliterature.org/award/rsl-encore-award/

The £15,000 Encore Award for the best second novel was first awarded in 1990. It is sponsored by Lucy Astor, presented by the Royal Society of Literature. The award fills a niche in the catalogue of literary prizes by celebrating the achievement of outstanding second novels, often neglected in comparison to the attention given to promising first books. Entry is by publisher.

== List of winners ==
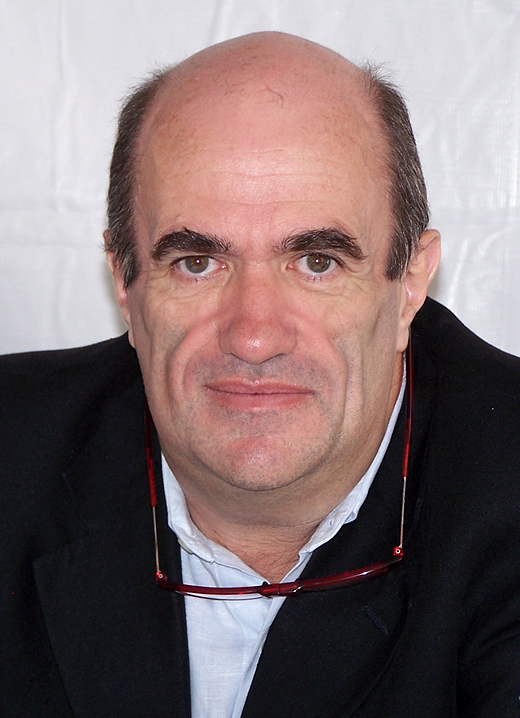
Colm Tóibín won with The Heather Blazing in 1993.

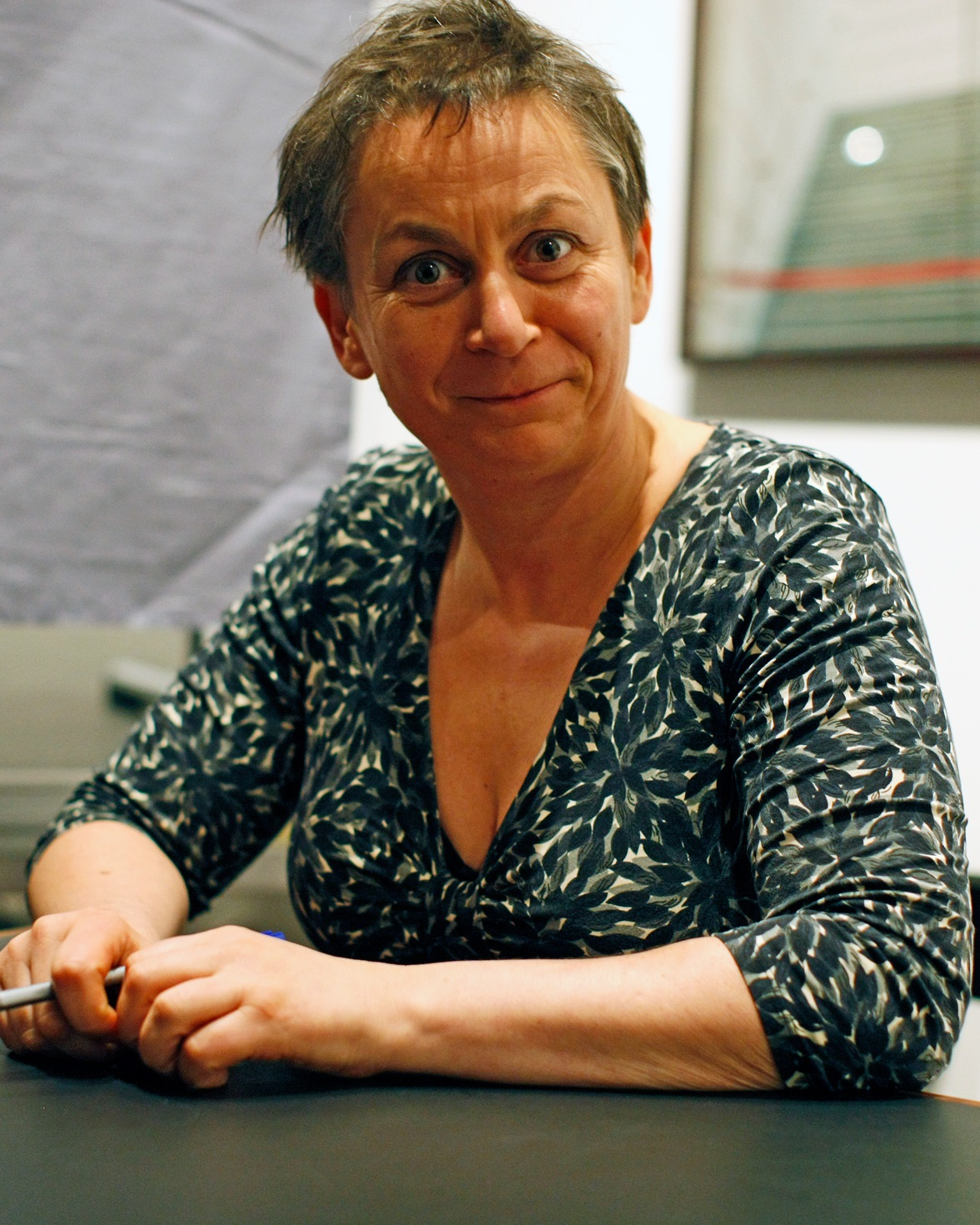
Anne Enright won with What Are You Like? in 2001.

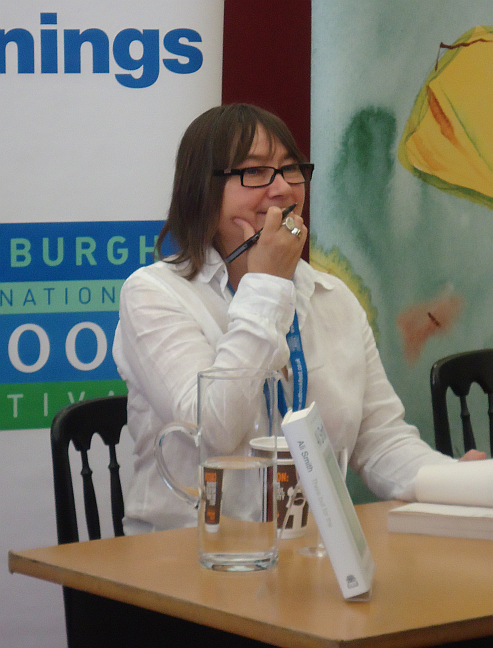
Ali Smith won with Hotel World in 2002.

Year	Author	Book	Award
1990	Peter Benson	A Lesser Dependency	£3,750
1990	Paul Watkins	Calm at Sunset, Calm at Dawn	£3,750
1991	Carey Harrison	Richard's Feet	£7,500
1992	Iain Sinclair	Downriver	£7,500
1993	Colm Tóibín	The Heather Blazing	£7,500
1994	Amit Chaudhuri	Afternoon Raag	£7,500
1995	Dermot Healy	A Goat's Song	£7,500
1996	A. L. Kennedy	So I am Glad	£7,500
1997	David Flusfeder	Like Plastic	£7,500
1998	Timothy O'Grady	I Could Read the Sky	£3,750
1998	Alan Warner	These Demented Lands	£3,750
1999	Christina Koning	Undiscovered Country	£7,500
2000	John Burnside	The Mercy Boys	£2,500
2000	Claire Messud	The Last Life	£2,500
2000	Matt Thorne	Eight Minutes Idle	£2,500
2000	Phil Whitaker	Triangulation	£2,500
2001	Anne Enright	What Are You Like?	£10,000
2002	Ali Smith	Hotel World	£10,000
2003	Jeremy Gavron	The Book of Israel	£10,000
2004	Michelle de Kretser	The Hamilton Case	£10,000
2005	Nadeem Aslam	Maps for Lost Lovers	£10,000
2006/07	M. J. Hyland	Carry Me Down	£10,000
2008/09	Julia Leigh	Disquiet	£10,000
2010/11	Adam Foulds	The Quickening Maze	£10,000
2011	Joe Dunthorne	Wild Abandon	£10,000
2012	Ned Beauman	The Teleportation Accident	£10,000
2013	Evie Wyld	All the Birds, Singing	£10,000
2014	Neel Mukherjee	The Lives of Others	£10,000
2015	Sunjeev Sahota	The Year of the Runaways	£10,000
2017	Ian McGuire	The North Water	£10,000
2018	Andrew Michael Hurley	Devil's Day	£5,000
2018	Lisa McInerney	The Blood Miracles	£5,000
2019	Sally Rooney	Normal People	£10,000
2020	Patrick McGuinness	Throw Me to the Wolves	£10,000
2021	Caoilinn Hughes	The Wild Laughter	£10,000
2022	Francis Spufford	Light Perpetual	£10,000
2023	Daisy Hildyard	Emergency	£10,000
2024	Isabella Hammad	Enter Ghost	£15,000
