= Jessie Holliday =

English painter and suffragette (1884–1915)

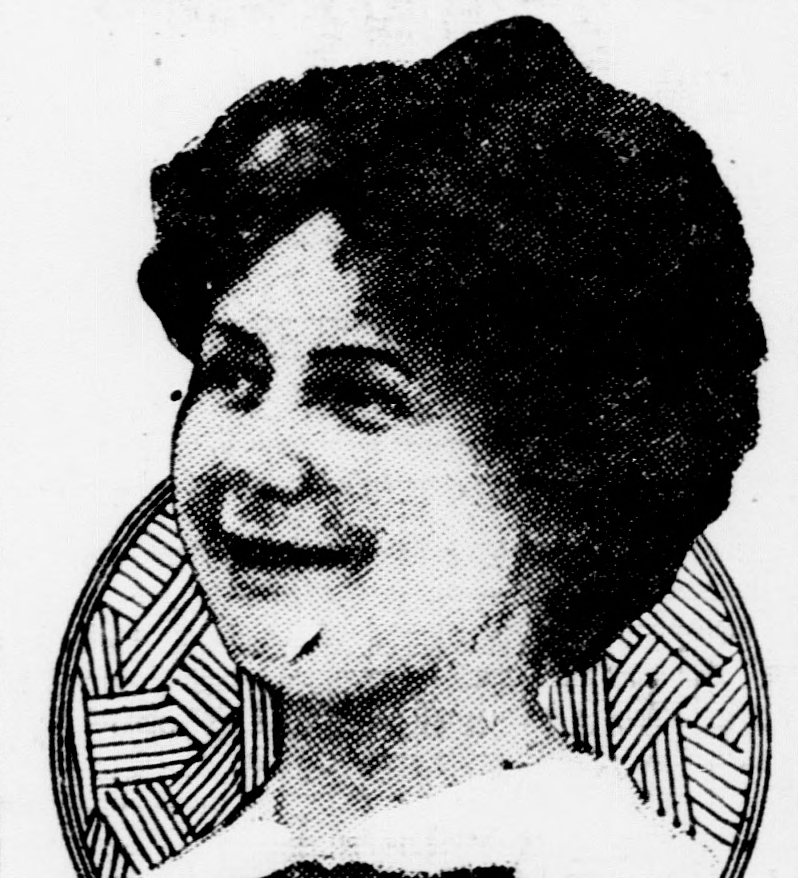

Jessie Holliday (5 February 1884 – 17 June 1915) was an English artist and suffragette.

== Life ==
Holliday's father was Henry Holliday and mother, Eliza Matilda Denman. He was Secretary of the Iron and Steel Company.

Aged thirteen, she went to the Quaker school, Polam Hall, for three years. She then entered the Cope & Nichols school of painting at South Kensington. There, she developed a talent for drawing and painting receiving a silver medal for drawing. From 1903 to 1906, she was at the Royal Academy School of art. She returned to the Royal Academy School between 1906 and 1908 for a second term.

Holliday married Edmund Trowbridge Dana, a grandson of the poet Longfellow, in 1912.

== Artistic career ==
The following year she began to portraiture in earnest, tackling many important socialist figures and leading thinkers. Amongst them were Clifford Allen, Hugh Dalton, Dr Somerville Hastings, the Labour MP for Reading, P.S. Florence, the statistician, and Lady Constance Lytton, the leading militant suffragette. She went on to include as her sitters George Bernard Shaw, Sidney and Beatrice Webb, and Blank Whites.

She became a leading light of the early Summer School Movement at which Fabian intellectuals gathered.

Holliday supported the Food Reform Movement; part of which was her own personal contribution by becoming a vegetarian. At the time of her move to America she was well known as a watercolourist and for her drawings.

== Death ==
Holliday committed suicide by drowning at Cliff Beach, Nantucket on 17 June 1915, aged thirty-one years.
