= Daisy Hildyard =

English novelist, 21st century

- Born: 1984 (age 41–42); Malton, North Yorkshire, England
- Education: St Edmund Hall, Oxford; Queen Mary University of London
- Occupations: Novelist, essayist
- Years active: 2013–present
- Notable work: Hunters in the Snow (2013); The Second Body (2017); Emergency (2023)
- Awards: Somerset Maugham Award; Encore Award

Daisy Hildyard (born 1984) is an English novelist and essayist. Her novels Hunters in the Snow (2013) and Emergency (2023) won the Somerset Maugham Award and the Encore Award respectively.

== Early life ==
Hildyard was born in Malton, North Yorkshire. She gained a first-class degree at St Edmund Hall, Oxford in 2003, and then studied for a doctorate in early modern scientific literature at Queen Mary University of London.

== Career ==
=== Novel writing ===
Hildyard's debut novel, Hunters in the Snow, was published in 2013. Set in rural Yorkshire, it interweaves memories of the narrator's childhood with her deceased grandfather's unreliable historical writings. Reviewers noted the influence of W. G. Sebald. The novel won the 2014 Somerset Maugham Award, given to writers under the age of 35.

In her next novel, Emergency, a narrator in lockdown recalls her semi-rural childhood in the context of global environmental change. It was shortlisted for the Rathbones Folio Prize and won the 2023 Encore Award, given for a second novel.

=== Other activities ===
In 2017, Hildyard's essay collection, The Second Body (2017), was published by Fitzcarraldo Editions. Its four long essays are linked by themes of climate and ecology disruption in the Anthropocene.

In 2022, Hildyard contributed the text to Overpass, a book of photographs exploring stiles and fences in the British countryside by landscape photographer and 2022 Guggenheim Fellow Sam Contis.

Hildyard has also published fiction in The New Yorker, fiction in The Paris Review, essays and fiction in Granta, and reviews in The Guardian, The New York Review of Books and the Times Literary Supplement.

In the spring semester of 2025, Hildyard was a Writer Fellow at the University of Manchester's Centre for New Writing.

She contributed texts to Pink Noise (2025), an exhibition catalogue devoted to the artist collective Troika, and Drawing: Antony Gormley (2026), published by Thames & Hudson.

== Personal life ==
Hildyard is married to writer Caleb Klaces (winner of a 2012 Eric Gregory Award). She lives with her husband and children in North Yorkshire.

== Select publications ==
=== Novels ===
- Hildyard, Daisy (2013). Hunters in the Snow. Jonathan Cape. ISBN 9780224097444.
- Hildyard, Daisy (2023). Emergency. London: Fitzcarraldo Editions. ISBN 9781913097813.

=== Essays ===
- Hildyard, Daisy (2017). The Second Body. London: Fitzcarraldo Editions. ISBN 9781910695470.
