= Gillian Ford =

British medical administrator (born 1934)

Gillian Ford CB FRCP FFPH
- Born: 18 March 1934 (age 92)
- Education: University of Oxford
- Spouse: Norman MacKenzie

Gillian Rachel Ford (born 18 March 1934) is a British retired medical administrator.

== Biography ==
Ford studied medicine at the University of Oxford and St Thomas' Hospital, qualifying in 1959, and then undertook a number of junior medical roles.

She subsequently obtained work with the Department of Health and Social Security, rising to the position of deputy Chief Medical Officer in 1977.

She was Director of Studies at St Christopher's Hospice from 1985 to 1999, where she worked on the development of palliative care and hospice medicine. From 1989 to 1990 she was also Chief Executive at the Standing Committee on Postgraduate Medical and Dental Education, and from 1990 to 1997 she was medical director of Marie Curie Cancer Care.

Following formal retirement, she sat as a member of Ministry of Justice Appeals Tribunals for Incapacity benefit appeals and others.

She maintained her involvement with Christopher's Hospice as a volunteer and trustee, and served as a Privy Council nominee on the General Medical Council.

She was invested as a Companion of the Order of the Bath (CB) in the 1981 New Year Honours, and is a Fellow of the Royal College of Physicians (FRCP) and a Fellow of the Faculty of Public Health Medicine (FFPH).

She married the historian and journalist Norman MacKenzie in 1988. He died in 2013.
