= Peter Benson (author) =

British writer (born 1956)

Peter Benson (born 1956) is the author of novels, plays, short stories and poetry, and has been described by the London Evening Standard as having "one of the most distinctive voices in modern British fiction".

== Career ==
He has won a number of prizes for his work, including the Guardian Fiction Prize, the Encore Award and the Somerset Maugham Award, and was awarded a Society of Authors Travelling Scholarship in 1994.

== Personal life ==
Benson is father to a daughter, Ella (born 1995), by poet Carol Ann Duffy who was in a relationship with novelist and poet Jackie Kay.

== Awards ==
- The Levels – Winner, Guardian Fiction Prize
- The Levels – Winner, Authors' Club Best First Novel Award
- The Levels – Winner, Betty Trask Prize
- The Levels – Shortlisted, Whitbread Book Award
- The Levels – Shortlisted, The Premio Letterario Chianti
- A Lesser Dependency – Winner, Encore Award
- The Other Occupant – Winner, Somerset Maugham Award
- Society of Authors – Awarded, Travelling Scholarship 1994
- Two Cows and a Vanful of Smoke – Selected, Jerwood Fiction Uncovered Prize 2012

== Bibliography ==
=== Novels ===
- 1987, The Levels (Constable, Penguin)
- 1989, A Lesser Dependency (Macmillan, Penguin)
- 1990, The Other Occupant (Macmillan, Penguin)
- 1993, Odo's Hanging (Hodder & Stoughton)
- 1994, Riptide (Hodder & Stoughton)
- 1995, A Private Moon (Hodder & Stoughton)
- 1997, The Shape of Clouds (Hodder & Stoughton)
- 2011, Two Cows and a Vanful of Smoke (Alma Books)
- 2012, Isabel's Skin (Alma Books)
- 2017, The South in Winter (Alma Books)
- 2020, The Stromness Dinner (Seren)
- 2022, Kidnap Fury of the Smoking Lovers (Seren)

=== Plays ===
- 2013, The Two Friends with Alessandro Gallenzi (Calder Publications)

=== Short stories ===
- 1987, Jude: Winter's Tales 3 (Constable)
- 1988, Alan: Winter's Tales 4 (Constable)
- 1988, Rajastan, 1987: 20 Under 35 (Picador)
- 1990, Gates of Swimming: Winter's Tales 6 (Constable)
- 2000, Dominion: New Writing 9 (Vintage)
