= Calm at Sunset, Calm at Dawn =

1989 novel by Paul Watkins

- First edition (US)
- Author: Paul Watkins
- Cover artist: John Howard
- Language: English
- Publisher: Houghton Mifflin (US); Hutchinson (UK)
- Publication date: 1989
- Publication place: United States
- Media type: Print & audio
- Pages: 275
- ISBN: 0-395-50959-9

Calm at Sunset, Calm at Dawn is the second novel by American author Paul Watkins. It was published in 1989 by Houghton Mifflin and shared the Encore Award the following year.

== Plot introduction ==
The story is set on and off the Rhode Island coast where James Pfeiffer, age 20 and just expelled from college, starts working on a broken down scallop trawler against the wishes of his family. He follows in the footsteps of his father Russ, who now has an unexplained fear of the sea. James comes to learn the very real dangers that exist in the present and truth about his father's past.

== Reception ==
- Publishers Weekly said 'Watkins's spare, whittled-down prose does not buoy up the action, but readers will savor the realistic evocations of life at sea and the portrayal of a particular maritime subculture.'
- Kirkus Reviews' opinion was mixed: "There are hardships, deaths, injuries, sweepings-overboard, and near-misses aplenty in the spectacularly described and salty passages at sea--but the plot chugs along like a leaky TV barge', and concludes "Descriptive brilliance laboring through the shoals of the routine."

== Publication history ==
- 1989, US, Houghton Mifflin, ISBN 0-395-50959-9, Pub date Aug 1989, Hardback
- 1989, UK, Hutchinson, ISBN 0-09-173914-4, Pub date Sep 1989, Hardback
- 1990, UK, Vintage, ISBN 0-09-965880-1, Pub date 20 Sep 1990, Paperback
- 1991, US, Avon, ISBN 0-380-71222-9, Pub date Feb 1991, Paperback
- 1991, US, Recorded Books, ISBN 1-55690-084-8, Audio cassette
- 1996, US, Picador, ISBN 0-312-15418-6, Pub date 15 Oct 1996, Paperback
- 1997, UK, Faber & Faber, ISBN 0-571-19001-4, Pub date 06 Jan 1997, Paperback
- 2012, US, Daunt, ISBN 1-907970-08-8, Pub date 01 Jun 2012, Paperback

== Film adaptation ==
The story was adapted for television in 1996 for Hallmark Hall of Fame, entitled just Calm at Sunset. Directed by Daniel Petrie it starred Peter Facinelli as James Pfeiffer, Michael Moriarty as his father Russ, Kate Nelligan as his mother Margaret, Gretchen Mol as his girlfriend Emily and Kevin Conway as Kelly Dobbs. Its music, composed by Ernest Troost, was nominated for a Primetime Emmy Award.
