= Paul Watkins (novelist) =

American author (born 1965)

- Born: January 1, 1964 (age 62)
- Education: Yale University (BA)
- Occupation: Novelist
- Website: www.paulwatkins.com

Paul Watkins (born January 1, 1964) is an American author who currently lives with his wife, Cathy, and two children, Emma and Oliver, in Hightstown, New Jersey. He is a teacher and writer-in-residence at The Peddie School, and formerly taught at Lawrenceville School.

He attended the Dragon School, Oxford, Eton and Yale University. He received a B.A. from Yale and was a University Fellow at Syracuse University. His recollections of his time at the Dragon School and Eton form his autobiographical work Stand Before Your God: An American Schoolboy in England (1993). He wrote his first book, Night Over Day Over Night (1988), when he was 16 years old.

== Fiction ==
- Night Over Day Over Night (1988)
- Calm at Sunset, Calm at Dawn (1989) (won 1990 Encore Award)
- In the Blue Light of African Dreams (1990)
- The Promise of Light (1992)
- Archangel (1995)
- The Story of my Disappearance (1997)
- The Forger (2000)
- Thunder God (2004)
- The Ice Soldier (2005)

== Non-fiction ==
- Stand Before Your God: An American Schoolboy in England (1993)
- The Fellowship of Ghosts: Travels in the Land of Midnight Sun (2006)

== Recent works ==
Recently Watkins has begun writing a series of novels under the pseudonym Sam Eastland. His new detective series is set in Stalinist Russia with Inspector Pekkala as protagonist.

- Eye of the Red Tsar (2010)
- The Red Coffin (UK title) / Shadow Pass (US title) (2011)
- Siberian Red (UK title) / Archive 17 (US title) (2012)
- The Red Moth (2013)
- The Beast in the Red Forest (2014)
- Red Icon (2015)
- Berlin Red (2016)
