= Katharine Buildings =

Buildings in East Smithfield, London, England

Coordinates: 51.5093°N 0.0709°W

Katharine Buildings were model dwellings in Cartwright Street, East Smithfield, London, the first project of the philanthropically-motivated East End Dwellings Company. The block was built during 1884, and opened in 1885 as model apartments for the working class. There were 628 single rooms with shared cooking and sanitary facilities, plus a top floor for the very poorest families. The buildings were named after the philanthropist Catherine Courtney.

A key feature of the Buildings was the rent collection system. Whereas most Model Dwellings Companies employed a strict regimen of prompt rent payment, the EEDC employed female collectors following the successful schemes demonstrated by Octavia Hill. Beatrice Potter was employed as a principal visitor alongside Ella Pycroft, living in the Buildings, and the scheme was assisted by Charles Booth, Samuel Barnett, Eden Paul, the Charity Organisation Society and Osborne Jay.

The Buildings were demolished in the 1970s and replaced with council housing.
