= The History of Trade Unionism =

Book by Sidney and Beatrice Webb

The History of Trade Unionism (1894, new edition 1920) is a book by Sidney and Beatrice Webb on the British trade union movement's development before 1920.

First published in 1894, it is a detailed and influential accounting of the roots and development of the British trade union movement. The research materials collected by the Webbs form the Webb Collection at the London School of Economics.

== Contents ==
- I The origins of trade unionism, 1
- II The Struggle for existence 1799–1825, 64
- III The Revolutionary period 1829–1842, 113
- IV The new spirit and the new model, 1843–1860, 180
- V The junta and their allies, 233
- VI Sectional developments 1863–1885, 299
- VII The old unionism and the new 1875–1890, 358
- VIII The trade union world 1890–1894, 422
- IX Thirty years’ growth 1890–1920, 472
- X The place of trade unionism in the state 1890–1920, 594
- XI Political organisation 1900–1920, 677

== Editions ==
- Webb, Sidney; Webb, Beatrice (1898). History of Trade Unionism. Printed by the authors especially for the Amalgamated Society of Engineers. ASIN: B00085AVQA.
- Webb, Sidney and Beatrice (1919). The History of Trade Unionism, 1666-1920. Self published for the Students of the Workers' Educational Association.
- Webb, Sidney; Webb, Beatrice (1976). History of Trade Unionism. AMS Press. ISBN 0-404-06885-5.
- Webb, Sidney; Webb, Beatrice (2003). History of Trade Unionism. Barnes & Noble Digital. ISBN 0-594-09369-4.
- Webb, Sidney; Webb, Beatrice (2005). David Martin (ed.). Webbs on Industrial Democracy (Archive Collection). Palgrave Macmillan. ISBN 1-4039-1745-0.

== See also ==
- United Kingdom labour law
