= East End Dwellings Company =

- Company type: Public Company
- Industry: Housing
- Founded: Whitechapel, London, United Kingdom (1882)
- Founder: Samuel Barnett
- Headquarters: London
- Area served: London Borough of Tower Hamlets
- Key people: Samuel Barnett, Beatrice Potter (estate manager), Ella Pycroft (estate manager), Eden Paul
- Products: Model dwellings

The East End Dwellings Company was a Victorian philanthropic model dwellings company, operating in the East End of London in the latter part of the nineteenth century. The company was founded in principle in 1882 by, among others, Samuel Augustus Barnett, vicar of St Jude's Church, Whitechapel; it was finally incorporated in 1884.

It aimed to "house the very poor while realizing some profit", "their particular purpose being to erect blocks of dwellings, to be let by the room, so that the poorest class of laborers could be accommodated". Unlike many of the model dwellings companies, the EEDC offered accommodation to the casual poor and day laborers.

The company's first venture was Katharine Buildings in Wapping, followed by several schemes in Bethnal Green. They went on to build around the East End. Along the principles of Octavia Hill's schemes, the company used female rent collectors, including Beatrice Potter (later Webb), one of the founders of the London School of Economics & Political Science and Ella Pycroft, who ran the Buildings alongside Eden Paul.

== Buildings ==
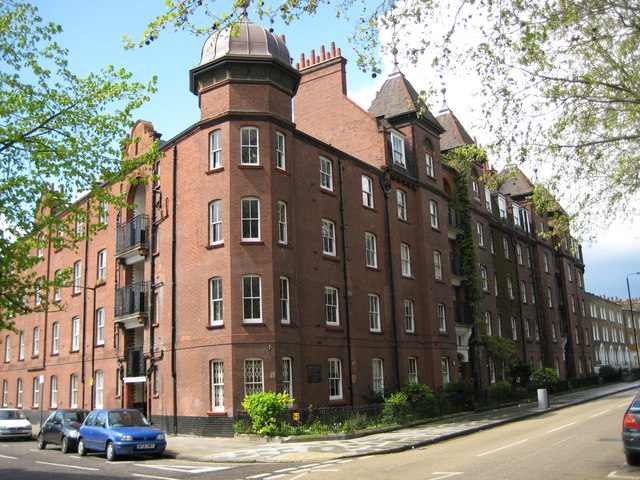
Dunstan Houses, Stepney Green, London E1, built by the East End Dwellings Company in 1899

- Katharine Buildings - Cartwright Street, Aldgate
- Museum House - Green Street, Bethnal Green (1888)
- Tankerton Street, King's Cross (1892)
- Meadows Dwellings - Mansford Street (1894)
- Cressy Houses - Stepney Green (1894)
- Ravenscroft Dwellings - Columbia Road (1897)
- Dunstan Houses - Stepney Green (1899)
- Whidborne Buildings - Tonbridge Street, Kings Cross (1890s)
- Mendip Houses - Kirkwall Place, Bethnal Green (1900)
- Shepton Houses (1900)
- Merceron Houses (1901)
- Montfort House (1901)
- Gretton Houses (1901)
- Thornhill Houses - Barnsbury (1902)
- Evesham House - Old Ford (1905)
- Globe Road/Cyprus Street block - Bethnal Green (1906)

== See also ==
- List of existing model dwellings
