= Anna Crowe =

British poet and translator (born 1945)

- Born: 1945 (age 80–81); Plymouth, England
- Education: University of St. Andrews
- Occupations: Poet, translator

Anna Crowe is a British poet and translator. She has published three poetry pamphlets and three poetry collections. Crowe is a trained linguist and translator of primarily Catalan and Castilian poetry. She has contributed to anthologies of Catalan poets and has translated her own poetry into Catalan.

== Biography ==
Anna Crowe was born in Devonport, Plymouth, England in 1945. She grew up in Sussex and in France. She studied French and Spanish at the University of St. Andrews, where she earned an MA.

She was named winner of the Peterloo Open Poetry Competition in 1993 and 1997. She was one of twenty winners of the Scottish Poetry Library's Best Scottish Poem of the Year in 2004 and 2010. In 2011, Crowe won the Callum Macdonald Memorial Scottish pamphlet poetry Award for Figure in a Landscape. She has translated the works of a number of Catalan, Spanish and Spanish speaking poets, including Josep Lluís Aguiló and Mexican poet, Pedro Serrano (poet).

She was a co-founder of St. Anza, Scotland's Poetry Festival, and served as Artistic Director for the festival's first seven years. Crowe has lived in St. Andrews, Fife since 1986, where she currently teaches creative writing.

== Selected publications ==
- Finding My Grandparents in the Peloponnese (2013)
- Figures in a Landscape and Catalan translation Paisatge amb figura (2011)
- Punk with Dulcimer (2005)
- Secret History of Rhubarb (2004)
- Skating out of the House (1997)

== Translations ==
- Joan Margarit, Love is a Place (2016)
- Josep Lluís Aguiló, Lunarium (2016)
- Six Catalan Poets (2013)
- Joan Margarit, Strangely Happy (2011)
- Joan Margarit, Tugs in the Fog (2006)
