= Christina Koning =

- Born: Kuala Belait, Brunei
- Education: Girton College, Cambridge, University of Edinburgh
- Occupation: Writer
- Employer: The Times
- Awards: Encore Award 1999
- Website: https://www.allisonandbusby.com/authors/christina-koning/

Christina Koning (born 1954) is a British novelist, journalist and academic.

== Life ==
Koning was born in Kuala Belait, Borneo in 1954, and spent her early childhood in Venezuela and Jamaica. After coming to England, she was educated at Girton College, Cambridge and the University of Edinburgh – the setting for her first novel.

She has worked extensively as a travel writer and literary critic – notably as Books Editor for The Times and Cosmopolitan, and on BBC Radio 4's Woman's Hour - and was a judge for the Society of Authors' McKitterick Prize for three years.

As an academic, she has taught Creative Writing at the University of Oxford and University of London, and was the 2014-15 Royal Literary Fund Fellow at Newnham College, Cambridge. She has taught at Cambridge University's Institute of Continuing Education at Madingley Hall and was Editor of Collected, the Royal Literary Fund's magazine.

Koning's first novel, A Mild Suicide (Lime Tree, 1992) is set in Edinburgh in 1977 and was short-listed for the David Higham Prize for Fiction. Her second novel Undiscovered Country (Penguin, 1997) won the Encore Award and contended for the Orange Prize for Fiction. That novel explores aspects of colonialism, an awareness from her early childhood in Venezuela. Fabulous Time (Viking, 2000) is another novel with colonial themes and is partly set in China during the Xinhai Revolution (1911 revolution). It won the Society of Authors Travelling Scholarship. The Anglo-Zulu War in South Africa (1879) is the setting for her work The Dark Tower (Arbuthnot, 2010).

Recent novels include Variable Stars (Arbuthnot, 2011), about the 18th-century astronomer Caroline Herschel and Line of Sight (Arbuthnot, 2014), the first in a series of detective stories set during the 1920s in the aftermath of the First World War. Game of Chance (Arbuthnot, 2015), set in 1929, continues the Blind Detective series, and is followed by Time of Flight (Arbuthnot, 2016), Out of Shot (Arbuthnot, 2017), End of Term (Arbuthnot, 2018), and Murder in Berlin (Allison & Busby, 2023).

Koning has two children, and lives in Cambridge.

== Bibliography ==
=== Novels ===
- A Mild Suicide (1992)
- Undiscovered Country (1998)
- Fabulous Time (2001)
- The Dark Tower (2010)
- Variable Stars (2011)
- Line of Sight (2014)
- Game of Chance (2015)
- Time of Flight (2016)
- Out of Shot (2017)
- End of Term (2018)

=== Blind Detective series ===
- 1. The Blind Detective (2023)
- 2. Murder in Regent's Park (2023)
- 3. Murder at Hendon Aerodrome (2023)
- 4. Murder in Berlin (2023)
- 5. Murder in Cambridge (2023)
- 6. Murder in Barcelona (2023)
- 7. Murder in Dublin (2023)
- 8. Murder at Bletchley Park (2023)
- 9. Murder in Oxford (2025)
- 10. Murder in Paris (2025)
