= Norman MacKenzie (journalist) =

British writer, journalist and educationalist (1921–2013)

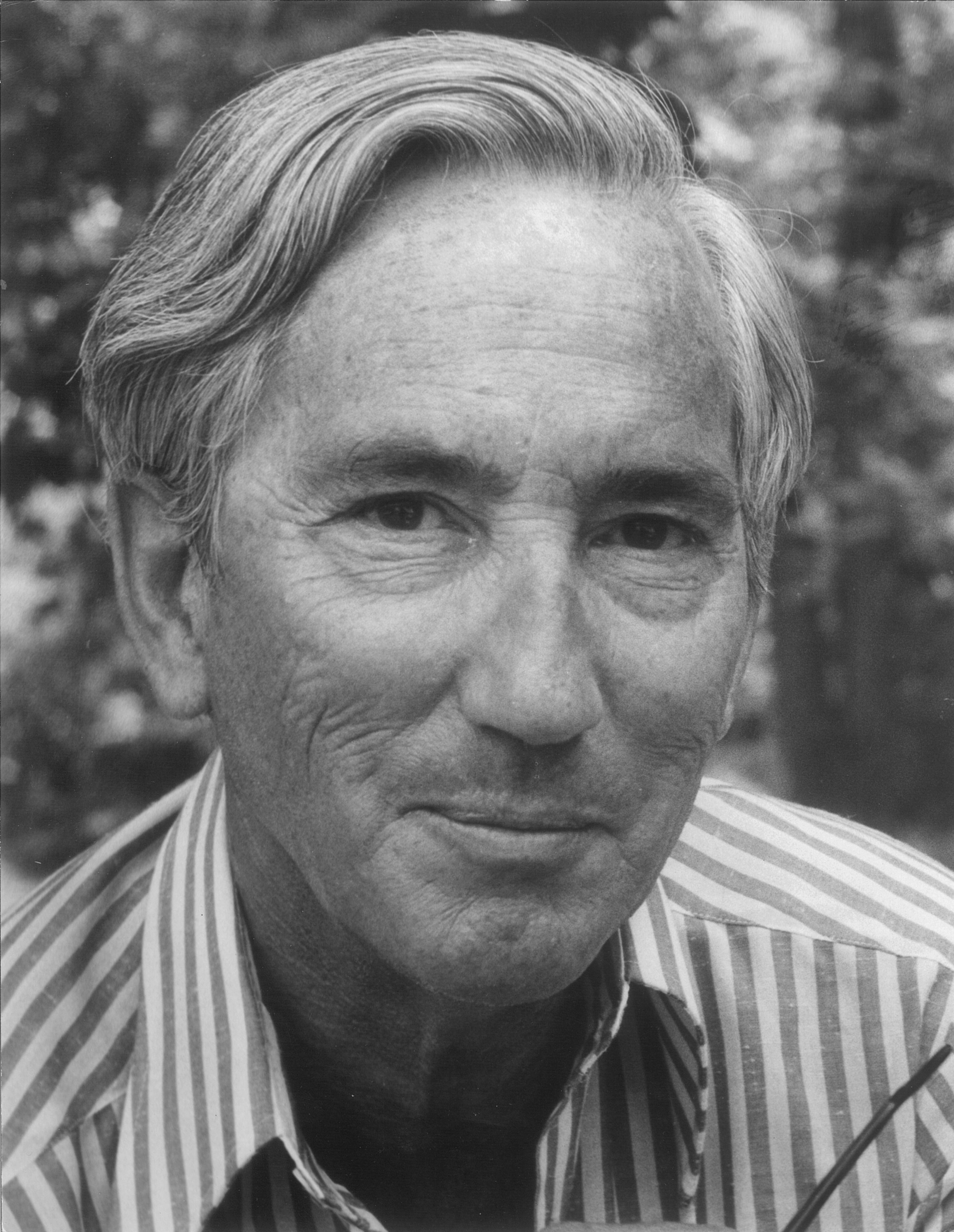
- Norman MacKenzie c. 1980
- Born: 18 August 1921; Deptford, London, England
- Died: 18 June 2013 (aged 91); Lewes, England
- Occupations: Journalist; Academic; Historian
- Spouse(s): Jeanne MacKenzie (m. 1945; died 1986), Gillian Ford (m. 1988)
- Children: 2 daughters (by first marriage)
- Writing career
- Genre: Biographies

Norman Ian MacKenzie (18 August 1921 – 18 June 2013) was a British journalist, academic and historian who helped in the founding of the Open University (OU) in the late 1960s.

== Early years ==
MacKenzie was born in New Cross, south-east London in 1921, the son of Thomas Butson MacKenzie (1881–1962), a credit draper, and his wife, Alice Marguerita, née Williamson (1884–1957). He attended Haberdashers' Aske's Hatcham Boys' School, the local Grammar School.

In 1939, MacKenzie won a Leverhulme scholarship to the London School of Economics (LSE), graduating with a first-class honours degree in government. At LSE he impressed Harold Laski, the Professor of Political Science and a Labour Party activist. It was whilst a student that he joined the Independent Labour Party and briefly the Communist Party of Great Britain, but quickly became dismayed at their eagerness to place members into the armed Forces and public services.

In 1940, while a student at LSE, MacKenzie volunteered for part-time military service in the Home Guard (during World War II). He trained in guerrilla warfare at Osterley Park in west London and was a member of group that then went to Sussex and were to perform behind-the-lines sabotage and guerrilla activity in the event of a German invasion. He was also a member of the Political Warfare Executive that broadcast propaganda via radio to Germany. In 1942 MacKenzie was called up for service in the RAF, interrupting his studies at the LSE, but after four months he was invalided out of the RAF due to a stomach ulcer.

== Career ==
Alter leaving the LSE in 1943, MacKenzie spent the next 19 years until 1962 as an assistant editor with the New Statesman magazine, specialising in sociology and communism. MacKenzie made frequent trips behind the Iron Curtain throughout the 1950s and possibly worked for MI6 gathering intelligence. On a visit to Bulgaria in 1955 he got a tip-off that Soviet premier Nikita Khrushchev was going to denounce Stalin but his report was not believed until the speech was actually given some months later, in February 1956.

He was twice unsuccessful at elections as the Labour candidate for Hemel Hempstead in 1951 and 1955. In 1957 he was involved in the formation of the Campaign for Nuclear Disarmament (CND).

MacKenzie was invited by the Social Science Research Council of Australia to spend the year 1959–60 in Australia, based at the Australian National University in Canberra, to undertake research that resulted in the pioneering study Women in Australia (1962).

In 1962, Asa Briggs recruited him to teach sociology at the University of Sussex. Whilst there he set up the Centre for Educational Technology in 1967, becoming Professor of Education in 1977 and director of the School of Education. In the mid-1960s he worked with Richmond Postgate of the BBC and the then education minister Jennie Lee to work on ideas about getting more people into university. He subsequently became a member of a planning committee and council that created the Open University. MacKenzie remained a council member of the Open University until 1976. He was awarded an Honorary Doctorate (D.Univ) by the Open University in 1977. He was also an Honorary Fellow of the LSE.

MacKenzie taught as a visiting professor at Sarah Lawrence College on a Rockefeller fellowship, 1947–48, Williams College, 1963–64 and 1984–85, and Dartmouth College, 1983, in the US.

MacKenzie was an adviser to Shirley Williams, the Labour Secretary of State for Education and Science from 1976 to 1979, and in 1981 was a signatory of the Limehouse Declaration which led to the foundation of the Social Democratic Party (SDP), which Williams co-founded. MacKenzie was an early member of the SDP, but had no organisational role in the party.

He retired from teaching at the University of Sussex in 1983 as an emeritus professor.

== Orwell's list ==
In 1949 the author George Orwell included MacKenzie on a list of probable communist sympathisers that he prepared for the British Foreign Office. The list was of those considered unsuitable for the preparation of anti-communist propaganda, not those suspected of espionage. After the list was made public in 2002, MacKenzie commented:

Tubercular people often could get very strange towards the end. I'm an Orwell man, I agreed with him on the Soviet Union, but he went partly ga-ga I think. He let his dislike of the New Statesman crowd, of what he saw as leftish, dilettante, sentimental socialists who covered up for the Popular Front in Spain [after it became communist-controlled] get the better of him.

== Books ==
MacKenzie wrote a number of books, with his first wife, Jeanne Sampson, including well-received biographies of H. G. Wells (1973) and Charles Dickens (1979) and they edited (4 volumes) the diaries of Beatrice Webb (1982–1985). He also edited (3 volumes) the letters of Sidney and Beatrice Webb (1978), and wrote and edited books on a number of other subjects. He co-authored three novels set during the Napoleonic Wars with the ITN television newsreader Antony Brown (born 1922), under the joint pseudonym 'Anthony Forrest'. He was elected a fellow of the Royal Society of Literature in 1978, together with his wife Jeanne.

== Later life ==
Following the death of his first wife Jeanne of cancer in 1986, in 1988 MacKenzie married Dr. Gillian Ford (born 1934), a government medical officer. They lived in Lewes, East Sussex. MacKenzie was a fine painter of watercolour landscapes. He was survived by Gillian and by a daughter from his first marriage.
