= Beatrice Webb =

English sociologist, economist, feminist and social reformer (1858–1943)

The Right Honourable The Lady Passfield FBA
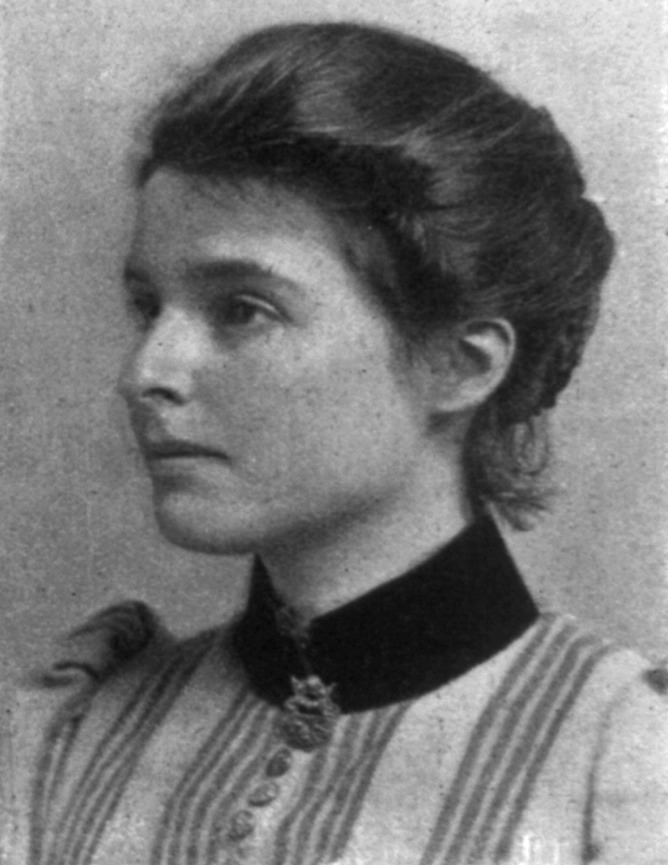
- Portrait of Webb, 1894
- Born: Martha Beatrice Potter; 22 January 1858; Gloucestershire, England
- Died: 30 April 1943 (aged 85); Liphook, Hampshire, England
- Occupations: Sociologist, economist
- Spouse: Sidney Webb (m. 1892)
- Parent(s): Richard Potter; Laurencina Heyworth
- Family: Catherine Courtney (sister); Sir Stafford Cripps (nephew); Barbara Drake (niece); Kitty Muggeridge (niece)

Martha Beatrice Webb, Baroness Passfield (née Potter; 22 January 1858 – 30 April 1943) was an English sociologist, economist, feminist, socialist thinker and social reformer. She was among the founders of the London School of Economics and played a crucial role in forming the Fabian Society. Additionally, she authored several popular books, with her most notable being The Co-operative Movement in Great Britain and Industrial Democracy, co-authored by her husband Sidney Webb, 1st Baron Passfield, where she coined the term "collective bargaining" as a way to discuss the negotiation process between an employer and a labor union. As a feminist and social reformer, she criticised the exclusion of women from various occupations as well as campaigning for the unionisation of female workers, pushing for legislation that allowed for better hours and conditions.

== Early life ==
Beatrice Webb (née Potter) was born in Standish House in the village of Standish, Gloucestershire. She was the youngest of nine daughters of Laurencina Heyworth, the daughter of a Liverpool merchant; and businessman Richard Potter. Laurencina was friends for a time with the prolific Victorian novelist Margaret Oliphant during the 1840s. Both women were campaigning in Liverpool at the time (see Margaret Oliphant, Autobiography, edited by Elizabeth Jay, pages 25–26). Her paternal grandfather was Liberal Party MP Richard Potter, co-founder of the Little Circle, which was key in creating the Reform Act 1832.

Webb faced tragedy with her sisters: one, Blanche, died by suicide in 1905 in her own house; her oldest sister, Lallie, then died due to overdose the next year in 1906. It was believed at the time that both incidents were caused by their marital relationships. Yet, Webb struggled with this idea because of her beliefs of gender roles and equalities:

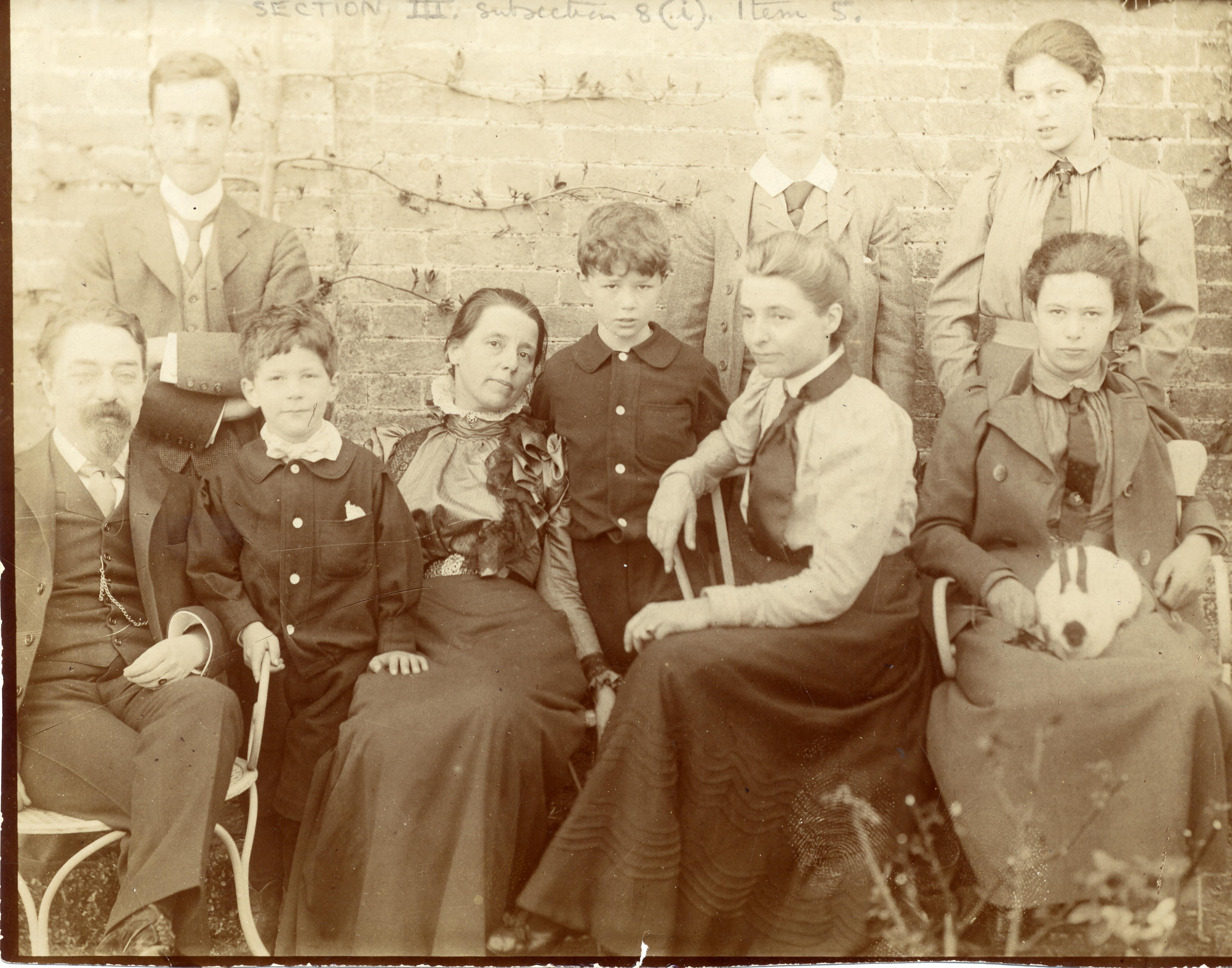
Sidney (left, seated) and Beatrice Webb (second right, seated) with Beatrice's sister Margaret Hobhouse, née Potter, (third left, seated) and Margaret's family; circa 1900

Webb freely acknowledged male mental superiority and agreed with Spencer that women's education needed, above all, to include instruction in household duties. She believed that a woman needed definite home duties to fulfill and someone to be dependent on her love and care.

From an early age Webb was self-taught and cited as important influences the cooperative movement and the philosopher Herbert Spencer. After her mother's death in 1882 she acted as a hostess and companion for her father. In 1882, she began a relationship with twice-widowed Radical politician Joseph Chamberlain, by then a Cabinet minister in William Gladstone's second government. He would not accept her need for independence as a woman and after four years of "storm and stress" their relationship failed.

Marriage in 1892 to Sidney Webb established a lifelong "partnership" of shared causes. At the beginning of 1901, Webb wrote that she and Sidney were "still on our honeymoon and every year makes our relationship more tender and complete."

She and her husband were friends with the philosopher Bertrand Russell.

== My Creed and My Craft ==
Webb left an unfinished autobiography, under the general title My Creed and My Craft. At her death, aged 85, the only autobiographical work she had published was My Apprenticeship (1926). The posthumously issued Our Partnership (1948) covered the first two decades of her marriage to Sidney Webb between 1892 and 1911 and their collaboration on a variety of public issues.

In the preface to the second work, its editors refer to Webb's:

desire to describe truthfully her lifelong pursuit of a living philosophy, her changes of outlook and ideas, her growing distrust of benevolent philanthropy as a means of redeeming 'poor suffering humanity' and her leaving of the field of abstract economic theory for the then practically unexplored paths of scientific social research.

In 1926, when Webb had begun to prepare the second volume, Our Partnership, only to be repeatedly distracted by other more pressing commitments, the book's editors report her finding it difficult to express "her philosophy of life, her belief in the scientific method, but its purpose guided always by religious emotion."

== A pioneer in social research and policymaking ==
One of Beatrice's older sisters, Catherine, became a well-known social worker. After Catherine married Leonard Courtney, Beatrice took over her work as a voluntary rent-collector in the model dwellings at Katharine Buildings, Wapping, operated by the East End Dwellings Company.

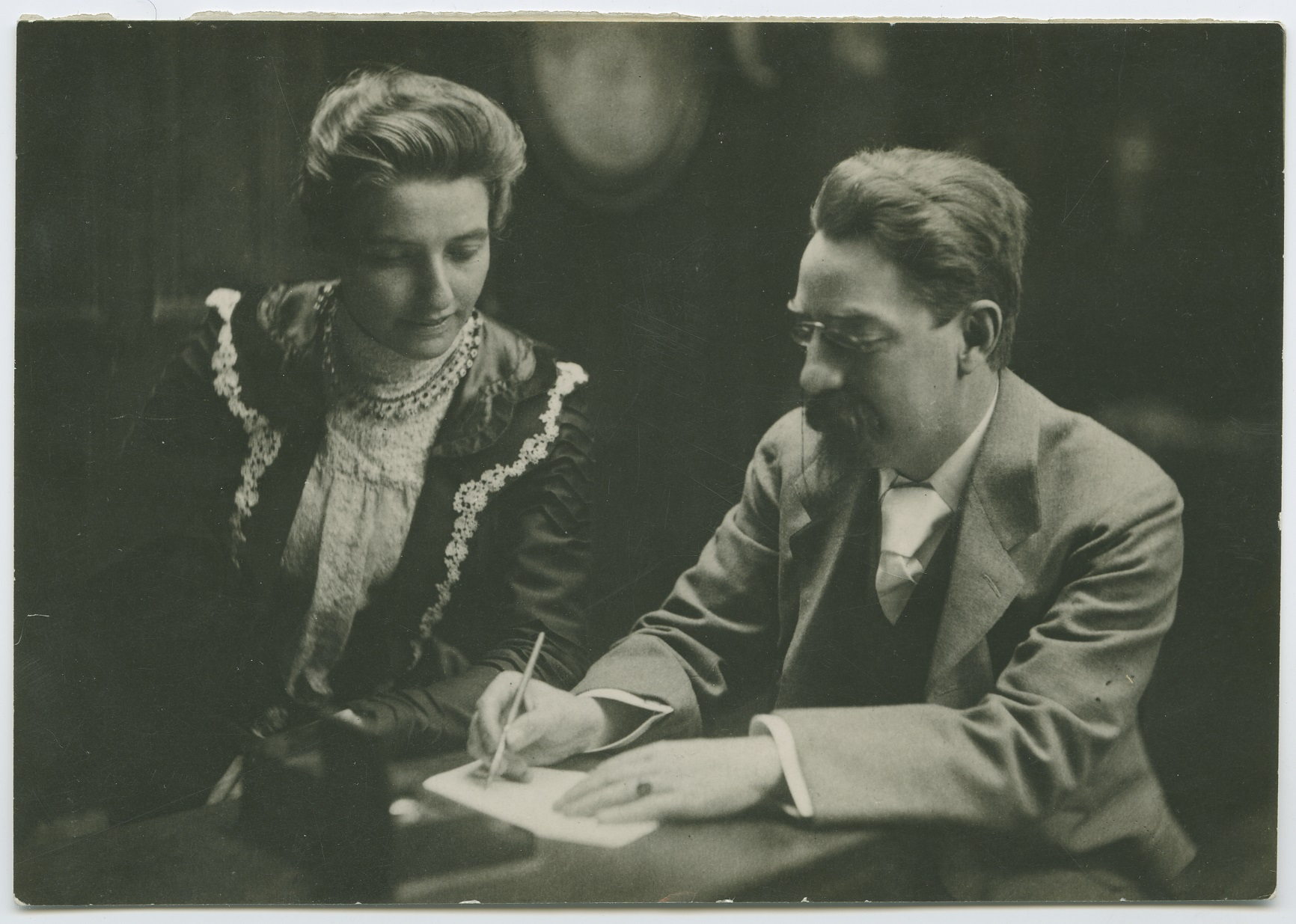
Beatrice and Sidney Webb working together in 1895

The young Beatrice also assisted her cousin by marriage Charles Booth in his pioneering survey of the Victorian slums of London, work which eventually became the massive 17-volume Life and Labour of the People of London (1902–1903).

These experiences stimulated a critical attitude to current ideas of philanthropy.

In 1890, Beatrice Potter was introduced to Sidney Webb, whose help she sought with her research. They married in 1892, and until her death 51 years later shared political and professional activities. When her father died in January 1892, leaving Potter an endowment of £1,000 a year, she had a private income for life with which to support herself and the research projects she pursued.

The Webbs became active members of the Fabian Society. With the Fabians' support, Beatrice Webb co-authored books and pamphlets on socialism and the co-operative movement including The History of Trade Unionism (1894) and Industrial Democracy (1897). In 1895, the Fabians used part of an unexpected legacy of £10,000 from Henry Hutchinson, a solicitor from Derby, to create the London School of Economics and Political Science. Beatrice Webb also became one of the founding members of the Fabian Women's Group in 1908. As a member of the Fabian Women's group, she helped push for equal pay and supported the role of women in local government.

=== Contributions to the theory of the co-operative movement ===
Beatrice Webb made a number of important contributions to the political and economic theory of the co-operative movement.

In her 1891 book The Cooperative Movement in Great Britain, based on her experiences in Lancashire, she distinguished between "co-operative federalism" and "co-operative individualism". She identified herself as a co-operative federalist, a school of thought which advocates consumer co-operative societies. She argued that consumers' co-operatives should be set up as co-operative wholesale societies (by forming co-operatives in which all members are co-operatives, the best historical example being the English Co-operative Wholesale Society) and that these federal co-operatives should then acquire farms or factories.

Webb dismissed the idea of worker co-operatives where the people who did the work and benefited from it had some control over how it was organised, arguing that – at the time she was writing – such ventures had proved largely unsuccessful, at least in ushering in her form of socialism led by volunteer committees of people like herself. Examples of successful worker cooperatives did of course exist, then as now. In some professions they were the norm. However, Webb's final book, The Truth About Soviet Russia (1942), celebrated central planning.

She also is credited with introducing the concept of "collective bargaining." "Collective bargaining" defines the process in which unions discuss with their employers the conditions, hours, pay, and safety of their work environment.

=== 1909 Minority report to the Royal Commission ===
For four years Beatrice Webb was a member of the Royal Commission on the Poor Laws and Relief of Distress 1905-09. The Conservative government of A. J. Balfour established the commission, which issued its final report to the Liberal government of H. H. Asquith. Beatrice was the lead author of the dissenting minority report. This sketched the outlines of a Welfare State which would:

...secure a national minimum of civilised life ... open to all alike, of both sexes and all classes, by which we meant sufficient nourishment and training when young, a living wage when able-bodied, treatment when sick, and modest but secure livelihood when disabled or aged.

With the minority report, she advocated for more aid towards those who were disabled and supported the use of outside relief for infants in workhouses, which often were in poor condition and unsafe. The Minority Report emphasized proper medical care and child-well as provisions needed to the Poor Law. William Beveridge, future author of the 1942 Beveridge Report that introduced the welfare state in the United Kingdom, worked as a researcher for the Webbs on the Minority Report. He was later appointed director (1919–1937) of the London School of Economics.

=== Rivalries on the Left, 1901–1922 ===
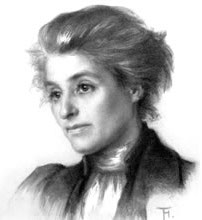
Chalk drawing of Beatrice Webb by Jessie Holiday, circa 1909

The influence of the Webbs on the Fabian Society and its policies was attacked by H. G. Wells. For a time, he joined the Society but was critical of its cautious approach: "They permeate English society with their reputed Socialism about as much as a mouse may be said to permeate a cat." For her part, Beatrice voiced disapproval of Wells' "sordid intrigue" with the feminist Amber Reeves, the daughter of a veteran Fabian Maud Pember Reeves. Wells responded by lampooning the couple in his 1911 novel The New Machiavelli as Altiora and Oscar Bailey, a pair of short-sighted, bourgeois manipulators.

Other rivals from the left of the Fabian Society at that time were the Guild Socialists led by the historian and economist G.D.H. Cole. Cole and his wife Margaret would later run the Fabian Research Bureau.

In 1913, the Webbs and Henry Devenish Harben, husband of suffragist and fellow Fabian, Agnes Harben, co-founded the New Statesman, a political weekly edited by Clifford Sharp with contributions from many philosophers, economists, and politicians of the day, including George Bernard Shaw and John Maynard Keynes.

The Webbs became members of the Labour Party in late 1914. At the end of World War I, Beatrice collaborated with her husband Sidney in his writings and policy statements such as Labour and the New Social Order (1918). She also campaigned for his successful election in 1922 to the parliamentary seat of coastal Seaham, a mine-working community in County Durham.

== Soviet Communism ==
In 1928, the Webbs moved to Liphook in Hampshire, where they lived until their deaths in the 1940s. Soon Sidney was a minister in the new Labour government. Observing the wider world, Beatrice wrote of "Russian communism and Italian Fascism" as "two sides of the worship of force and the practice of cruel intolerance" and she was disturbed that "this spirit is creeping into the USA and even ... into Great Britain."

The frustrations and disappointments of the next few years – the election of a narrow Labour majority of MPs in May 1929, the Great Depression which began later that year, the agreement of fellow Fabian Ramsay MacDonald, after the October 1931 election, to form and head a National Government, thereby splitting the Labour Party – partly explain why Beatrice and Sidney began to look on the USSR and its leader Stalin with different eyes.

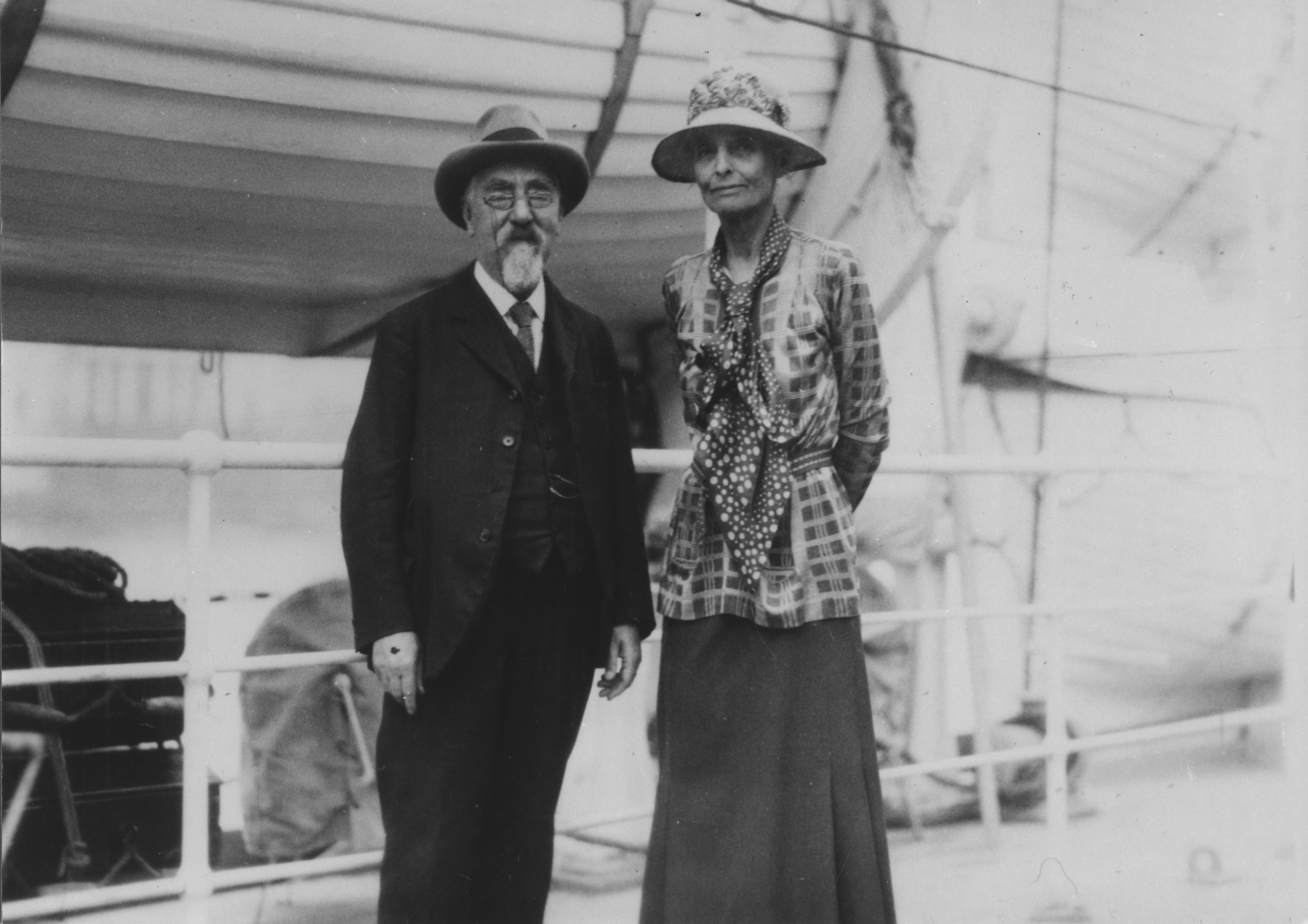
Beatrice and Sidney Webb during their trip to the Soviet Union in 1932

In 1932, Webb was elected a Fellow of the British Academy (FBA); she was the first woman elected to the fellowship. That year, Sidney and Beatrice, now in their 70s, spent two months from 21 May to late July in the Soviet Union. Their views about the Soviet economic experiment were published three years later in a massive volume, over 1,000 pages in length, entitled Soviet Communism: A New Civilisation? (1935). Most of the text was written by Sidney Webb and based on a copious study of publications and statistics provided by the Soviet embassy in London. In 1933 he made a further "fact-finding" trip to the USSR before publication, accompanied by their niece Barbara Drake, a prominent trade unionist and member of the Fabian Society, and by John Cripps, the son of their nephew Stafford Cripps.

Historians have criticised the Webbs for her supposition that the methods they had developed in analysing and formulating social policy in Britain could be applied to the Soviet Union. Their book promoted and encouraged an uncritical view of Stalin's conduct, during agrarian centralisation in the first five-year plan (1928–1933), the creation of the gulag system, and the extensive purges of the 1930s. Trotskyist historian Al Richardson later described their 1935 account of the USSR as "pure Soviet propaganda at its most mendacious".

According to Archie Brown, there also seemed to be an element of deliberate deception. In the third edition of Soviet Communism: A New Civilisation (1941), for instance, the Webbs voiced the opinion that in 1937 "strenuous efforts had been made, both in the trade union organisation and in the Communist Party, to cut out the deadwood". This phrase was used to reassure a wider public about the damning accusations against former leading Bolsheviks. In her diaries, Beatrice expressed her disquiet at the opening of the Moscow Trials in the summer of 1936, and after the conviction of Nikolai Bukharin in March 1938.

Soviet Communism: A New Civilization? – in later editions the question mark was dropped, as was any public doubt the Webbs might have about the nature of the USSR – has since been roundly condemned. In the preface to an anthology of Left Book Club publications, for instance, British historian A. J. P. Taylor is quoted as calling Soviet Communism: A New Civilization "the most preposterous book ever written about Russia". In the early 1930s Malcolm Muggeridge, one of Beatrice's own family by marriage, and himself the son of a Fabian, told her in no uncertain terms of his horrified disapproval of the Soviet system.

She was among those listed in the German-compiled "Black Book".

Ivan Maisky, the Soviet Union's ambassador to the United Kingdom during much of World War II, was friendly with Webb. In a conversation with Webb on 10 October 1939, Maisky quoted her as saying "Churchill is not a true Englishman, you know. He has Negro blood. You can tell even from his appearance."

== Extended family ==
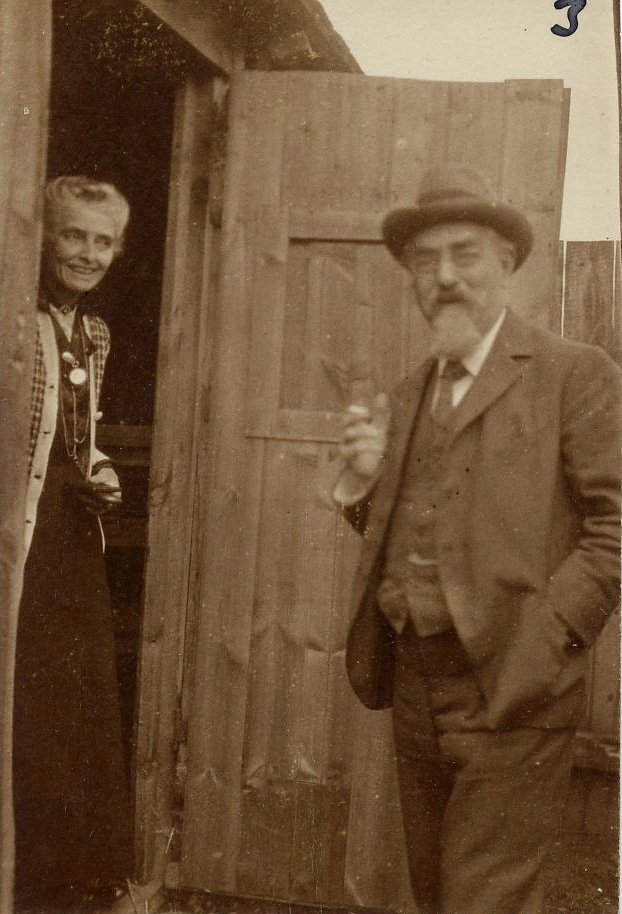
Beatrice and Sidney Webb at Passfield, c. 1923

In 1929 Webb's husband, Sidney Webb, became Baron Passfield and a member of the House of Lords. Between 1929 and 1931 he served as Secretary of State for the Colonies and Secretary of State for the Dominions in Ramsay MacDonald's Labour government. Beatrice did not refer to herself as Lady Passfield or expect others to do so.

Sidney and Beatrice Webb never had any children. In retirement, Beatrice would reflect on the success of their other progeny. For instance, in 1895 they had founded the London School of Economics with Graham Wallas and George Bernard Shaw:

In old age it is one of the minor satisfactions of life to watch the success of your children, literal children or symbolic. The London School of Economics is undoubtedly our most famous one, but the New Statesman is also creditable—it is the most successful of the general weeklies, actually making a profit on its 25,000 readers, and has absorbed two of its rivals, The Nation and the Week-End Review.

Meanwhile, the connections by marriage of their numerous nieces and nephews made Beatrice and Sidney part of the emerging new Labour establishment. Beatrice's nephew Sir Stafford Cripps, son of her sister Theresa, became a well-known Labour politician in the 1930s and 1940s. He served as British ambassador to Moscow during the Second World War and later as Chancellor of the Exchequer under Clement Attlee. Margaret, yet another Potter sister, married the Liberal politician Henry Hobhouse, making Beatrice Webb an aunt of peace activist Stephen Henry Hobhouse and of Liberal politician Arthur Hobhouse. Another sister, Blanche, married surgeon William Harrison Cripps, brother to Theresa's husband Charles Cripps, 1st Baron Parmoor.

A dissonant voice entered the family after Katherine Dobbs, the daughter of Beatrice's youngest sister Rosalind, married the journalist Malcolm Muggeridge. In the early 1930s, the young couple moved to Moscow, full of enthusiasm for the new Soviet system. Muggeridge's experience of reporting from the Soviet Union for the Manchester Guardian, however, made him highly critical of the Webbs' optimistic views of the Soviet Union. On 29 March 1933 Beatrice referred in her diary to "Malcolm's curiously hysterical denunciation of the USSR and all its works in a letter to me...." The following day she noted that The Manchester Guardian had printed "another account of the famine in Russia, which certainly bears out Malcolm's reports."

Yet, wrote Muggeridge, Beatrice "went on wanting to see Kitty and me." On their last visit, Beatrice showed her niece's husband a portrait of Lenin: "She had set the picture up as though it were a Velazquez, with special lighting coming from below."

== Death and legacy ==
When Beatrice Webb died in 1943, she was cremated at Woking Crematorium. The casket containing her ashes was buried in the garden of their house in Passfield Corner, as she had requested. Lord Passfield's ashes were also buried there when he died four years later.

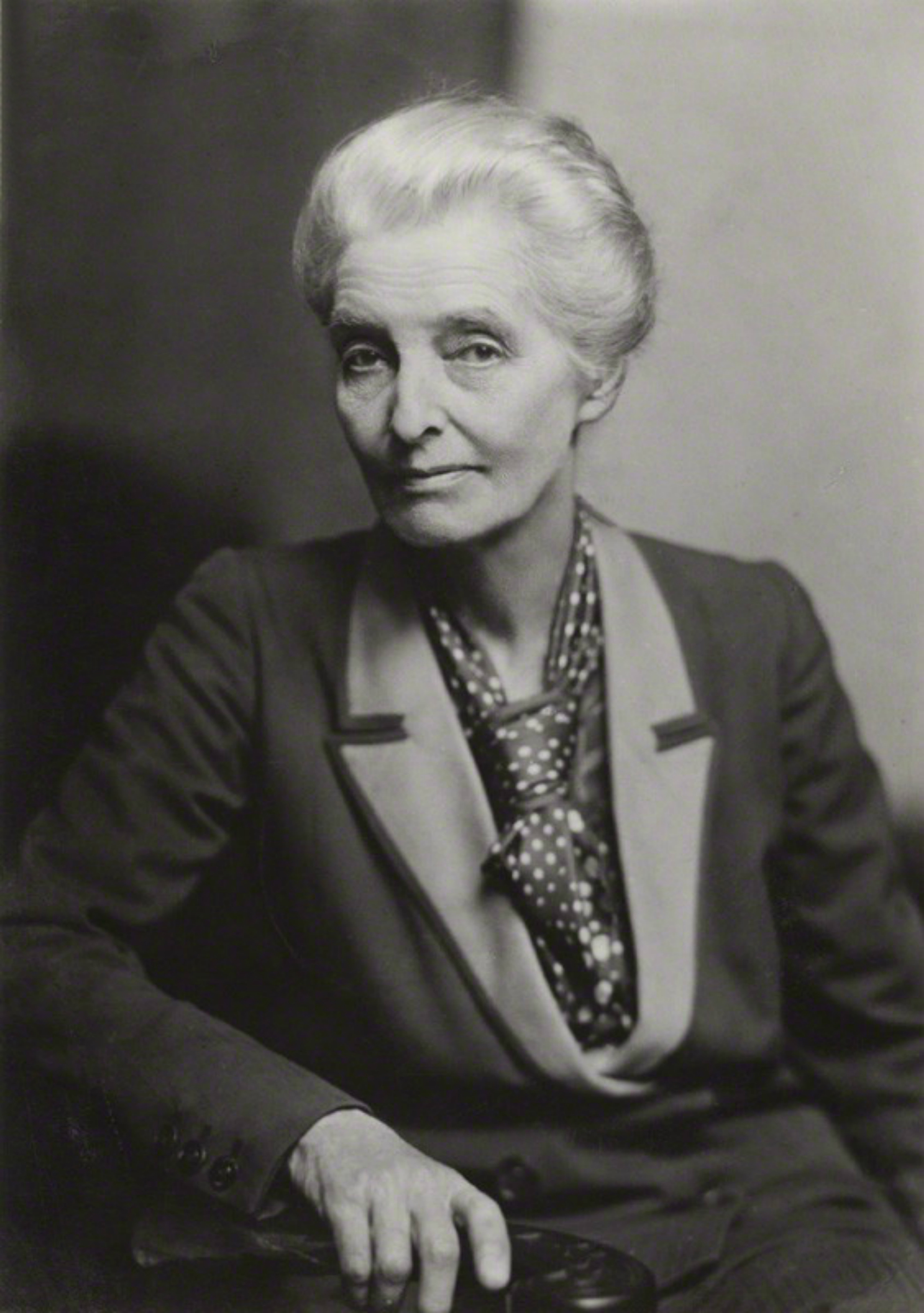
Beatrice Webb, 1943

Shortly afterward, the nonagenarian George Bernard Shaw launched an ultimately successful petition to have the remains of both moved to Westminster Abbey. They now lie buried in the nave of the Abbey, close to the ashes of their Labour Party colleagues Clement Attlee and Ernest Bevin.

Beatrice did not live to see the welfare state set up by the post-war Labour government. It was an enduring monument to her research and campaigning, before and after she married Sidney Webb. First outlined in the Minority report (Poor Law) of 1909, it would remain substantially intact until the 1980s. It is not certain that Beatrice Webb would have approved of the manner of its implementation and future management. As her niece Kitty commented:

... although it was Beatrice herself who put the 20th-century zeitgeist into its most concrete form, in the Welfare State, something in her remained sturdily Victorian to the very end. "What has to be aimed at is not this or that improvement in material circumstances or physical comfort but an improvement in personal character," she wrote. She believed that citizens who were given benefits by the community ought to make an effort to improve themselves, or at least submit themselves to those who would improve them.

== Archives ==
Beatrice Webb's papers, including her diaries, form part of the Passfield archive at the London School of Economics. The Webb Diaries are now digitised and available online at the LSE's Digital Library. Posts about Beatrice Webb regularly appear in the LSE Archives blog, Out of the box.

== Writings ==
For a comprehensive bibliography, see Webbs on the Web, hosted by the London School of Economics.

=== Works by Beatrice Webb ===
- The Co-operative Movement in Great Britain (1891)
- Women and the Factory Acts (1896)
- The Abolition of the Poor Law (1918)
- Wages of Men and Women: Should they be Equal? (1919)
- My Apprenticeship (1926)
- A new Reform Bill (1931)
- Our Partnership (1948), London: Longmans, Green & Co., edited by Barbara Drake & Margaret Cole at the request of Sidney Webb. Covers the period from 1892 up to 1911.
- "The Diary of Beatrice Webb, 1873–1943", complete typescript and manuscript on microfiche, and Index to the Diary of Beatrice Webb 1873–1943 with a preface by Matthew Anderson, "The text of the Diary" by Geoffrey Allen, "Historical Introduction" by Dame Margaret Cole DBE, "The Diary as Literature" by Norman MacKenzie, Chronology. (1978), Chadwyck-Healey Ltd. Bishops Stortford ISBN 0-85964-052-3
- The Diary of Beatrice Webb edited by Norman and Jeanne MacKenzie in 4 vols (1982–85), published by Virago in conjunction with the LSE: London. A one-volume edition, abridged by Lynn Knight, entitled The Diaries of Beatrice Webb was published in 2000. The diaries cover the period from 1873 to 1943; the diaries are also available in typescript and manuscript facsimile at LSE digital library, Beatrice Webb's diaries.

=== Works by Beatrice and Sidney Webb ===
- History of Trade Unionism (1894)
- Industrial Democracy (1897); translated into Russian by Lenin as The Theory and Practice of British Trade Unionism, St Petersburg, 1900.
- The Webbs' Australian Diary (1898)
- Bibliography of road making and maintenance in Great Britain (1906), a sixpenny pamphlet for the Roads Improvement Association.
- English Local Government Vol. I-X (1906 through 1929)
- The Manor and the Borough (1908)
- The Break-Up of the Poor Law (1909)
- English Poor-Law Policy (1910)
- The Co-operative Movement (1914)
- Works Manager Today (1917)
- The Consumers' Co-operative Movement (1921)
- Decay of Capitalist Civilization (1923)
- Methods of Social Study (1932)
- Soviet Communism: A New Civilization? (1935, Vol. I, Vol. II, 1st edn. The 2nd and 3rd editions of 1938 and 1941, respectively, dropped the "?" from the title)
- The Truth About Soviet Russia (1942). The introduction to Soviet Communism (1941), reprinted as a brochure with a preface about the Webbs by George Bernard Shaw, and the text of the 1936 Soviet Constitution, translated by Anna Louise Strong.

== See also ==
- Feminist economics
- List of feminist economists

Party political offices
Preceded by New position	President of the Fabian Society; 1939–1941	Succeeded by Post vacant next: Stafford Cripps
