= Treasury Agreement =

The Treasury Agreement is the name given to the agreement between the British government and the trade unions made in March 1915, during the First World War.

The war exposed British industry's inadequacy in regards to the production of munitions and it was therefore necessary to secure the co-operation of organised labour in maximising production. The first draft of the Defence of the Realm (Amendment) Act 1915 included a clause outlawing strikes and lock-outs in any company engaged in munitions production and another clause introduced compulsory arbitration of workplace disputes. However, the Chancellor of the Exchequer, David Lloyd George, decided to attempt a voluntary agreement with the trade unions. Therefore, during 17–18 March 1915, a conference was held in the Treasury between Lloyd George and the representatives of the trade unionists. Arthur Balfour was also present.

Opening the conference, Lloyd George said that the powers acquired by the government to take over firms capable of munitions production meant that those firms would be turned over entirely to munitions production and that there would be a limitation of private profits. Lloyd George went on to say that as the government would interfere in the rights of capital, it was only fair that the workers should make a similar sacrifice, particularly in suspending those trade union regulations that hampered munitions production. He also said any disputes should be settled by peaceful arbitration.

The trade unionists then drew up a memorandum in response. This was submitted by Arthur Henderson on 19 March and was signed by Lloyd George and Walter Runciman on behalf of the government and by Henderson and Mr. Mosses on behalf of the trade unions. The resulting Treasury Agreement suspended (for the duration of the war) those trade union regulations that hampered munitions production. It also allowed existing bodies of skilled labour to be diluted by semi-skilled and unskilled labour on the condition that these workers were paid the same wages as skilled labour. The Agreement also replaced strikes with arbitration and limited the private profits of manufacturers.

The Agreement was not immediately put into effect because the workers would not implement it before the government had instituted the limitation of private profits. Although Runciman attempted to negotiate with the heads of munitions companies to this end, these discussions came to nothing and the proposals were embodied in the June 1915 Munitions of War Act.
