= Sidney Webb, 1st Baron Passfield =

English socialist economist (1859–1947)

The Right Honourable The Lord Passfield OM PC
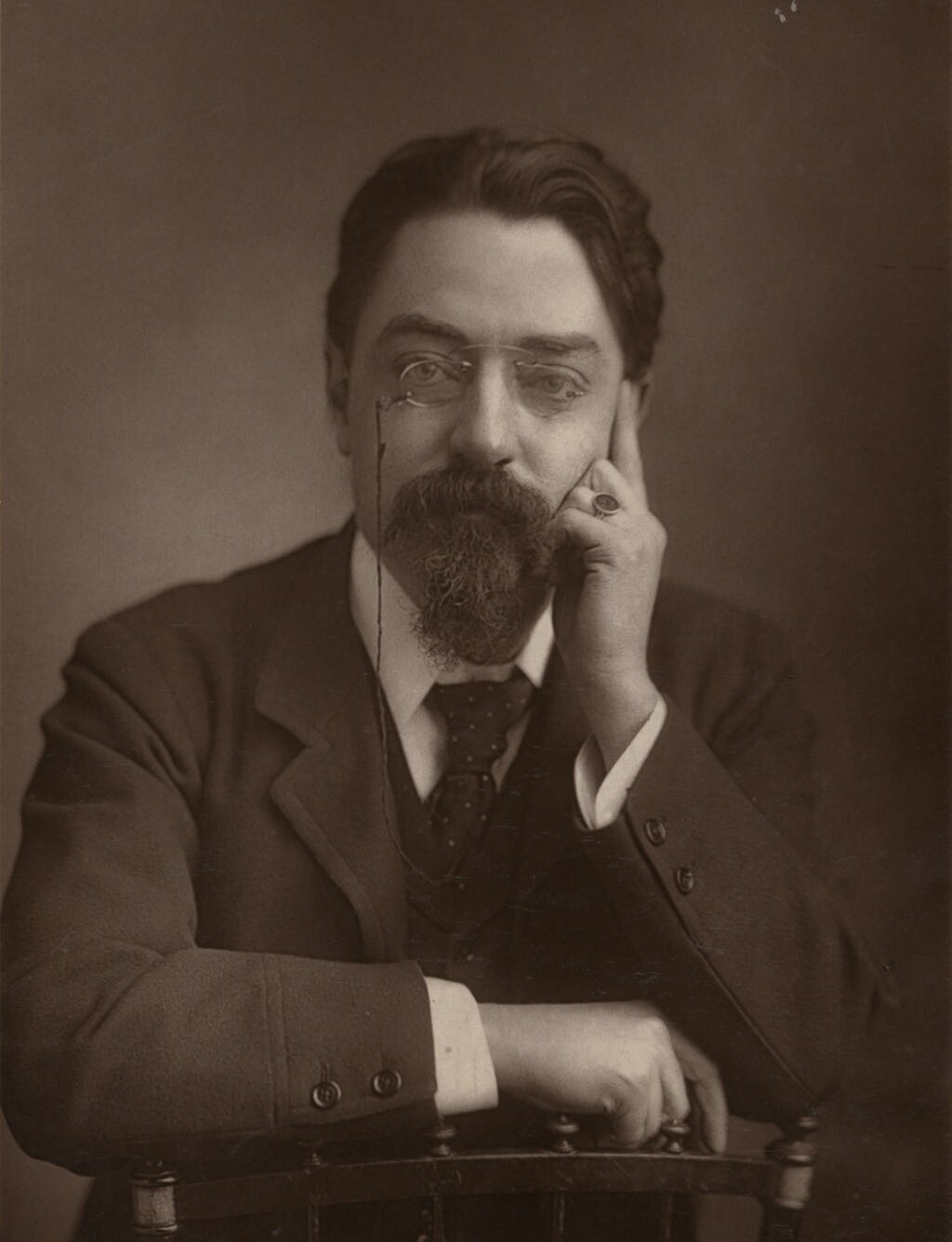
- Webb in 1893

President of the Board of Trade
- In office 22 January 1924 – 3 November 1924
- Monarch: George V
- Prime Minister: Ramsay MacDonald
- Preceded by: Sir Philip Lloyd-Graeme
- Succeeded by: Sir Philip Lloyd-Graeme

Secretary of State for Dominion Affairs
- In office 7 June 1929 – 5 June 1930
- Monarch: George V
- Prime Minister: Ramsay MacDonald
- Preceded by: Leo Amery
- Succeeded by: James Henry Thomas

Secretary of State for the Colonies
- In office 7 June 1929 – 24 August 1931
- Monarch: George V
- Prime Minister: Ramsay MacDonald
- Preceded by: Leo Amery
- Succeeded by: James Henry Thomas

Personal details
- Born: Sidney James Webb; 13 July 1859 London, England
- Died: 13 October 1947 (aged 88) Liphook, Hampshire, England
- Party: Labour
- Spouse: Beatrice Potter (m. 1892; died 1943)
- Education: Birkbeck, University of London; King's College London

Sidney James Webb, 1st Baron Passfield (13 July 1859 – 13 October 1947) was a British socialist, economist and reformer, who co-founded the London School of Economics. He was an early member of the Fabian Society in 1884, joining, like George Bernard Shaw, three months after its inception. Along with his wife Beatrice Webb and with Annie Besant, Graham Wallas, Edward R. Pease, Hubert Bland and Sydney Olivier, Shaw and Webb turned the Fabian Society into the pre-eminent politico-intellectual society in Edwardian England. He wrote the original, pro-nationalisation Clause IV for the British Labour Party.

== Background and education ==
Webb was born at 45, Cranbourn Street, near Leicester Square, London, the second of three children of Charles Webb (1828/9-1891) and Elizabeth Mary (1820/21-1895), née Stacey. His father was "variously described as an accountant, a perfumer, and a hairdresser"; his mother was a "hairdresser and dealer in toiletries". Webb's upbringing was "comfortable", the family employing a live-in servant; his father was "a man of local substance" as a rate collector, guardian, and sergeant in a volunteer regiment. Having attended a "first-class middle class day school" at St Martin's Lane, and his parents having sent him abroad to Switzerland and Germany to extend his education, Webb later studied law at the Birkbeck Literary and Scientific Institution for a degree of the University of London in his spare time, while holding an office job. He also studied at King's College London, before being called to the Bar at Gray's Inn in 1885.

== Professional life ==
In 1895, Webb helped to found the London School of Economics with a bequest left to the Fabian Society. He was appointed its Professor of Public Administration in 1912 and held the post for 15 years. In 1892, he married Beatrice Potter, who shared his interests and beliefs. The money she contributed to the marriage enabled him to give up his clerical job and concentrate on his other activities. Sidney and Beatrice Webb founded the New Statesman magazine in 1913.

== Political career ==
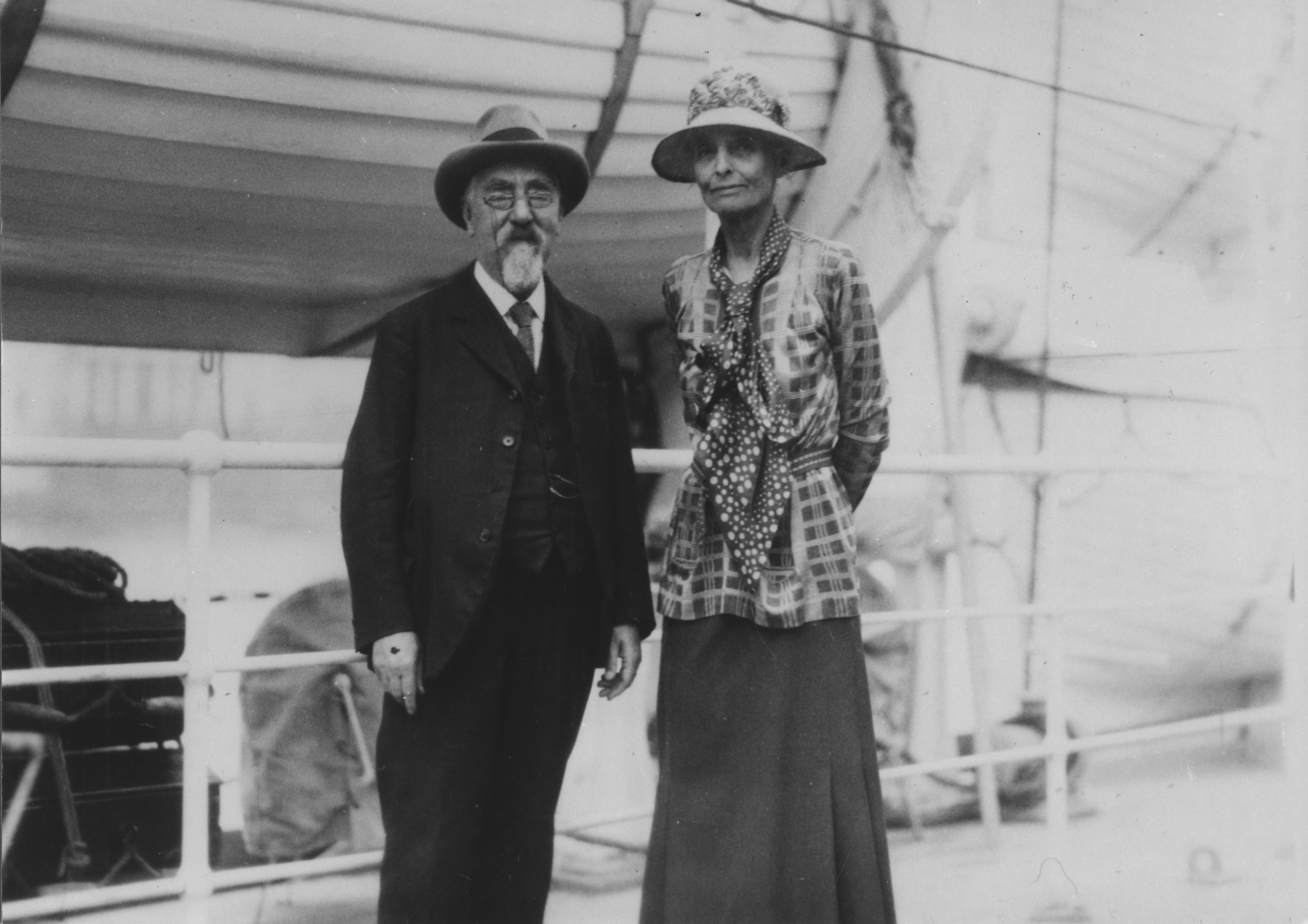
Sidney Webb and Beatrice Webb

Webb and Potter were members of the Labour Party and took an active role in politics. Sidney became Member of Parliament for Seaham at the 1922 general election. The couple's influence can be seen in their hosting of the Coefficients, a dining club that drew in some leading statesmen and thinkers of the day. In 1929, he was created Baron Passfield of Passfield Corner in the County of Southampton. He served as Secretary of State for the Colonies and as Secretary of State for Dominion Affairs in Ramsay MacDonald's second Labour Government in 1929.

As Colonial Secretary he issued the Passfield White Paper that revised the government policy on Palestine, previously set by the Churchill White Paper of 1922. In 1930, failing health caused him to step down as Dominions Secretary, but he stayed on as Colonial Secretary until the fall of the Labour government in August 1931.

== Writings ==
Webb co-authored with his wife The History of Trade Unionism (1894). For the Fabian Society he wrote on poverty in London, the eight-hour day, land nationalisation, the nature of socialism, education, eugenics, and reform of the House of Lords. He also drafted Clause IV, which committed the Labour Party to public control of "the means of production, distribution, and exchange" - farming, industry, services.

== References in literature ==
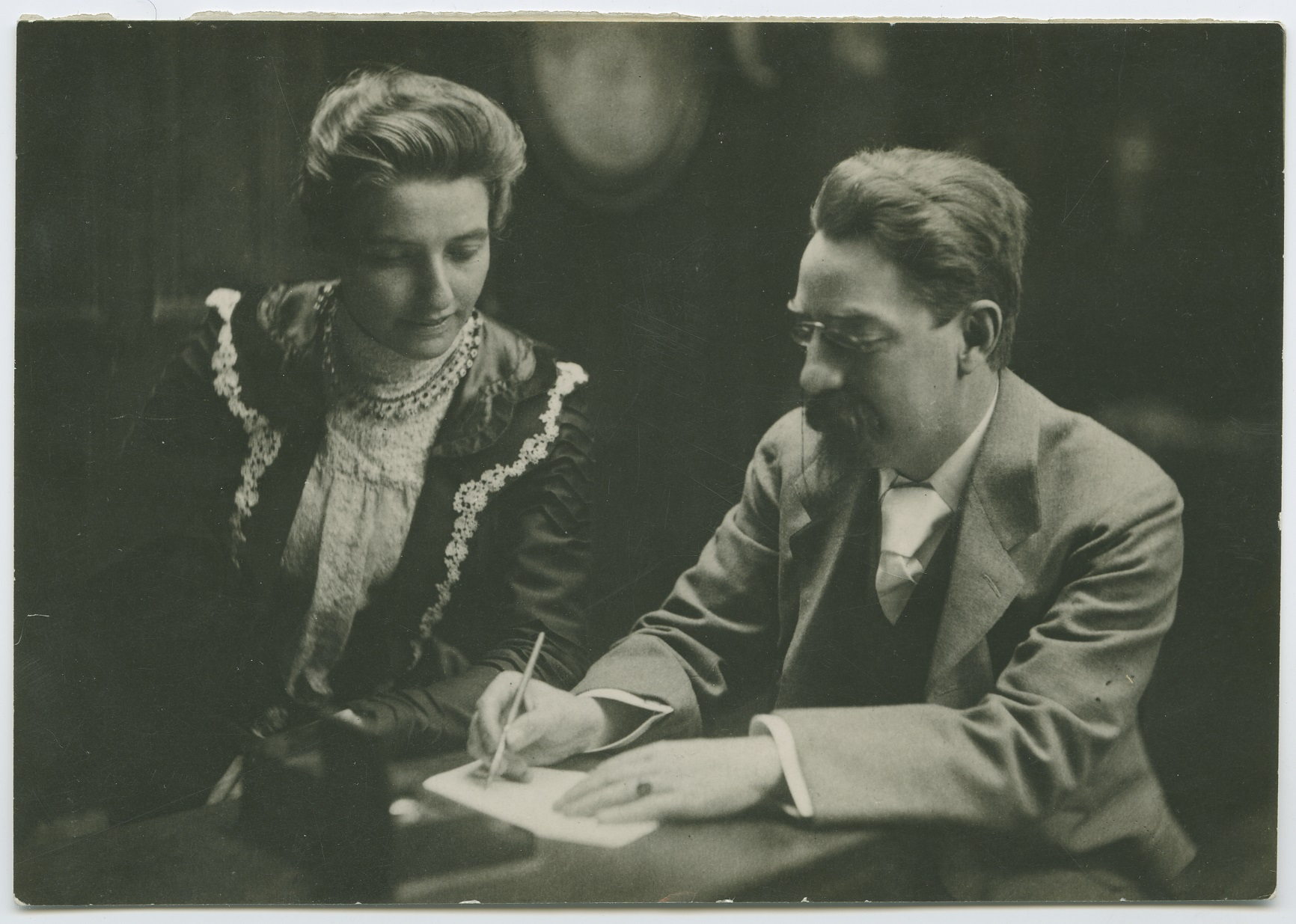
Beatrice and Sidney Webb working together in 1895

In H. G. Wells' The New Machiavelli (1911), the Webbs, as "the Baileys", are mercilessly lampooned as short-sighted, bourgeois manipulators. The Fabian Society, of which Wells was briefly a member (1903–1908), fares no better in his estimation.

Beatrice Webb in her diary records that they "read the caricatures of ourselves... with much interest and amusement. The portraits are very clever in a malicious way." She reviews the book and Wells's character, summarising: "As an attempt at representing a political philosophy the book utterly fails..."

== Personal life ==
When his wife, Beatrice, died in 1943, the casket of her ashes was buried in the garden of their house in Passfield Corner, as were those of Lord Passfield in 1947.

Shortly afterwards, George Bernard Shaw launched a petition to have both reburied in Westminster Abbey, which was eventually granted – the Webbs' ashes are interred in the nave, close to those of Clement Attlee and Ernest Bevin.

The Webbs were also friends of philosopher Bertrand Russell.

In 2006, the London School of Economics, alongside the Housing Association, renamed its Great Dover Street student residence Sidney Webb House in his honour.

== Archives ==
Sidney Webb's papers form part of the Passfield archive at the London School of Economics. Posts about Sidney Webb regularly appear in the LSE Archives blog.

== Bibliography ==
Works by Sidney Webb

- Facts for Socialists (1887)
- Fabian Essays in Socialism – The Basis of Socialism – Historic (1889)
- "Socialism in England". Publications of the American Economic Association. 4 (2). April 1889.
- A plea for an eight hours bill (1890)
- English progress towards social democracy (1890)
- Practicable land nationalization (1890)
- The workers' political programme (1890)
- What the farm laborer wants (1890)
- A Labour policy for public authorities (1891)
- London's neglected heritage (1891)
- London's water tribute (1891)
- Municipal tramways (1891)
- The municipalisation of the gas supply (1891)
- The reform of the poor law (1891)
- The scandal of London's markets (1891)
- The "unearned increment" (1891)
- Socialism : true and false (1894)
- The London vestries: what they are and what they do: with map, table of vestries, etc. (1894)
- The difficulties of individualism (1896)
- Labor in the longest reign (1837-1897) (1897)
- The economics of direct employment (1898)
- Five years' fruits of the Parish Councils Act (1901)
- The education muddle and the way out (1901)
- Twentieth century politics : a policy of national efficiency (1901)
- The Education Act, 1902 : how to make the best of it (1903)
- London Education (1904)
- The London Education Act, 1903 : how to make the best of it (1904)
- Paupers and old age pensions (1907)
- The decline in the birth-rate (1907)
- Grants in Aid: A Criticism and a Proposal (1911)
- The necessary basis of society (1911)
- The Economic Theory of a Legal Minimum Wage (1912)
- Seasonal Trades, with A. Freeman (1912)
- What about the rates? : or, Municipal finance and municipal autonomy (1913)
- The War and the workers : handbook of some immediate measures to prevent unemployment and relieve distress (1914)
- The Restoration of Trade Union Conditions (1916)
- When peace comes : the way of industrial reconstruction (1916)
- The reform of the House of Lords (1917)
- The teacher in politics (1918)
- National finance and a levy on capital (1919)
- The root of labour unrest (1920)
- The constitutional problems of a co-operative society (1923)
- The Labour Party on the threshold (1923)
- The need for federal reorganisation in the co-operative movement (1923)
- The Local Government Act, 1929 - how to make the best of it (1929)
- What happened in 1931: a record (1932)

Works by Sidney and Beatrice Webb

- History of Trade Unionism (1894)
- Industrial Democracy (1897); translated into Russian by Lenin as The Theory and Practice of British Trade Unionism, St Petersburg, 1900
- Problems of Modern Industry (1898)
- Bibliography of road making and maintenance in Great Britain (1906)
- English Local Government (1906 through 1929) Vol. I–X
- The Manor and the Borough (1908)
- The Break-Up of the Poor Law (1909)
- English Poor Law Policy (1910)
- The Cooperative Movement (1914)
- Works Manager Today (1917)
- The Consumer's Cooperative Movement (1921)
- Decay of Capitalist Civilization (1923)
- Methods of Social Study (1932)
- Soviet Communism: A new civilisation? (1st ed.). 1935 – via Internet Archive. Vol I Vol II) (the 2nd and 3rd editions of 1941 and 1944 did not have "?" in the title)
- The Truth About Soviet Russia (1942)

== Notes ==
Parliament of the United Kingdom
Preceded by Evan Hayward	Member of Parliament for Seaham; 1922–1929	Succeeded by Ramsay MacDonald
Party political offices
Preceded by Fred Jowett	Chair of the Labour Party; 1922–1923	Succeeded by Ramsay MacDonald
Political offices
Preceded by Sir Philip Lloyd-Greame	President of the Board of Trade; 1924	Succeeded by Sir Philip Lloyd-Greame
Preceded by Leo Amery	Secretary of State for Dominion Affairs; 1929–1930	Succeeded by James Henry Thomas
Preceded by Leo Amery	Secretary of State for the Colonies; 1929–1931	Succeeded by James Henry Thomas
