= List of Fabian Tracts (1916–present) =

This is an incomplete list of Fabian Tracts of The Fabian Society published from 1916 that continues the List of Fabian Tracts to 1915.

Entries are in the form Tract Number/Title/Author.

== 1916 ==
179. John Ruskin and social ethics. Edith J. Morley. (Published 1917?)

180. The Philosophy of Socialism. A. Clutton Brock.

181. When Peace Comes: The Way of Industrial Reconstruction. Sidney Webb.

== 1917 ==
182. Robert Owen, idealist. C.E.M. Joad.

183. The reform of the House of Lords. Sidney Webb.

184. The Russian Revolution and British Democracy. Julius West.

== 1918 ==
185. The abolition of the poor law. Beatrice Webb.

186. Central Africa and the League of Nations. R C Hawkin

187. The teacher in politics. Sidney Webb

== 1919 ==
188. National finance and a levy on capital: what the Labour Party intends. Sidney Webb

== 1920 ==
189. Urban district councils: their constitution, powers and duties. C M Lloyd

190. Metropolitan borough councils: their constitution, powers and duties. C R Attlee

191. Borough Councils: their constitution, powers and duties. C R Attlee

192. Guild socialism. G D H Cole

193. Housing. C M Lloyd

194. Tax rates and local income tax. Robert Jones

195. The scandal of the poor law. C M Lloyd

196. The root of labour unrest: an address to employers and managers. C M Lloyd

== 1921 ==
197. The International Labour Organisation of the League of Nations. The Fabian Society

== 1922 ==
198. Some problems of education. The Fabian Society

199. William Lovett. L. Barbara Hammond

200. The state in the new social order. Harold J Laski

201. International co-operative trade. Leonard Woolf

== 1923 ==
202. The constitutional problems of a co-operative society. Sidney Webb

203. The need for federal reorganisation in the co-operative movement. Sidney Webb

204. The position of employees in the co-operative movement. Lilian Harris

205. Co-operative education. Lilian A. Dawson

206. The co-operator in politics. Alfred Barnes

207. The Labour Party on the threshold. Sidney Webb

== 1924 to 2000 ==
See LSE Digital Library online reference listing tracts to No. 597 in 2000.
