= List of Fabian Tracts (1884–1915) =

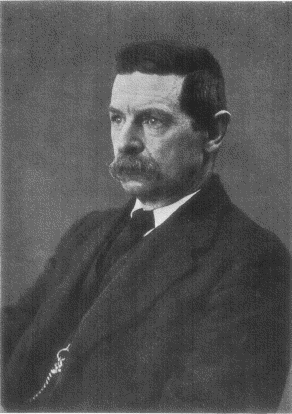
Edward R. Pease, founding member and secretary of the Fabian Society

This is a list of Fabian Tracts of The Fabian Society published from its founding in 1884 until 2000. Edward R. Pease – a founding member and secretary of the Fabian Society – published a documentation of its history in 1916, which lists all tracts up until 1915. All tracts from 1884 until 2000 can be viewed on the London School of Economics (LSE) Digital Library.

Many tracts were issued without the author's name and not all authors were members of the Society. An asterisk (*) signifies the author being a non-member.

Entries (until 1915) are noted in the following form: tract number, title, pages, author, year.

== 1884 ==
Number	Title	Pages	Author	Year
1	Why are the Many Poor?	4	W.L. Phillips	1884
2	A Manifesto	4	G. Bernard Shaw	1884
3	To Provident Landlords and Capitalists: A Suggestion and a Warning	4	G. Bernard Shaw	1885
4	What Socialism Is	12	Charlotte M. Wilson and others	1886
5	Facts for Socialists	16	Sidney Webb	1887
6	The True Radical Programme (Fabian Parliamentary League)	12	G. Bernard Shaw	1887
7	Capital and Land	16	Sydney Olivier	1888
8	Facts for Londoners	56	Sidney Webb	1889
9	An Eight Hours Bill	16	Sidney Webb	1889
10	Figures for Londoners	4	Sidney Webb	1889
11	The Workers' Political Programme	20	Sidney Webb	1890
12	Practical Land Nationalisation	4	Sidney Webb	1890
13	What Socialism Is	4	Bernard Shaw	1890
14	The New Reform Bill	20	J. F. Oakeshott and others	1890
15	English Progress towards Social Democracy	16	Sidney Webb	1890
16	A Plea for an Eight Hours Bill	4	Sidney Webb	1890
17	Reform of the Poor Law	20	Sidney Webb	1890
18	Facts for Bristol	20	Hartmann W. Just	1890
19	What the Farm Labourer Wants	4	Sidney Webb	1890
20	Questions for Poor Law Guardians	4	South West Group	1890
21	Questions for London Vestrymen	4	C. Foulger	1890
22	The Truth about Leasehold Enfranchisement	4	Sidney Webb	1890

== 1891 ==
23. The Case for an Eight Hours Bill. 16 pp. Sidney Webb.

24. Questions for Parliamentary Candidates. 4 pp. Sidney Webb.

25. Questions for School Board Candidates. 4 pp. Sidney Webb.

26. Questions for London County Councillors. 4 pp. Sidney Webb.

27. Questions for Town Councillors. 4 pp. Rev. C. Peach.

28. Questions for County Council Candidates (Rural). 4 pp. F. Hudson.

29. What to Read. 48 pp. Graham Wallas (1st edition). (Fifth edition, 1910, not included in the series.)

30. The Unearned Increment. 4 pp. Sidney Webb.

31. London's Heritage in the City Guilds. 4 pp. Sidney Webb.

32. The Municipalisation of the Gas Supply. 4 pp. Sidney Webb.

33. Municipal Tramways. 4 pp. Sidney Webb.

34. London's Water Tribute. 4 pp. Sidney Webb.

35. The Municipalisation of the London Docks. 4 pp. Sidney Webb.

36. The Scandal of London's Markets. 4 pp. Sidney Webb.

37. A Labour Policy for Public Authorities. 4 pp. Sidney Webb.

38. Welsh Translation of No. 1.

== 1892 ==
39. A Democratic Budget. 16 pp. J.F. Oakeshott .

40. Fabian Election Manifesto. 16 pp. Bernard Shaw.

41. The Fabian Society: What it has done and how it has done it. 32 pp. G. Bernard Shaw.

42. Christian Socialism. 16 pp. Rev. Stewart D. Headlam.

43. Vote! Vote! Vote! 2 pp. Bernard Shaw.

== 1893 ==
44. A Plea for Poor Law Reform. 4 pp. Frederick Whelen .

45. Impossibilities of Anarchism. 28 pp. G. Bernard Shaw.

46. Socialism and Sailors. 16 pp. B.T. Hall.

47. The Unemployed. (Rt. Hon.) John Burns.

48. Eight Hours by Law. Henry W. Macrosty.

== 1894 ==
49. A Plan of Campaign for Labour. 28 pp. G. Bernard Shaw.

50. Sweating: Its Cause and Remedy. 16 pp. H.W. Macrosty.

51. Socialism: True and False. 20 pp. Sidney Webb.

52. State Education at Home and Abroad. 16 pp. John William Martin.

53. The Parish Councils Act: What it is and how to work it. 20 pp. (Rt. Hon.) Herbert Samuel.*

54. Humanising of the Poor Law. 24 pp. J.F. Oakeshott.

55. The Workers' School Board Programme. 20 pp. J.W. Martin.

56. Questions for Parish Council Candidates. 4 pp. (Rt. Hon.) Herbert Samuel.*

57. Questions for Rural District Council Candidates. 4 pp. (Rt. Hon.) Herbert Samuel.*

58. Allotments and How to Get Them. 4 pp. (Rt. Hon.) Herbert Samuel.*

59. Questions for Candidates for Urban District Councils. 4 pp.

60. The London Vestries: What they are and what they do. 20 pp. Sidney Webb.

== 1895 ==
61. The London County Council: What it is and what it does. 16 pp. J.F. Oakeshott.

62. Parish and District Councils: What they are and what they can do. 16 pp. (No. 53 re-written.)

63. Parish Council Cottages and how to get them. 4 pp. Edward R. Pease.

64. How to Lose and how to Win an Election. 2 pp. Ramsay MacDonald.

65. Trade Unionists and Politics. 2 pp. Frank Wallace Galton.

66. A Program for Workers. 2 pp. Edw. R. Pease.

== 1896 ==
67. Women and the Factory Acts. 16 pp. Mrs. Sidney Webb.

68. The Tenant's Sanitary Catechism. 4 pp. Arthur Hickmott.

69. The Difficulties of Individualism. 20 pp. Sidney Webb.

70. Report on Fabian Policy. 16 pp. Bernard Shaw.

71. The (London) Tenant's Sanitary Catechism. 4 pp. Miss Grove.

72. The Moral Aspects of Socialism. 24 pp. Sidney Ball.

73. The Case for State Pensions in Old Age. 16 pp. George Turner.

74. The State and Its Functions in New Zealand. 16 pp. The Hon. W. P. Reeves.*

== 1897 ==
75. Labour in the Longest Reign. 20 pp. Sidney Webb.

76. Houses for the People. 20 pp. Arthur Hickmott.

77. The Municipalisation of Tramways. 16 pp. F.T.H. Henlé.

78. Socialism and the Teaching of Christ. 16 pp. Rev. John Clifford, D.D.

79. A Word of Remembrance and Caution to the Rich. 16 pp. John Woolman.*

80. Shop Life and its Reform. 16 pp. William Johnson.

81. Municipal Water. 4 pp. C.M. Knowles.*

82. The Workmen's Compensation Act. 20 pp. C.R. Allen, junr.

83. State Arbitration and the Living Wage. 16 pp. H.W. Macrosty.

84. The Economics of Direct Employment. 16 pp. Sidney Webb.

85. Liquor Licensing at Home and Abroad. 16 pp. Edw. R. Pease.

86. Municipal Drink Traffic. 20 pp. Edw. R. Pease.

== 1899 ==
87. A Welsh Translation of No. 78. 16 pp.

88. The Growth of Monopoly in English Industry. 16 pp. Henry W. Macrosty.

89. Old Age Pensions at Work. 4 pp. Bullock.

90. The Municipalisation of the Milk Supply. 4 pp. Dr. G.F. McCleary.

91. Municipal Pawnshops. 4 pp. Charles Charrington.

92. Municipal Slaughterhouses. 4 pp. George Standring.

== 1900 ==
93. Women as Councillors. 4 pp. Bernard Shaw.

94. Municipal Bakeries. 4 pp. Dr. G.F. McCleary.

95. Municipal Hospitals. 4 pp. Do.

96. Municipal Fire Insurance. 4 pp. (1901). Mary Macpherson.

97. Municipal Steamboats. 4 pp. (1901). Sidney Shallard.

98. State Railways for Ireland. 16 pp. Clement Edwards (M.P.).

99. Local Government in Ireland. C.R. Allen, junr.

100. Metropolitan Borough Councils: Their Powers and Duties. 20 pp. Henry W. Macrosty.

101. The House Famine and How to Relieve it. 52 pp. Various.

102. Questions for Candidates: Metropolitan Borough Councils. 4 pp. H.W. Macrosty.

103. Overcrowding in London and its Remedy. 16 pp. W. C. Steadman, M.P.

104. How Trade Unions Benefit Workmen. 4 pp. Edw. R. Pease.

== 1901 ==
105. Five Years' Fruit of the Parish Councils Act. 24 pp Sidney Webb.

106. The Education Muddle and the Way Out. 20 pp. Sidney Webb.

107. Socialism for Millionaires. 16 pp. Bernard Shaw.

108. Twentieth Century Politics: A Policy of National Efficiency. 16 pp. Sidney Webb.

== 1902 ==
109. Cottage Plans and Common Sense. 16 pp. Raymond Unwin.

110. Problems of Indian Poverty. 16 pp. S.S. Thorburn.*

111. Reform of Reformatories and Industrial Schools. 16 pp. H.T. Holmes.

112. Life in the Laundry. 16 pp. Dr. G.F. McCleary.

== 1903 ==
113. Communism. 16 pp. William Morris.* Preface by Bernard Shaw.

114. The Education Act, 1902. How to make the best of it. 20 pp. Sidney Webb.

115. State Aid to Agriculture. 16 pp. T.S. Dymond.*

== 1904 ==
116. Fabianism and the Fiscal Question: An Alternative Policy. 28 pp. Bernard Shaw.

117. The London Education Act, 1903: How to make the best of it. 20 pp. Sidney Webb.

118. The Secret of Rural Depopulation. 20 pp. Lieut.-Col. D.C. Pedder.*

== 1905 ==
119. Public Control of Electric Power and Transit. 16 pp. S.G. Hobson.

120. After Bread, Education. 16 pp. Hubert Bland.

121. Public Service versus Private Expenditure. 12 pp. Sir Oliver Lodge.*

122. Municipal Milk and Public Health. 20 pp. F. Lawson Dodd.

123. The Revival of Agriculture: A National Policy for Great Britain. 24 pp. Henry W. Macrosty.

124. State Control of Trusts. 16 pp. Henry W. Macrosty.

125. Municipalisation by Provinces. 16 pp. William Stephen Sanders.

== 1906 ==
126. The Abolition of Poor Law Guardians. 24 pp. Edw. R. Pease.

127. Socialism and Labour Policy. 16 pp. Hubert Bland (Editor).

128. The Case for a Legal Minimum Wage. 20 pp. W. Stephen Sanders.

129. More Books to Read. 20 pp. Edw. R. Pease.

== 1907 ==
130. Home Work and Sweating: The Causes and Remedies. 20 pp. B. L. Hutchins.

131. The Decline in the Birth-rate. 20 pp. Sidney Webb.

132. A Guide to Books for Socialists. 12 pp. "The Nursery."

133. Socialism and Christianity. 24 pp. Rev. Percy Dearmer, D.D.

134. Small Holdings, Allotments, and Common Pastures. 4 pp. Revised edition of No. 58.

135. Paupers and Old Age Pensions. 16 pp. Sidney Webb.

136. The Village and the Landlord. 12 pp. Edward Carpenter.

== 1908 ==
137. Parish Councils and Village Life. 28pp. Revised version of No. 105.

138. Municipal Trading. 20 pp. Aylmer Maude.

139. Socialism and the Churches. 16 pp. Rev. John Clifford, D.D.

140. Child Labour Under Capitalism. 20 pp. Mrs. Hylton Dale.

== 1909 ==
141. (Welsh Translation of No. 139).

142. Rent and Value. 12 pp. Adapted by Mrs. Bernard Shaw from Fabian Essays, The Economic Basis.

143. Sosialaeth Yng Ngoleuni'R Beibl (Welsh). J.R. Jones.

144. Machinery: Its Masters and its Servants. 20 pp. Henry Herman Schloesser and Clement Game.

145. The Case for School Nurseries. 20 pp. Emily Townshend.

146. Socialism and Superior Brains. A Reply to Mr. Mallock. 24 pp. Bernard Shaw.

147. Capital and Compensation. 16 pp. Edward R. Pease.

148. What a Health Committee can do. 16 pp. Miss B.L. Hutchins.

== 1910 ==
149. The Endowment of Motherhood. 24 pp. Henry D. Harben.

150. State Purchase of Railways: A Practicable Scheme. 24 pp. Emil Davies.

151. The Point of Honour. A Correspondence on Aristocracy and Socialism. 16 pp. Mrs. Ruth Cavendish Bentinck.

== 1911 ==
152. Our Taxes as they are and as they ought to be. 20 pp. Robert Jones.

153. The Twentieth Century Reform Bill. 20 pp. Henry H. Schloesser (Slesser).

154. The Case for School Clinics. 16 pp. L. Haden Guest.

155. The Case against the Referendum. 20 pp. Clifford D. Sharp.

156. What an Education Committee can do (Elementary Schools). 36 pp. The Education Group.

157. The Working Life of Women. 16 pp. Miss B.L. Hutchins.

158. The Case Against the Charity Organisation Society. 20 pp. Mrs. Townshend.

159. The Necessary Basis of Society. 12 pp. Sidney Webb.

160. A National Medical Service. 20 pp. F. Lawson Dodd.

== 1912 ==
161. Afforestation and Unemployment. 16 pp. Arthur P. Grenfell.

162. Family Life on a Pound a Week. 24 pp. Mrs. Pember Reeves.

163. Women and Prisons. 28 pp. Helen Blagg and Charlotte Wilson.

164. Gold and State Banking. A Study in the Economics of Monopoly. 20 pp. Edward R. Pease.

165. Francis Place: The Tailor of Charing Cross. 28 pp. St. John G. Ervine.

166. Robert Owen: Social Reformer. 24 pp. Miss B.L. Hutchins.

167. William Morris and the Communist Ideal. 24 pp. Mrs. Townshend.

== 1913 ==
168. John Stuart Mill. 24 pp. Julius West.

169. The Socialist Movement in Germany. 28 pp. W. Stephen Sanders.

170. Profit-Sharing and Co-partnership: A fraud and a failure? 16 pp. Edward R. Pease.

171. The Nationalisation of Mines and Minerals Bill. 16 pp. Henry H. Schloesser (Slesser).

172. What about the Rates, or Municipal Finance and Municipal Autonomy. 12 pp. Sidney Webb.

173. Public versus Private Electricity Supply. 20 pp. C. Ashmore Baker.*

== 1914 ==
174. Charles Kingsley and Christian Socialism. 28 pp. Colwyn E. Vulliamy.

175. The Economic Foundations of the Women's Movement. 24 pp. M.A. (Mabel Atkinson).

176. War and the Workers. Handbook of some immediate measures to prevent Unemployment and relieve distress. 24 pp. Sidney Webb.

== 1915 ==
177. Socialism and the Arts of Use. 16 pp. A. Clutton Brock.

178. The War; Women; and Unemployment. 28 pp. The Women's Group Executive.

== 1916 ==
179. John Ruskin and social ethics. Edith J. Morley. (Published 1917?)

180. The Philosophy of Socialism. A. Clutton Brock.

181. When Peace Comes: The Way of Industrial Reconstruction. Sidney Webb.

== 1917 ==
182. Robert Owen, idealist. C.E.M. Joad.

183. The reform of the House of Lords. Sidney Webb.

184. The Russian Revolution and British Democracy. Julius West.

== 1918 ==
185. The abolition of the poor law. Beatrice Webb.

186. Central Africa and the League of Nations. R C Hawkin

187. The teacher in politics. Sidney Webb

== 1919 ==
188. National finance and a levy on capital: what the Labour Party intends. Sidney Webb

== 1920 ==
189. Urban district councils: their constitution, powers and duties. C M Lloyd

190. Metropolitan borough councils: their constitution, powers and duties. C R Attlee

191. Borough Councils: their constitution, powers and duties. C R Attlee

192. Guild socialism. G D H Cole

193. Housing. C M Lloyd

194. Tax rates and local income tax. Robert Jones

195. The scandal of the poor law. C M Lloyd

196. The root of labour unrest: an address to employers and managers. C M Lloyd

== 1921 ==
197. The International Labour Organisation of the League of Nations. The Fabian Society

== 1922 ==
198. Some problems of education. The Fabian Society

199. William Lovett. L. Barbara Hammond

200. The state in the new social order. Harold J Laski

201. International co-operative trade. Leonard Woolf

== 1923 ==
202. The constitutional problems of a co-operative society. Sidney Webb

203. The need for federal reorganisation in the co-operative movement. Sidney Webb

204. The position of employees in the co-operative movement. Lilian Harris

205. Co-operative education. Lilian A. Dawson

206. The co-operator in politics. Alfred Barnes

207. The Labour Party on the threshold. Sidney Webb

== 1924 to 2000 ==
See LSE Digital Library online reference listing tracts to No. 597 in 2000.
