= Dorothy Galton =

British university administrator

Dorothy Galton

Dorothy Constance Galton (14 October 1901 – 27 August 1992) was a British university administrator who was suspected by the British security services of being a Russian spy. Born in north London into a family with strong left-wing links, she was personal secretary to Count Mihaly Karolyi, exiled socialist president of Hungary, and later became secretary to the School of Slavonic and East European Studies in London.

Galton joined the Communist Party of Great Britain, travelled several times to Russia, and Kim Philby, who was actually working for the KGB, took an interest in her. She was under some form of surveillance for much of her working life but no conclusive evidence of espionage was ever found against her. In retirement she became an expert in beekeeping and wrote several books on the subject.

== Early life ==
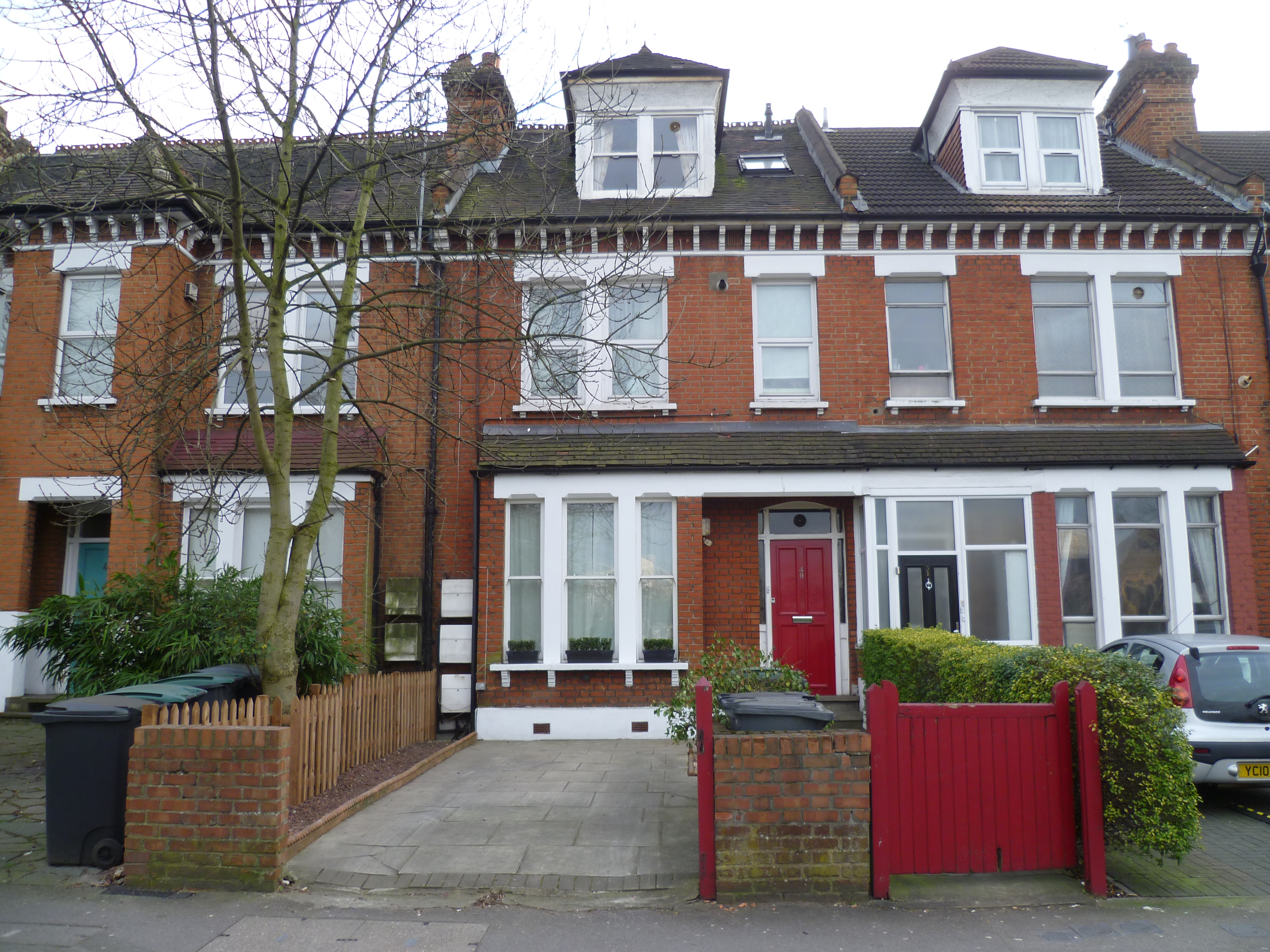
Modern view of Galton's childhood home (centre) in Wood Green, London

Dorothy Galton was born on 14 October 1901 at 66 Rathcoole Avenue, Hornsey, London, to Frank Wallace (or Wallis) Galton and his wife, Jessie Jane Townsend Galton, née Cottridge. Her father was secretary to Sidney and Beatrice Webb and later, the Fabian Society. She had an older sister Beatrice Jessie Galton. At the time of the 1911 census, the family were living at 49 Bounds Green Road, Wood Green, London. She was educated at home and then at a secondary school in Wood Green. She attended Bedford College, the University of London's college for women, but soon left and did not earn a degree. She studied Slavonic languages privately. As a young woman she underwent an operation that prevented her from having children.

== Early career ==
Galton's early working life was as an assistant in the research and information department of the Labour Party from 1920 to 1925 and then in 1925-26 as private secretary to Count Mihaly Karolyi, the exiled socialist president of Hungary, during which time she travelled with him and his wife to France. It was around this time that Galton first came to official notice after her work for Karolyi was noted in a report to Scotland Yard from Paris. It seems that after she stopped working for Karolyi she was occupied translating from French to English, Émile Faguet's Politiques et moralistes du XIXe siècle which was published by Ernest Benn in 1928 as Politicians & moralists of the nineteenth century in their Library of European Political Thought.

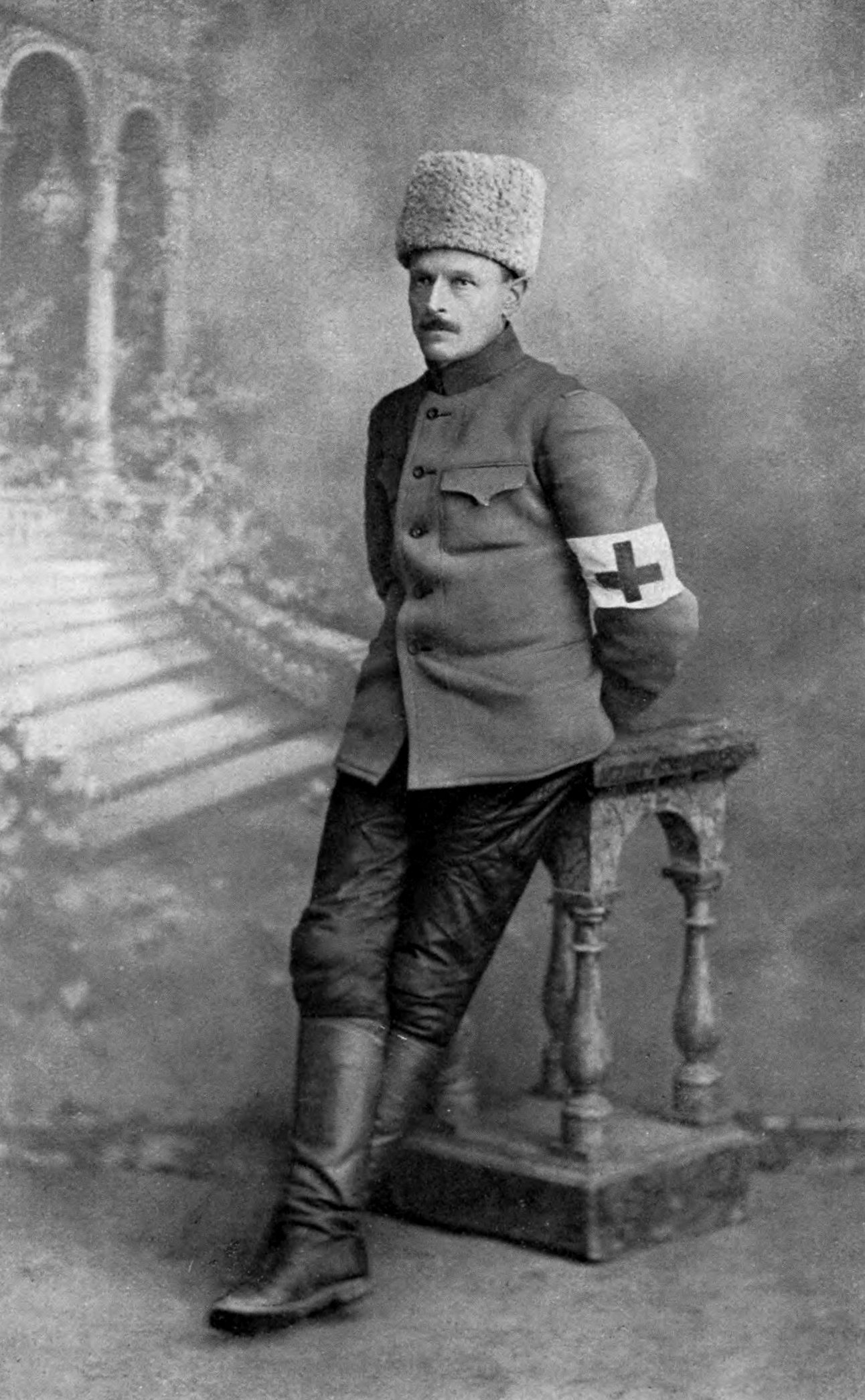
Bernard Pares, later first director of SSEES, in Russia during the First World War

In 1928, Galton became secretary to professor Bernard Pares at the School of Slavonic and East European Studies (SSEES), at that time part of King's College London. When the school became an independent body in 1932, Galton became its administrative secretary. Later, Galton's tenure at SSEES included the directorships of William Rose and George Bolsover.

While at SSEES, Galton got to know D.S. Mirsky ("Prince Mirsky") well. She wrote that they dined together when Mirsky had money and he indulged his prodigious appetite for food and drink and recited poetry in one of his four languages while she sipped wine. Mirsky's letters to Galton from Moscow from 1932, when he returned to the USSR, to 1937, when he was arrested, were published in the Oxford Slavonic Papers in 1996. Mirsky died in a gulag in 1939.

== Political activity ==
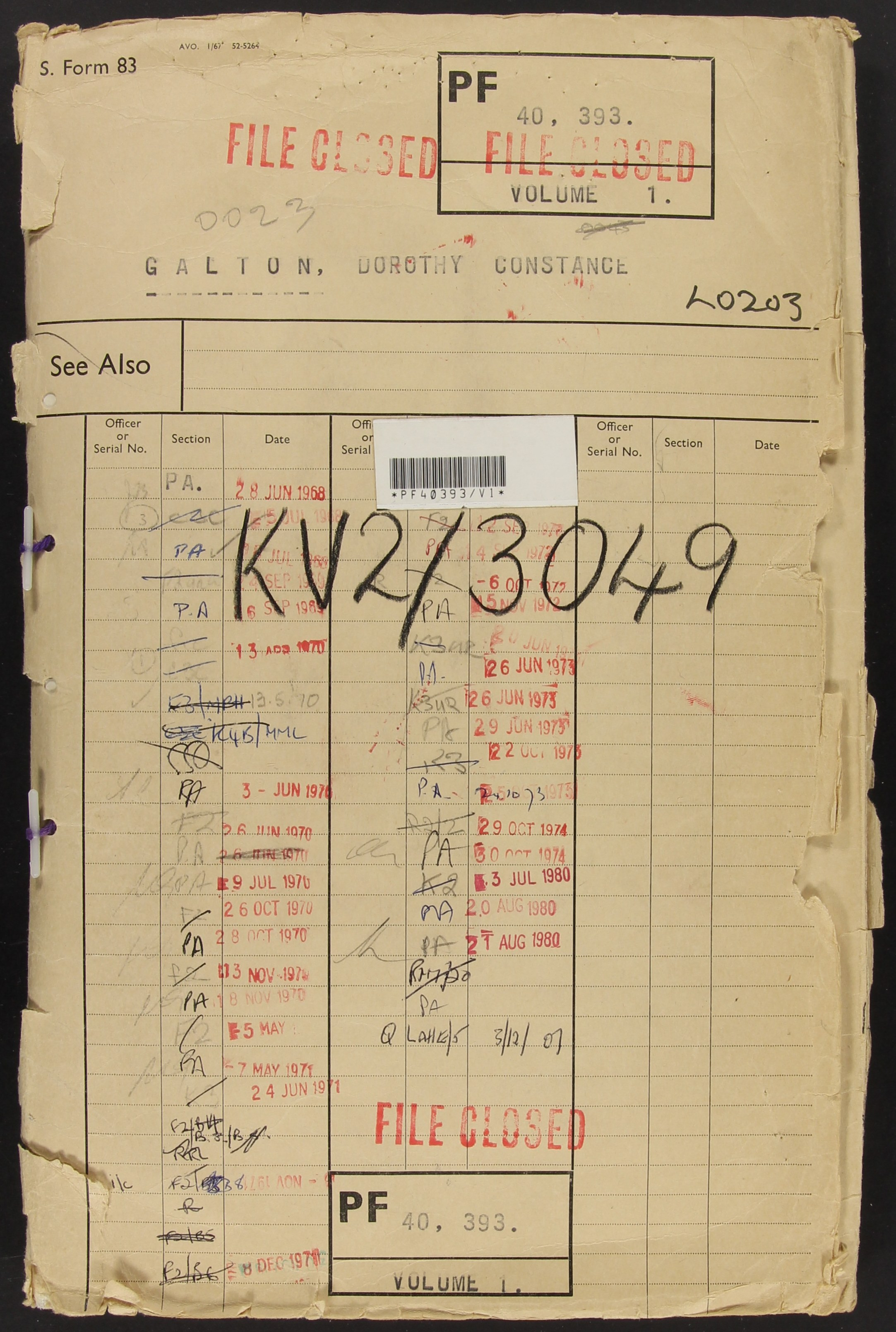
The cover of Dorothy Galton's security services file at the British National Archives

From 1932 to 1936, Galton was an active member of the Communist Party of Great Britain in the St Pancras branch. In August 1934 she visited Leningrad on the SS Sibier and made an additional visit in 1935–36 with Bernard Pares who wrote it up in Moscow admits a critic (1936). From 1936, however, she stopped her political work in favour of "special research work", apparently on the orders of senior party officials. The British security services continued to monitor Galton throughout the 1930s, reporting in their files on her movements, contacts, correspondence and telephone calls which they intercepted.

== Second World War ==
During the Second World War, SSEES was partly moved to Oxford to avoid the bombing of London. Galton remained in London in the school's temporary home at 1 Thornhaugh Street. When that building was hit by a bomb on the night of 10–11 May 1941, all the school's administrative records were destroyed but "by good fortune" Galton had a list of the names and addresses of all the staff and students at home. In 1941, Galton organised a Slavonic studies summer school in Oxford that was attended by 78 students. The summer schools continued in various location in Britain until 1950 when the last one was held in Paris. It is not clear whether Galton organised them all. From May to July 1945 she toured American universities following an invitation from the Rockefeller Foundation and subsequently prepared a report for them on the state of Slavic studies in the universities of the United States, the manuscript of which is held in the SSEES library along with a 59-page diary of her trip.

In August 1942, British police of Special Branch made "discreet inquiries" around Galton's home in Hampstead, which they noted was an area "which is well populated with persons of communist type and sympathies". Reports stated that she was 5 ft 8ins or 9ins tall, and "well built and athletic, fresh complexion, dark bobbed hair, oval face, sharp features, wears spectacles, wears no hat".

The MI6 double agent Kim Philby, who was also working for the Russians, enquired what the British Security Services knew about Galton. According to Philby, the FBI thought that Galton had been "instrumental in effecting reconciliation" between Josef Stalin and Sir Bernard Pares. Roger Hollis, later director general of MI5 and also suspected by some of having been a Russian spy, wrote to Philby detailing Galton's visits to Russia in 1934 and with Pares in 1935–1936. He stated that Galton had been told by a Communist Party superior in 1936 to stop her political work in favour of "special research work". In September 1946, MI5 wrote again to Philby saying that in their opinion the FBI should ignore Pares and pay attention to Galton instead.

== Post-war ==
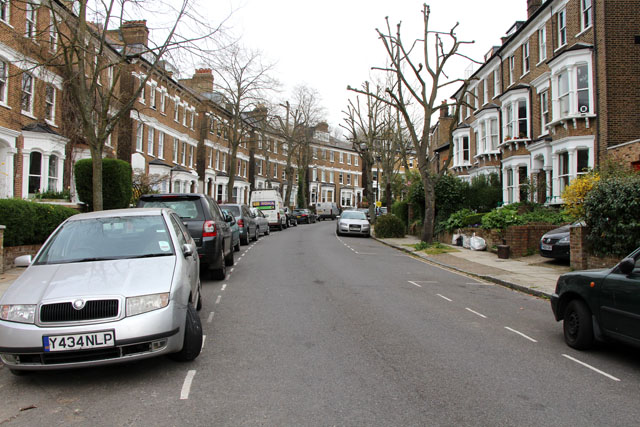
A modern view of South Hill Park Gardens, Hampstead, where Galton lived in the 1940s

Galton remained an object of interest to the British security services in the post-war years. In February 1947, they noted that the mathematician, professor Hyman Levy, described by the security services as a "well known communist" had moved in with Galton at her home at 15 South Hill Park Gardens, Hampstead. Also in 1947, she was involved in the Joint Services School of Languages which caused some concern in official channels given Galton's political views. Through the interception of Galton's mail, which continued until 1952, they learned that she had rejoined the Communist Party of Great Britain in 1950.

In April 1952, Galton's father died. Her mother died in February 1953 and around this time she seems to have come into some money. The security services noted that she had acquired a cottage near Windsor and "She goes down to it every weekend on her mini-motorcycle." Later they noted that she was moving to a cottage in Parndon, Essex, which was part-owned by her brother-in-law, Albert Evans, the Labour Party member of Parliament for South West Islington, and she had "disposed of her motor-scooter and invested in a car."

Despite the long-running suspicions of the security services that Galton was a Russian spy or at least a plant of the Communist Party of Great Britain, they were never able to prove anything.

== Character ==
Opinions were divided over Galton's character. She was described by Karl Showler of the International Bee Research Association as having a gift for languages and administration, and a "warm personality", and by an MI5 informant as "a most unpleasant and seriously unbalanced woman and ... by no means efficient". She was described in The Times as "formidable" and "autocratic" but also having many friends and willing to help those in need. Olga Crisp, a former student at SSEES, described Galton as shy and forthright and avoiding eye-contact. Galton told Crisp, an exile from Poland, that she thought it was Crisp's duty to return to Poland but as she was clearly determined to stay in Britain, she would do what she could to help her, which she did.

== Retirement and death ==
Galton retired from SSEES in December 1961. She was replaced by former army officer and alumnus of SSEES, Ronald Whitworth. She spent her retirement in Norfolk and devoted herself to the study of beekeeping, particularly in Russia, an interest that she first developed in the 1950s. In 1971 the Bee Research Association published her book A survey of a thousand years of beekeeping in Russia, with a foreword by Professor Robert E.F. Smith. In 1987, The International Bee Research Association awarded her honorary membership. Her second book, The bee-hive: An enquiry into its origin and history (1982) theorised a "civilisation of the bee" which she thought contributed to the development of the languages of Eurasia. Her finally work, Bees, honey and beeswax in early historical times, was completed not long before her death but unpublished and the manuscript of it is now lost.

Galton was active in her local Labour Party branch, travelled to Russia, and taught English at the University of Budapest. In 1972 she had a letter published in The Times from her home at Garden House, Peacock Lane, Holt, Norfolk, in which she condemned proposed changes to the status of SSEES as another example of "the distasteful, competitive world in which we have to live." At the age of nearly 90, she who had never owned a home or had a bank account because she considered interest immoral, inherited a property and a sum of money and had to learn to manage both.

Dorothy Galton died at her home, 3 Hooks Hill Road, Sheringham, Norfolk, on 27 August 1992. She had been suffering from stomach cancer. She donated her body to medical research. She did not marry and left no descendants.

== Papers ==
Papers relating to Dorothy Galton are held at the SSEES library as the Galton Collection. Records relating to the surveillance of Galton by the British security services are held at the British National Archives, amounting to over 280 pages and covering the period from 1925 to 1952.

== Selected publications ==
=== Articles ===
- "Sir Bernard Pares and Slavonic Studies in London University, 1919–1939", Slavonic and East European Review, Vol. 46, No. 107, 1968, pp. 481–492.
- "Norman Brooke Jopson 1890–1969", Slavonic and East European Review, Vol. 47, No. 109, 1969, pp. 303–307. (With Robert Auty)
- "The Anglo-Russian literary society", Slavonic and East European Review, Vol. 48, No. 110, 1970, pp. 272–282.
- "Beeswax as an import in medieval England", Bee World, Vol. 52, No. 2, 1971, pp. 68–74.

=== Books ===
- Survey of a thousand years of beekeeping in Russia. Bee Research Association, Chalfont St. Peter, 1971. ISBN 0900149000
- The bee-hive: An enquiry into its origin and history. D. Galton, Sheringham, 1982.

=== Other ===
- A report on Slavic studies in the universities of the United States made to the Rockefeller Foundation, July 1945. London, 1945.
- A guide to translations of Pushkin's verse into English. School of Slavonic and East European Studies, London, 1955.
- Some notes for the history of the School of Slavonic Studies by Dorothy Galton. School of Slavonic and East European Studies, London, 1981. 21 pp.

=== Translations ===
- Faguet, Émile. (1928) Politicians & moralists of the nineteenth century. London: Ernest Benn. (Library of European Political Thought) (Translated from the French language, Politiques et moralistes du XIXe siècle)
