= London Reform Union =

Political organization in London

The London Reform Union (LRU) was a campaigning group of the Progressive Party by which it was founded in 1892. It was also closely associated with the Fabian Society and the LRU's extensive output of pamphlets and propaganda bore a close resemblance to Fabian Tracts.

The first president was the Earl of Rosebery followed by Ben Cooper (Cigar Makers Union) and the first secretary was Tom Mann. The second secretary in 1898 was Frank Wallace Galton.
