= National Labour Federation (UK) =

Former trade union of the United Kingdom

The National Labour Federation (NLF) was a general union representing workers in the United Kingdom.

The union was founded in 1886 by Edward R. Pease of the Fabian Society, and some members of the Amalgamated Society of Engineers. It was launched with a conference in Newcastle-upon-Tyne, permitting workers of any trade to join, and any other unions to affiliate. By 1890, it had more than 60,000 members, with a particular strength in Kingston-upon-Hull, with 3,000 workers there alone.

After 1891, membership began to drop rapidly, falling to just 6,000 in 1892. A major defeat in a strike in Hull led members there to split away and form the Hull and District Labour Federation, while one of its affiliates, the Tyneside and District Labourers' Union reconstituted itself as the National Amalgamated Union of Labour and recruited many of the NLF's former members.

The union dissolved in 1894.
