= F. Lawson Dodd =

Frederick Lawson Dodd (1868 – 1962) was a Fabian dentist and author.

It was he who first proposed the establishment of the Fabian Summer Schools in 1907. A management committee of 12 was formed to run the schools, which Dodd chaired. The first schools took place in an unfurnished house in Llanbedr and they ran for decades. Dodd handled the administration, installed furniture in the house and Mabel Atkinson arranged the educational programme. Fees for the school were 35s. a week with an extra charge for Swiss drill classes. The first school was in August 1907 and made a profit of £200. Some of the students slept outside in the open air. In 1908 an additional house was rented. 2000 people attended in the first four years.

== Works ==
- The problem of the milk-supply 1904
- Municipal Milk and Public Health, Fabian Tract no 122. 1905
- A National Medical Service, Fabian Tract no 160. 1911

Party political offices
Preceded by Hubert Bland	Treasurer of the Fabian Society; 1911–1936	Succeeded by Emil Davies
