= Edward R. Pease =

English writer

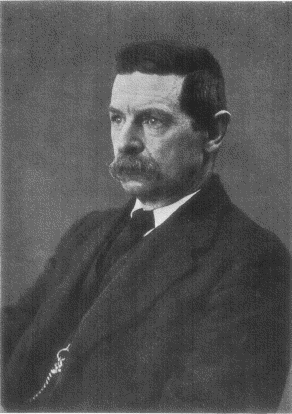
- Edward R. Pease in 1913
- Born: Edward Reynolds Pease; 23 December 1857 near Bristol, England
- Died: 5 January 1955 (aged 97)
- Spouse: Marjory Davidson

Edward Reynolds Pease (23 December 1857 – 5 January 1955) was an English writer and a founding member of the Fabian Society.

== Early life ==
Pease was born near Bristol, the son of devout Quakers, Thomas Pease (1816–1884) and Susanna Ann Fry (1829–1917; sister of Edward Fry, the judge); he was the sixth of Thomas's 15 children but Susanna's first, Thomas having had five children by previous marriages. One of his sisters was the schoolteacher Marian Pease. His father had been a wool comber and his mother came from the Fry family known for manufacturing chocolate. Edward Pease was educated at home until he was 16, and soon after moved to London where he was taken under the wing of his brother in law Sir Thomas Hanbury. He was initially employed as a clerk in a business where Hanbury was a partner. In time Hanbury arranged for him to become a partner in a stock broking firm.

== Career ==
In the early 1880s Pease became friends with Frank Podmore and husband and wife Edith Nesbit and Hubert Bland. On 4 January 1884, Podmore's group founded the Fabian Society.

In 1886, the death of a wealthy relative meant Pease received a sizeable legacy allowing him to give up work at the London Stock Exchange and devote time to his socialist interests. In 1886, he moved to Newcastle-upon-Tyne, began working as a cabinet-maker and formed the National Labour Federation, a general union with a national scope. However, his attempts to convert the working class to socialism were unsuccessful so he returned to London. He travelled to United States with Sidney Webb in 1888, and on his return married Marjory Davidson, a young Scottish schoolteacher.

In 1890 Pease was appointed secretary of the Fabian Society. As well as managing the society's administration, he edited Fabian News and wrote ten pamphlets, including tracts on liquor licensing (1899) and The History of the Fabian Society (1916).

With Sidney and Beatrice Webb, Pease was a trustee in the fund used to found the London School of Economics (LSE) in 1895.

Pease was also a member of the Independent Labour Party and in February 1900 he represented the Fabian Society at the meeting where it was decided to establish "a distinct Labour group in Parliament", forming the Labour Representation Committee (LRC - the forerunner to the Labour Party) to which Pease was elected, serving on the Party's executive committee for 14 years.

== Family ==
Pease married Mary (Marjory) Gammell Davidson (1861–1950). They had two children: Michael S. Pease, the geneticist, and Nicholas Arthington Pease.

With his wife Marjory, Pease established the East Surrey Labour Party and both served on the local council. Their home at Limpsfield, The Pendicle, Pastens Road, became known as 'Dostoevsky Corner', because he housed so many Russian refugees who had been forced to leave their country because of their socialist beliefs.

== See also ==
- List of Fabian Tracts

Party political offices
Preceded by New position	General Secretary of the Fabian Society; 1891 – 1913	Succeeded by William Sanders
Preceded by William Sanders	Acting General Secretary of the Fabian Society; 1915 – 1919	Succeeded by F. W. Galton
