= Rosamund Edith Nesbit Bland =

English author

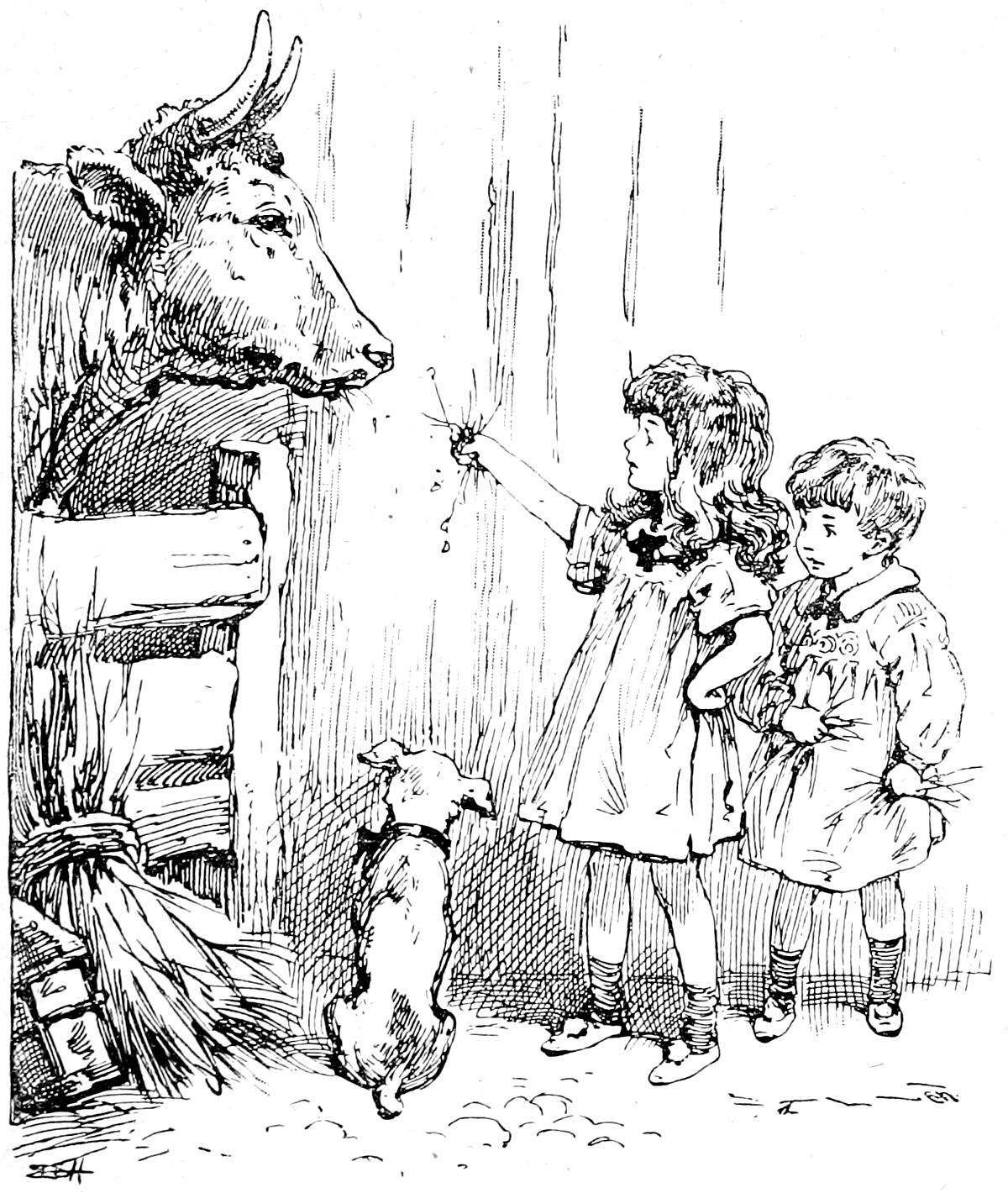
An illustration from the children's book Moo-Cow Tales by Rosamund Bland

Rosamund Edith Nesbit Bland (1886–1950) was an English author and the adopted daughter of Edith Nesbit. She was the author of the novel The Man in the Stone House (1934) and the co-author of Cat's Tales, a children's book she co-wrote with Nesbit.

== Early life ==
Rosamund Bland was born in England in 1886. Her parents were Alice Hoatson and Hubert Bland, the husband of Edith Nesbit. Hoatson joined Bland and Nesbit's household after she became pregnant with Rosamund. Reportedly devastated by a recent stillbirth, Nesbit agreed to raise Rosamund as her own.

Bland's brother, John, was born in 1899. John Bland was also the child of Hoatson and Hubert Bland.

== Literary career ==
In 1934, Bland's novel The Man in the Stone House, about a teenage girl breaking free from the limitations of her conservative upbringing, was published. Bland also wrote several children's books, including Moo-Cow Tales. The book Cat's Tales was co-authored by Bland and Nesbit.

== Personal life ==
Bland reportedly had a relationship with H.G. Wells while she was a teenager. Bland and Wells were reportedly prevented from eloping by Bland's father. She also had a long relationship with Alfred Richard Orage, and in 1909, married Orage's friend Clifford Sharp. Some scholars speculate that the marriage was motivated by a desire to outwardly conform to social convention.

In 1921, Bland began a relationship with Russian esotericist P.D. Ouspenskii, whom she had met through Orage. Bland soon began working as Ouspenskii's secretary. She was also connected with Armenian philosopher G.I. Gurdjieff during the 1920s.

== In popular culture ==
English actress Rosalyn Landor portrayed Bland in an episode of the television series The Edwardians titled E.Nesbit (1972), about the life of Edith Nesbit.
