= Marjorie Pease =

British politician

Pease in 1922

Mary Gammell Pease (11 December 1861 – 23 February 1950), known as Marjorie Pease, was a British politician.

Born Mary Gammell Davidson in Kinfauns in Perthshire, she was educated at Cheltenham Ladies College, where she qualified as a teacher. She then worked at several schools in London where she joined the Fabian Society in 1886. Through the society, she met Edward R. Pease and the two married in 1889. At this time Mary adopted the first name "Marjorie".

After marrying, Pease worked as an assistant to her husband who was the secretary of the Fabians. In the early 1900s she formed a women's Liberal Party group for Oxted and Limpsfield in Surrey, where she was then living. In 1907, she formed a Kent and Sussex branch of the Land Club League, which later became part of the Land and Home League, with Pease as its honorary secretary.

In 1911, Pease was elected to Godstone Rural District Council and successfully campaigned for the council to become one of the first to build municipal housing. She also became a magistrate and sat on numerous local committees. In 1918, she left the Liberals and joined the Labour Party. She stood for her new party in East Surrey at the 1922 United Kingdom general election. She was not elected and thereafter devoted her time to the Fabians, with a particular focus on local government matters.
