= Showler =

Showler is a surname. Notable people with the surname include:

- Paul Showler (born 1966), English footballer and physiotherapist
- Karl Showler (1932–2022), British beekeeper and writer

== See also ==
- Shower (surname)
