= Clifford Sharp =

British journalist

Clifford Dyce Sharp (1883–1935) was a British journalist. He was the first editor of the New Statesman magazine from its foundation in 1913 until 1928; a left-wing magazine founded by Sidney and Beatrice Webb and other members of the socialist Fabian Society. He had previously edited The Crusade.

In World War I he was a "fierce opponent" of the war and was so irksome to the Government that David Lloyd George personally arranged his conscription into the Royal Artillery. He was rescued by recruitment to the Foreign Office, and was sent to neutral Sweden, in association with Arthur Ransome.

In 1909 Sharp married Rosamund Bland, who was the adopted daughter of Edith Nesbit, the author of The Railway Children, and the natural daughter of Nesbit's husband Hubert Bland.

== Notes ==
Media offices
Preceded by —	Editor of the New Statesman; 1913–1928	Succeeded by Charles Mostyn Lloyd
