= Albert Emil Davies =

British politician and writer

Albert Emil Davies (16 November 1875 – 18 July 1950) was a British politician and writer.

Born in London, Davies became active in the Fabian Society. There, he was the most vocal advocate of nationalisation, his early works including The Nationalisation of Railways and State Purchase of Railways. In 1911, he was elected to the executive of the Fabian Society, and his 1914 book The State in Business brought him to wider public attention. In 1913, he became City Editor of the New Statesman, holding the post until 1931.

Davies was appointed to London County Council as a Labour Party alderman in 1919, and devoted much of his life to the body. He was its deputy chairman in 1926/7, vice-chairman in 1937/8, and finally chaired the council in 1940/1. He also stood for Parliament, unsuccessfully contesting Romford at the 1922, 1923 and 1924 United Kingdom general elections, and Manchester Moss Side at the 1931 general election. He served on a large number of committees, and chaired the Labour Party's Advisory Committee on Finance and Commerce from 1924 until 1931. He remained active with the Fabians, and served as the society's honorary treasurer from 1936 until 1947.

During World War II, Davies undertook a lengthy speaking tour of North America, on behalf of the Ministry of Information. After the war, he spent some time as an honorary lecturer in business economics at the University of Leeds.

Davies married Alice Berry in 1898. Later in life, he had a long-term relationship with Dorothy Evans. In total, he had five children, who included the Labour MP Ernest Davies.

Civic offices
Preceded by Eveline Lowe	Chairman of the London County Council; 1940–1941	Succeeded by Charles Ammon
Party political offices
Preceded by Harry Gosling	Leader of the Labour Party on London County Council; 1924–1925	Succeeded by Herbert Morrison
Preceded by F. Lawson Dodd	Treasurer of the Fabian Society; 1936–1947	Succeeded by Ian Mikardo
