= Julius West =

Russian historian

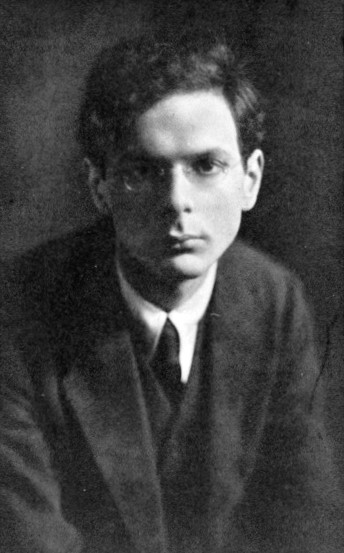
Julius West

Julius West (born Julius Rappoport) (21 March 1891 – 1918) was a historian, poet, and translator who prepared a Fabian Tract on John Stuart Mill and a critical study of G. K. Chesterton. He translated Chekhov into English and produced a number of other works including a history of Chartism that was published posthumously. He travelled to Russia at the time of the 1917 revolution and saw Lenin and Trotsky speak.

== Early life and career ==
Julius West was born Julius Rappoport in St. Petersburg on 21 March (9th O.S.), 1891, to Semon and Fanny Rappoport. His father was a correspondent for Russian papers. The family travelled to London when Julius was only two months old. His father was Jewish but Julius was later confirmed in the Church of England and at some point changed his name to the more English sounding "West". He was educated at the Haberdashers' Aske's Boys' School in Hampstead from the age of 12.

At the time of the British 1901 census, the family were living at Sumatra Road, Hampstead. Julius had a sister, Anne M. Rappoport. By 1911, West was living at 24 Gordon Mansions, St. Pancras, London, and his occupation was shown as "librarian and clerk student [London University]". He is shown as single and working for a "political organization".

West worked as a temporary clerk in the Board of Trade in London, preparing a report on the cost of living in Germany, after which he clerked at the Fabian Society. In 1913 he worked for the New Statesman for a few months.

== First World War ==
Around August 1914, West tried to obtain a commission in the British Army but was refused on the grounds that he was a Russian citizen. He argued that his parents, who were Russian, had only been visiting Russia when he was born, but it made no difference. He attempted to become a naturalised British citizen but it is unclear if he succeeded. The British authorities told him that if he wanted to fight he would have to join the Russian army who were allied to the British in the war. This he would not do as he considered himself English and his Russian was poor. He was, however, allowed to join an ambulance corps in London.

On 2 September 1914, West married Ruth Giles, the daughter of an English clergyman. The couple wished to marry urgently as West was soon to travel to Russia but, according to the priest who officiated, the so-called "pacifist bishop" Edward Hicks, Giles's mother and sister were "vehement feminists" who wished to omit the word "obey" from the marriage vows while West's father would not attend the ceremony if they did. A compromise was reached whereby "obey" and "giving away" were omitted and West's father remained in the vestry.

Towards the end of 1914, he travelled to Petrograd, Moscow, and Warsaw as a correspondent. On his return to England he wrote and edited Everyman. After his wife died in early 1917, he travelled again to Russia for the start of the Bolshevik regime where he experienced famine conditions in Petrograd which affected his already poor health. He attended Bolshevik meetings at which Lenin and Trotsky spoke and came under suspicion as a possible spy. In February 1918, he escaped Russia with a party of English governesses and elderly invalids who travelled over ice through German lines. The party spent a night in Åland guarded by German troops. West arrived back in England via Stockholm.

== Death and legacy ==
After his return to England, West was asked to travel as a correspondent to Switzerland, which he did, but he returned in a very poor state of health. He spent time at a hotel in Surrey and at a sanatorium in the Mendip Hills, but his health did not improve and he died of a complication of influenza and pneumonia in 1918. His book on Chartism was completed by J. C. Squire and published in 1920 with an introductory biographical note about West.

== See also ==
- Mark Hovell

== Selected publications ==
=== Non fiction ===
- John Stuart Mill. Fabian Society, London, 1913. (Fabian Tract No. 168)
- G. K. Chesterton: A critical study. Martin Secker, 1915.
- Soldiers of the Tsar and other sketches and studies of the Russia of today. Iris Publishing Company, London, 1915.
- The fountain; or, the De Pootkins family at home and abroad. An initiation into the secrets of the literary trade. Iris Publishing, London, 1916.
- The Russian revolution and British democracy. Fabian Society, London, 1917. (Fabian Tract No. 184)
- A history of the Chartist movement. Constable, London, 1920. (Completed by J.C. Squire)

=== Poetry ===
- Atlantis, and other poems. David Nutt, London, 1913.

=== Translations ===
Chekhov:

- The three sisters
- The cherry orchard
- The proposal
- On the High Road
