= Hyman Levy =

Scottish-Jewish mathematician and philosopher (1889–1975)

Hyman Levy FRSE (28 February 1889 – 27 February 1975) (Note: Who's Who records his birth date as 7 March 1889. See "LEVY, Hyman". Who's Who & Who Was Who. Vol. 2023 (online ed.). A & C Black. (Subscription or UK public library membership required.)) was a Scottish-Jewish mathematician, philosopher, author, political activist, and fellow of the Royal Society of Edinburgh. For many years he taught mathematics at Imperial College London, eventually retiring as Emeritus Professor.

== Life ==
Hyman Levy was born into an orthodox Jewish family in Scotland in 1889. He was the third oldest of eight children of Minna Cohen and Marcus Levy. His father was a picture-framer and occasional art dealer in Edinburgh. The family lived at 70 Bristo Street in Edinburgh's South Side.

Levy attended George Heriot's School a short distance from his family home, and was named the school Dux in 1907. He studied mathematics at Edinburgh University. His leftist politics were evident early when he declined a chance for further study at Cambridge University—on account of what he considered its complicity in Britain's class system—and instead chose to pursue mathematical research at the University of Göttingen in Germany. At the outbreak of World War I, Levy returned to Britain. In 1916 he joined the Royal Flying Corps. It is unclear if he saw active service, but the experience inspired an interest in aerodynamics.

In 1916 he was elected a Fellow of the Royal Society of Edinburgh. His proposers were Cargill Gilston Knott, Edmund Taylor Whittaker, James Robert Milne and George Alexander Carse.

In 1918 he married Marion Aitken Fraser, a devout Presbyterian, which led to a rupture with his family who disapproved of the interfaith marriage. The couple had a daughter and two sons.

Levy researched aeronautics at the National Physical Laboratory (NPL). He published papers and books on the subject, including Aeronautics in Theory and Experiment (1918), which was called "perhaps the earliest text covering, at advanced level, the whole theory of aeroplane design and operation." After leaving NPL, he became a professor of mathematics at the Royal College of Science, Imperial College London, where he later served as head of the mathematics department, and subsequently became dean of the Royal College itself.

Levy's main areas of mathematical specialization were in numerical methods, numerical solutions of differential equations, finite difference equations and statistics. Among his important books were Numerical Studies in Differential Equations (1934), Elements of Probability (1936), and Finite Difference Equations (1959). He also made contributions to number theory, including a 1963 paper comparing Lemoine's conjecture to Goldbach's weak conjecture.

Levy was in the Labour Party from 1920 to 1931. He then joined the Communist Party of Great Britain (CPGB), and was a loyal member for 25 years. In 1956 he travelled to the Soviet Union and was appalled by what he regarded as the mistreatment of Russian-Jewish writers, artists and intellectuals. He published a scathing article on the subject in January 1957, and then followed that with a book, Jews and the National Question. He was condemned by CPGB leadership for his "departure from Marxism", culminating in his expulsion from the Party in 1958.

Hyman Levy died in Wimbledon, London on 27 February 1975, one day before his 86th birthday.

== Selected bibliography ==
- Aeronautics in Theory and Experiment, co-authored with William Lewis Cowley. London: E. Arnold (1918); OCLC 247882.
- Practical Mathematical Analysis, by H. von Sanden ... with examples by the translator, H. Levy. New York: E. P. Dutton & Co. (1924); OCLC 3145545.
- The Universe of Science. London: Watts (1932); OCLC 2989424.
- Science in an irrational society. London: Watts (1934); OCLC 8278279.
- The web of thought and action. London: Watts (1934); OCLC 1899779.
- Aspects of Dialectical Materialism, co-authored with Ralph Winston Fox, John Macmurray, R. Page Arnot, J. D. Bernal and E. F. Carritt. London: Watts (1934); OCLC 5153156.
- Numerical Studies in Differential Equations, co-authored with Edward Albert Baggott. London: Watts (1934); LCCN 34-40900.
- Modern Engineering Theory & Practice, co-authored with Bailey Levy; Odhams Press Ltd (1935); ASIN B000R7AJPW.
- Elements of Probability, co-authored with Leonard Roth. Oxford: The Clarendon Press (1936); LCCN 37-10467.
- A Philosophy for a Modern Man; Alfred A. Knopf (1938); ASIN B0006DA3US.
- Modern Science – A Study of Physical Science in the World Today, Hamish Hamilton (1939); ASIN B00085G0RO.
- Science: Curse Or Blessing?, London: Watts & Co. (1940); ASIN B0026OCT8O.
- Elementary Mathematics, London: Thomas Nelson & Sons (1942); ASIN B0007DT7RC.
- Soviet Jews at war, pamphlet, Russia Today Society (1943); ASIN B00KBTLNDI.
- Elementary Statistics, co-authored with Edward Ernest Preidel. London: Thomas Nelson & Sons (1944); OCLC 4027740.
- Social Thinking, Cobbett Press (1945); ASIN B0014KNTQW.
- Literature for an age of science, co-authored with Helen Spalding. London: Methuen (1952); OCLC 5357029
- Jews and the National Question, London: Hillway Pub. Co. (1958); OCLC 5365616.
- Finite Difference Equations, co-authored with F. Lessman; London: Pitman (1959); LCCN 59-4065.

== See also ==
- Dorothy Galton
