= Mark Hovell =

English historian

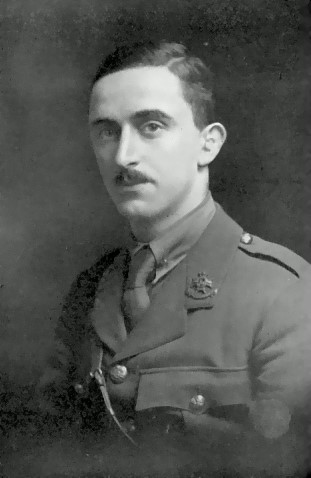
- Born: 21 March 1888; Manchester, England
- Died: 12 August 1916 (aged 28); France
- Burial place: Vermelles British Cemetery
- Alma mater: Victoria University of Manchester
- Spouse: Fanny Gatley
- Military career
- Commands: The Sherwood Foresters
- Conflicts: First World War: Battle of the Somme

Mark Hovell (21 March 1888 – 12 August 1916) was a British military historian. He was a lecturer in history at the Victoria University of Manchester and the Workers Educational Association. He was an officer in The Sherwood Foresters during the First World War and was killed in action in only his second time in the trenches, after he fell down a shaft which had been used to explode a mine under the German lines. His book on Chartism, which he had begun before the war, was completed and published posthumously in 1918. It was one of the first scholarly works on the subject and one of the first to have been written by someone who was not a first-hand witness to events.

== Early life ==
Mark Hovell was born in Manchester on 21 March 1888, the son of William and Hannah Hovell, of Brooklands, Cheshire, apparently in humble circumstances. He won a scholarship to the Manchester Grammar School at the age of ten. Circumstances forced him to leave school to work at age 12 but he returned in August 1901 as a pupil-teacher at Moston Lane Municipal School. Overcoming serious illness, he won the Hulme Scholarship to the Victoria University of Manchester in June 1906 and enrolled as a history undergraduate that October. He graduated with a first class degree in 1909. In 1910, he took the Teachers' Diploma.

== Career ==
In 1910, Hovell was appointed assistant lecturer in history at Victoria University of Manchester with special responsibility for the Workers Educational Association (WEA) activities of the university. He took classes in Colne, Ashton and Leigh and won the confidence of his students by walking the moors on a Sunday with them. In the winter of 1913–14 he taught for the WEA in London and impressed his students with his sincere interest in the lot of the common man in the early nineteenth century.

Hovell could have become a Medievalist but his interest in the Napoleonic campaigns, which he studied under Spenser Wilkinson, and his work for the WEA, led instead to specialisms in military history and the social and economic history of the early Victorian age respectively. The latter hardened into a detailed examination of the Chartist Movement. His election to the Langton Fellowship in 1911 provided a small income for three years that allowed him to concentrate on that topic rather than teaching, but throughout this time he continued to struggle to repay the money advanced to him by the Board of Education to fund his earlier studies.

In 1912–13, Hovell spent a year studying and teaching at Karl Lamprecht's institute in Leipzig. Hovell was probably sympathetic to Lamprecht's theory of Kulturgeschichte ("History of Culture") but found his historical ideas idiosyncratic and the students he was asked to teach, uninspired. He enjoyed the social life, however, and witnessed a student duel. He wrote to Thomas Tout that he was generally impressed by the German way of life, but shocked by the hostility to England that he encountered at every turn, despite receiving warm hospitality personally.

Hovell returned to England by August 1913 and continued his researches into Chartism and taught WEA courses. He was appointed as lecturer in military history at the Victoria University, which had introduced the course to prepare its students for commissions in the British Army.

== First World War ==
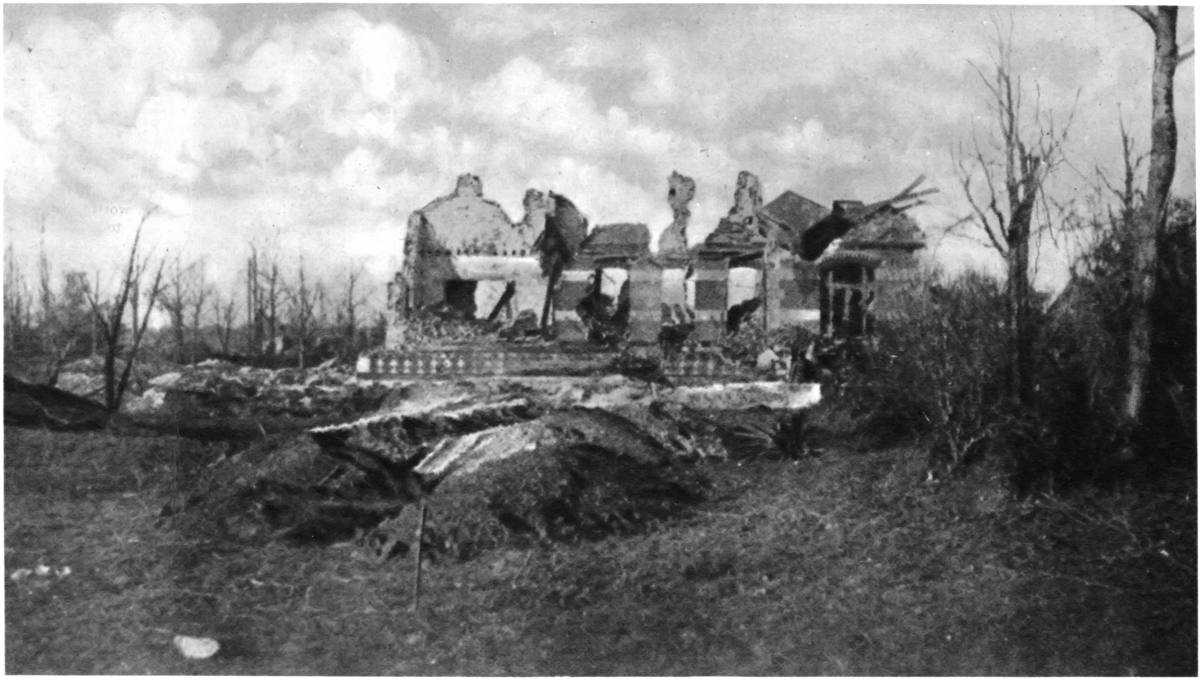
Destruction at Vermelles, December 1914.

Following the outbreak of the First World War, the university's course in military history was downgraded when, as Tout described it, the students swapped theory for practice. Hovell followed in 1915 despite his book nearing completion. He wrote to Tout that "the Chartists are dead and gone, while the Germans are very much alive."

Hovell received basic training at Hornsea and was gazetted to a "Kitchener" battalion of The Sherwood Foresters in August 1915, joining the Nottinghamshire and Derbyshire Regiment as a second lieutenant. There being more junior officers than platoons to command, he was shuffled around to various establishments where he learned drill, spent time at Camberley Staff College and learned musketry at York where he witnessed a Zeppelin raid. Hovell's training and waiting around lasted almost a year during which time he married Fanny Gatley of Sale on 3 June 1916.

After the start of the Battle of the Somme on 1 July 1916, Hovell heard rumours that "officers were being exported by the hundred", presumably to replace casualties, and in early July he was sent to France. Before he went, he made Tout promise to ensure his history of Chartism was published if anything happened to him. He joined a battalion of his regiment in an unnamed small mining village, probably Vermelles in Pas de Calais. The unit had experienced great losses in the fighting on the Somme but he did his best to reconstitute it, becoming an expert in physical training, Bayonet fighting, and map-reading before the unit was sent back to the trenches. On 1 August 1916 he wrote to Tout that:

Behold me at last an officer of a line regiment, and in command of a small fortress, somewhere in France, with a platoon, a gun, stores, and two brother officers temporarily in my charge. I thus become owner of the best dug-out in the line, with a bed (four poles and a piece of stretched canvas), a table, and a ceiling ten feet thick. We are in the third line at present, so life is very quiet. Our worst enemies are rats, mice, beetles, and mosquitoes.

== Death ==
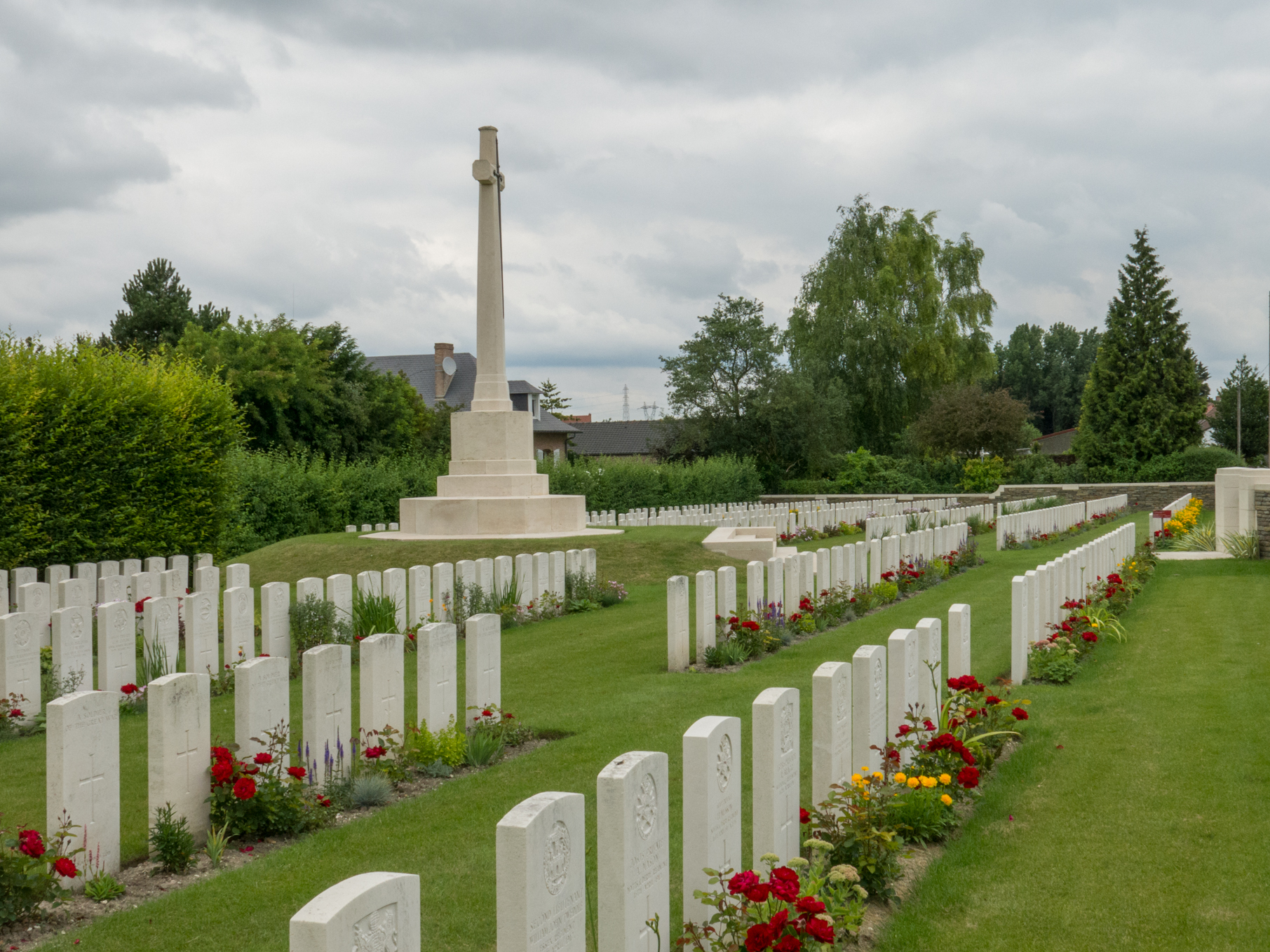
Vermelles British Cemetery

Hovell died in the evening of 12 August 1916 after going to the aid of a soldier who had been overcome by fumes from a shaft which had been used to explode a mine under the German trenches. Hovell's comrades believed that he too was overcome, causing him to fall into the shaft to his death. He was buried nearby at Vermelles; the service conducted by the regimental chaplain the Rev. T. Eaton McCormick, who coincidentally was also the vicar of Hovell's parish in England. McCormick wrote to Hovell's mother that just as he spoke the words "earth to earth", "all the surrounding batteries of our artillery burst forth into a tremendous roar in a fresh attack upon the German line ... He has, as the soldiers say, "gone West" in a blaze of glory." He is remembered at Vermelles British Cemetery at grave number 1112. His daughter, Marjorie, was born on 26 March 1917.

== Legacy ==
After Hovell's death, the incomplete "rough draft" of his book on Chartism was placed in the hands of Thomas Tout by Fanny Hovell. The first part was substantially complete, however, the later sections were less finished and Hovell's manuscript stopped in 1842. Tout sought opinions at the university and sent the manuscript to Julius West whose own A history of the Chartist Movement was in preparation and who discovered that his conclusions were broadly the same as those of Hovell. In an odd coincidence, West also died prematurely, of a complication of influenza and pneumonia in 1918, and his book also had to be completed by another author, in his case J.C. Squire, before being published in 1920.

Tout wrote a preface, an introduction which consists of a biographical sketch of Hovell, and the concluding chapter which took the story from the failure of the charter in 1842 to the last days of Chartism in the 1850s. The book was published by the Victoria University in 1918. It was one of the first scholarly works on the subject, and the first major work on Chartism written by someone who was not a first-hand witness to events.

== Publications ==
- The Chartist movement. University Press, Manchester, 1918. (Completed and edited by T.F. Tout) (Historical Series No. XXXI) (2nd 1925, 3rd 1966 with a bibliographical introduction by W.H. Chaloner)
