= Iris Publishing Company =

British publishing company

The Iris Publishing Company were a small publishing company located at 30 and 31 Furnival Street, London, in the late nineteenth century and the early years of the twentieth century. They were associated with The Chichester Press and specialised in publishing translations of foreign language works into English.

== People ==
The founder of the firm was Andree de Keyser. The manager was her husband, the composer Alfred Ignace de Keyser (born 1872), of 16 Carleton Road, Tufnell Park, London, who died while holidaying in Bournemouth in 1917 after which the Iris Publishing Company appears to have ceased in business. Alfred is buried at the Wimborne Road Cemetery in Bournemouth where a large monument exists to his memory. Andree de Keyser died in France at Montorel Ingrandes-sur-Loire in 1945.

== Selected titles ==
- Lezinsky, David Lesser. (1894) Daniel, Daddy, Ruth and company.
- de Weerdt, Raymond Colleye. (1915) The spider's web, an exposition of the origin, growth and methods of German 'world-power' madness, with special reference to Belgium.
- West, Julius. (1915) Soldiers of the Tsar and other sketches and studies of the Russia of today.
- Izumo, Takeda. (1916) The pine-tree (Matsu) a drama adapted from the Japanese.
- Laurent, Lea. (1916) Our lady of Belgium (Notre dame de Belgique). (Trans. Elisabeth M. Lockwood)
- West, Julius. (1916) The fountain; or, the De Pootkins family at home and abroad. An initiation into the secrets of the literary trade.
