= Leveson Francis Vernon-Harcourt =

British civil engineer (1839-1907)

- Born: 25 January 1839
- Died: September 14, 1907 (aged 68); Swanage
- Citizenship: British
- Education: Balliol College, Oxford
- Occupation: Civil engineer

Leveson Francis Vernon-Harcourt M.I.C.E. (25 January 1839 – 14 September 1907) was a British civil engineer, author of several treatises on river and harbour engineering.

== Early life and education ==
Leveson Francis Vernon-Harcourt was the son of Admiral Frederick Edward Vernon-Harcourt (1790–1883), a descendant of the Barons Vernon, and his wife, Marcia Delap (née Tollemache) (1802–1868). His elder brother was the chemist Augustus George Vernon Harcourt.

Vernon-Harcourt was educated at Windlesham House School, Harrow School and Balliol College, Oxford, graduating in 1861 with a first-class degree in mathematics and natural sciences. He received his training in engineering as a pupil of Sir John Hawkshaw.

== Career ==
Vernon-Harcourt specialised in canal and harbour engineering. He was a pioneer in the use of scale models to predict the impact of man made structures in tidal waters. He was an active contributor to the Institution of Civil Engineers, and the author of several books on civil engineering.

His career included acting as resident engineer for an extension to the West India Docks, London under John Hawkshaw, during the 1860s; superintendent of works at Braye Harbour, and construction of a pier at Rosslare. After 1874 he acted as a consultant engineer, and in 1882 was appointed professor of civil engineering at University College London. On his resignation in 1905 he was elected emeritus professor.

== Publications ==
- Vernon-Harcourt, Leveson Francis (1882). A treatise on rivers and canals relating to the control and improvement of rivers and the design, construction and development of canals. OL 7104722M.
- Vernon-Harcourt, Leveson Francis (1885). Harbours and docks, their physical features, history, construction, equipment, and maintenance, with statistics as to their commercial development. OL 6917798M.
- Vernon-Harcourt, Leveson Francis (1891). Achievements in engineering during the last half century.
- Vernon-Harcourt, Leveson Francis (1896). Rivers and canals: the flow, control and improvement of rivers and the design, construction and development of canals both for navigation and irrigation : with statistics of the traffic on inland waterways.
- Vernon-Harcourt, Leveson Francis (1902). Civil engineering as applied in construction.
- Vernon-Harcourt, Leveson Francis (1907). Sanitary engineering with respect to water-supply and sewage disposal.

== Personal life ==
In 1870 he married Alice Brandreth, daughter of Lt. Col. Henry Rowland Brandreth FRS, with whom he had four children, of which three survived him. His daughter, Evelyn Alice, married the writer Arthur Clutton-Brock in 1903.

Vernon-Harcourt died in 1907 at Swanage. He is buried in Brookwood Cemetery (Plot 36).
