= Local Fabian societies =

There are 45 local Fabian societies in the United Kingdom, aiming to bring Fabian Society debates to communities around the country. Some have continuously existed since the 1890s to the present day.

== General history ==
Most local Fabian societies have risen and fallen over the years. The Fabian local societies were given a substantial boost in World War Two when re-founded by G.D.H. Cole and Margaret Cole, who noted renewed interest in socialism and that wartime evacuation created chances for Fabians to strengthen influence outside London.

== Bournemouth ==
Bournemouth Fabian Society has been in existence since 1892 and as such, is one of the oldest local societies. Beatrice Webb was a key early contributor, having been educated there, and Rupert Brooke. The society has come and gone, with peaks in 1924 (during the first Labour Government) and in World War Two. It fell into abeyance between 1960 and 1966, but re-emerged and has maintained eight monthly meetings until the onset of COVID-19.

== Central London ==
Like other local Fabian societies, the Central London Fabian Society (CLFS) was given a substantial boost during renewed interest in socialism in World War Two. Events included country walks, tea dances and music appreciation sessions. By the 1960s, hundreds of members attended weekly CLFS meetings in Conway Hall and the society contained a 'Science and Technology Circle' which examined Operations Research. The CLFS has been in continuous existence since then. Since the late 2010s it has undergone substantial revival and expansion, sometimes drawing on archival research for inspiration.

== Oxford ==
Founded in 1895, Oxford Fabianism has gone through several phases, being named Oxford University Fabian Society, Oxford City Fabian Society, Oxford Area Fabian Society, and Oxford Fabian Society (its current name). Visiting speakers have included Ramsay Macdonald, Sidney Webb, Rajani Palme Dutt and many more. Oxford Fabians have conducted social research projects over the decades, including into Oxford youth activities, colonial government, and composition of Oxfordshire public boards.

== Research ==
It has long been known that the history of the local Fabian societies has been less investigated than that of the Westminster Fabian Society. In 1962 historian A.M. McBriar observed that it was hard to chart the influence of Fabian local societies as their history was under-researched.

Some local Fabian society archives are held in the London School of Economics archives, largely focusing on the late nineteenth and early twentieth centuries. Researching more recent periods has required using local archives, private collections and oral history interviews.

Since June 2020, the Central London Fabians have been leading research into Fabian local history as part of the 'Fabian Challenge Fund'.
