= William Clarke (Fabian) =

- Born: 22 November 1852; Norwich, England
- Died: 8 May 1901 (aged 48); Mostar, Herzegovina
- Education: University of Cambridge
- Occupations: Socialist activist, Journalist
- Known for: Prominent figure in the Fabian Society

William Clarke (22 November 1852 – 8 May 1901) was a British socialist activist, prominent in the Fabian Society.

Born in Norwich, Clarke worked as a clerk before attending the University of Cambridge. He then worked as a journalist, first for local newspapers, then in London, and as a foreign correspondent for some American publications. This led him to specialise in writing about American politics and literature, and he went on several lecture tours of the United States.

Clarke joined the Fabian Society in 1886, and served on its executive committee from 1888 until 1891, and as one of the society's first trustees. He lectured on "the industrial aspect of socialism", in particular as part of a tour of Lancashire, and this was published as part of the Fabian Essays, the only article in the volume to take an explicitly Marxist approach. He wrote an early history of the society in 1894, published in the American edition of Fabian Essays.

In 1892, the society with which Clarke had invested his savings collapsed, and he lost his money. His health also declined, and he gradually moved away from socialism, resigning from the Fabian Society in 1897. He worked for the Daily Chronicle for much of the decade, but resigned in 1899, on the grounds that he supported the Boers in the Second Boer War. He launched The Progressive Review in 1897, but it did not succeed, and so he instead wrote for The Spectator and The Economist.

Clarke suffered from poor health for many years, relating to diabetes. In 1901 he went on a tour of Herzegovina, dying in Mostar.
