= Frank Wallace Galton =

English political writer and journalist

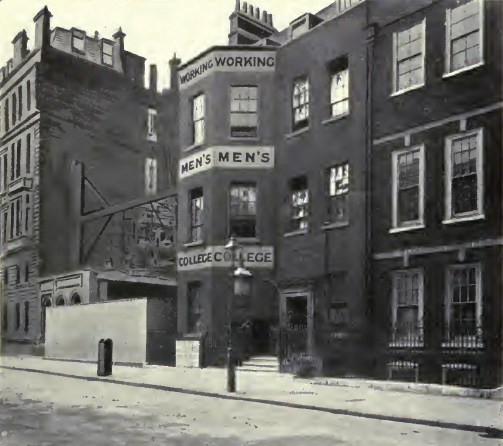
The Working Men's College in Great Ormond Street, London.

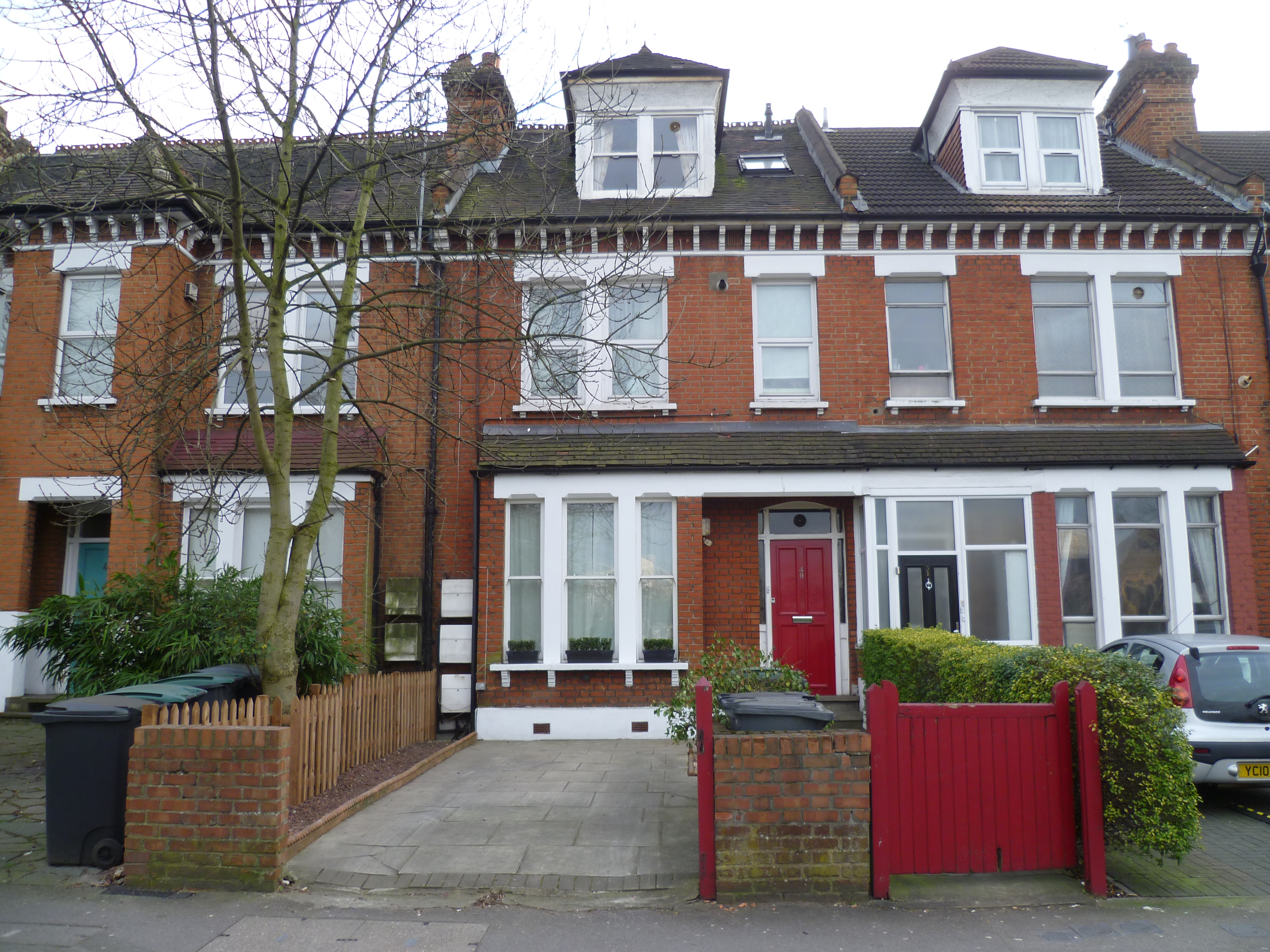
Modern view of Galton's home (centre) in Wood Green, London.

Frank Wallace Galton (2 November 1867 – 9 April 1952), sometimes known as Frank Wallis Galton, was an English political writer and journalist who was secretary to Sidney and Beatrice Webb and later to the Fabian Society. In 1929, he was appointed to the Royal Commission on Transport.

== Early life ==
Frank Galton was born in 1867, in St. Pancras, London. He was educated at a board school and as an adult at the Working Men's College in Great Ormond Street.

== Family ==
Galton married Jessie Jane Townsend Cottridge in 1899 and the couple had two children, Beatrice Jessie Galton, and Dorothy Constance Galton who was born on 14 October 1901 at 66 Rathcoole Avenue, Hornsey, London. At the time of the 1911 census, the family was living at 49 Bounds Green Road, Wood Green, London. Dorothy went on to be administrative secretary of the School of Slavonic and East European Studies in London, and was under some form of surveillance by the British security services for most of her working life as a suspected Russian spy. Beatrice married Albert Evans, the Labour Party member of Parliament for South West Islington. Jessie Galton died in February 1953.

== Career ==
Galton was originally apprentice to a silversmith and engraver in the City of London but left that for journalism and politics. From 1892 to 1898, Galton was secretary to Beatrice and Sidney Webb, and secretary to the London Reform Union from 1898. For some years he was secretary to the City of London Liberal Association. Between 1918 and 1920, he edited the Municipal Journal and he was then appointed secretary of the Fabian Society where he remained until his retirement in 1939.

In 1929, he was appointed to the Royal Commission on Transport.

Galton published little in extended form or under his own name but was a prolific producer of articles, pamphlets and leaflets.

According to The Times, he was a liberal at heart rather than a socialist, and thought to be the model for the character of Henry Straker in George Bernard Shaw's play Man and Superman (1903).

== Death ==
Galton died at his home in Hertfordshire on 9 April 1952.

== Selected publications ==
- Trade unionists and politics. Fabian Society, 1895. (Fabian Tract No. 65)
- Select documents illustrating the history of trade unionism: 1, The tailoring trade. 1896. (Editor)

Party political offices
Preceded by Tom Mann	Secretary of the London Reform Union; 1899–1918	Succeeded by ?
Preceded by William Sanders	General Secretary of the Fabian Society; 1920–1939	Succeeded by John Parker
