= Charles Mostyn Lloyd =

British academic, magazine editor, and socialist activist

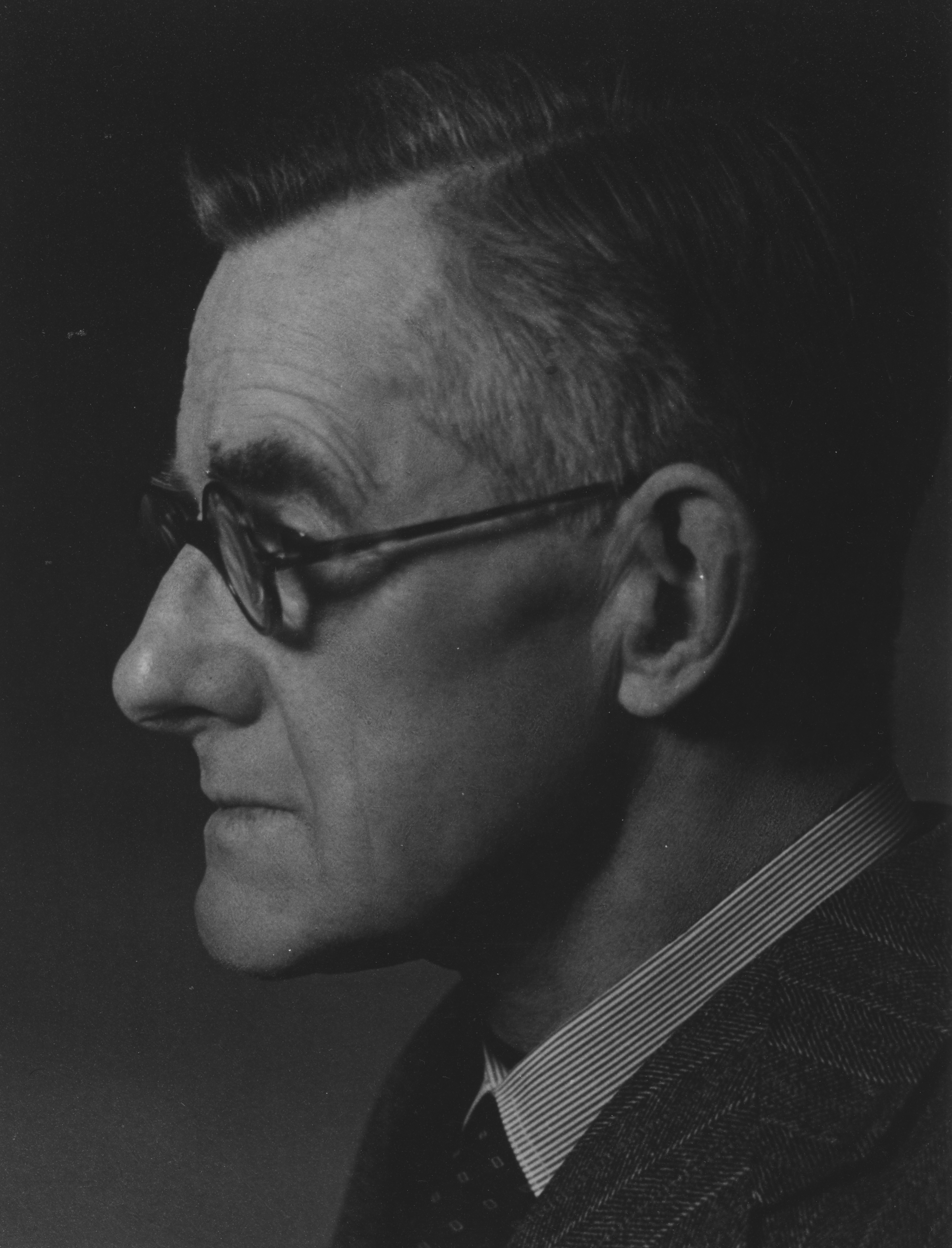
Portrait of Charles Mostyn Lloyd, c. 1930s

Charles Mostyn Lloyd (1878–1946) was a British academic, magazine editor, and socialist activist.

Lloyd became a barrister in 1907, but spent little time practising as he devoted himself to socialist activism. He joined the Fabian Society in 1906, serving on its executive from 1912, and was also active in the Independent Labour Party and the Labour Party. He lived at the Toynbee Hall settlement, and was also chair of the School Managers and Children's Care Committee in Whitechapel. From 1909 until 1914, he was secretary of the National Committee for the Prevention of Destitution.

Lloyd stood in local elections in Bethnal Green, and in the 1913 London County Council election in Deptford, but was not elected. He also wrote numerous books and pamphlets.

In 1915, Lloyd joined the British Army and fought in World War I. After he was seriously wounded on the first day of the Battle of the Somme, he was tasked to train cadet officers.

After the war, he covered the Versailles Peace Conference for the Manchester Guardian, and then began lecturing at the London School of Economics. He was promoted in 1922 to become head of its department of social science and administration. He was also heavily involved with the production of the New Statesman, effectively editing it from 1925, and becoming titular editor from 1928. He placed much hope in the Prime Ministership of Ramsay MacDonald; when MacDonald formed a National Government in 1931, Lloyd stood down as editor.

Media offices
Preceded by Clifford Sharp	Editor of the New Statesman; 1928–1931	Succeeded by Kingsley Martin
