= Arthur Clutton-Brock =

English essayist and journalist

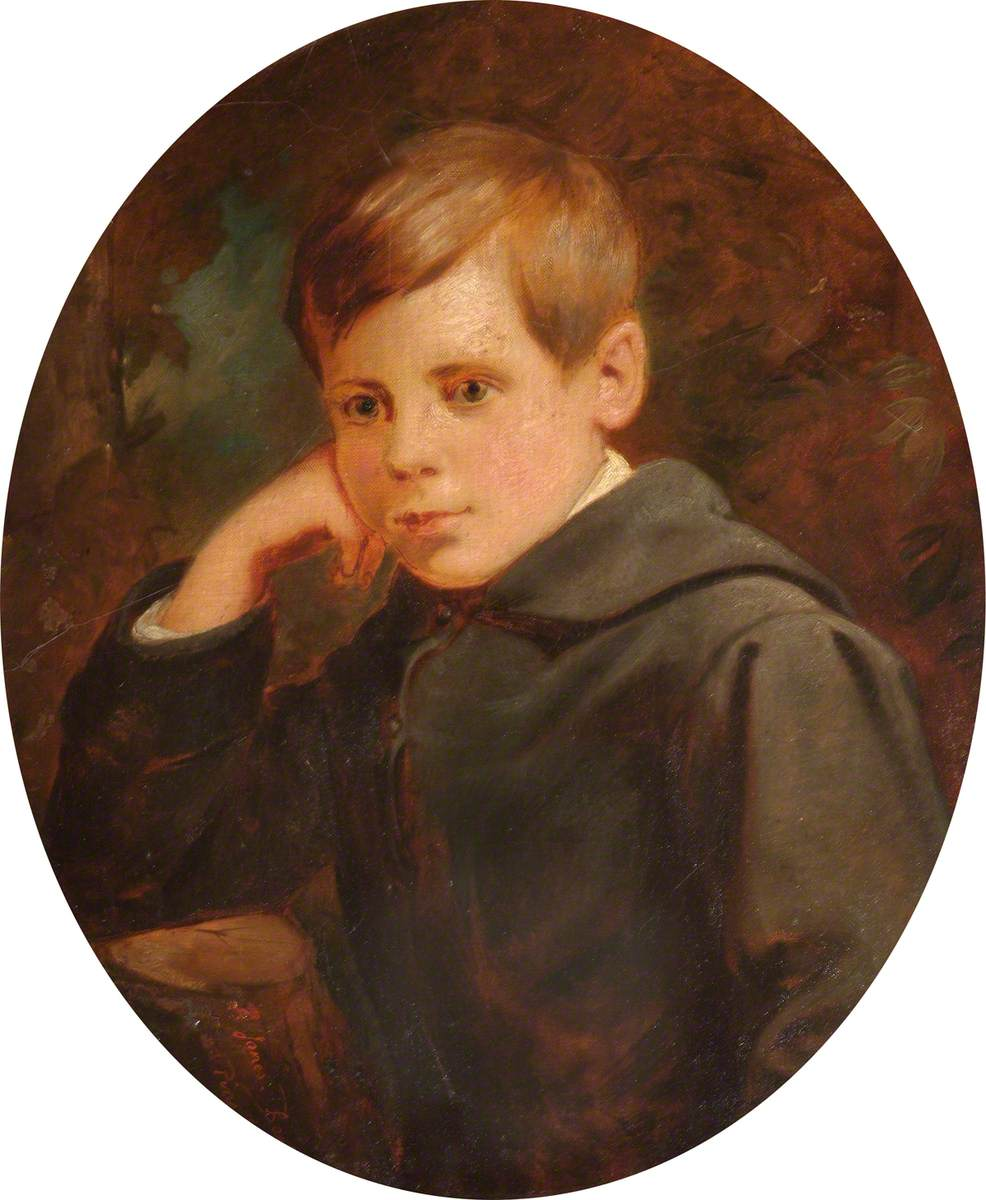

Arthur Clutton-Brock (23 March 1868 – 8 January 1924) was an English essayist, critic and journalist.

Arthur Clutton-Brock was born at Weybridge, third son of John Alan Clutton-Brock, a banker, and his wife Mary Alice, daughter of Rev. Henry Thomas Hill, rector of Felton, Herefordshire. They were first cousins, both being grandchildren of Rev. Henry William Hill, rector of Rock, Worcestershire. The Clutton-Brock family were landed gentry, of Pensax Court, near Tenbury, Worcestershire, where they had lived since the 1600s. They were coal mine owners. The family name originated in the adoption of the additional surname of 'Brock' by John Alan's father, Thomas Clutton, J.P., D.L., in 1809, as per a stipulation in the will of his maternal great-uncle, Thomas Brock, of Chester, Cheshire, in which county the Clutton family had been resident since the reign of Henry III. He was educated at Summerfields and Eton, then New College, Oxford. Following a short period in a stockbroker's office, he was called to the bar in 1895 by the Inner Temple, working as a barrister for some years.

In 1908 Clutton-Brock was appointed art critic on The Times, having previously occupied the same role on the staff of the Tribune and The Morning Post; he wrote however on a plethora of subjects, from gardening to religion. In 1903, he married Evelyn Alice, the daughter of the civil engineer Leveson Francis Vernon-Harcourt He lived at The Red House, Godalming, Surrey.

The historian John William Willis-Bund was first cousin to Clutton-Brock's mother Mary Alice.

== Selected publications ==
- Eton (1900)
- Shelley: The Man and the Poet (1909); 2nd edition (1922)
- William Morris: His Work and Influence (1914)
- Studies in Gardening (1916)
- Studies in Christianity (1918); reprint (1922)
- Essays on Art (1919)
- Essays on Books (1920)
- More Essays on Books (1921)
