= Hubert Bland =

English author

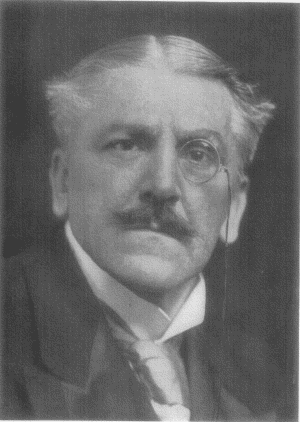
- Born: 3 January 1855; London, England
- Died: 14 April 1914 (aged 59); Well Hall House, Eltham, London England
- Occupations: Journalist, author
- Known for: Socialism, writings, infidelity
- Spouse: Edith Nesbit (m. 1880)
- Children: 5, including Rosamund

Hubert Bland (3 January 1855 – 14 April 1914) was an English author. He was known for being an infamous libertine, a journalist, an early English socialist, and one of the founders of the Fabian Society. He was the husband of Edith Nesbit.

== Early life and early careers ==
Bland was born in Woolwich, south-east London, the youngest of the four children of Henry Bland, a successful commercial clerk, and his wife Mary Ann. He was baptised on 14 March 1855 at St Mary Magdalene, Woolwich.

He received his formal education in local schools.

As a young man, Bland, showed his "passion was for politics" by his "strong interest in the political ideas raised at social protest meetings."

Bland wanted to attend the Royal Military Academy, Woolwich and become an army officer, but there was not enough money after his father's death, so he went to work as a bank clerk. Later, he went into a brush-making business that failed. After that, he worked as secretary to the General Hydraulic Power Company, parent company of the London Hydraulic Power Company.

== Marriage and mistresses ==
In 1877, he met 19-year-old Edith Nesbit (1858–1924). They married on 22 April 1880 with Nesbit already seven months pregnant. They did not immediately live together as Bland initially continued to live with his mother. According to biographer, Julia Briggs,

Bland continued to spend half of each week with his widowed mother and her paid companion, Maggie Doran,
who also had a son by him, though Nesbit did not realize this until later that summer when Bland fell ill with smallpox.

When, in 1880, Nesbit learned of her husband's affair with Maggie, she made friends with her.

With Nesbit, Bland produced three children: Paul (1880–1940), Iris (1881–1965) and Fabian (1885–1900), who died aged 15 from a tonsil operation performed at home. Fabian had been given food before the anaesthetic for the operation.

Bland met Alice Hoatson, a friend of Nesbit, after getting her pregnant in 1886: she became their housekeeper and his mistress for the rest of his life. Bland had two children by Hoatson: Rosamund (b. 1886), his favourite, and John (b. 1899). Despite initial reluctance, they were raised by Nesbit as her own.

Given Bland's affairs and out of wedlock children, his "marriage to Edith was inevitably stormy at times."

=== Bland's licentiousness ===
"Romance, in-loveness, cannot survive six weeks of the appalling intimacy of marriage... The thing that should follow is friendship... friendship touched by intimacy... Fools may make satisfactory lovers, only the wise can make lasting friends."

— Hubert Bland, "Modern Marriage" in Letters to a Daughter, 1907

Bland, "a poseur by nature, was something more than a philanderer by habit." He had "a voracious sexual appetite." When Nesbit met Bland, he "already had a mistress with child." After Alice Hoatson joined the Bland household, "he proceeded to father children on both her and Edith regularly." George Bernard Shaw described Bland as maintaining "simultaneously three wives, all of whom bore him children," and two of the "wives" lived in the same house. To top it off, Bland "was not averse to seeking to seduce" the girlfriends of his daughter Rosamund.

Bland wrote that he "hated the Pharisees, the Prigs, the Puritans." He smoked, and claimed to be "adventurous" with drugs, having taken "opium in all its forms" as well as other drugs.

== Fabian Society ==
In 1883, the Blands joined a socialist debating group which evolved to become the (middle-class, socialist) Fabian Society in January 1884. On 4 January 1884, Bland chaired the first meeting and was subsequently elected to be the Society's honorary treasurer, a position he held until his sight failed in 1911. With Edward Pease. Bland served as co-editor of the Fabian News, a monthly journal.

Nevertheless, "he sometimes disagreed with others in the group, and over the years he had been repeatedly outmanoeuvred and overruled by Shaw, Sidney Webb, and their supporters. Fellow members included Edward Pease, Havelock Ellis, and Frank Podmore.

"Socialism is the common holding of the means of production and exchange, and the holding of them for the benefit of all. . . . It is just when the storm winds blow and the clouds lour and the horizon is at its blackest that the ideal of the Socialist shines with divinest radiance, bidding him trust the inspiration of the poet rather than heed the mutterings of the perplexed politician.

— Hubert Bland, "The Outlook" in Fabian Essays on Socialism

George Bernard Shaw described how Bland intimidated other Fabian Society members, describing him as

a man of fierce Norman exterior and huge physical strength... never seen without an irreproachable frock coat, tall hat, and a single eyeglass which infuriated everybody. He was pugnacious, powerful, a skilled pugilist, and had a shrill, thin voice reportedly like the scream of an eagle. Nobody dared be uncivil to him.

Biographer, Julia Briggs, describes Bland as "an atypical Fabian":

Bland was an atypical Fabian, since he combined socialism with strongly conservative opinions that reflected his social background and his military sympathies... He was also strongly opposed to women's suffrage. At the same time he advocated collectivist socialism, wrote Fabian tracts, and lectured extensively on socialism. Bland was unconvinced by democracy and described it as 'bumptious, unidealistic, disloyal… anti-national and vulgar'.

Bland was (unlike most socialists) also an opponent of women's rights. He wrote:

Woman's metier in the world—I mean, of course, civilized woman, the woman in the world as it is—is to inspire romantic passion... Romantic passion is inspired by women who wear corsets. In other words, by the women who pretend to be what they not quite are.

By 1900, Bland was part of the inner circle who controlled the Fabian Society. In December 1906, he and other members of the inner circle defeated H. G. Wells's "attempt to take over and change the Fabian Society". Bland was the Fabian delegate at the Labour Party conferences in 1908 and 1910.

"The Blands' socialist principles and sympathy for the oppressed never prevented them from enjoying a thoroughly bourgeois affluence, reflected in their increasingly grand houses [and] growing numbers of servants." Their affluence began in the late 1880s when both of them were selling more of their writings.

== Other political activity ==
In 1885, Bland was briefly a member of the Social Democratic Federation, but he "found its programme too inflammatory."

In the 1890s, Bland supported the liberal Independent Labour Party. However, he took what some socialists saw as a reactionary position by supporting the South African Second Boer War. He wrote in December 1899 that defeat in Africa would mean "starvation in every city of Great Britain", while war would "overcome national flabbiness and restore the manhood of the British people." Bland's support of Britain's imperial interests began to make him unpopular with his fellow socialists.

Bland served for a while on the Board of Governors of the London School of Economics and Political Science.

== Journalist ==
Before his journalism career, Bland had shown that he was "ill-equipped for business." It was Nesbit who kept the household going financially by having her poems and stories published. With Nesbit's support, Bland became a journalist in 1889, at first as a freelancer. In 1892, he became a regular columnist for the radical newspaper, Manchester Sunday Chronicle. His column contained "amusing, sharp-eyed, and pithy" comments. Critics praise Bland as having been "the most forceful and influential columnist of his day" who reached "almost the high-water mark of English journalism." Yet, Bland's "writings are now forgotten, except by a few historians."

By 1899, the couple were financially secure. Bland's job as a columnist gave him "a secure income for the rest of his life" and Nesbit had become a successful writer. The couple lived in Well Hall House, Eltham from 1899 until Bland's death and Nesbit until 1920. Well Hall was their finest home and it served "a salon for figures in the literary political world."

== Death and legacy ==
After years of suffering from heart trouble, in November 1910 Bland had "a massive heart attack." The following year, his sight failed him. He had to give up lecturing and resign as treasurer of the Fabian Society. However, he continued writing his weekly column, with Alice Hoatson as his stenographer. He was dictating to her at Well Hall 14 April 1914, when he suddenly felt giddy, lowered himself to the floor, and died of a heart attack in her arms. He was buried with Catholic rites on 18 April in the family plot at Woolwich cemetery.

Regarding Bland's legacy, Claire Tomalin has written that

Bland is one of the minor enigmas of literary history in that everything reported of him makes him sound repellent, yet he was admired, even adored, by many intelligent men and women... He did not aspire to be consistent. He allowed his wife to support him with her pen for some years, but was always opposed to feminism... In mid-life, he joined the Catholic Church, a further cosmetic touch to his old-world image, but without modifying his behaviour or even bothering to attend more than the statutory minimum of masses.

== Works ==
- "The Outlook" in Fabian Essays on Socialism (Fabian Society, 1889))
- The Prophet's Mantle (1895/1898) by Fabian Bland, a pseudonym of Edith Nesbit and Hubert Bland.
- With the Eyes of a Man (T. Werner Laurie, 1905)
- Bread, Education: A Plan for the State Feeding of School Children (Fabian Society, 1905)
- Letters to a Daughter (M. Kennerley, 1907)
- The Happy Moralist (T. Werner Laurie, 1907)
- Socialism and Orthodoxy (Garden City Press, Printers, 1911)
- Essays: "Hubert" of the Sunday Chronicle, chosen by Edith Nesbit Bland (Goschen, 1914)

Party political offices
Preceded by New position	Treasurer of the Fabian Society; 1884–1911	Succeeded by F. Lawson Dodd
