= Karl Showler =

British beekeeper and author (1932–2022)

Thomas John Karl Showler (November 1932 – 3 August 2022) was a British beekeeper and writer who was director of the International Bee Research Association. Showler was president of the British Bee Keepers Association from 1989 to 1990. He resided in Brecon in Wales. With his late wife Betty Showler was a partner in B & K Books of Hay on Wye. Karl Showler died at a care home in Brecon on 3 August 2022, at the age of 89.

== Selected publications ==
- Practical bee-keeping. Ward Lock, London, 1977. (With Herbert Mace) ISBN 0706353919
- The observation hive. Bee Books New & Old, Steventon, 1978. ISBN 0905652037
- Some hints on the art and mystery of skep making. Northern Bee Books, 1990.
- Swarming: Its control & prevention. Bee Books Old & New, Burrowbridge, 1995. ISBN 9780905652283
- Tales from the Wye. 2000. (Illustrated by Ben McKee) ISBN 0953878805
- Essays in beekeeping history. BeeCraft, Warwickshire, 2011. ISBN 9780900147128
- Honey bee drone congregations. Central Association of Bee-Keepers, Upminster, 2012. ISBN 9781904379218
- James Atlay. Hereford's forgotten bishop a private study. 1868-1894. Karl Showler, 2012.
