= Fabian Society =

British socialist organisation founded in 1884

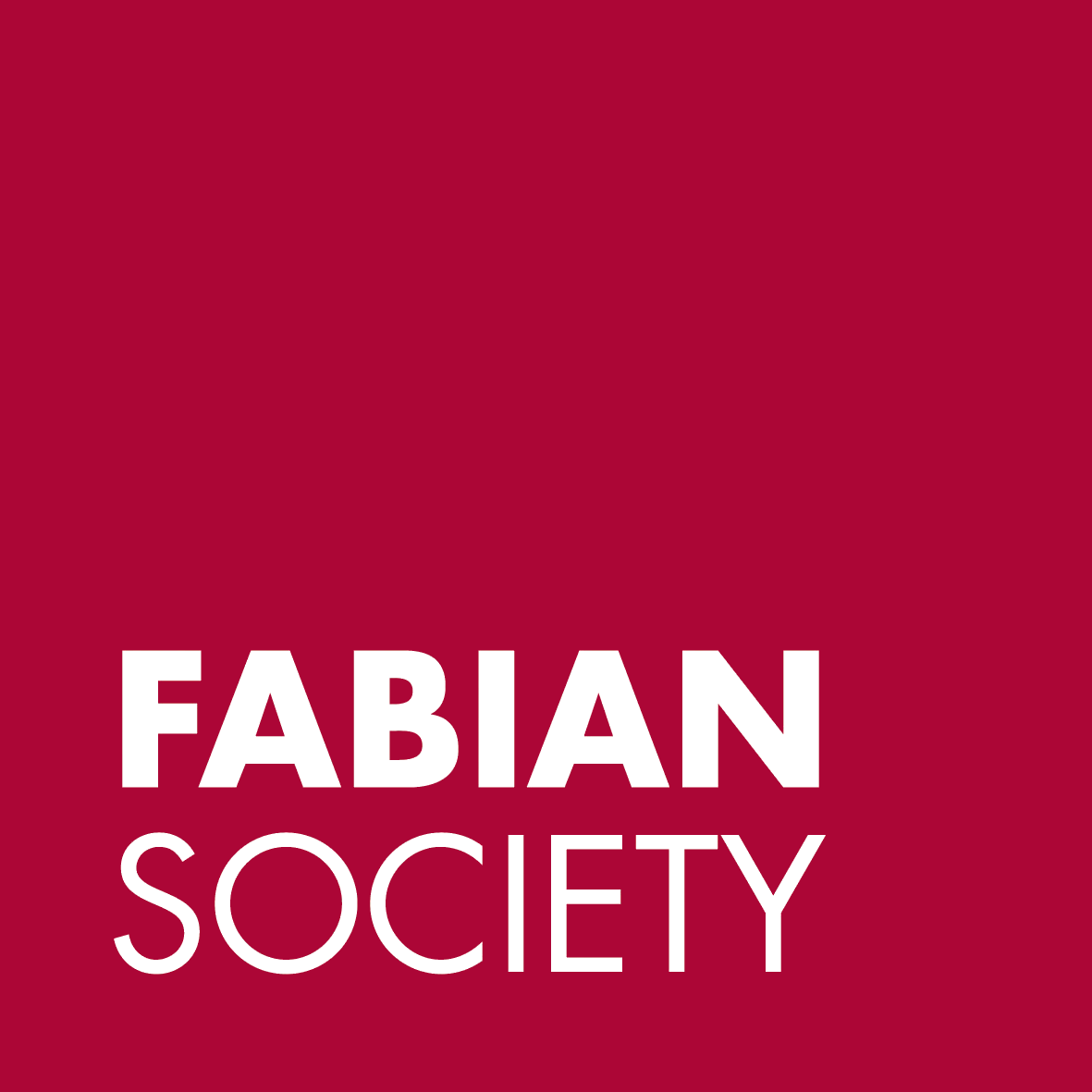
- Formation: 4 January 1884; 142 years ago
- Legal status: Unincorporated membership association
- Purpose: "To promote greater equality of power, wealth and opportunity; the value of collective action and public service; an accountable, tolerant and active democracy; citizenship, liberty and human rights; sustainable development; and multilateral international cooperation"
- Headquarters: London, England
- Members: 8,000
- Official language: English
- General Secretary: Joe Dromey
- Chair: The Baroness Hyde of Bemerton
- Vice-Chairs: Luke John Davies
- Treasurer: Paul Richards
- Main organ: Executive Committee
- Subsidiaries: Young Fabians, Fabian Women's Network, Scottish Fabians, around 60 local Fabian Societies
- Affiliations: Labour Party, Foundation for European Progressive Studies
- Website: Fabian Society

The Fabian Society (/ˈfeɪbiən/) is a British socialist organisation whose purpose is to advance the principles of democratic socialism via gradualist and reformist effort in democracies, rather than by revolutionary overthrow. It is related to radicalism, a left-wing liberal tradition.

As one of the founding organisations of the Labour Representation Committee in 1900, and as an important influence upon the Labour Party which grew from it, the Fabian Society has strongly influenced British politics. Members of the Fabian Society have included political leaders from other countries, such as Jawaharlal Nehru and Lee Kuan Yew, who adopted Fabian principles as part of their own political ideologies. The Fabian Society founded the London School of Economics in 1895.

Today, the society functions primarily as a think tank and is one of twenty socialist societies affiliated with the Labour Party. Similar societies exist in Australia, Canada, New Zealand and Italy.

== Organisational history ==
=== Establishment ===
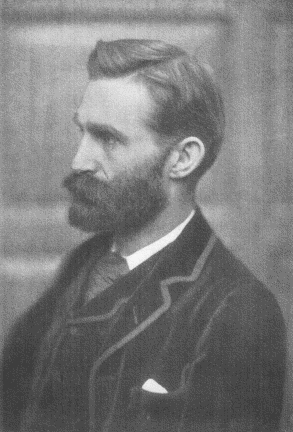
The Fabian Society was named after "Fabius the Delayer" at the suggestion of Frank Podmore (above)

A wolf in sheep's clothing, the original coat of arms of the Fabian Society

The Fabian Society was founded on 4 January 1884 in London as an offshoot of a society founded a year earlier, called The Fellowship of the New Life, which had been a forebear of the British Ethical and humanist movements. Early Fellowship members included the visionary Victorian-era elite, among them the poets Edward Carpenter and John Davidson, the sexologist and eugenicist Havelock Ellis, and the early socialist Edward R. Pease. They wanted to transform society by setting an example of clean simplified living for others to follow. Some members also wanted to become politically involved to aid society's transformation; they set up a separate society, the Fabian Society. All members were free to attend both societies. The Fabian Society additionally advocated renewal of Western European Renaissance ideas and their promulgation throughout the world.

The Fellowship of the New Life was dissolved in 1899, but the Fabian Society grew to become a leading academic society in the United Kingdom in the Edwardian era. It was typified by the members of its vanguard Coefficients club. Public meetings of the Society were for many years held at Essex Hall, a popular location just off the Strand in Central London.

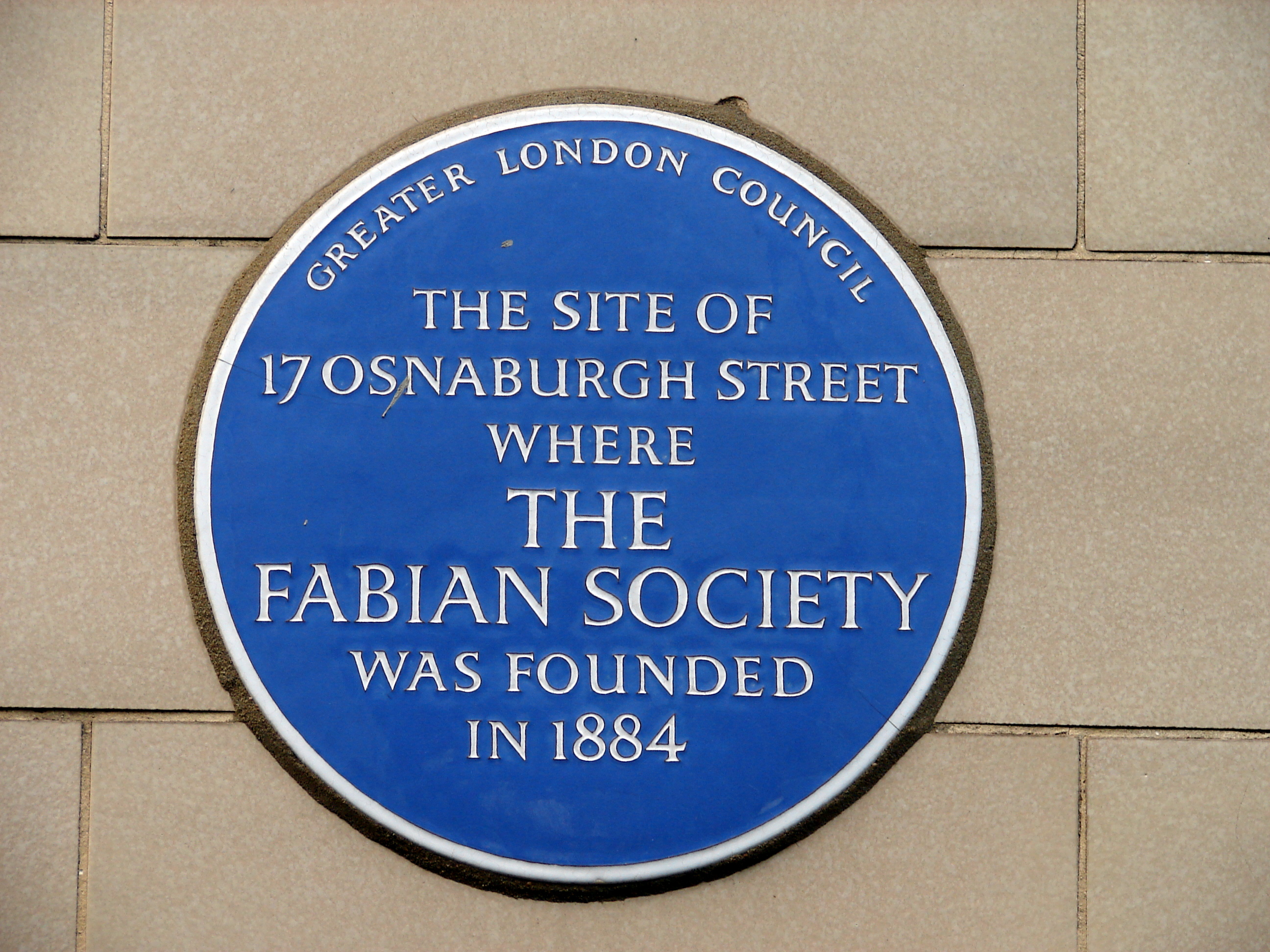
Blue plaque at 17 Osnaburgh St, where the Society was founded in 1884

The Fabian Society was named—at the suggestion of Frank Podmore—in honour of the Roman general Quintus Fabius Maximus Verrucosus (nicknamed Cunctator, meaning the "Delayer"). His Fabian strategy sought gradual victory against the superior Carthaginian army under the renowned general Hannibal through persistence, harassment, and wearing the enemy down by attrition rather than pitched, climactic battles.

An explanatory note appearing on the title page of the group's first pamphlet declared:

For the right moment you must wait, as Fabius did most patiently when warring against Hannibal, though many censured his delays; but when the time comes you must strike hard, as Fabius did, or your waiting will be in vain, and fruitless.

According to the author Jon Perdue, "The logo of the Fabian Society, a tortoise, represented the group's predilection for a slow, imperceptible transition to socialism, while its coat of arms, a 'wolf in sheep's clothing', represented its preferred methodology for achieving its goal." The wolf in sheep's clothing symbolism was later abandoned, due to its obvious negative connotations. Vanesha Singh, former acting editorial officer at the Fabian Society stated "Though it hasn’t been used for many decades, the original coat of arms was intended to symbolise the society’s rejection of violent revolution in favour of cautious, evolutionary change. The wolf in sheep’s clothing was therefore a metaphor for gradually advancing socialism. Yet, many see it as proof that the Fabians are concealing a dark agenda and ‘deadly intentions’ whilst fronting as an ‘harmless institution’. As one website reads, it is “chillingly clear that the Fabian Society is a devious, subversive organisation".

Its nine founding members were Frank Podmore, Edward R. Pease, William Clarke, Hubert Bland, Percival Chubb, Frederick Keddell, Henry Hyde Champion, E. Nesbit and Rosamund Dale Owen. Havelock Ellis is sometimes also mentioned as a tenth founding member, although there is some question about this.

=== Organisational growth ===
Immediately upon its inception, the Fabian Society began attracting many prominent contemporary figures drawn to its socialist cause, including George Bernard Shaw, H. G. Wells, Annie Besant, Graham Wallas, Charles Marson, Sydney Olivier, Oliver Lodge, Ramsay MacDonald and Emmeline Pankhurst. Bertrand Russell briefly became a member, but resigned after he expressed his belief that the Society's principle of entente (in this case, between countries allying themselves against Germany) could lead to war.

At the core of the Fabian Society were Sidney and Beatrice Webb. Together, they wrote numerous studies of industrial Britain, including alternative co-operative economics that applied to ownership of capital as well as land.

Many Fabians participated in the formation of the Labour Representation Committee in 1900 and the group's constitution, written by Sidney Webb, borrowed heavily from the founding documents of the Fabian Society. At the meeting that founded the Labour Representation Committee in 1900, the Fabian Society claimed 861 members and sent one delegate.

The years 1903 to 1908 saw a growth in popular interest in the socialist idea in Britain, and the Fabian Society grew accordingly, trebling its membership to nearly 2,500 by the end of the period, half of whom were located in London. In 1912 a student section was organised called the University Socialist Federation (USF) and by the outbreak of World War I in 1914 this contingent counted its own membership of more than 500.

The Fabian Women's Group was founded on 14th March 1908 to create a stronger link between women's suffrage and socialism. It operated until 1948. Letitia Fairfield was a member and spoke to Brian Harrison about joining the Group, and their lectures and discussions as part of the Suffrage Interviews project, titled Oral evidence on the suffragette and suffragist movements: the Brian Harrison interviews.

=== Early Fabian views ===
The first Fabian Society pamphlets advocating tenets of social justice coincided with the zeitgeist of progressive reforms during the early 1900s. The Fabians lobbied for the introduction of a minimum wage in 1906, for the creation of a universal health care system in 1911 and for the abolition of hereditary peerages in 1917. Agnes Harben and Henry Devenish Harben were among Fabians advocating women's emancipation and supporting suffrage movements in Britain, and internationally.

The early Fabian Society’s advocacy for social reform was deeply intertwined with the contemporary eugenics movement, which was particularly popular among progressive intellectuals at the time. Rather than a peripheral interest, eugenics provided the 'scientific' basis for the early Fabian vision of a rationally planned society. Leading figures in the early Fabian Society such as Sidney and Beatrice Webb, George Bernard Shaw, and H. G. Wells argued that a rationalised socialist state required the 'improvement of the human stock' to ensure social efficiency through the gradual elimination of undesirable elements through compulsory sterilisation and segregation. They were also influenced by the idea that the lowest echelons of society, sometimes termed the 'residuum', "had hereditary defects and would increasingly degenerate."

Sidney Webb wrote in The Difficulties of Individualism (1896) about the problem of the "breeding of degenerate hordes of a demoralized ‘residuum’ unfit for social life". Havelock Ellis, a founding member of the Fabian Society, was a vice-president of the Eugenics Society from 1909–12. He wrote in opposition to the provision of welfare to this 'residuum', since, in his view, the "superficially sympathetic man flings a coin to the beggar; the more deeply sympathetic man builds an almshouse for him so that he need no longer beg; but perhaps the most radically sympathetic of all is the man who arranges that the beggar shall not be born. So it is the question of breed, the production of fine individuals, the elevation of the ideal of quality in human production over that of mere quantity, begins to be seen, not merely as a noble idea in itself, but as the only method by which Socialism can be enabled to continue on its present path."

Fabian socialists were in favour of reforming the foreign policy of the British Empire as a conduit for internationalist reform and were in favour of a capitalist welfare state modelled on the Bismarckian German model; they criticised Gladstonian liberalism both for its individualism at home and its internationalism abroad. They favoured a national minimum wage in order to stop British industries compensating for their inefficiency by lowering wages instead of investing in capital equipment; slum clearances and a health service in order for "the breeding of even a moderately Imperial race" which would be more productive and better militarily than the "stunted, anaemic, demoralised denizens ... of our great cities"; and a national education system because "it is in the classrooms ... that the future battles of the Empire for commercial prosperity are already being lost".

In 1900 the Society produced Fabianism and the Empire, the first statement of its views on foreign affairs, drafted by Bernard Shaw and incorporating the suggestions of 150 Fabian members. It was directed against the liberal individualism of those such as John Morley and Sir William Harcourt. It claimed that the classical liberal political economy was outdated, and that imperialism was the new stage of the international polity. The question was whether Britain would be the centre of a world empire or whether it would lose its colonies and end up as just two islands in the North Atlantic. It expressed support for Britain in the Boer War because small nations, such as the Boers, were anachronisms in the age of empires. Much of the work developing and organising the thinking behind a Fabian post-colonial position on the Empire was done by South African-born Rita Hinden between the 1940s–1960s.

In order to hold onto the Empire, the British needed to fully exploit the trade opportunities secured by war; maintain the British armed forces in a high state of readiness to defend the Empire; and create a citizen army to replace the professional army; the Factory Acts would be amended to extend to 21 the age for half-time employment, so that the thirty hours gained would be used in "a combination of physical exercises, technical education, education in civil citizenship ... and field training in the use of modern weapons".

The Fabians also favoured the nationalisation of land rent, believing that rents collected by landowners in respect of their land's value were unearned, an idea which drew heavily from the work of the American economist Henry George. George Bernard Shaw wrote "When I was thus swept into the great socialist revival of 1883, I found that 5/6 of those who were swept in with me had been converted by Henry George."

=== Second generation ===
In the period between the two World Wars, the "Second Generation" Fabians, including the writers R. H. Tawney, G. D. H. Cole and Harold Laski, continued to be a major influence on socialist thought. Cole's New Fabian Research Bureau, founded in 1931, was particularly important in revitalising both the Fabians and Labour generally from an interwar low.

But the general idea is that each man should have power according to his knowledge and capacity. [...] And the keynote is that of my fairy State: From every man according to his capacity; to every man according to his needs. A democratic Socialism, controlled by majority votes, guided by numbers, can never succeed; a truly aristocratic Socialism, controlled by duty, guided by wisdom, is the next step upwards in civilisation.

— Annie Besant, a Fabian Society member and later president of Indian National Congress

It was at this time that many of the future leaders of the Third World were exposed to Fabian thought, most notably India's Jawaharlal Nehru, who subsequently framed economic policy for India on Fabian socialism lines. After independence from Britain, Nehru's Fabian ideas committed India to an economy in which the state owned, operated and controlled means of production, in particular key heavy industrial sectors such as steel, telecommunications, transportation, electricity generation, mining and real estate development. Private activity, property rights and entrepreneurship were discouraged or regulated through permits, while nationalisation of economic activity and high taxes were encouraged, and rationing, control of individual choices and the Mahalanobis model were considered by Nehru as a means to implement the Fabian Society version of socialism. In addition to Nehru, several pre-independence leaders in colonial India such as Annie Besant—Nehru's mentor and later a president of Indian National Congress – were members of the Fabian Society.

Obafemi Awolowo, who later became the premier of Nigeria's now defunct Western Region, was also a Fabian member in the late 1940s. It was the Fabian ideology that Awolowo used to run the Western Region during his premiership with great success, although he was prevented from using it in a similar fashion on the national level in Nigeria. It is less known that the founder of Pakistan, Muhammad Ali Jinnah, was an avid member of the Fabian Society in the early 1930s. Lee Kuan Yew, the first prime minister of Singapore, stated in his memoirs that his initial political philosophy was strongly influenced by the Fabian Society. However, he later altered his views, considering the Fabian ideal of socialism as impractical. In 1993, Lee said:

They [Fabian Socialists] were going to create a just society for the British workers—the beginning of a welfare state, cheap council housing, free medicine and dental treatment, free spectacles, generous unemployment benefits. Of course, for students from the colonies, like Singapore and Malaya, it was a great attraction as the alternative to communism. We did not see until the 1970s that that was the beginning of big problems contributing to the inevitable decline of the British economy.

In the Middle East the theories of the Fabian Society intellectual movement of early-20th-century Britain inspired the Ba'athist vision. The Middle East adaptation of Fabian socialism led the state to control big industry, transport, banks, internal and external trade. The state would direct the course of economic development, with the ultimate aim to provide a guaranteed minimum standard of living for all. Michel Aflaq, widely considered as the founder of the Ba'athist movement, was a Fabian socialist. Aflaq's ideas, with those of Salah al-Din al-Bitar and Zaki al-Arsuzi, came to fruition in the Arab world in the form of dictatorial regimes in Iraq and Syria. Salāmah Mūsā of Egypt, another prominent champion of Arab Socialism, was a keen adherent of Fabian Society, and a member since 1909.

In October 1940 the Fabian Society established the Fabian Colonial Bureau to facilitate research and debate British colonial policy. The Fabian Colonial Bureau strongly influenced the colonial policies of the Attlee government (1945–51). Rita Hinden founded the colonial bureau and was its secretary.

Fabian academics of the late-20th century included the political scientist Sir Bernard Crick, the economists Thomas Balogh and Nicholas Kaldor and the sociologist Peter Townsend.

== 20th century ==
During the 20th century the group was always influential in Labour Party circles, with members including Ramsay MacDonald, Clement Attlee, Anthony Crosland, Roy Jenkins, Hugh Dalton, Richard Crossman, Ian Mikardo, Tony Benn, Harold Wilson, and more recently Shirley Williams, Tony Blair, Gordon Brown, Gordon Marsden and Ed Balls. 229 members of the Society were elected to the House of Commons at the 1945 general election. Ben Pimlott was its chairman in the 1990s; a Pimlott Prize for Political Writing was organised in his memory by the Fabian Society and The Guardian in 2005 and continues annually. The Society is affiliated to the party as a socialist society. In recent years the Young Fabian group, founded in 1960, has become a networking and discussion organisation for younger (under 31) Labour Party activists and played a role in the 1994 election of Blair as the leader of the Labour Party. Today there is also an active Fabian Women's Network and Scottish and Welsh Fabian groups.

=== Influence on Labour government ===
Following the election of a Labour Party government in 1997, the Fabian Society was a forum for New Labour ideas and for critical approaches from across the party. The most significant Fabian contribution to Labour's policy agenda in government was Balls's 1992 discussion paper, advocating Bank of England independence. Balls had been a Financial Times journalist when he wrote this Fabian pamphlet, before going to work for Gordon Brown. Former BBC Business Editor Robert Peston, in his book Brown's Britain, calls this an "essential tract" and concludes that Balls "deserves as much credit – probably more – than anyone else for the creation of the modern Bank of England"; William Keegan offered a similar analysis of Balls's Fabian pamphlet in his book on Labour's economic policy, which traces in detail the path leading up to this dramatic policy change after Labour's first week in office.

== Contemporary Fabianism ==
In June 2019, the Fabian Society had 7,136 individual members.

=== Prime ministers ===
Several British prime ministers have been members of, or closely associated with, the Fabian Society, including:

- Ramsay MacDonald
- Clement Attlee
- Harold Wilson
- James Callaghan
- Tony Blair
- Gordon Brown
- Keir Starmer
- Andy Burnham

According to the Fabian Society, every Labour prime minister has been a Fabian.

The latest edition of the Dictionary of National Biography (a reference work listing details of famous or significant Britons throughout history) includes 174 Fabians. Four Fabians, Beatrice and Sidney Webb, Graham Wallas and George Bernard Shaw, founded the London School of Economics with the money left to the Fabian Society by Henry Hutchinson. Supposedly the decision was made at a breakfast party on 4 August 1894. The founders are depicted in the Fabian Window designed by Shaw. The window was stolen in 1978 and reappeared at Sotheby's in 2005. It was restored to display in the Shaw Library at the London School of Economics in 2006 at a ceremony over which Blair presided.

The Fabian Society Tax Commission of 2000 was widely credited with influencing the Labour government's policy and political strategy for its one significant public tax increase: the National Insurance rise to raise £8 billion for National Health Service spending. (The Fabian Commission had in fact called for a directly hypothecated "NHS tax" to cover the full cost of NHS spending, arguing that linking taxation more directly to spending was essential to make tax rise publicly acceptable. The 2001 National Insurance rise was not formally hypothecated, but the government committed itself to using the additional funds for health spending.) Several other recommendations, including a new top rate of income tax, were to the left of government policy and not accepted, though this comprehensive review of UK taxation was influential in economic policy and political circles, and a new top rate of income tax of 50 per cent was introduced in 2010.

In early 2017 Fabian general secretary Andrew Harrop produced a report arguing the only feasible route for Labour to return to government would be to work with the Liberal Democrats and Scottish National Party. The report predicted Labour would win fewer than 150 seats at the 2017 general election, the lowest number since 1935, due to their opposition to Brexit, lack of support in Scotland, and Labour leader Jeremy Corbyn's unpopularity, although it won 262.

=== Fabianism outside the United Kingdom ===
The major influence on the Labour Party and on the English-speaking socialist movement worldwide has meant that Fabianism became one of the main inspirations of international democratic socialism.

In February 1895 an American Fabian Society was established in Boston, Massachusetts, by W. D. P. Bliss, a prominent Christian socialist. The group published a periodical, The American Fabian, and issued a small series of pamphlets. Around the same time a parallel organisation emerged on the Pacific coast, centred in California, under the influence of the socialist activist Laurence Gronlund. American Fabianism lasted for less than a decade.

Similar non-UK societies include the Australian Fabian Society, the Douglas–Coldwell Foundation and the now-disbanded League for Social Reconstruction in Canada, and the NZ Fabian Society in New Zealand.

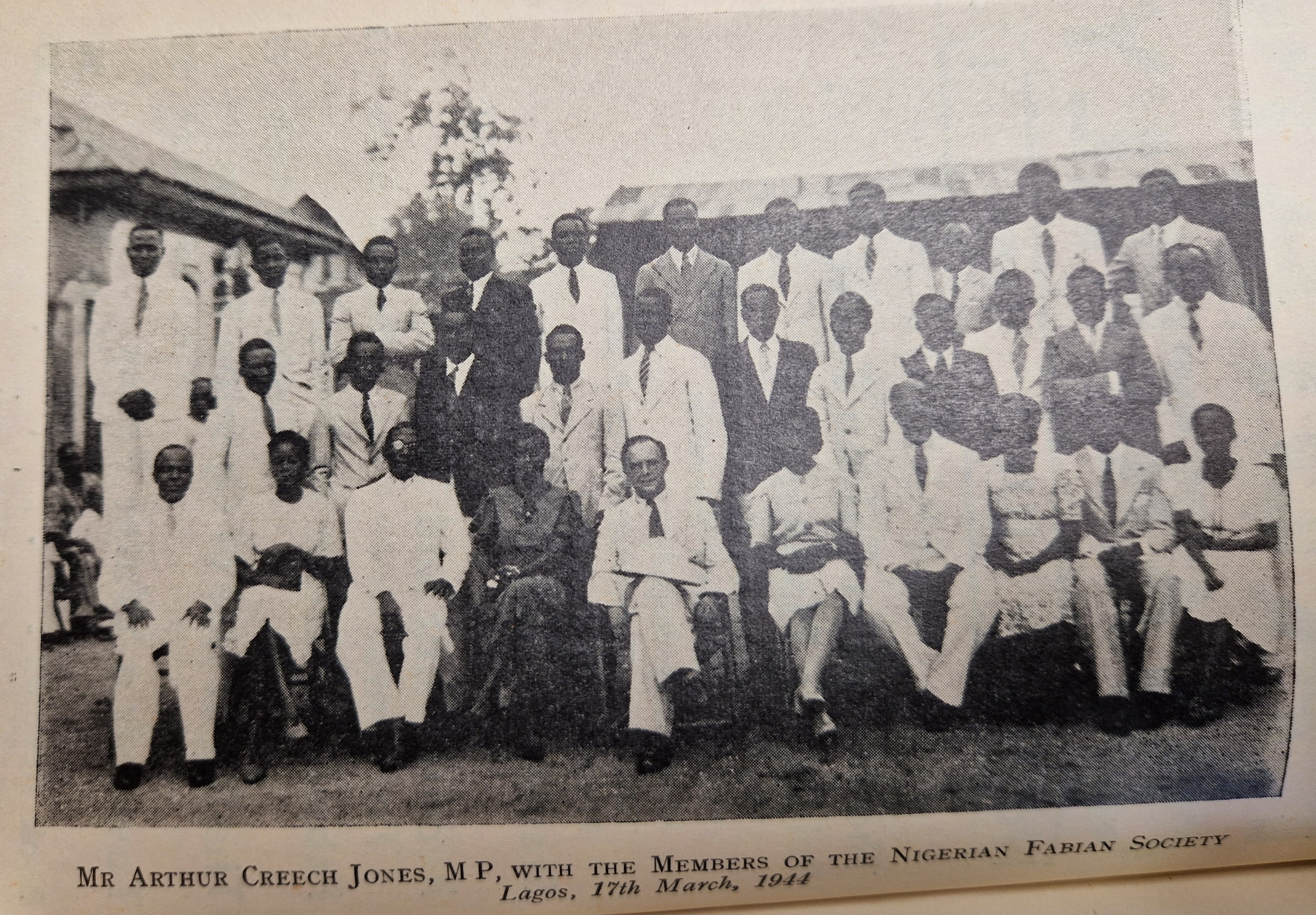
Nigerian Fabian Society, 1944.

The Fabian Quarterly of 1944 reported the existence of a Nigerian Fabian Society led by Max Iyalla and visited by Arthur Creech Jones.

Direct or indirect Fabian influence may also be seen in the liberal socialism of Carlo Rosselli, founder, with his brother Nello, of the anti-fascist group Giustizia e Libertà, and its successor movements, including the Action Party in Italy. The Community Movement, founded by the socialist entrepreneur Adriano Olivetti, was the only Italian party to refer explicitly to Fabianism among its principal inspirations. Olivetti's political thought combined Fabian, communitarian, socialist and Christian influences.

A Fabian Society existed in Luxembourg from 1983-1990, formally known as 'The Left Club and Luxembourg Fabian Society.

In 2000 the Sicilian Fabian Society was founded in Messina.

== Structure ==
It is written into the rules of the society that it has no policies. All the publications carry a disclaimer saying that they do not represent the collective views of the society but only the views of the authors. "No resolution of a political character expressing an opinion or calling for action, other than in relation to the running of the Society itself, shall be put forward in the name of the Society."

=== Executive committee ===
The Fabian Society is governed by an elected executive committee. The committee consists of 10 ordinary members elected from a national list, three members nationally elected from a list nominated by local groups, representatives from the Young Fabians, Fabians Women's Network and Scottish and Welsh Fabians. There is also one staff representative and a directly elected honorary treasurer from the membership. Elections are held every other year, with the exception of the Young Fabians and staff representation which are elected annually. The committee meets quarterly and elect a chair and at least one vice-chair annually to conduct its business. The current chair of the Fabian Society is Martin Edobor.

=== Secretariat ===
The Fabian Society has a number of employees based in their headquarters in London. The secretariat is led by a general secretary, who is the organisation's CEO. The staff are arranged into departments including Research, Editorial, Events, and Operations.

=== Fabian Review ===
The Fabian Society publishes the Fabian Review, a quarterly magazine.

=== Young Fabians ===
Since 1960 members aged under 31 years of age have also been members of the Young Fabians. This group has its own elected Chair, executive committee and sub-groups. The Young Fabians are a voluntary organisation that serves as an incubator for member-led activities such as policy and social events, pamphlets and delegations. Within the group are five special interest communities called Networks that are run by voluntary steering groups and elect their own Chair and officers. The current Networks are Economy & Finance, Health, International Affairs, Education, Communications (Industry), Environment, Tech, Devolution & Local Government, Law, and Arts & Culture. It also publishes the quarterly magazine Anticipations.

In 2023 the Fabian Society suspended all Young Fabians' face-to-face activities following its non-public review of culture and practice. In 2024, Young Fabians was relaunched with under-18s barred from membership, and the upper age limit reduced from 30 to 27. Young Fabians will also be led by two co-chairs, at least one being a woman, with member complaints directly handled by the Fabian Society.

=== Fabian Women's Network ===
All female members of the Fabian Society are also members of the Fabian Women's Network. This group has its own elected Chair and Executive Committee which organises conferences and events and works with the wider political movement to secure increased representation for women in politics and public life. It has a flagship mentoring programme that recruits on an annual basis, and its president is Seema Malhotra, a Labour and Co-operative MP. The Network also publishes the quarterly magazine, Fabiana, runs a range of public speaking events, works closely in partnership with a range of women's campaigning organisations and regularly hosts a fringe at the Labour Party conference.

=== Local Fabians ===
There are 45 local Fabian societies across the UK, bringing Fabian debates to communities around the country. Some, such as Bournemouth and Oxford, have long histories, dating from the 1890s, though most have waxed and waned over the years. The Fabian local societies were given a major boost during the Second World War when re-founded by G. D. H. Cole and Margaret Cole, who noted renewed interest in socialism and that wartime evacuation created chances for Fabians to strengthen influence outside London. Many local societies are affiliated to their local constituency Labour Party and have their own executive bodies. These local branches are affiliated to the national Fabians and local members have the same voting rights as their national counterparts.

== Influence on the political right ==
When founded in 1884 as a parliamentarian organisation, there was no leftist party with which the Fabians could connect. As such, they initially attempted to 'permeate' the Liberal Party, with some success. The foundation of the Labour Party in 1900 signalled a change in tactics, although Fabian–Liberal links on specific topics such as welfare reform lasted well into the interwar period.

More recent studies have examined their impact on the Conservative Party, such as the foundation of Ashridge College, explicitly designed in the 1930s to create Conservative Fabians.

== Critiques of the Fabians ==
As one of the world's oldest and most prominent think tanks, the Fabians have sometimes fallen under criticism, more often from the left than the right. Most older critiques focused on the Fabians' political organisation efforts and claims to have been influential. Although H. G. Wells was a member of the Fabian Society from 1903 to 1908, he was a critic of its operations, particularly in his 1905 paper "The Faults of the Fabian", in which he claimed the Society was a middle-class talking shop. He later parodied the society in his 1910 novel The New Machiavelli.

Vladimir Lenin during the First World War wrote that the Fabians were "social-chauvinists", "undoubtedly the most consummate expression of opportunism and of Liberal-Labour policy". Drawing from Friedrich Engels, Lenin declared the Fabians were "a gang of bourgeois rogues who would demoralise the workers, influence them in a counter-revolutionary spirit". This said, as Eric Hobsbawm later noted, the Webbs' book Industrial Democracy, which he claimed contained 'an entire theory of democracy, the state and the transition to socialism', 'was sufficiently interesting to Lenin, who translated it, to some crucial passages in What Is To Be Done'.

In the 1920s, Leon Trotsky critiqued the Fabian Society as provincial, boring, and unnecessary, particularly to the working class. He wrote that their published works "serve merely to explain to the Fabians themselves why Fabianism exists in the world".

The post-war Communist Party Historians Group was critical of the Fabians, and indeed the post-war consensus, with its strong social-democratic influence. The Marxist historian Eric Hobsbawm wrote his PhD thesis attacking claims from the early Fabians to have been originators of the Labour Party and the post-war consensus. Instead, he argued that the credit should be given to the more autonomous, working-class Independent Labour Party. Fabian socialism has also been criticised for expanding state power under the guise of social justice, with critics like Friedrich Hayek arguing in his book The Road to Serfdom that such policies lead to a "centralized state dominated by unelected bureaucrats."

In more recent years, critiques of the early Fabians have focused on other areas. In an article published in The Guardian on 14 February 2008 (following the apology offered by Australian Prime Minister Kevin Rudd to the "stolen generations"), Geoffrey Robertson criticised Fabian socialists for providing the intellectual justification for the eugenics policy that led to the stolen generations scandal. Similar claims have been repeated in The Spectator. In 2009, making a speech in the United States, the British MP George Galloway denounced the Fabian Society for its failure to support the uprising of Easter 1916 in Dublin during which an Irish Republic was proclaimed. Others, including Thomas Sowell, have criticised the Fabians, in his work Intellectuals and Society, stating they represent an elitist managerial class that favours "governance by intellectuals and experts" over grassroots democracy.

== Funding ==
The Fabian Society has been rated as "broadly transparent" in its funding by Transparify. The funding transparency website Who Funds You? has awarded the Fabian Society an A grade for several years, the highest transparency rating.

== See also ==
- Long march through the institutions
- Ethical movement
- Keir Hardie
- Labour Research Department
- List of Fabian Tracts to 1915
- List of think tanks in the United Kingdom
- New Statesman
- The New Age
