= Hobhouse =

Hobhouse is an English surname, generally belonging to members of a family originally from Somerset. Those currently with this surname are members of several branches of this patronymic that achieved prominence from the 18th century. Originally merchants, the family diversified into the slave trade, joined the ranks of the West country gentry, accumulating wealth through advantageous marriages and entering into local and national politics, both with success.

Notable Hobhouses include:

- Arthur Hobhouse (1886–1965), long-serving English local government Liberal politician, the architect of the system of National Parks of England and Wales
- Arthur Hobhouse, 1st Baron Hobhouse (1819–1904), English judge
- Benjamin Hobhouse (1757–1831), British politician
- Charles Hobhouse (1862–1941), British Liberal politician, a member of the Liberal cabinet of H. H. Asquith between 1911 and 1915
- Edmund Hobhouse (1817–1904), bishop of Nelson, New Zealand, and an antiquary
- Emily Hobhouse (1860–1926), publicised the poor conditions inside the British concentration camps built in South Africa during the Second Boer War
- Henry Hobhouse (archivist) (1776–1854), English archivist
- Henry William Hobhouse (1791–1868), British Member of Parliament for Hereford
- Henry Hobhouse (East Somerset MP) (1854–1937), English landowner and Liberal politician
- Henry Hobhouse (author) (1924–2016), English sailor, broadcaster, journalist, farmer, author, and politician
- Hermione Hobhouse (1934–2014), architectural historian and conservationist
- Isaac Hobhouse (1685–1763), English slave trader and merchant
- Janet Hobhouse (1948–1991), American novelist, biographer and editor
- John Hobhouse, 1st Baron Broughton (1786–1869), British politician and memoirist
- John Hobhouse, Baron Hobhouse of Woodborough (1932–2004), British Law Lord
- Kate Hobhouse, British heiress, businesswoman and philanthropist
- Leonard Hobhouse (1864–1929), British liberal politician and proponent of social liberalism
- Mary Hobhouse (1864–1901), Irish poet and novelist
- Penelope Hobhouse (born 1929), British garden writer and designer
- Reginald Hobhouse (1818–1895), first Archdeacon of Bodmin and father of Emily and Leonard
- Rosa Waugh Hobhouse (1882–1971), British social worker and pacifist
- Stephen Hobhouse (1881–1961), English peace activist, prison reformer, and religious writer
- Thomas Hobhouse (1807–1876), British Liberal Party politician
- Walter Hobhouse (1862–1928), Anglican priest and author
- Wera Hobhouse (born 1960), German-born Liberal Democrat Member of the UK Parliament
- Will Hobhouse (born 1956), English businessman and investor

== See also ==
- Hobhouse, Free State, town in South Africa
