= Donald Wilson (writer and producer) =

Scottish television writer and producer (1910–2002)

- Born: Donald Boyd Wilson; 11 September 1910; Dunblane, Scotland
- Died: 5 March 2002 (aged 91); Standish, Gloucestershire, England
- Education: Glasgow School of Art
- Occupations: Screenwriter, television producer
- Known for: Co-creating Doctor Who
- Spouse: Helena Taylor (m. 1938; died 2000)
- Children: 2

Donald Boyd Wilson (11 September 1910 – 5 March 2002) was a Scottish television writer and producer who worked for the BBC. His work included co-creating the science fiction series Doctor Who in 1963, also later saying that he had named the series, and adapting and producing The Forsyte Saga in 1967.

== Early life and career ==
Wilson was born in Dunblane on 11 September 1910. He attended the Glasgow School of Art, following which his first jobs were as a newspaper cartoonist and sketch writer.

His initial career was in the film industry, including working for MGM at Elstree Studios, where he was Assistant Director of such films as Jericho (1937) and Goodbye, Mr. Chips (1939). During the Second World War he served with the Cameronians and the 43rd Wessex Division before afterwards returning to the film industry, including helming his only film as director, Warning to Wantons. In 1955, he was recruited to BBC Television by the then Head of Drama, Michael Barry. As the Head of the Script Department, Wilson was ultimately responsible for overseeing the commissioning and development of all the original scripts and adaptations transmitted by BBC Television.

== Doctor Who ==
When the Script Department was rendered redundant by Sydney Newman’s radical shake-up of the BBC Drama Department after his arrival as its head in 1962, the highly respected Wilson was given one of the most senior positions under Newman as head of serials. In this position, Wilson was responsible for overseeing the creation and development of a series that Newman himself had originally conceived: an educational science-fiction serial entitled Doctor Who. It was Wilson, together with Newman and staff writer C. E. Webber, who co-wrote the first format document for the programme.

In a 1971 interview, Wilson said he was responsible for naming the series, and when this claim was put to Newman he did not dispute it.

Wilson was responsible for much of the early development work on the show, although he did strongly attempt to dissuade producer Verity Lambert from using writer Terry Nation's script featuring a race of aliens named Daleks. Once the script had been made and transmitted to great success, he called Lambert into his office to tell her that she clearly knew the show better than he did and that he would no longer interfere with her decisions.

== Later career ==
In 1965, Wilson gave up his position as Head of Serials to concentrate on realising a long-held ambition of bringing The Forsyte Saga to the screen. Acting as both adapter and producer, Wilson created one of the BBC’s most popular and successful drama serials of all time, which was a huge hit on its eventual screening on BBC Two in 1967, and was quickly repeated on BBC One. He later acted as adapter and producer again on such prestigious costume dramas as The First Churchills (1969) and Anna Karenina (1977), and also worked for Anglia Television on their series Orson Welles Great Mysteries in 1973.

== Personal life and death ==
In 1938, Wilson married actress Helena Taylor; they had two daughters and were married until her death in 2000.

In retirement, Wilson lived in Kingscote, Gloucestershire, and died from bronchopneumonia and heart failure at Standish Hospital in Standish, Gloucestershire, on 5 March 2002, at the age of 91.
