= Henry Hobhouse =

Henry Hobhouse may refer to:

- Henry Hobhouse (archivist) (1776–1854), English archivist
- Henry Hobhouse (East Somerset MP) (1854–1937), English landowner and Liberal Member of Parliament, 1885–1906
- Henry William Hobhouse (1791–1868), British Member of Parliament for Hereford
- Henry Hobhouse (author) (1924–2016), author of the book Seeds of Change: Five Plants That Transformed Mankind
