= Rosa Waugh Hobhouse =

British social worker and pacifist

Rosa Hobhouse
- Born: Rosa Waugh; 22 June 1882; Sydney House, 33 The Green, Southgate, London, England
- Died: 15 January 1971 (aged 88); Broxbourne, Hertfordshire, England
- Education: Slade School of Art, London
- Occupations: social worker, writer, teacher
- Spouse: Stephen Hobhouse
- Parent(s): Benjamin Waugh, Sarah Boothroyd

Rosa Waugh Hobhouse (1882–1971) was a British social worker and pacifist, who vigorously campaigned for a negotiated end to World War I. She was also a poet, a prolific author and teacher. Described by Sylvia Pankhurst as a ‘Quaker with a mystic temperament’, she spent much of her early adult life living and working among the poor of London’s East End. She wanted a society based on egalitarian principles which had no divisions on the basis of gender, race, class or nation. Towards this goal, Rosa Hobhouse, along with the social activist Mary Hughes and the social reformer Muriel Lester, entered into voluntary poverty as an example of how society could be modelled freed from the constraints and inequalities of class.

== Early life ==
Rosa Waugh was the youngest of Benjamin Waugh and his wife Sarah's 12 children, of whom eight survived to adulthood. She was born on 22 June 1882 in New Southgate, London, but spent most of her childhood in St Albans, at the family home of Otterleigh, Hatfield Road.

Waugh was mainly home tutored by her two eldest sisters, Bertha and Freda. Bertha encouraged her creative writing and poetry. For example, as a teenager Hobhouse compiled a quarterly publication The Scribbler, collections of her own and friends’ stories and rhymes, which she would sell for a penny to family and friends.

Waugh's father was a Congregationalist minister who became increasing involved in protecting the rights of vulnerable young children. In 1884, he co-founded the London Society for the Prevention of Cruelty to Children. Five years later this society became the National Society for the Prevention of Cruelty to Children with Waugh as its first director. Thus, from an early age, Rosa Waugh became acutely aware of social inequalities; reinforced by visits with her sister Bertha to the poor families of St Albans and from working with her mother to raise money for ‘Mrs Waugh’s Hesba home’ founded by Sarah Waugh for frail and sick children of St Albans in memory of her daughter Hesba who had died, aged three years, of meningitis.

== Art school and teaching in London ==
In 1897, at the age of 15, Rosa Waugh began an art school training at the Slade School of Fine Art, London. Her sister Edna, three years older, had already been studying there for four years, and Waugh found herself drawn into her sister’s wide circle of art school friends who included Augustus John, Gwen John, Ambrose McEvoy and Albert Rutherston. Edna (later Edna Clarke Hall) frequently drew Rosa, as did Augustus and Gwen John.

In the autumn of 1903, when her father’s retirement made it necessary for Rosa to earn her own living, she opened a teaching studio for women in a rented two-room apartment in Ealing, London. Rosa structured her syllabus in a similar way to that experienced by students at the Slade. Initially her students were required to ‘draw from the Antique’ (her father gave her two casts of Antique sculptures for her 21st birthday).

When her students had developed sufficient skills in drawing the inanimate body they could progress to Life Drawing. Drawing was taught by Rosa, and painting by Gwen Salmond, a Slade friend; with Augustus John and Albert Rutherston as visiting tutors. Rosa had hoped that her Ealing studio would provide her with a regular income and help build her professional reputation, both as a teacher and practising artist. Reality, however, became something other. Except for a brief upturn during 1906 and 1907, Rosa struggled to attract sufficient students. Letters to her close friend Katie Edith Gliddon are peppered with her worries at earning sufficient to pay the rent on her Ealing studio.

She was forced to undertake other teaching roles; for example she taught drawing part-time for a local boys' school in Ealing, that is, until the spring of 1908 when the school acquired a sports field and decided that the new sports master could also teach drawing! She also worked as a private tutor, tutoring young children in drawing, and also occasionally English and Maths.

Rosa’s experience of teaching drawing led her to develop a new approach to teaching Perspective which she called Natural Perspective. Inspired by a passage in Joseph Conrad’s Mirror of the Sea, describing a seaman’s experience of seeing distant ships, Rosa’s new system emphasised the spectator’s own experience of spatial perception rather than the use of geometrical systems devised to represent it. She gave public lectures on her new ideas on spatial perception and representation.

In 1910, W T Stead published ‘Perspectiveland, or Peggy’s Adventures and how she learnt to draw’; a book which summarised, in an accessible story form for younger children, Rosa’s new system for teaching Perspective.

Although it ultimately proved impossible to earn sufficient from this independent teaching venture, Rosa discovered a love of teaching which she continued to do for much of her adult life. Her studio also gave her a focus of sociability. She became friends with many of her older students: for example with Helen Saunders who not only became a close friend but went on to become a member of the Vorticist movement. Another studio friend, Freda Bayldon, became a miniature painter.

== Teaching in Cardiff ==
In the summer of 1909, exhausted and disillusioned by her continual struggle to earn sufficient money from private teaching, Rosa Waugh decided to close her Ealing studio and applied (successfully) for a permanent position as Teacher of Drawing, Training Department, University College, Cardiff. For the next three years she taught drawing to women training as primary and secondary school teachers, as well as teaching Art at two local schools: the Cathedral Road Girls’ School in Cardiff and a girls’ school in Chepstow run by the du Bochet sisters.

Professionally Rosa’s three years in Cardiff were a fulfilling time, but she felt increasingly out of touch with her family and London friends. In the summer of 1912 Rosa resigned her post. Following her resignation a close friend Louise (Salaman) Bishop gave her financial support for six months’ immersion in various writing projects, for example finishing the writing of a biography of her father, Benjamin Waugh, and also for reflection on her future career plans. For much of this time she lived in Uffington, Berkshire.

Rosa found researching and writing about her father’s philanthropic work a life-changing experience. His life of working for the rights of the poor and dispossessed accorded with her own Christian Socialist principles. It awakened in Rosa a desire to follow her father’s lead and devote herself to working with and among the poor and dispossessed. In the summer of 1913 she began a decade of working and living in London’s East End.

== Living and working in London’s East End ==
Rosa Waugh’s first job was as a Superintendent at an East London Summer Vacation Play Centre, attached to Highway School in the parish of St George in the East, now part of Stepney. There were just Rosa and two other helpers to cope with the 200-300 children that attended each session. Here Rosa began to learn about the lives of those ‘ensnarled by poverty’ which stunted the growth of many of the children who attended the play centre through a protein lacking diet, and robbed many of their younger siblings of their lives.

When the Summer Vacation Play Centre job ended Rosa resolved to stay living and working in the East End. With her meagre earnings Rosa rented a series of rooms locally. Over the next few years she took a series of part-time jobs, such as Superintendent at Dining Centres and evening recreation schools for children, and as a teacher of drawing at the Dame School run by the ‘indefatigable Miss Lavinia Botterill’, and at Myrtle Street Central School; as well as doing voluntary work with various Distress and Care Committees, at a local Juvenile Labour exchange and with the newly formed Probation Service. For a few months she was a Quaker chaplain - to Nellie Best imprisoned for six months in Holloway Prison for anti-conscription activities.

Upon her return to London in 1913 Rosa began to regularly attend Quaker meetings; firstly at the main London Friends’ meeting venue at Devonshire House, Bishopsgate and then locally in Hoxton. Whilst living in Cardiff Rosa had occasionally attended Quaker meetings; a part of her questioning of institutional Christianity. For Rosa it was not enough to preach social justice in sermons and books without taking some practical steps towards creating a more egalitarian society. Thus she had found herself drawn towards the Quaker’s call to live a life of peace, simplicity and equality. Inspired by George Lansbury’s editorials in the Daily Herald, in 1914 Rosa Waugh also joined the Independent Labour Party and was soon regularly speaking at Labour meetings. Indeed in 1915 she was described as ‘one of the most promising of the women of the Independent Labour Party’.

In 1914 Waugh met Muriel Lester and Mary Hughes who became lifelong friends and co-dedicatees to her vision of a society based on Christ’s message of universal love and one which had no division on the basis of class, gender, race or nation. Initially the three lived and worked together towards their shared goal of social equality. In February 1915 Hobhouse and Hughes moved into the two tiny attic bedrooms above the main meeting space of Lester’s newly founded community settlement of Kingsley Hall in Bow. Lester lived close by. Kingsley Hall was an ambitious enterprise that offered support and varied opportunities to the local Bow community with a Montessori inspired nursery school, a men’s school, a lunchtime restaurant for working women and evening activities.

== Marriage ==
In March 1915, at a dinner party for Christian activists, Rosa met Stephen Hobhouse, her future husband: someone similarly committed to working among the dispossessed in London’s East End. Stephen Hobhouse was the eldest son of Henry Hobhouse, a wealthy Somerset landowner and Liberal MP. A decade before Stephen met Rosa, inspired by Tolstoy, he had renounced his heirship to the Somerset estate, in order to devote himself to working with the poor and oppressed in London’s East End. At the time of their meeting Stephen was living (with an Austrian ‘enemy alien’) in a tenement flat in Hoxton, east London. He too was a Quaker and pacifist and, at the time of their meeting, was heavily involved in Quaker led work to support the wives and other dependents of foreign nationals. Three days after the outbreak of WW1 Stephen Hobhouse had set up, and become Chair, of the Friend's’ Emergency Committee which supported the families of British residents of German, Austro-Hungarian and Turkish nationality. Rosa also at this time, more informally, had been assisting wives and dependants of Germans and other European nationalities in the East End of London where local communities were particularly hostile to ‘enemy aliens’.

Six weeks after meeting, on 15 May 1916, Rosa and Stephen Hobhouse were married at the Westminster Friends Meeting House. Following a honeymoon of ‘an hour or two in Regent’s Park’ they caught the bus back to Stephen’s tenement flat at 36 Enfield Buildings, Hoxton to begin their life of ‘voluntary poverty’.

== Voluntary poverty ==
During her years of living in the East End prior to her marriage Rosa had become convinced that in order to achieve social justice, Christians could not simply talk, do an occasional good deed and placate their conscience by giving to worthy causes. Greater life style changes were needed. Rosa believed that the only way she could attain fellowship and understanding with neighbours in the East End and elsewhere was through living a life of similar penury; by giving away what you do not need and entering into a state of ‘voluntary poverty’. Rosa always stressed the importance of distinguishing between the poverty experienced by her neighbours in the East End, which she preferred to describe as ‘compulsory want’ and her own, and other’s self-imposed poverty: hence the term ‘voluntary poverty’

For Rosa and Stephen Hobhouse their life of voluntary poverty involved diverting most of their annual income to helping the local community in various ways. At the time of their marriage Stephen Hobhouse’s parents had set up a Trust Fund for the Hobhouses which generated an income of £250 a year. This income the Hobhouses paid directly into a community Restitution Fund managed by four friends. Initially Rosa and Stephen Hobhouse lived their life of voluntary poverty discreetly, but in 1921 Rosa, along with three friends who had also committed themselves to a life of voluntary poverty, Muriel Lester, Mary Hughes and Stanley James, went public with a call through many of the national newspapers for others to similarly consider the economic basis of their lives, and perhaps also take a vow of voluntary poverty:

We know those who cannot obtain adequate clothing, sheets and warm covering, or necessary food for their children and themselves. The poverty which we refer to is commonly known as a state of privation or destitution. But we prefer to call this condition of theirs compulsory want, being brought upon them by force of hard circumstances. Our invitation to you is not into this enforced poverty, but into a very glorious alternative involving a drastic readjustment in your affairs, called voluntary poverty.

We invite you into this condition, that the needs of others, whether in our country or abroad many generously be supplied by the overflowing of your treasure. We do not here wish to encourage the charity of patronage, but rather the large charity of God, which rejoices in richly providing.

Nor do we desire to indicate the exact consequences of the step into voluntary poverty, into which we invite you. It will suffice to say we have many visions of possible blessing, derived from intimate contact with the sorrows of the oppressed.

They ended their plea by inviting those interested to a meeting at the Kingsley Hall, Bow on Monday 21 March. Their declaration attracted a lot of media publicity and visitors to Kingsley Hall, but few joined them in a life of voluntary poverty. Indeed, a couple of years later Stephen Hobhouse’s precarious state of health resulting from his imprisonment as a Conscientious Objector during WW1 forced Rosa and Stephen to reluctantly renounce their life of voluntary poverty in Hoxton, and to use their private income to maintain themselves away from the East End. Their attempt to ‘unclass’ themselves by entering into voluntary poverty as part of their desire to model a society liberated from the constraints and inequalities of class was ultimately unsustainable for them. But, unlike their East End friends in times of hardship, they were not facing entry into the workhouse: they had the ‘safety net’ of a Trust Fund.

== Pacifism ==
Rosa Hobhouse was strongly opposed to war. For Rosa any form of violence was incompatible with her Christian faith, in which she saw everyone being part of one ‘family’ - ‘God’s family’ - sharing the ‘treasures of creation’. Throughout the First World War Rosa actively campaigned for Peace, arguing for an immediate end to hostilities leading to a negotiated peace. She spoke regularly at meetings and rallies organised by the Fellowship for Reconciliation, No Conscription Fellowship, the Independent Labour Society and other organisations, sharing platforms with other well-known peace activists such as Charlotte Despard, Sylvia Pankhurst and Maude Royden. These meetings were often rowdy, raising passionate and violent reactions in the audiences as, for example, when a hostile anti-German crowd hurled ‘umbrellas and other missiles’ at speakers at a Peace Meeting Rosa was chairing in the courtyard of Devonshire House, Bishopsgate. Similar occurred at Victoria Park, Hackney, at the end of the 1917 Easter Peace procession organised by Sylvia Pankhurst, when a hostile crowd successfully prevented any of the planned speeches from the four platforms erected in the park.

Rosa was one of 180 British women selected to go to the International Peace Conference held in the Hague from 28 to 30 April 1915, but was denied (as were all but twenty five of the selected women) a travel permit as she was not deemed to be of sufficiently ‘well known thought’. In the event, no British delegates managed to journey from the UK to Holland as the government closed the North Sea shipping lanes over the conference period.

If Rosa could not add her voice to the international chorus for peace, she determinedly campaigned nationally for Peace. Concerned about the support church leaders were giving to the war, Rosa wrote an anti-war pamphlet and circulated it to all the bishops of the Church of England and to many prominent Free Church ministers, challenging them at the pamphlet’s beginning:

“In these days, the Spirit saith unto the Churches: ‘Your hands are full of blood. When will ye come out of your ways, and arm yourself with the Mind of Christ?”

Shortly after their marriage, Stephen and Rosa Hobhouse wrote a further Pacifist pamphlet that they regularly distributed in their local streets and at peace meetings. It called upon ‘Men and Women of Vision’ to ‘cease from their present tasks of destruction and to work at once towards the building up of Europe and the world into a peaceful Federation of Co-operative States’. On the 11 May 1916, with fellow peace campaigner Clara Cole, Rosa set out on a ‘kind of peace pilgrimage’ around the Midlands.

== 1916 peace pilgrimage and imprisonment ==
Clara Cole and Rosa Hobhouse set out from Knebworth, Bedfordshire dressed in black ‘rather like the Sisters of Mercy’, as a protest against War. They described themselves as ‘sisters of the World’s Need’. Their aim was to try and ‘create an atmosphere of love and brotherhood between all nationalities, instead of this deplorable feeling of hatred which at present exists and is daily fermented by the press’. They had walked fifty miles, spoken at many impromptu road-side meetings and distributed 2,000 Peace leaflets before being detained by police near Kettering, Northamptonshire on the fifth day of their Pilgrimage. They were charged with ‘having by word of mouth and circular made false statements likely to prejudice the recruiting, training and discipline of the Forces, and with having in their possession at the time of their arrest, without lawful authority, documents, the publication of which was in contravention of Regulation 27 of the Defence of the Realm Act’. From Kettering the two women were sent for trial at Northampton Magistrates Court.

Cole and Hobhouse’s Peace Walk took place at a particular sensitive time for the authorities as the Government had the same month as their walk and trial introduced compulsory conscription for married man 18–41 years of age. At their trial, on the 25 May 1916, Hobhouse and Cole conducted their own defence. Hobhouse spoke out against oppression and bloodshed, whether in the slums or in international relations; explaining how she did not wish ‘to invent conscientious objectors but to appeal to the divine element in every man’. She further explained how Cole and herself, and all Christian activists also had a ‘Realm’ to defend:

“It is very hard for me to understand the spirit behind the 'Defence of the Realm' Act. The only defence I can understand, or desire to take part in, is the defence of the Kingdom of God on earth; and the use of weapons of slaughter in the defence of that Kingdom is unthinkable. Its only true weapons are love and reason. It was because of this faith in me that I set forth on my journey. My other motive was the desire to spread thoughts of peace by negotiation. To negotiate is not to give in, it is simply to use reason instead of force.”

Cole and Hobhouse were found guilty of conduct prejudicial to recruiting and each fined £50. Not considering themselves guilty, they refused to pay the fine or allow it to be paid for them, and so accepted the alternative of three months in Northampton prison. These three months experience served to deepen Hobhouse's convictions as to the injustice of a social system that ‘practically creates the poor criminals’ who were her fellows in Northampton and for the need for prison reform. Before she could galvanise her experience into action, her husband was imprisoned as a Conscientious Objector, and it was to be Stephen who succeeded in initiating major prison reform, inspirited by his own harsh treatment in prison.

== Compulsory conscription ==
Both Rosa and Stephen Hobhouse rejected any kind of war service. They had both been members of the No Conscription Fellowship since its founding in the autumn of 1914. Following the introduction of Conscription in 1916, first, in January, for single men, and then a few months later for married men, they had both worked through the No-Conscription Fellowship, and independently in supporting Conscientious Objectors. In the autumn of 1916 it was Stephen Hobhouse’s turn to be imprisoned for his pacifist beliefs. Failing to respond to his summons to join the regiment, Stephen Hobhouse was arrested in October 1916, court-martialled and sentenced to six months hard labour in Wormwood Scrubs from where after four months he was released and immediately rearrested: the authorities at this time were employing a ‘Cat and Mouse’ treatment, in the hope of breaking the reluctant conscripts’ will. This second time Stephen Hobhouse was court-martialled and sentenced to two years imprisonment with hard labour in Exeter Jail. For long periods he was also in solitary confinement as he refused to obey the ‘Rule of Silence’ which forbad prisoners to speak to each other. Always of a delicate constitution, this prison experience seriously undermined Hobhouse’s health and in December 1917, along with four other conscientious objectors also in poor health, he was released: the authorities fearing the effect on public opinion of their deaths in prison.

== Post-war life ==
For a few years following Stephen Hobhouse’s release from prison Rosa and Stephen continued their life of voluntary poverty in the East End. Rosa was involved with various community projects, and from 1921 worked as a drawing teacher in Stepney, while Stephen Hobhouse, prompted by all he had experienced and witnessed during his fourteen months imprisonment, devoted his time and energies to accumulating evidence for and editing a major report on conditions in prison. The report was published in 1922, and prompted reforms which continue today. However shortly before its publication Stephen realised he was on the brink of a nervous breakdown, and handed the final stages of preparing the report to a friend, Fenner Brockway, also imprisoned for his conscientious objection, whilst he fled London, realising he could never return; that Rosa and his days of living amidst the poor of the East End were over. For the next year, while Rosa continued teaching and living in Hoxton, her husband explored the possibility of earning his living as an untrained, though not entirely inexperienced gardener, lodging with friends in various country locations. However, it soon became apparent that Stephen Hobhouse with his undermined constitution did not have sufficient physical health for such sustained hard labour. Rosa consequently resigned her Stepney job, gave up the tenancy on their Hoxton flat and joined her husband for a year at Ditchling, East Sussex where he had found employment with the St Dominic’s Press, editing Greek and Latin texts. From 1924 until 1929 they lived in Stanford-le-Hope, Essex.

In Stanford-le-Hope they rented a small bungalow in the grounds of Moore Place, a Christian Socialist community. In the acre of land surrounding the bungalow they grew their own fruit and vegetable, tended their hens and tried to earn a living from their writings; Rosa more successfully than Stephen whose writings were of too scholarly a nature to yield much income. During their years living and working in the East End, Rosa had become well known as an engaging story teller for children. At Kingsley Hall, in schools or various Children’s Play Centres Rosa had told stories about the Man with the Leather Patch and other characters. These stories she now gathered into a series of story books, illustrating them herself. Rosa shared her experience as a Story Teller through workshops and a book entitled ‘Story Making’: a how-to guide for those who wanted to or were engaged in story telling. Rosa also regularly contributed articles on story making to a diverse range of magazines and journals and was a frequent lecturer on the art of story telling at educational conferences and meetings of a wide variety of different organisations.

Despite their strenuous efforts Rosa and Stephen Hobhouse could not earn enough to supply even their modest needs, and so they finally abandoned their efforts to live independently of the unearned income from their Marriage trust. They also accepted a legacy in 1929 from Stephen’s aunt, Kate Courteney (1847-1929), a pacifist and lifelong campaigner for social justice. With this legacy they bought a house in Broxbourne, Hertfordshire. Rosa became active in local politics, though repeatedly failed to be elected as a Local Labour Councillor in an area of staunch Conservative sympathies. For many years she worked as a local Magistrate. Writing continued to be an important focus of both Rosa and Stephen Hobhouse’s lives. Rosa wrote biographies of her friend and fellow worker in the East End, Mary Hughes; and also of the ‘Father of Homeopathy’, Christian Samuel Hahnemann. The seeds of Rosa’s interest in and practice of homeopathic medicine had been sown during childhood by her mother who used homeopathic remedies to treat the childhood ailments of her large family. In later life, Rosa came to view allopathic medicine as a form of violence against the body in its use of drugs and surgical instruments. She became a certificated practitioner and compiled several successful handbooks on homeopathic treatment. Rosa also published five volumes of her poetry.

Rosa Hobhouse died on the 15 January 1971; outliving her husband by almost ten years.

== Writings ==
- Perspectiveland, or, Peggy’s adventures and how she learnt to draw. Stead’s Publishing House, London. 1910
- Life of Benjamin Waugh. T. F Unwin, London. 1913
- Story Making. Methuen, London. 1923
- The Divine Art of Healing, C.W.Daniel, London. 1926
- The Diary of a Story Maker. The Sign of the Willow, Ditchling, 1928
- The Man with the Leather Patch & Five Other Tales. The Sign of the Willow, Ditchling. 1928
- Robin Hood and other Tales of Old England. J. M. Dent & Sons. London. 1931
- Poems. E Matthews & Marrot. 1931
- Norse Legends Retold from the Eddas (The Kings Treasuries of Literature No 186). J.M.Dent & Sons, London. 1932
- Life of Christian Samuel Hahnemann. C.W.Daniel, London. 1933
- The Records of Senelder: An Old History Imagined. C.W.Daniel, London. 1940
- Mary Hughes, her Life for the Disposed. Rockcliff, London. 1949
- The old Myths and Hiistories of Norway, Sweden and Denmark. J.M.Dent & Sons, London. 1949
- Out of the Years. The Ditchling Press 1953
- Undine and Althea. Privately published. 1955
- New Poems. Privately published. 1960
- Intimations of personality: A Brief Study of Stephen Hobhouse. Thomas Knight & Co, Hoddesdon, Herts. 1965
- As Gems in Metal. J.M.Dent & Co, London. 1967

Hobhouse contributed to The Tribunal, New Crusader, The Ploughshare, The Dreadnought, The Schoolmistress, Education, Child Education, Education Outlook, The Road, The Teachers of Today, The Sunday school, The Architect, The Lady, Poetry of Today, Poetry Review, The New Leader, The Road, The Plough-share.
