= Catherine Courtney, Baroness Courtney of Penwith =

British social worker and internationalist

The Right Honourable The Lady Courtney of Penwith
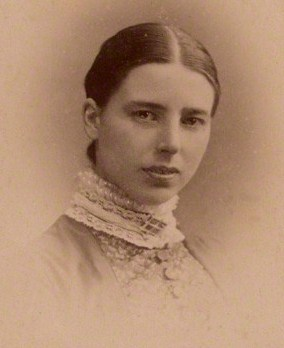
- Catherine Courtney in 1883
- Born: Catherine Potter; 4 April 1847; Herefordshire, England
- Died: 26 February 1929 (aged 81); Chelsea, London, England
- Other name: Kate Courtney
- Occupation: Social worker
- Known for: Activism
- Spouse: Leonard Courtney, 1st Baron Courtney of Penwith (m. 1883)
- Parent(s): Richard Potter; Laurencina Heyworth

Catherine Courtney, Baroness Courtney of Penwith (née Potter; 4 April 1847 – 26 February 1929), known as Kate Courtney, was a British social worker and internationalist. Active in charitable organisations in her early life, she later campaigned with her husband Leonard Courtney to end the Second Boer War and the First World War. She sought to bring attention to the plight of citizens of the enemy nations and was denounced as being overly sympathetic to the enemy during both wars.

== Early life ==
Catherine Potter was born at Gayton Hall, Herefordshire. She was the second daughter of the businessman Richard Potter and his wife Lawrencina (née Heyworth), daughter of a Liverpool merchant. Her seven younger sisters included the social reformer Beatrice Webb, Baroness Passfield, while Charles Cripps, 1st Baron Parmoor, and Henry Hobhouse were among her brothers-in-law. Mostly educated at home by tutors, she briefly attended a London boarding school for girls in the 1860s. She was not regarded as particularly clever or beautiful, and strongly disliked seasons and socialising with the upper class. After her coming out party in 1865, she strived for independence and resisted her parents' attempts to marry her off.

== Work in the slums ==
In 1875, after a particularly difficult year, the 28-year-old Kate Potter left her family home and went to London to enlist in the activities of Octavia Hill and started training for the Charity Organization Society in Whitechapel, as well as working as an organiser of an East End boys' clubs, before joining Samuel Augustus and Henrietta Barnett in their philanthropic work. Her parents frowned upon her decision, as did her elder sister Lawrencina, but ultimately granted her a small allowance which enabled her to settle in Great College Street in Westminster. She stayed in touch with her family and they often complained about her forcing them to attend "poor people's parties", which they escaped as soon as they could.

For the next eight years, she worked at St Jude's Church, Whitechapel. As Hill's full-time aide from 1876 until 1883, Kate Potter's duties included running youth clubs and collecting rents. The tight work schedule that she maintained, helped her to avoid dealing with her family's expectations. Her friendliness made her popular even as a rent collector, and she eventually managed to persuade her sisters Theresa and Beatrice to join her. In 1884, model dwellings in Aldgate in which she worked, were named after her – Katharine Buildings. She was a member of the London Survey Committee, a voluntary organisation publishing architectural surveys of the capital.

== Marriage ==
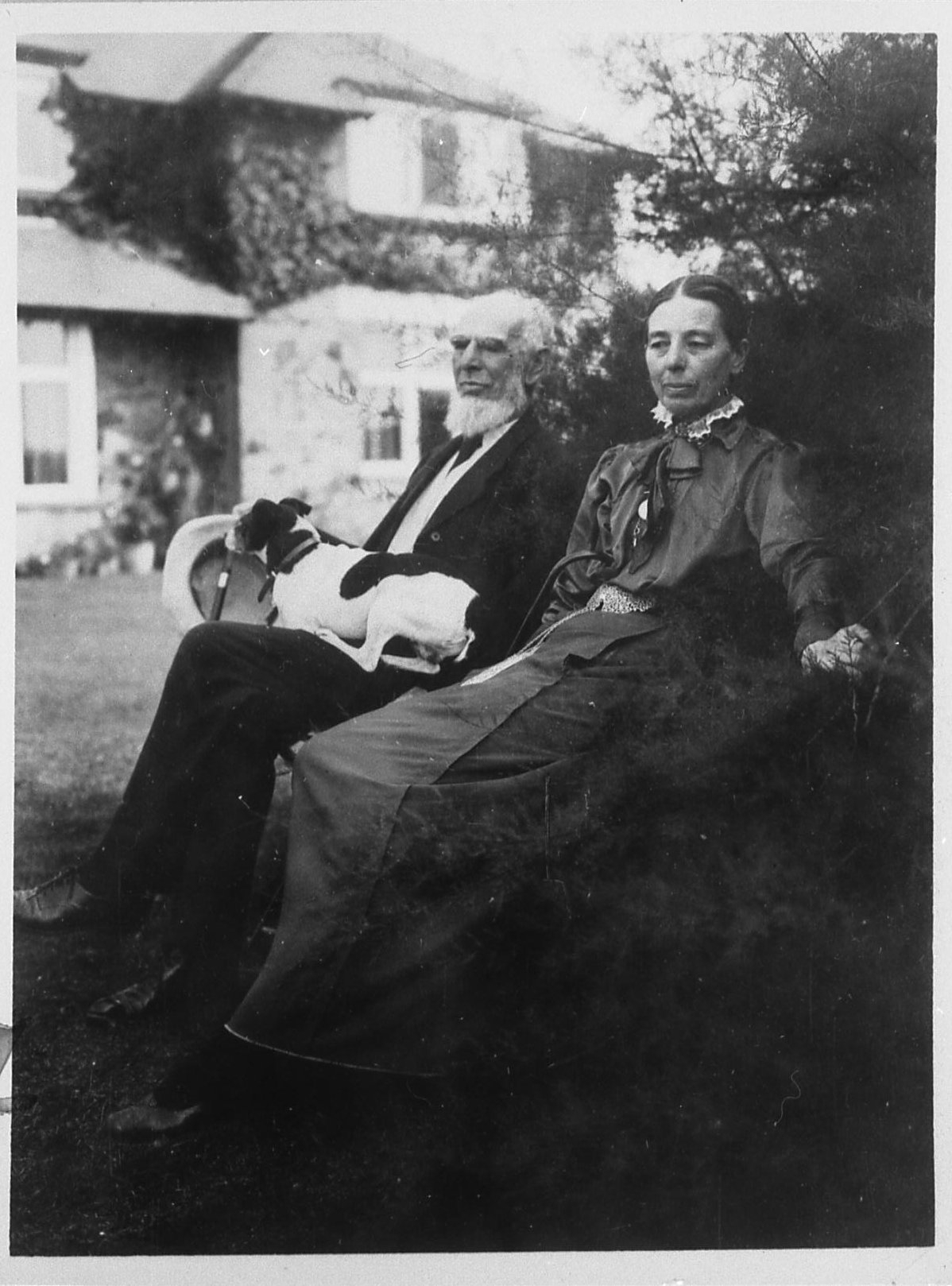
Lord and Lady Courtney in 1916

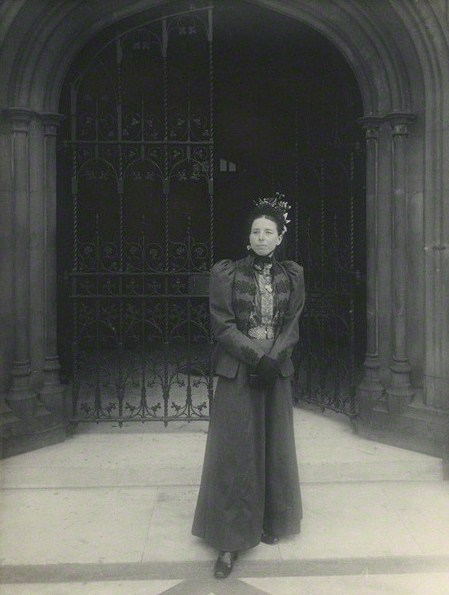
Catherine Courtney in 1898, by Sir John Benjamin Stone

Catherine Potter met the 48-year-old Leonard Courtney, then Liberal cabinet minister, in 1880, and became friends with him at Charles Booth's dinner parties. Potter and Courtney married on 15 March 1883. Both were Quakers and they were happily married for 35 years. Despite their hopes to have children and Catherine's fertility operation in 1888, the couple remained childless. Under her husband's influence, she became a suffragist and Liberal Unionist. Marriage, however, required her to relinquish her earlier activities for the sake of homemaking and supporting her husband's career. They founded the South Africa Conciliation Committee in 1899. In the 1890s, she became leader of the Women's Liberal Unionist Association but was disappointed by its conservatism and imperialism and resigned from the association's committee on 24 October 1900. Meanwhile, the Courtneys were significant supporters of the Zulu welfare activist Harriette Colenso, daughter of Bishop John Colenso.

== Wartime activities ==
The Courtneys actively campaigned for world peace. They were accused of being "pro-Boers" during the Second Boer War, receiving anonymous threatening letters, and Catherine was called "pro-Hun" after the First World War by the Daily Sketch. She actively supported negotiating the end of both wars, joining the 1899 armistice campaign of Emily Hobhouse, and later aligning herself with Jane Addams' attempts to negotiate peace during the First World War, with the help of neutral nations.

Throughout 1901, she visited South Africa to report on conditions inside the concentration camps built for Boer civilians. In 1906, her husband was elevated to peerage and she became Baroness Courtney of Penwith. Lady Courtney championed the "innocent enemies" of the First World War and participated in the founding of an emergency committee aimed at helping German civilians living in Britain. She visited German prisoners of war and publicised the work of her German counterparts in Berlin. She unsuccessfully pleaded with the Home Office to prevent German aliens from being deported back to Germany.

== Widowhood and death ==
Lady Courtney was widowed in May 1918. In January the next year, she hosted the first meeting of the Fight the Famine Committee at her home in Cheyne Walk; the Save the Children Fund developed from that committee. Along with her former brother-in-law, Lord Parmoor, Lady Courtney campaigned for ending the blockade of Germany. She wrote to The Daily News in 1920, saying that "somebody must begin to be good if the better world we were promised is ever to come". She died in Cheyne Walk in 1929 and was buried at Chelsea Old Church.

== Family tree ==
Richard Potter	Lawrencina Potter
Catherine Courtney	Leonard Courtney	Theresa Cripps	Charles Cripps	Marian Cripps	Margaret Hobhouse	Henry Hobhouse	Beatrice Webb	Sidney Webb
Stafford Cripps	Stephen Hobhouse	Arthur Hobhouse
