= Richard Potter (businessman) =

English barrister and businessman investor

Richard Potter (23 July 1817 – 11 January 1892) was a Victorian era English barrister and businessman investor, later chairman of the Great Western Railway.

== Background ==
Potter was the son of Richard Potter, the radical non-conformist Liberal Party MP for Wigan, and founding member of the Little Circle. His uncle was Thomas Potter, the first Lord Mayor of Manchester. His father and uncle were successful businessmen, and investors in John Edward Taylor's new Manchester Guardian newspaper. Their second formation of the Little Circle resulted in pressure being brought to eventually pass the Reform Act 1832.

== Early life ==
Richard Potter was born on 23 July 1817 in Ashton-under-Lyne, Lancashire, the son of Richard Potter and Mary Seddon. Brought up a Unitarian, his father held the seat of Wigan until 1839, replaced by the Radical party's William Ewart. He then moved the family to Gloucester, where he unsuccessfully lost the contest to represent the constituency to Maurice Berkeley, 1st Baron FitzHardinge. Richard Potter Snr died in July 1842.

== Business career ==
After being admitted to the bar in 1840, Potter invested in the timber importing firm Price & Co. based in Gloucester. At the time, the Gloucester Docks served as a major inland port and a significant center for timber trade in Southwest England.

=== Price & Co. ===
From 1849 Price & Co. became involved in supplying timber to William Eassie, who was supplying railway sleepers to the Gloucester and Dean Forest Railway. Eassie's company diversified after the railway boom period, supplying windows and doors, as well as prefabricated wooden huts to the gold prospectors in Australia.

With the outbreak of the Crimean War in 1854, the Government wanted to provide shelter as winter advanced. Potter suggested sending out similar prefabricated wooden huts to Eassie, to which Price & Co. secured an order for 500 huts from the British Army, a similar number to those supplied by a contractor in Portsmouth. Eassie's team designed huts to accommodate 20 to 30 men lying feet to feet, with a 4 feet (1.2 m) passage down the centre. The finally produced huts were 28 feet (8.5 m) long by 16 feet (4.9 m) wide, with a single door and window at one end and two sliding windows at the other end.

Potter then travelled to France and obtained an order from Emperor Napoleon III for a further 1,850 huts to a slightly modified design. French Army soldiers arrived in Gloucester Docks in December 1854 to learn how to erect the huts. Supply was delayed by the need to transfer the resultant packs from broad gauge to standard gauge tracks, with the last packs shipped from Southampton Docks in January 1855.

After finishing the French project, Isambard Kingdom Brunel approached Price & Co. about producing a hospital, as had been agreed between the Government and Florence Nightingale. Brunel designed a unit ward to house 50 patients, 90 feet (27 m) long by 40 feet (12 m) wide, divided into two wards, with toilets and stores. Brunel then designed the 1,000 patient Renkioi Hospital, using 60 of the Price & Co. units. After Eassie Snr had seen the awful state of construction of the British Army huts at Balaklava, he sent his son to supervise the construction of the hospital. Construction was being finalised when hostilities ceased in April 1856.

In August 1855, the Price & Co./Eassie partnership received a further order from the Government for an improved design of barrack hut. Between September and October 1855, over 6,800 tons of hut kits were shipped direct from Gloucester Docks to Balaklava, to avoid the delay in rail travel to Southampton.

== Railways ==
In 1849, Potter joined the board of the Great Western Railway. An unpopular character, Potter resigned from the GWR board for the first time in 1856.

In 1860 he became the first chairman of the Gloucester Railway Carriage and Wagon Company, and an investor and director of the West Midland Railway (WMR). When the WMR amalgamated with the GWR in 1863, Potter returned to the GWR Board, quickly elected as chairman. During his period in office he consolidated the GWR stocks, and introduced a superannuation fund for the entire workforce. Potter resigned for a second time in 1865 because the work was preventing attention to his private affairs.

The passing of the British North America Act, 1867 included the provision for an Intercolonial Railway to link with the Grand Trunk Railway at Rivière-du-Loup. In 1869, as part of his investment in the Grand Trunk Railway and its proposed recovery after the American Civil War, he lived in Boston. He also lived in New York for a period in 1874.

== Politics ==
In 1864, Potter was canvassed as a potential parliamentary candidate for Pembroke Boroughs.

== Family ==
Potter married Laurencina Heyworth, daughter of Liverpool merchant Lawrence Heyworth and his wife Elizabeth (née Aked), on 13 August 1844 at St. Mary the Virgin church in West Derby, Lancashire. The couple had ten children:

- Lawrencina (1845–1906), who married Robert Durning Holt
- Catherine Courtney, Baroness Courtney of Penwith (1847–1929), social worker and internationalist
- Mary Elizabeth (1849–1923)
- Georgina (1850–1914), on 11 September 1873 she married Daniel Meinertzhagen, of Brookwood Park, Alresford, Hampshire, and 12 Tokenhouse Yard, London, he died 5 June 1910 at Brookwood Park.
- Blanche (1851–1905)
- Theresa (1852–1893), first wife of Charles Cripps, 1st Baron Parmoor
- Margaret Heyworth (1854–1921), who married Henry Hobhouse
- Beatrice Webb, Baroness Passfield (1858–1943), social reformer
- Richard (1862–1864)
- Rosalind (1865–1949), mother of Kitty Muggeridge.

Almost all of Potter's children, in-laws, and grandchildren became well known.

Richard Potter	Lawrencina Potter
Catherine Courtney	Leonard Courtney	Theresa Cripps	Charles Cripps	Marian Cripps	Margaret Hobhouse	Henry Hobhouse	Beatrice Webb	Sidney Webb
Stafford Cripps	Stephen Hobhouse	Arthur Hobhouse

== Standish House and The Argoed, Penalt ==
The family initially lived at Hempsted, Gloucestershire. From 1853, Potter leased Standish House and the surrounding 30 acres (12 ha) of grounds, located in Standish, Gloucestershire, from James Dutton, 3rd Baron Sherborne. The Potter family moved into the house, and the couple's later three daughters and their son were born there.

Potter developed the gardens along managed Victorian era principles, building extensive heated greenhouses to allow the family to eat well. It eventually provided a ready supply of grapes, plus a dedicated mushroom house and watercress beds. A drilled spring provided a steady year round stream, which was landscaped to provide a pond by construction of a brickwall dam. Beneath the dam there was an ice store, allowing year roud supplies of ice.

In 1865, Potter bought, The Argoed, a 17th-century house at Penallt, Monmouthshire.

== Death ==
In 1882, Lawrencina died and the remaining family members moved out of Standish House. Richard moving to Box House in Minchinhampton, where he died on 1 January 1892.
