= Seeds of Change =

Seeds of Change may refer to:

- Seeds of Change (album), a solo album by Kerry Livgren
- Seeds of Change (company), an organic seed and food company
- Seeds of Change (novel), 1975 science fiction by Thomas F. Monteleone
- Seeds of Change (non-fiction book), a 1985 book by Henry Hobhouse
- "Seeds of Change", a song on the 2019 Joe Lovano album Trio Tapestry
