= Henry Hobhouse (author) =

English sailor, broadcaster, journalist, farmer, author and politician

- Born: 24 December 1924; Lamyat, Somerset, England
- Died: 5 March 2016 (aged 91)
- Education: Eton College
- Occupations: Broadcaster, journalist, farmer, author, politician
- Known for: Seeds of Change: Five Plants That Transformed Mankind
- Spouses: Frances Liedloff; Pamela Hill; Bridget Brooks
- Children: 5, including Janet Hobhouse and Will Hobhouse
- Parent: Sir Arthur Hobhouse
- Relatives: Stephen Henry Hobhouse (uncle); Henry Hobhouse (MP) (grandfather); Richard Potter (great grandfather)

Henry Hobhouse (24 December 1924 – 5 March 2016), was an English sailor, broadcaster, journalist, farmer, author, and politician, best known for his book Seeds of Change: Five Plants That Transformed Mankind.

== Early life ==
Henry Hobhouse was known as "Tom" to distinguish him from his grandfather, a well-known Liberal politician also named Henry Hobhouse. He was born at Lamyat, Somerset in 1924 and was the second child of Arthur Hobhouse, Liberal MP for Wells and the architect of Britain’s National Park system. His uncle was the religious writer and peace activist Stephen Henry Hobhouse.

He was educated at Eton, but ran away at 17 in 1942 to join the Merchant Navy, where he was involved in the Atlantic convoy, and soon transferred to the Royal Navy, where he saw the D-Day landing whilst working on the Operation Pluto underwater pipeline.

== Career ==
After the war, Hobhouse found work with CBS, as one of US television's earliest on-screen news reporters, before becoming a newspaper journalist in the US, for the Wall Street Journal. He returned to the UK and worked for The Economist, and The Daily Express.

In the 1950s, he moved back to Somerset, where he spent the rest of life running a farm on the family estate, and became a Conservative Party county councillor in the 1980s. He was chairman of the county council from 1989 to 1992.

His 1985 book, Seeds of Change: Five Plants That Transformed Mankind, shows how the history of the world since Columbus "discovered" America has been changed by five plants: sugar, tea, cotton, the potato, and the cinchona (source of quinine). His obituary in The Guardian noted that "Seeds of Change altered the way we understand modern history".

In the 1999 second edition of the book, Seeds of Change: Six plants that transformed mankind, Hobhouse added the coca plant to the list. In 2003, he published a follow-up book Seeds of Wealth: Four Plants That Made Men Rich covering timber, wine, rubber, and tobacco.

== Personal life ==
His first wife was the American sculptor Frances Liedloff, and their daughter, Janet Hobhouse, became an author and biographer of Gertrude Stein.

His second wife was Pamela Hill. They married in 1954 and had four sons together, including the businessman Will Hobhouse. She died in 1981. In 1987 he married Bridget Brooks, who survives him.

At his funeral, the eulogy was given by his godson, the Tory MP Jacob Rees-Mogg.
