= Kate Courtney =

Kate Courtney may refer to:

- Kate Courtney (cyclist) (born 1995), American cyclist
- Catherine Courtney, Baroness Courtney of Penwith (1847–1929), British social worker and internationalist
