= Newark Park =

Historic hunting Lodge near Ozleworth, Gloucestershire, England

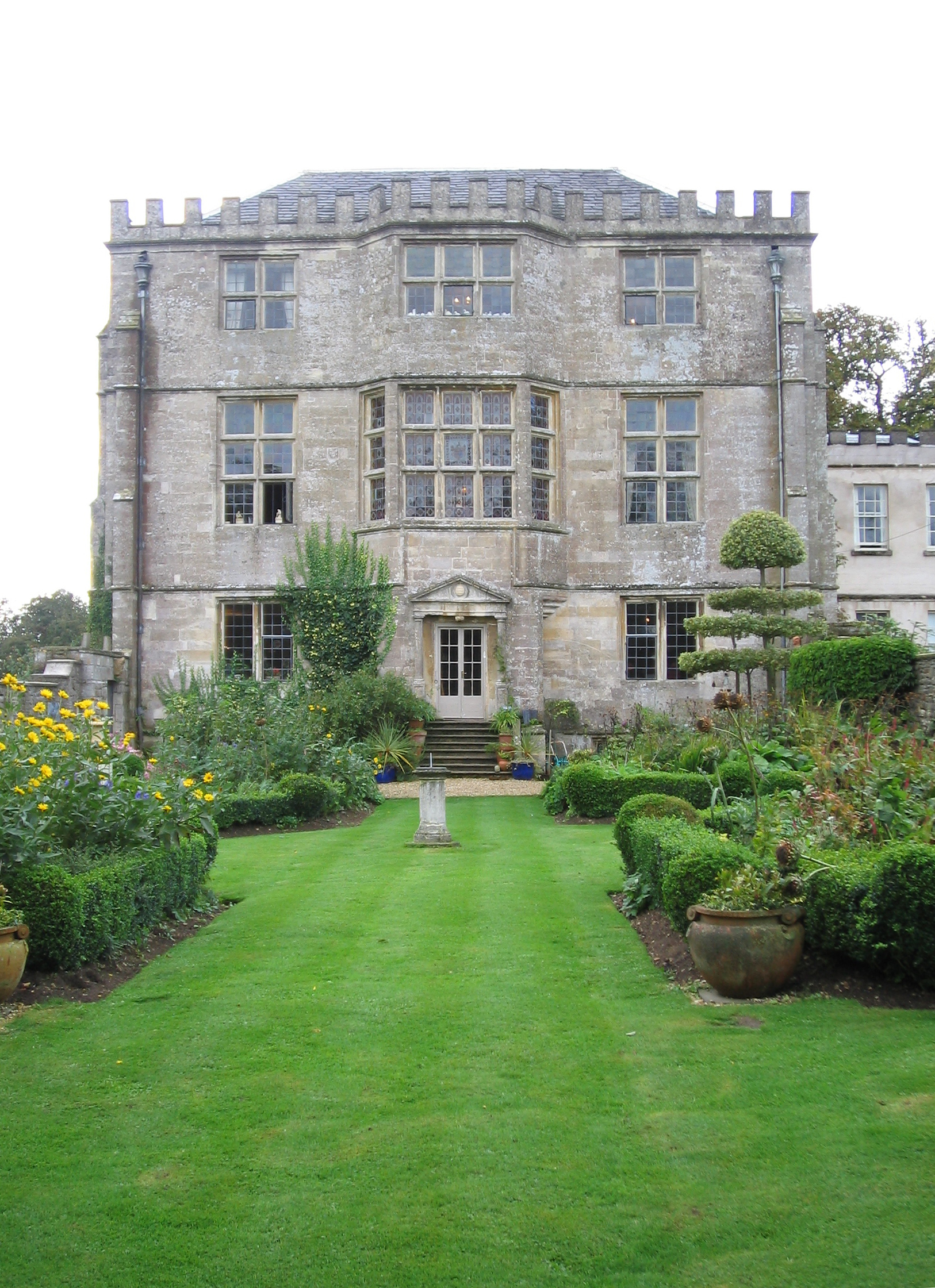
- The symmetrical front of the original lodge

- Location within Gloucestershire
- 51°38′11″N 2°19′04″W
- Type: Hunting Lodge
- Location: Ozleworth
- OS grid reference: ST 78107 93111

Site notes
- Area: Gloucestershire
- Owner: National Trust

Listed Building – Grade I
- Official name: Newark Park, Ozleworth
- Designated: 6 Sep 1954
- Reference no.: 1227685

Newark Park is a Grade I listed country house of Tudor origins located near the village of Ozleworth, Wotton-under-Edge, Gloucestershire, England. The house sits in an estate of 700 acres (2.8 km^{2}) at the southern end of the Cotswold escarpment with views down the Severn Valley to the Severn Estuary. The house and estate have been in the care of the National Trust since 1946.

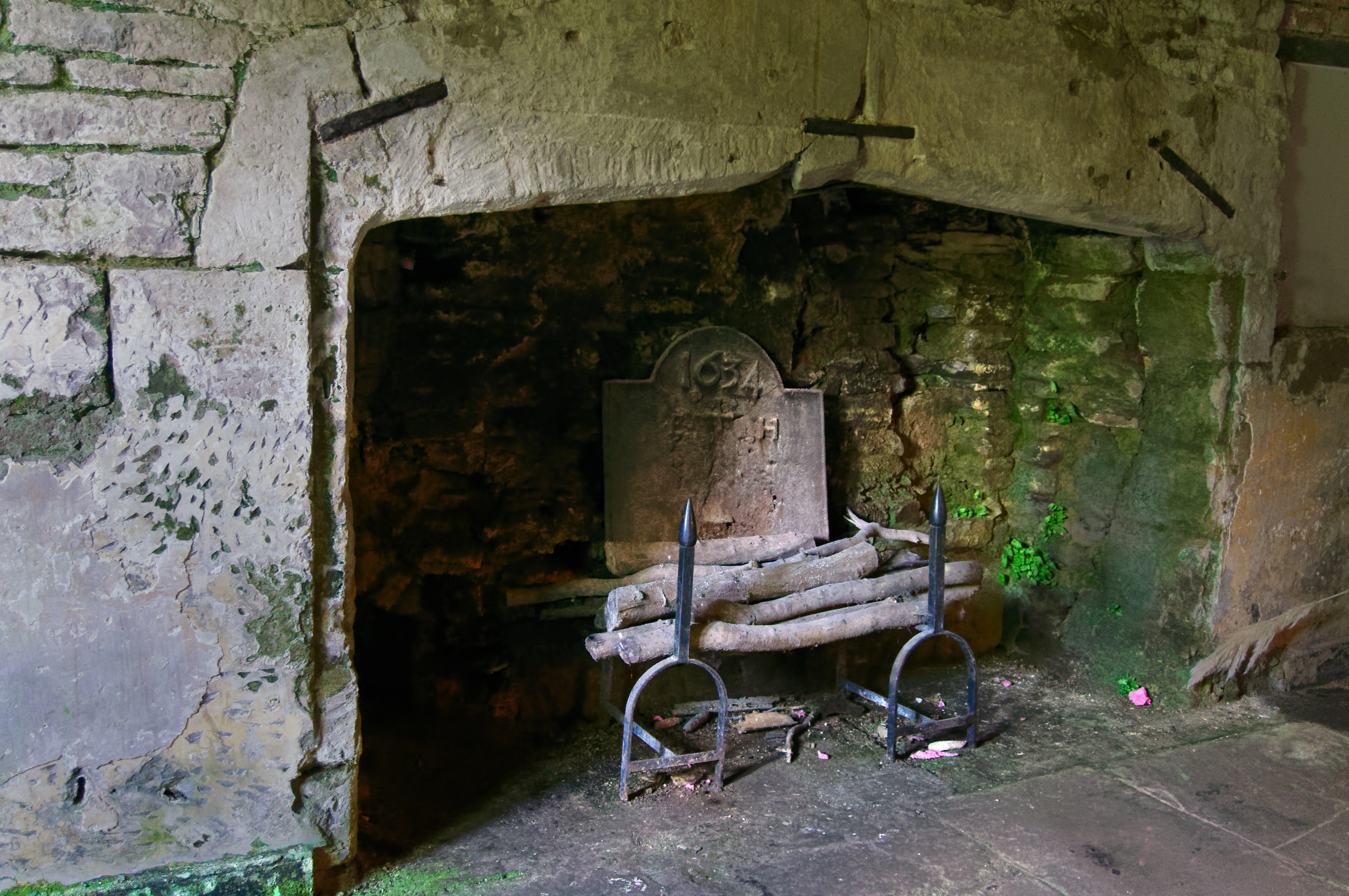
Basement kitchen at Newark Park

== History ==
Newark Park was originally a four-storey (three storeys over a basement) Tudor hunting lodge built between 1544 and 1556 for Sir Nicholas Poyntz (d.1557), whose main seat was at Acton Court near Bristol, some fifteen miles to the south, an easy day's ride. The Poyntz family were anciently feudal barons of Curry Mallet in Somerset, later of Iron Acton in Gloucestershire. Poyntz was a Groom of the Privy Chamber to Henry VIII and had recently remodeled Acton Park in anticipation of a royal visit. "Newark is equally fashionable in terms of its precocious classicism," observes Nicholas Cooper, who points out its rigorously symmetrical front (illustration), unprecedented in the main body of any great house in its time, and the correct Tuscan order of its original main door. The house was then called "New Work" and was partly constructed with building materials from the recently dissolved Kingswood Abbey, some five miles away. The lodge was three bays wide and of single-pile construction, one room deep. In the basement was a kitchen, there were two reception rooms on the ground floor and a banqueting room on the first. Modest sleeping quarters were provided on the third floor, and the roof was flat so that it could be used as a pleasurable lookout over the surrounding countryside, in which it enjoys a commanding position. It was built at about the same time as nearby Siston Court was being built by Sir Maurice Denys (d.1563), first cousin of Poyntz's wife Jane Berkeley. Poyntz's original lodge now forms the eastern part of the present structure.

In 1600 the lodge was sold to the Low family of London who in 1672 significantly extended the building by the addition of a second four-storey building to the west, which was joined to the original by a passage stairway creating an H-shaped footprint. The Lows owned Newark Park until 1722 when it was sold for £6,010 (equivalent to £1,150,000 today) to the Harding family who after making some minor alterations sold it to James Clutterbuck. The Clutterbucks engaged the architect James Wyatt to remodel it into a four-square house in 1790. Their improvements included the creation of a formal deer-park to the south of the house and landscaping of the rest of the grounds.

The Clutterbucks left Newark in 1860 and let it out, but even though it was tenanted the occupants continued to make alterations and improvements. Mrs Annie Poole King, widow of a Bristol shipping merchant took the leasehold in 1898, moving from the larger Standish House at Stonehouse, Gloucestershire. A member of the Berkeley Hunt, she had five children, plus a house staff of a coachman, cook, housekeeper, and gardener. The King family added servants' quarters on the north side, installed a hot-air heating system and ran hot water to the second floor. The Kings stayed at Newark until 1949 when the last of the line died and the then owner, Mrs Power-Clutterbuck, gave Newark Park and its estates to the National Trust.

== Conservation and listing ==
When the Trust took ownership they did not open Newark Park to the public but instead let it out to tenants who ran it as a nursing home. By 1970 the house was in a state of disrepair and the gardens overgrown. It was in this state that American architect Robert (Bob) Parsons (1920–2000), who had long expressed a desire to take on an English country house in need of repair, took the tenancy and began a painstaking programme of renovation, conservation and rehabilitation to both the house and the grounds. It was due to Bob Parson's efforts that the architectural importance of the house was acknowledged and the Grade I listing achieved. Parson's partner, Michael Claydon, moved to Newark Park in 1982 and became actively involved in the ongoing restoration. After Parson's death in 2000, Claydon maintained stewardship of the house and continued restoration works in the landscaped parkland.

== Public Access ==
The property is now open to the public in summer every day and weekends in winter.
