= Edna Clarke Hall =

Watercolour artist, etcher and lithographer

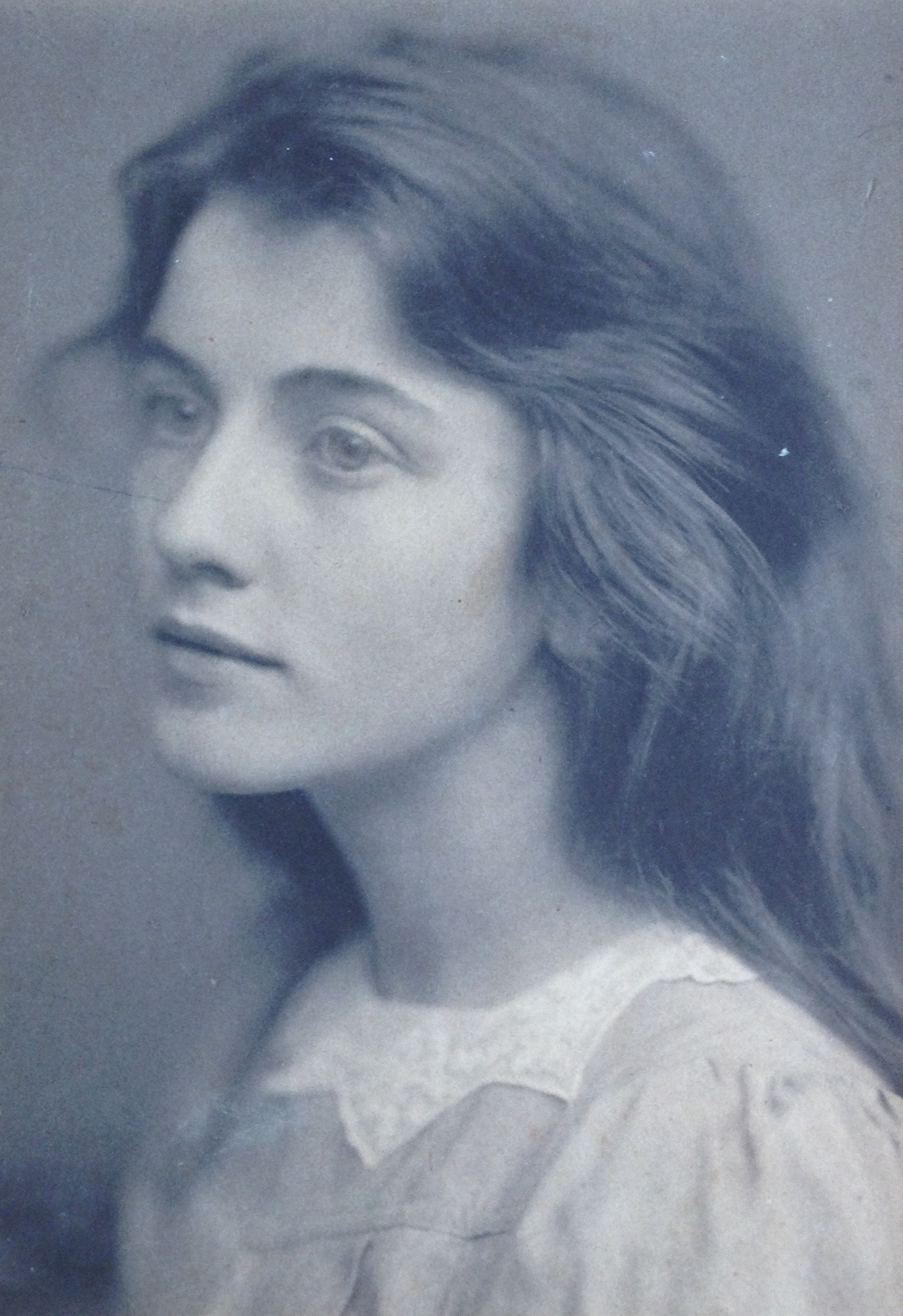
- Edna Clarke Hall, 1895
- Born: Edna Waugh; 29 June 1879; Shipbourne, Kent, England
- Died: 16 November 1979 (aged 100); Deal, Kent, England
- Education: Slade School of Art
- Known for: drawing, painting, etching, lithography, poetry
- Spouse: William Clarke Hall (m. 1898; died 1932)

Edna Clarke Hall (née Waugh; 29 June 1879 – 16 November 1979) was a watercolour artist, etcher, lithographer and draughtsman who is mainly known for her many illustrations to Wuthering Heights by Emily Brontë.

== Early life and education ==
Born Edna Waugh in Shipbourne, a tiny village in the Kent hop fields, she was the tenth of the twelve children of the social campaigner Benjamin Waugh who was a cofounder of the National Society for the Prevention of Cruelty to Children (NSPCC). In 1881, the Waughs moved to Southgate, and in 1889, after her father resigned the ministry to dedicate himself to the NSPCC, the family settled in St Albans, Hertfordshire.

The young Edna Waugh showed an early talent for drawing. When she was fourteen, a barrister friend of her father, William Clarke Hall (1866–1932), arranged for her to enter the Slade School of Fine Art. Whilst there, Edna was taught by Henry Tonks, "the most renowned and formidable teacher of his generation". She studied alongside Gwen and Augustus John, Ida Nettleship, Ambrose McEvoy and Albert Rutherston, and made many drawings and etchings of her new friends. She won many prizes and certificates for her drawings and in 1897 was awarded a Slade scholarship. Although a couple of oil paintings, painted under Gwen John's guidance, exist, Edna's favoured medium as a painter was watercolour. The mediums watercolour and pen and ink were what Edna preferred to work with, as they fulfilled her instinctive needs and carefulness. Using her everyday life as inspiration, she drew ideas from her lived reality, creating works of art focusing on the process, rather than the result.

== Marriage ==
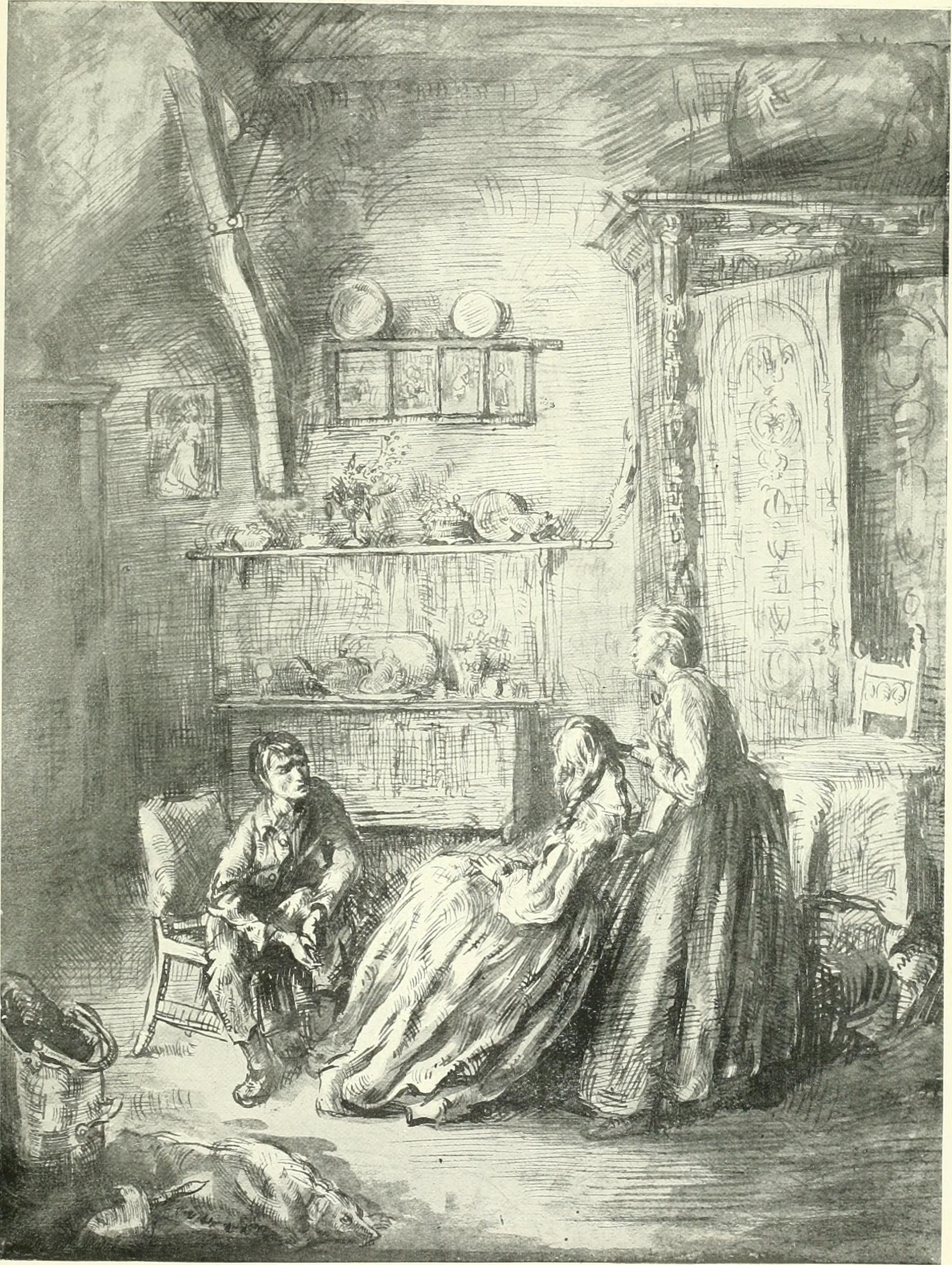
Etching by Clarke Hall showing a scene from Wuthering Heights, 1907

The 19-year-old Edna married William Clarke Hall on 22 December 1898. Although he had previously encouraged and supported his wife's studies, there were tensions between Edna's artistic ambitions and her husband's expectation that she conform to a traditional wifely role. For the next two decades, Edna Clarke Hall's art became a very personal activity only shared with close friends and occasionally shown in group exhibitions. Shortly after their marriage, the Clarke Halls rented a sixteenth-century house called 'Great Tomkins' on Upminster Common. This house reminded Edna of Wuthering Heights by Emily Brontë, inspiring the first of the many illustrations of scenes from the novel that she would create. For the rest of her artistic life Clarke Hall added to the Wuthering Heights drawings and etchings during periods of emotional crisis. They portrayed scenes such as the distraught Catherine crying for the absent Heathcliff and Heathcliff supporting the dying Catherine. One of her drawings of the latter scene was inscribed with the quote 'Let me alone! If I've done wrong, I'm dying for it'. When adding illustrations to Wuthering Heights, she drew ideas from her own life frictions and found them worthy for material. With that she was able to make about 247 illustrations that still remain published. Feeling sympathy for Catherine, saying that she lived the characters, she simply was them, feeling like Catherine and Heathcliff were a representation of her and William Clarke Hall .

Apart from Wuthering Heights, Edna's sons, Justin (b. 1905) and Denis (1910–2006) were key subjects for her art. She frequently painted them whilst they were otherwise absorbed in their own pursuits, creating tender yet unsentimental portraits, typically in watercolour.

In 1914, Henry Tonks persuaded his former pupil to hold a one-woman show at the Chenil Galleries in London. This show was a critical success, with one review describing her as a 'sensitive and expressive draughtswoman who reaches a masterly plane' and admiring her 'individual and instinctive' use of colour.

== Breakdown and artistic identity ==
Edna Clarke Hall suffered a nervous breakdown in 1919. Through the assistance of Tonks and the psychologist Henry Head she addressed some of the problems with her marriage and was able to reassert her artistic identity. In 1922 her husband set up a studio in South Square, Gray's Inn, where she could work. Between 1924 and 1941 she exhibited regularly at the Redfern Gallery in London. Her 1926 show led to the Times's art critic declaring her 'the most imaginative artist in England'.

Edna Clarke Hall wrote and published two volumes of poetry, Poems (1926) and Facets (1930). Three of her 'Poem Pictures', which merged illustration and text in a manner reminiscent of William Blake, appear as lithographs in Facets.

William Clarke Hall was knighted in 1932 for his work towards reforming child law, at which point his wife became Lady Clarke Hall, but he died later that year. A trust was formed by Mrs F. Samuel, Mrs. E. Bishop, and Michel H. Salaman, who were mutual friends of the Clarke Halls, to enable Edna to retain her studio and continue working.

In 1939 a retrospective of her drawings was held at Manchester. In 1941, Clarke Hall's London studio was destroyed, along with much of her work, by enemy action during the Blitz.

== Later life and death ==
The loss of her studio was a devastating blow. Clarke Hall gradually painted less and less until ceasing completely in the early 1950s. She lived out the rest of her life with her niece and companion, Mary Fearnley Sander, until her death, aged 100, on 16 November 1979.

Her son, Denis Clarke Hall, was President of the Architectural Association in 1958–59.
