= Robert Bruford =

British Member of Parliament (1868-1939)

Robert Bruford (28 June 1868 – 29 December 1939) was a British farmer and agriculturist who developed his activities into the political field. Highly active in his native Somerset where he was a member of many public bodies and served in local government, Bruford was briefly the Conservative Party Member of Parliament for Wells.

== Farming upbringing ==
The son of a farmer and Justice of the Peace also named Robert Bruford, Bruford was educated at Thorn Park School in Teignmouth and Fullands School in Taunton, but went to work on the farm and in the brewery business owned by the family at an early age. He assumed full control of the business in 1896. At the Bath and West of England Agricultural Show in Newport, Monmouthshire in June 1907, his two-year-old bull 'Pound Bellringer' was reckoned the leader in its class, and he won prizes in other years as well. As with many farms in the area, the family held a farm tenancy rather than owning the land themselves. Bruford became a Director of the Taunton Gas Company Ltd, and of the West Somerset Bacon and Dairy Company Ltd.

== Local government service ==
Bruford began his interest in local public service in 1898; he was first elected to Taunton Rural District Council in 1901 and remained a member until his death; from 1906 to 1923 he was Chairman of the council. Bruford was then elected to Taunton Board of Guardians, of which he also became chairman, and in 1907 he secured a seat on Somerset County Council. Later that year he joined the Somerset local committee for debenture-holders in the brewery industry, which were formed to oppose temperance legislation which would harm their financial interests.

== 1922 election ==
He was already very well known when the sitting Conservative MP for Wells, Sir Harry Greer, announced he would not contest the 1922 general election. Bruford was nominated as a Conservative, but was also one of four Conservative candidates to be sponsored by the National Farmers Union. In his election address, Bruford decried "hasty" legislation and said that he wanted "not more legislation, but less legislation". He also called for a return to the freedom and liberty of the subject enjoyed in pre-war years. He was elected with a majority of 3,054 over Liberal candidate Arthur Hobhouse.

== Parliament ==
In Parliament, Bruford concentrated on agricultural issues, making his maiden speech on 7 December 1922 supporting the Importation of Animals Bill which allowed cattle to be brought into Britain from Canada; in his speech Bruford said that he had opposed cattle imports and thought the Bill was not in the interests of agriculture, but that the Government had given a pledge and could not go back on it. He called for more protection against disease in imported cattle. Later that month he called for all breadstuff imports to be in the form of grain rather than flour, to give employment to British millers; his suggestion caught the eye of former Minister of Food Viscount Bledisloe.

== Defeat ==
In May 1923 Bruford led a debate on the redistribution of the burden of Rating, arguing that national or semi-national services provided by local government should not be chargeable to the Rates. His suggestion was supported by individual members of parliament from all parties, and the reply from the Government was sympathetic. When new Prime Minister Stanley Baldwin called a general election at the end of 1923, Bruford was a supporter of the protectionist policy he put forward and thought to be in a good position to persuade his constituency; his re-election was therefore regarded by The Times' correspondent as a "foregone conclusion". However he lost his seat by 909 votes to Hobhouse.

== Later life ==
Out of Parliament Bruford maintained his local public service, and in 1928 became a County Alderman of Somerset. In July 1928 he was elected as vice-chairman of the Mental Hospitals Association, becoming chairman a year later and serving for two years. He regained the Chairmanship of Taunton Rural District Council in 1934. At a meeting of the Smithfield Club of cattle breeders in December 1935, Bruford said that the fat stock shows gave prizes to animals which were too heavy and not wanted by butchers; he argued that there should be a weight limit and prizes should be awarded to the ideal animal which was 10 or 11 hundredweight. Towards the end of his life he was Chairman of the Council of Agriculture for England in 1937–38.

Parliament of the United Kingdom
Preceded by Sir Harry Greer	Member of Parliament for Wells; 1922 – 1923	Succeeded by Arthur Hobhouse
