= Arthur Hobhouse =

English local government Liberal politician

Sir Arthur Hobhouse
- Hobhouse circa 1922
- Born: Arthur Lawrence Hobhouse; 15 February 1886
- Died: 20 January 1965 (aged 78)
- Education: Eton College
- Alma mater: St Andrews University; Trinity College, Cambridge
- Occupations: solicitor, politician
- Known for: MP, Chairman, National Parks Committee
- Spouse: Konradin Huth Jackson
- Children: 5, including Henry Hobhouse and Hermione Hobhouse
- Parent(s): Henry Hobhouse; Margaret Heyworth Potter
- Relatives: Stephen Henry Hobhouse (brother)

Sir Arthur Lawrence Hobhouse (15 February 1886 – 20 January 1965) was an English Liberal politician who is best remembered as the architect of the system of national parks of England and Wales. He was a Member of Parliament for Wells from 1923 to 1924 and chairman of the Somerset County Council 1940 to 1947.

== Early life ==
Hobhouse was the son of Liberal politician and MP Henry Hobhouse and the brother of peace activist, prison reformer, and religious writer Stephen Henry Hobhouse.

Arthur Hobhouse was educated at Eton College, St Andrews University and Trinity College, Cambridge, where he graduated in Natural Sciences. At Cambridge, he was a Cambridge Apostle and a member of the Cambridge University Liberal Club, becoming Secretary in 1906 and was also the lover of John Maynard Keynes and Duncan Grant.

== Career ==
Hobhouse practised as a solicitor until the outbreak of World War I, when he joined the British Expeditionary Force. After the War he joined the Claims Commission, dealing with claims against Allied forces in the Abbeville area, and rose to the rank of Staff Captain. Returning to civilian life, Hobhouse took to farming on a family estate Hadspen house and garden in Somerset.

== Political career ==
He stood as Liberal candidate for Wells at the 1922 General Election when he finished a strong second. He was elected Member of Parliament for Wells at the 1923 General Election but lost the seat in 1924. He failed to regain Wells in 1929.

=== Electoral record ===
General election 1922: Wells
Party	Candidate	Votes	%	±%
Unionist	Robert Bruford	10,210	47.7	
Liberal	Arthur Lawrence Hobhouse	7,156	33.4	
Labour	Leonard Smith	4,048	18.9	
Majority		3,054	14.2	
Turnout			77.8	
Unionist hold		Swing		

General election 1923: Wells
Party	Candidate	Votes	%	±%
Liberal	Arthur Lawrence Hobhouse	10,818	48.2	+14.8
Unionist	Robert Bruford	9,909	44.2	−3.5
Labour	Charles Henry Whitlow	1,713	7.6	−11.3
Majority		909	4.0	18.3
Turnout			79.1	+1.3
Liberal gain from Unionist		Swing	+9.1	

General election 1924: Wells
Party	Candidate	Votes	%	±%
Unionist	Rt Hon. Robert Arthur Sanders	12,642	52.6	+8.4
Liberal	Arthur Lawrence Hobhouse	8,668	36.1	−12.1
Labour	Wilfred Thomas Young	2,726	11.3	+3.7
Majority			16.5	20.5
Turnout			82.2	+3.1
Unionist gain from Liberal		Swing	+10.2	

General election 1929: Wells
Party	Candidate	Votes	%	±%
Unionist	Anthony John Muirhead	13,026	43.6	−9.0
Liberal	Arthur Lawrence Hobhouse	12,382	41.4	+5.3
Labour	Mrs R D Q Davies	4,472	15.0	+3.7
Majority		644	2.2	−14.3
Turnout			82.5	+0.3
Unionist hold		Swing	-7.2	

=== Local government ===
He was elected to Somerset County Council in 1925, became an alderman in 1934, and was chairman of the council from 1940 to 1947.

In 1945 he was appointed by Lewis Silkin, the Minister of Town and Country Planning, to chair the National Parks Committee. The resulting Hobhouse Report was the basis for the National Parks and Access to the Countryside Act 1949. Of the twelve parks it proposed, ten were implemented in the 1950s, while the remaining two, the New Forest and the South Downs, were proposed in 1999 and finally designated in 2005 and 2009, respectively.

Hobhouse was knighted in 1942. Sir Arthur also served as Chairman of the Rural Housing Committee 1942–1947, was pro-chancellor of Bristol University and was both Chairman and President of the County Councils Association (now part of the Local Government Association). For many years he was President of the Open Spaces Society, till his resignation in 1955.

== Personal life ==
In his youth, Hobhouse's affairs were exclusively homosexual. He had long-standing affairs with the Bloomsbury Group members Lytton Strachey, Duncan Grant, and John Maynard Keynes. Hobhouse was considered extremely desirable in Edwardian gay circles and was the subject of much infighting amongst the men of Bloomsbury.

Hobhouse married Konradin Huth Jackson, daughter of Frederick and Annabel Huth Jackson; they had five children:

- Elizabeth Hobhouse (1921–1995)
- Henry Hobhouse (1924–2016)
- Paul Rodbard Hobhouse (1927–1994)
- Mary Hermione Hobhouse (1934–2014)
- Anne Virginia Hobhouse (1936–2023)

Hobhouse's eldest daughter married first Michael Francis Eden later Lord Henley, and secondly Michael King, son of Cecil Harmsworth King. Hobhouse's eldest son, Henry, wrote Seeds of Change: Five Plants That Transformed Mankind. Henry was married three times, and had a daughter, Janet, who died in 1991. A younger son, Paul, married Penelope Chichester-Clark.

== Sources ==
- Obituary: 'Sir Arthur Hobhouse: A long record of public service', The Times, 21 January 1965

== See also ==
- List of Bloomsbury Group people

Parliament of the United Kingdom
Preceded by Robert Bruford	Member of Parliament for Wells; 1923 – 1924	Succeeded by Robert Arthur Sanders
