= Tylers Common =

Common land in London, England

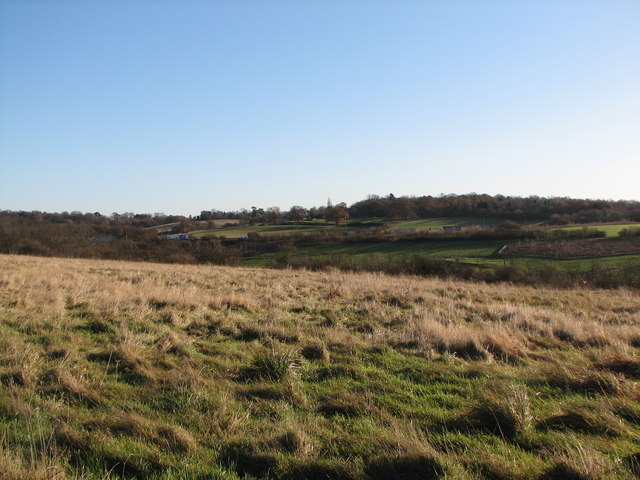
- Tylers Common
- Interactive map of Tylers Common
- Type: Common land
- Coordinates: 51.592°N 0.259°E
- Area: 79.2 acres (0.321 km^{2})
- Operator: Havering London Borough Council
- Open: All year

Tylers Common, also known as Upminster Common, is common land in the London Borough of Havering. It is one of the largest areas of common land in Greater London, with 32.06 hectares (79.2 acres) of protected commons.
