= Mary Hobhouse =

Irish poet and novelist

- Born: Mary Violet McNeill; 8 June 1864; London, England
- Died: 24 August 1901 (aged 37); London, England

Mary or Violet Hobhouse (8 June 1864 – 24 August 1901) was an Irish poet and novelist.

== Life ==
Mary Hobhouse was born Mary Violet McNeill on 8 June 1864 in London. She was the second daughter of land agent and deputy lord lieutenant of County Antrim, Edmund McNeill and his wife Mary (née Miller). She was one of ten children, with only three surviving to adulthood. The family moved from her mother's home of Ballycastle, County Antrim in 1866 to a newly built mansion, Craigdunn near Ballymena. She started writing as a young woman, reading widely on Irish tradition, language and folklore, producing her own patriotic lyrics and translations from Irish. Hobhouse was an ardent unionist, and spoke in England against Irish home rule during the 1887 and 1888 elections.

She married Walter Hobhouse (1862–1928) in July 1887. He was a student at Christ Church, Oxford who went on to be ordained and along with other appointments, was a headmaster of Durham School, archdeacon of Aston, and the canon residentiary of Gloucester. The couple had two sons and a daughter. After her marriage, Hobhouse continued to write, including two novels: An unknown quantity in 1898 and Warp and weft in 1899. Hobhouse and her family lived in England for many years, she regularly visited the family home in Antrim. She died at her home, 82 Onslow Gardens, London on 24 August 1901 having contracted tuberculosis. Her husband prepared a volume of her devotional poetry, Speculum animae, which was circulated amongst her friends.
