= Standish Hospital =

- Gloucestershire Hospitals NHS Foundation Trust
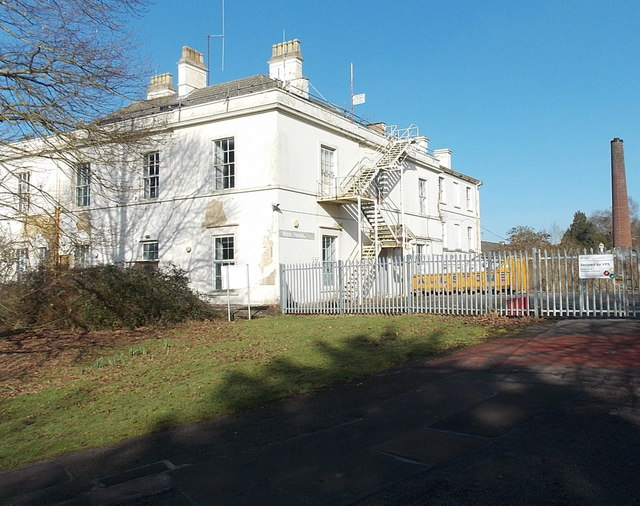
- Main House and chimney stack, Standish Hospital

- Shown in Gloucestershire

Geography
- Location: Standish, Gloucestershire, England, United Kingdom
- Coordinates: 51.7594°N 2.2663°W

Organisation
- Care system: Public NHS
- Type: Community

Services
- Emergency department: No Accident & Emergency

History
- Founded: 1920
- Closed: 2004

Links
- Lists: Hospitals in England

Standish Hospital was a specialist orthopaedics, rheumatology and respiratory care National Health Service (NHS) hospital, located in the hamlet of Standish, Gloucestershire, England. The building was originally a private country house. After it closed as a hospital in 2004, proposals were brought forward for redevelopment of the site.

== History ==
=== Private house ===
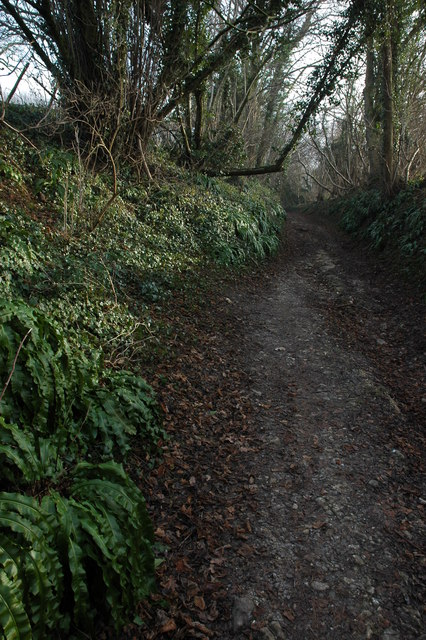
Right of way through Standish Woods, located above Standish Park and Standish House

Below Standish Wood, which together with Haresfield Beacon was acquired by the National Trust in 1931, lies Standish Park, which has existed since the 16th century. Originally part of Standish Court, the Park covered 250 acres (100 ha), and was part of the estate of the Baron's Sherborne of Gloucestershire. Developing the Park as a country retreat, Standish House was constructed on the property.

In 1853, James Dutton, 3rd Baron Sherborne leased it to Gloucester-based businessman Richard Potter, son of Radical MP Richard Potter, then a director of timber merchants Price & Co., later the managing director of the Great Western Railway. Potter lived at the house with his wife Lawrencina, daughter of a Liverpool-based merchant, and their nine daughters. Three were born in the property, including later sociologist, economist, socialist and social reformer Martha Beatrice Webb, Lady Passfield.

Potter developed the gardens along with managed Victorian era principles, building extensive heated greenhouses to allow the family to eat well. It eventually provided a ready supply of grapes, plus a dedicated mushroom house and watercress beds. A drilled spring provided a steady year-round stream, which was landscaped to provide a pond by the construction of a brick wall dam. Beneath the dam there was an ice store, allowing year-round supplies of ice.

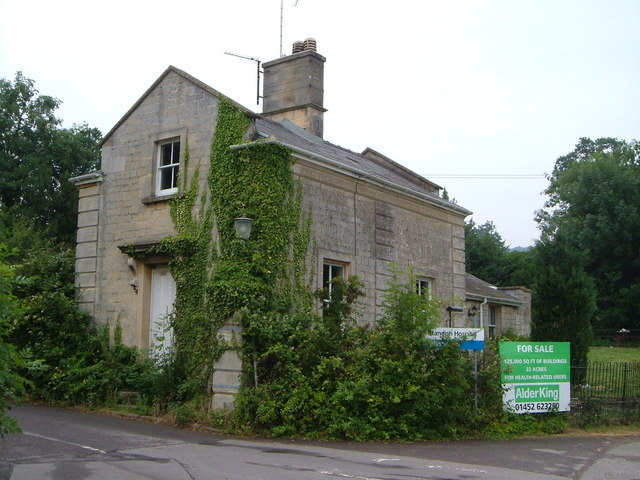
Standish Lodge, which marks the entrance of Standish Park and Standish House

In 1882, Lawrencina died and the remaining family members moved out, with Richard moving to Box House in Minchinhampton, where he died on 1 January 1892.

On 24 June 1884, Mrs. Annie Poole King of Kensington House, Brislington, Somerset leased Standish House on a contract term of 21 years from Edward Dutton, 4th Baron Sherborne, at a rate of £150pa. The widow of a shipping magnate, she moved in with five children, plus a house staff of a coachman, cook, housekeeper, and gardener. A member of the Berkeley Hunt, at the time the house had a stable block capable of housing 30+ horses.

The outbreak of the Boer War reduced global shipping rates, and particularly the rand, which greatly affected Mrs. King's income. In 1897 the family left the house, and downsized with their entire staff to Newark Park at Ozleworth, Wotton-under-Edge.

=== Hospital ===
In 1914 the house was unoccupied and Lord Sherborne, after having been approached by Mary King, not only lent it for use as a Red Cross Hospital but also agreed to have the whole inside painted. It was fitted with electric light and the baths and sanitary accommodation was improved. Standish House Hospital opened as a British Red Cross hospital under the management of Mary King on 13 May 1915. There were 100 beds within the house and 8 fully trained nursing sisters. The rest of the staff was all local volunteers. Patients were wounded soldiers from all over the country. A total of 2,292 sick and wounded soldiers were treated at the hospital during the First World War.

After the war living conditions were very poor which led to a rise in diseases such as tuberculosis. The Government and Local Authorities had a duty to try to improve people's health and so it was proposed that Standish should be opened as a Tuberculosis Institution. Gloucestershire County Council bought Standish Park in its entirety from Lord Sherborne. The house was turned into a sanatorium to treat tuberculosis in 1922.

Funds were raised for suitable equipment and refurbishing, the Red Cross contributing £10,000. Standish House Sanatorium was opened on 6 July 1922. It had a total of 140 beds divided into men's, women's and children's blocks. The wards were run to a strict timetable but there were also plenty of recreation activities including a jazz band, cinema, games, and concerts. Over the next 15 years, the accommodation was expanded and in 1939 a new men's block was opened. During the Second World War expansion slowed but, despite this, in 1947, "C" block, with 65 female beds, 19 children's beds and a modern Physiotherapy Department was opened.

In 1948 the hospital became part of the National Health Service and a new X-Ray Department was opened. As tuberculosis became less common the range of conditions treated at the hospital grew. It specialized in orthopaedics, rheumatology and respiratory care across the whole of Gloucestershire. In this role, it undertook joint replacements, as well as caring for coal miners from the Forest of Dean with the most serious of respiratory problems. In 1953 the name was changed to Standish House Chest Hospital.

In 1956 the League of Friends for Standish Hospital was formed which organized fundraising and additional amenities for patients and visitors. The hospital continued to develop its service including Physiotherapy and Occupational Therapy.

In 1974 the NHS had a major reorganization. Standish came under the Gloucestershire Area Health Authority. A new theatre was opened and the X-Ray Dept modernized. During the 1980s more management changes were made and services began to be transferred to Gloucestershire Royal Hospital. Despite new facilities having been built, and protests made by local groups such as "Save Our Standish", in 1992 formal proposals were made to close the hospital.

Gloucestershire Hospitals NHS Trust considered reducing the number of beds at the hospital, as part of a series of cost-cutting proposals, in October 2003. Although the Minister for Health, John Hutton, considered several options for the future of the hospital in March 2004, closure was ultimately confirmed and the last patients were ultimately moved to Gloucestershire Royal Hospital in December 2004.

=== Redevelopment ===
In 2006 Standish Mutual Care Trust proposed turning the residual 31 acres (13 ha) site into a centre for health and well-being, but were out-bid by a private healthcare concern. Then in 2010 Gloucestershire County Council proposed a mixed-use redevelopment of the site involving a health and social care centre. The proposed "health campus" would offer supported living options and access to care for the elderly and people with physical and learning disabilities. However, in 2017 PJ Livesey Group, a private developer, proposed redeveloping the site for residential use.

== Sources ==
- Atkinson, Gillian (2004). A photographic history of Standish House and its occupants.
- An audio description of how one WW1 VAD nurse commuted to Standish VAD hospital, narrated by her grandson
