= Seeds of Change (non-fiction book) =

1985 book by Henry Hobhouse

- Author: Henry Hobhouse
- Language: English
- Subject: Human history, Plants
- Publisher: Sidgwick & Jackson (1st edition), Papermac (2nd edition)
- Publication date: 1985 (1st edition), 1999 (2nd edition)
- Publication place: United Kingdom
- Media type: Paperback
- Pages: 381 pages (2nd edition, paperback)
- ISBN: 0-333-73628-1 (2nd edition, paperback)
- OCLC: 40753070

Seeds of Change: Five Plants That Transformed Mankind is a 1985 book by Henry Hobhouse which explains how the history of the world since Columbus linked America to Europe has been changed by five plants. It describes how humankind's discovery, usage and trade of sugar, tea, cotton, the potato, and quinine have influenced history to make the modern world.

In the second edition of the book, Seeds of Change: Six Plants that Transformed Mankind, he adds the coca plant to the list. In 2004, he published a follow-up book Seeds of Wealth: Four Plants That Made Men Rich covering timber, wine, rubber, and tobacco.

== Reception ==
David E. Allen writing in Medical History described it as "a thoughtful, thought-provoking, extremely readable work" It has been recommended reading and studied at universities and has been reviewed by the Library Journal, The American Historical Review, and The Atlantic.
