= Stephen Hobhouse =

English peace activist, prison reformer and religious writer

Stephen Henry Hobhouse
- Born: 5 August 1881; Pitcombe, Somerset, England
- Died: 2 April 1961 (aged 79)
- Education: Balliol College, Oxford
- Occupation: Religious writer
- Known for: Prison reform Peace activism
- Notable work: English prisons to-day: Being the report of the Prison system enquiry committee
- Spouse: Rosa Waugh Hobhouse
- Parent(s): Henry Hobhouse; Margaret Heyworth Potter
- Relatives: Arthur Lawrence Hobhouse (brother)

Stephen Henry Hobhouse (5 August 1881 – 2 April 1961) was an English peace activist, prison reformer, and religious writer.

== Family ==
Stephen Henry Hobhouse was born in Pitcombe, Somerset, England. He was the eldest son of Henry Hobhouse, a wealthy landowner and Liberal Party MP from 1885 to 1906, and Margaret Heyworth Potter. Both sides of his family included a number of reformers and progressive politicians:

- As an MP, his father was behind the Education Act 1902.
- His paternal cousin Emily Hobhouse (1860–1926) was known for bringing attention to British concentration camps in South Africa during the Second Boer War. Her views greatly influenced Stephen.
- His paternal cousin Leonard Trelawny Hobhouse (1864–1929) was a sociologist and one of the founders of social liberalism.
- His brother Arthur Hobhouse (1886–1965) was the architect of the system of National parks of England and Wales.
- His maternal aunt Catherine Courtney, Baroness Courtney of Penwith (1847–1929), was a social worker and internationalist.
- His maternal aunt Beatrice Webb (1858–1943), was a sociologist, economist, and social reformer who played key roles in founding both the London School of Economics and Political Science and the Fabian Society.
- His maternal grandfather Richard Potter (1817–1892) was a chairman of the Great Western Railway.
- His maternal great-grandfather Richard Potter (1778–1842) was a radical Liberal Party MP.

Richard Potter	Lawrencina Potter
Catherine Courtney	Leonard Courtney	Theresa Cripps	Charles Cripps	Marian Cripps	Margaret Hobhouse	Henry Hobhouse	Beatrice Webb	Sidney Webb
Stafford Cripps	Stephen Hobhouse	Arthur Hobhouse

== Education and formative years ==
Stephen Hobhouse was brought up as a member of the Church of England. He was educated at Eton, where he won prizes in both academics and sports, and at Balliol College, Oxford. Hobhouse attended Quaker meetings in Hampstead after graduation and officially became a member of the Society of Friends in 1909.

The Second Boer War broke out when he was 18. He originally supported the war but his views were soon challenged by his cousin Emily. "Thus, no doubt, it was that my mind was prepared for the awakening". What he regarded as an awakening came from a 1902 reading of a pamphlet by Leo Tolstoy. This tract had a profound influence on him and he became an ardent pacifist.

He worked as a civil servant for seven years in the Board of Education. During the Balkan Wars of 1912–1913, he resigned his post to go to Constantinople as a volunteer with a Quaker relief mission that helped refugees and saw firsthand the damage that war can do.

== Marriage ==
In April 1915, Hobhouse married Rosa Waugh. He met her at a dinner party for Christian activists. She was also an activist, and spent three months in jail for distributing pacifist pamphlets. Rosa was a prolific author. Together they wrote a biography of Samuel Hahnemann, the founder of homeopathy. Both Hobhouses were believers in homeopathy, and Steven translated articles for the Homeopathic Journal.

As eldest son of a wealthy family, Stephen stood to inherit a large fortune, but, influenced by Tolstoy again, he renounced his inheritance. He and his wife adopted a lifestyle of poverty, living in Hoxton, then a slum district in East London. At the same time they joined the Quakers and became active in Quaker service.

== Pacifism and prison ==
Hobhouse was conscripted into the army in 1916.

At a tribunal in August 1916, he was granted an exemption from military service so long as he joined the Friends Ambulance Unit. As an absolutist or unconditionalist conscientious objector, however, Hobhouse refused either to accept the decision or to appeal against it. He ignored a notice to report to barracks, was arrested by the civil police, brought before a magistrates' court, and handed over to the military. He refused to put on military uniform, was court-martialled and sentenced to imprisonment with hard labour.

Hobhouse was then placed in solitary confinement because he refused to obey the "Rule of Silence" forbidding prisoners to speak to one another. He wrote to his wife: "The spirit of love requires that I should speak to my fellow-prisoners, the spirit of truth that I should speak to them openly" By mid-1917, after 112 days in jail, followed by a second jail sentence, his health was declining rapidly. His health had always been frail: he had previously suffered nervous breakdowns and scarlet fever. His wife was angry about his treatment in prison and some said that he never recovered his health entirely. In 1917 Hobhouse wrote:

Nearly every feature of prison life seems deliberately arranged to destroy a man's sense of his own personality, his power of choice and initiative, his possessive instincts, his concept of himself as a being designed to love and serve his fellow-man. His very name is blotted out and he becomes a number; A.3.21 and D.2.65 were two of my designations. He and his fellows are elaborately counted, when-ever moved from one location to another, in the characteristic machine-like way. He is continually, of course, under lock and key, ignored except as an object for spying.

His mother, Margaret, was a supporter of the First World War, in which three of her four sons served: the youngest Paul Edward was killed in March 1918. She was determined, however, to save her eldest son Stephen's life and to draw attention to the predicament of 1,350 war resisters then being held in prison.

She maintained that "absolutists" like Stephen should either receive a King's Pardon or be released into civilian life. Margaret produced a pamphlet, I Appeal unto Caesar: the case of the conscientious objectors, with an introduction by the classicist and public figure Gilbert Murray, publicising the plight of the conscientious objectors. The pamphlet sold over 18,000 copies. (Recent research by Jo Vellacott has revealed that the appeal's author was actually Bertrand Russell.) This active public campaign was aided discreetly by the influential Alfred Milner, who was a family friend. The case of Stephen Hobhouse was first raised in Parliament on 9 July 1917. The campaign prevailed and in December 1917 Stephen, and some 300 other COs, was released from prison on grounds of ill health.

In prison Hobhouse met Fenner Brockway, a "fiery socialist" and fellow anti-war activist. After the war, they wrote English Prisons Today, sponsored by the Prison System Enquiry Committee. This book, which appeared in 1922, was a critique of the English prison system, initiating a wave of prison reform which has continued to this day.

== Writings ==
Hobhouse wrote many books on prison reform, Quakerism, and religion. Selected works include:

- 1918 The silence system in British prisons. London: Hoxton. OCLC 83702276.
- 1919 Joseph Sturge, his life and work. London. OCLC 187101825.
- 1919 An English prison from within. London: G. Allen & Unwin. OCLC 60734929.
- 1922 English prisons to-day: being the report of the Prison system enquiry committee. London: Longmans, Green and co. OCLC 4619955.
- 1927 William Law and eighteenth century Quakerism. London. OCLC 466191746.
- 1934 Margaret Hobhouse and her family. Rochester [Eng.]: Stanhope Press. OCLC 7161818.
- 1937 Isaac Newton and Jacob Boehme. Belgrade. OCLC 36931558.
- 1948 Selected Mystical Writing of William Law. New York: Harper. OCLC 8408065.
- 1944? Christ and our enemies. London: Society for Promoting Christian Knowledge. OCLC 8970134.
- 1946 A Christian's outline of belief. London: Fellowship of Reconciliation. OCLC 43490560.
- 1951 Forty years and an epilogue an autobiography (1881–1951). London: J. Clarke. OCLC 612886400.
- 1952 The autobiography of Stephen Hobhouse, reformer, pacifist, Christian. Boston: Beacon Press. OCLC 3463052.
- 1954 A discourse on the life to come. London: Independent Press. OCLC 4392028.
