= Standish, Gloucestershire =

Village in Gloucestershire, England

Coordinates: 51.774°N 2.291°W

Standish
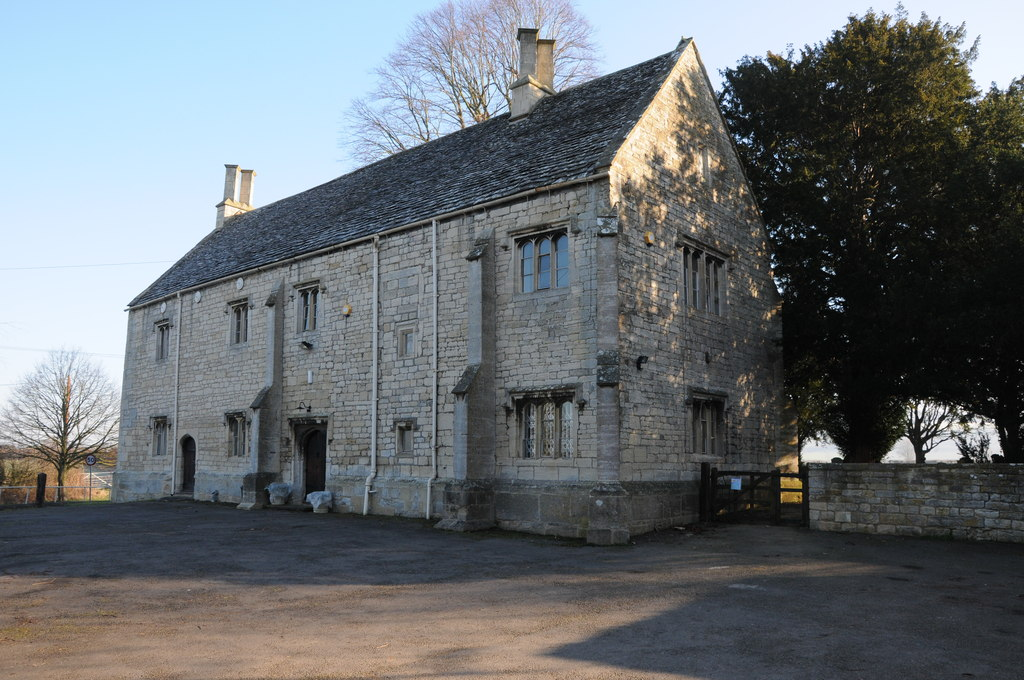
- Standish Village Hall

- Location within Gloucestershire
- Population: 227 (2011 Census)
- District: Stroud
- Shire county: Gloucestershire
- Region: South West
- Country: England
- Sovereign state: United Kingdom
- Post town: Stonehouse
- Postcode district: GL10
- Police: Gloucestershire
- Fire: Gloucestershire
- Ambulance: South Western
- UK Parliament: Stroud

Standish is a small village and civil parish in the Stroud local government district in Gloucestershire, England.

The village is 5 kilometres (3.1 mi) north-west of Stroud, on the B4008 road to Quedgeley. The parish, which in the 2001 census had a population of 285, also contains the hamlet of Stroud Green, situated south-east of Standish village. The population had reduced to 227 at the 2011 census.

Originally part of the estate of the Barons Sherborne of Gloucestershire, they developed Standish Court as part of their holdings. Abandoned in the 16th century, they then developed Standish House as a country retreat. Having sold Standish Wood to the National Trust, they sold Standish House to Gloucestershire County Council post-World War I, on which they developed Standish Hospital, which was immediately passed to the British Red Cross for treatment of soldiers. In the 1920s it became a sanatorium for tuberculosis patients, and a US Army medical facility during World War II. Developed by the National Health Service (NHS) as a specialist hospital, it closed in 2004.

The parish church is the Grade I listed Church of St Nicholas, built in the 14th century and restored in the 1860s by J P St Aubyn.

Between Standish and Stroud Green is Standish Junction, a railway junction where the Golden Valley Line joins the Bristol to Birmingham Cross Country Route.

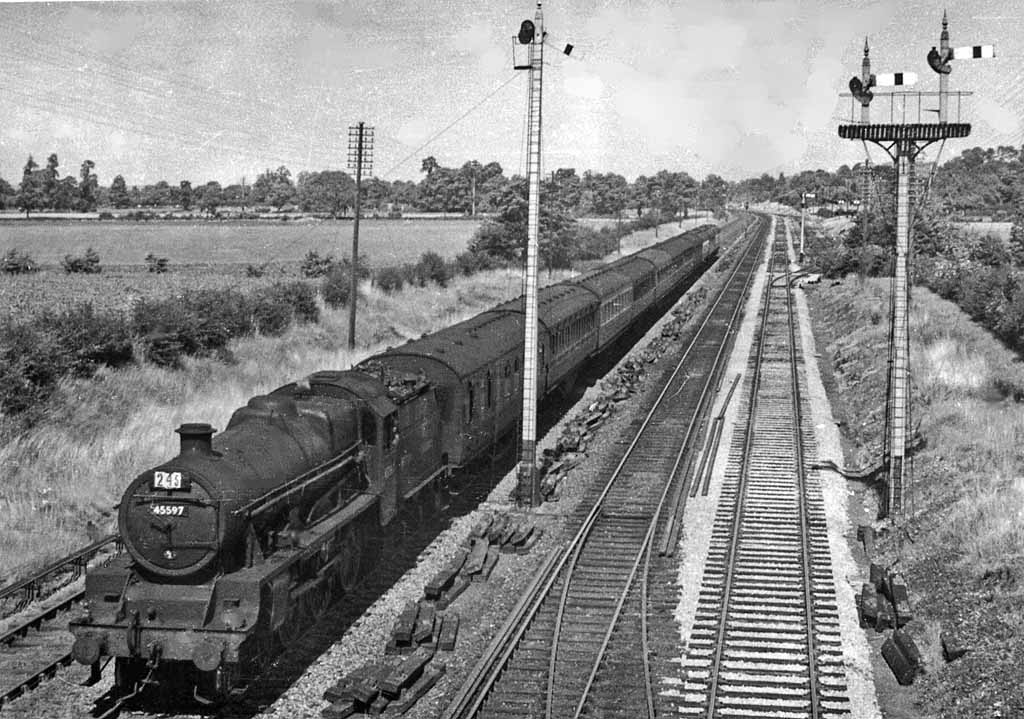
Bradford to Bournemouth West express at Standish Junction in 1951

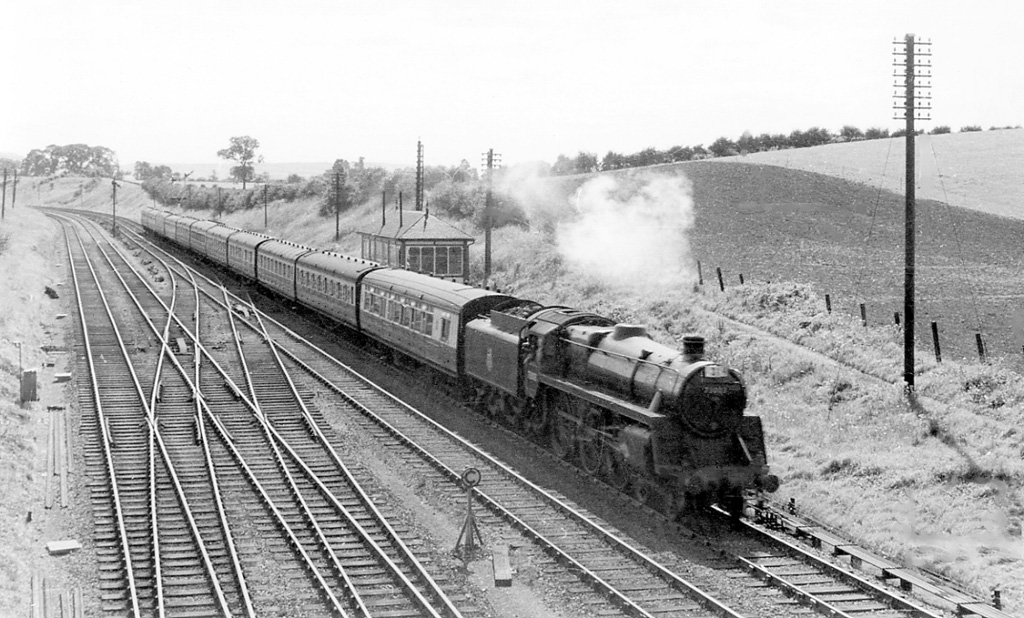
Bournemouth West to Derby express at Standish Junction in 1951
