= Janet Hobhouse =

American novelist

- Born: March 27, 1948; New York City, US
- Died: February 1, 1991 (aged 42); New York City, US
- Relatives: Henry Hobhouse (father)
- Writing career
- Notable works: Everybody Who Was Anybody, The Furies

Janet Hobhouse (March 27, 1948 – February 1, 1991) was an American novelist, biographer and editor. She is the author of four novels, including the posthumously published The Furies. Her first published work was a biography of Gertrude Stein, Everybody Who was Anybody. She was a contributing editor to ARTnews and also published a monograph on artists' representation of the female nude in the twentieth century. Born in New York City to Henry Hobhouse and Frances Liedloff, she attended the Spence School and Oxford University. Hobhouse was married to journalist and film maker Nick Fraser from January 18, 1974, until their divorce in 1983.

== The Furies ==
Hobhouse died in 1991 at the age of 42 from cancer. Her celebrated novel The Furies was published two years later. In the New York Times, Michiko Kakutani called the novel a “beautiful—and profoundly affecting—meditation on love and death and family.” In the Los Angeles Times, writer and critic Daphne Merkin described the reading experience as “extraordinary ... a stunning heartbreaker of a book, shot through with pellucid sadness.”

In 2004, The Furies was reissued by New York Review of Books Classics, with an introduction by Merkin.

== Works ==
- Everybody Who Was Anybody, 1976, a biography of Gertrude Stein
- Nellie Without Hugo, 1982, novel
- Dancing in the Dark, 1983, novel
- November, 1986, novel
- The Bride Stripped Bare: The Artist and the Female Nude in the Twentieth Century, 1988, non-fiction
- The Furies, 1992, novel
