= Henry Hobhouse (East Somerset MP) =

British politician

Hobhouse in 1895.

Henry Hobhouse PC (1 March 1854 – 25 June 1937) was an English landowner and Liberal, and from 1886 Liberal Unionist politician who sat in the House of Commons from 1885 to 1906.

Hobhouse was the son of Henry Hobhouse, of Hadspen House, Somerset, and his wife, the Hon. Charlotte Etruria Talbot, daughter of James Talbot, 3rd Baron Talbot of Malahide. After his father's death in 1862 his uncle Arthur Hobhouse became his guardian. He was educated at Eton and Balliol College, Oxford, and was called to the Bar at Lincoln's Inn. He practised as a parliamentary draughtsman and was a J.P. for Somerset.

In the 1885 general election, Hobhouse was elected MP for East Somerset. He held the seat until 1906. Hobhouse was particularly concerned with education. He was appointed to the Board of Education in 1900 and was behind the establishment of the Education Act 1902.

Hobhouse was involved in the founding of Sexey's School and Sunny Hill (now Bruton School for Girls) at Bruton. He was also pro-chancellor of Bristol University and an honorary LLD of the university,. He worked hard on behalf of the university and left a collection of books to the library.

Hobhouse was a county figure and knowledgeable about local matters. A member of Somerset County Council, he was responsible for forming the County Councils Association. He was also behind the establishment of the Cider Institute in 1902 and was its chairman.

== Marriage ==
He married Margaret Heyworth Potter (daughter of Richard Potter). Their children included: Stephen Henry Hobhouse, an important British peace activist and prison reformer; Arthur Lawrence Hobhouse built the system of National parks in England and Wales, and John Richard, a ship owner who was the father of the law lord John Hobhouse, Baron Hobhouse of Woodborough; and Rachel (1883–1981) married Sir George Felix Neville Clay, 5th Baronet, and had a son Sir Henry Felix Clay, 6th Baronet. Their youngest son (Paul Edward Hobhouse) died on 21 March 1918 in the First World War (he is commemorated on the Pozières Memorial); another daughter died in infancy. Margaret died in 1921, and, in 1923, Hobhouse married Anne Mackessack.

== Death ==
Hobhouse lived at Hadspen House, Castle Cary, Somerset, and died at the age of 83.

Parliament of the United Kingdom
New constituency	Member of Parliament for East Somerset; 1885 – 1906	Succeeded by John Thompson
