= Thomas Standfield =

English trade unionist)

Thomas Standfield (11 November 1789 – 19 February 1864) was an English agricultural worker, Methodist and union organiser.

== Early life ==
Thomas Standfield was born in Tolpuddle, Dorset, England to Robert and Elizabeth (née Baker) Standfield.

== Trade unionism ==
George Loveless, Standfield, and other workers petitioned their employers for a wage increase to ten shillings per week, which was agreed by their masters and witnessed by the local Anglican priest. However, the employers soon reneged on the deal reducing their wage to 6 shillings per week, which was insufficient for a comfortable life. The workers then joined the nascent Grand National Consolidated Trades Union (GNCTU) and formed a local branch. As laws prohibiting trade unions had been repealed, the employers conspired with the authorities to use an obscure law forbidding secret oaths to arrest and prosecute the men. At a trial in Dorchester on 19 March 1834, Standfield and five other men were sentenced to seven years' transportation. There was a public outcry, and the six men became known as the Tolpuddle Martyrs.

== Sentence, pardon, and later life ==
On 11 April 1834, the martyrs set sail from Plymouth on the Surry, bound in iron chains and headed for Australia. During the 111-day voyage, the convicts endured abominable conditions and were unable to lie down to sleep. On 17 August 1834, Standfield arrived in the Crown Colony of New South Wales to begin his sentence. Standfield was indentured on a farm near to Maitland, New South Wales

In 1836, King William IV was persuaded to issue a pardon to all six men, although it was not until March 1838 that they returned to England.

After returning to England, the martyrs moved to farms in Essex - the Loveless family at Greensted and the Standfield family at High Laver. They were not made welcome and eventually emigrated to Canada. The Standfields moved to London, Ontario in 1846. Thomas died in 1864 and was buried in Siloam Cemetery.
