= Grand National Consolidated Trades Union =

Former trade union of the United Kingdom

- Abbreviation: GNCTU
- Founded: February 1834; London, United Kingdom
- Dissolved: November 1834
- Location: United Kingdom
- Key people: Robert Owen
- Affiliations: Operative Builders' Union

The Grand National Consolidated Trades Union was an early attempt to form a national union confederation in the United Kingdom, initially devised by Robert Owen in February 1834.

== Background ==
There had been several attempts to form national general unions in the 1820s, culminating with the National Association for the Protection of Labour, established in 1830. However, this had soon failed, and by the early 1830s the most influential labour organization was the Operative Builders' Union.

== Creation ==
In 1833, Owen returned from the United States, and declared the need for a guild-based system of co-operative production. He was able to gain the support of the Builders' Union, which called for a Grand National Guild to take over the entire building trade. In February 1834, a conference was held in London which founded the Grand National Consolidated Trades Union.

The new body, unlike other organisations founded by Owen, was open only to trade unionists and, as a result, initially Owen did not join it. Its foundation coincided with a period of industrial unrest, and strikes broke out in Derby, Leeds and Oldham. These were discouraged by the new union, which unsuccessfully tried to persuade workers to adopt co-operative solutions. Six labourers in Tolpuddle, Dorset attempted to found a friendly society and to seek to affiliate with the Grand National. This was discovered, and in 1834 they were convicted of swearing unlawful oaths, and they were sentenced to transportation for seven years. They became known as the Tolpuddle Martyrs and there was a large and successful campaign led by activist William Lovett to reduce their sentence. They were issued with a free pardon in March 1836.

== Dissolvement ==
The organisation was riven by disagreement over the approach to take, given that many strikes had been lost, the Tolpuddle case had discouraged workers from joining unions, and several new unions had collapsed. The initial reaction was to rename itself the British and Foreign Consolidated Association of Industry, Humanity and Knowledge, focus increasingly on common interests of workers and employers, and attempt to regain prestige by appointing Owen as Grand Master. The organisation began to break up in the summer of 1834 and by November, it had ceased to function: Owen called a congress in London which reconstituted it as the Friendly Association of the Unionists of All Classes of All Nations with himself as Grand Master, but it was defunct by the end of 1834. Meanwhile, the Builders' Union broke up into smaller trade-based unions.

Owen persevered, holding a congress on 1 May 1835 to constitute a new Association of All Classes of All Nations, with himself as Preliminary Father. This was essentially a propaganda organisation, with little popular support, which attempted to gain the ear of influential individuals to propose a more rational society. In 1837, it registered as a friendly society, but was initially overshadowed by Owen's similar National Community Friendly Society. In 1838, it was able to expand significantly by sending out "social missionaries", setting up fifty branches, most in Cheshire, Lancashire and Yorkshire. In 1839, the National Community and the Association of All Classes merged to form the Universal Community Society of Rational Religionists.

Despite its name, the Grand National was never able to gain significant support outside London and, as a result, Lovett's London Working Men's Association was its most important successor. The next attempt to form a national union confederation was the National Association of United Trades for the Protection of Labour.
