= John Gast (activist) =

English shipwright & activist (1772–1837)

John Gast (1772–1837) was an English shipwright and labour activist, an early trade unionist.

== Life ==
He worked in the Deptford shipyards in south-east London; he was also associated with neighbouring Rotherhithe, where he lived for a time at 14 Lucas Street.

Having unsuccessfully tried to found a labour organisation during the 1790s, Gast helped organise the 'Hearts of Oak Benefit Society' during a shipwrights' strike in 1802 and was advocating workers' rights in radical pamphlets such as Calumny Defeated; or, A Compleat Vindication of the Conduct of the Working Shipwrights, during the late Disputes with their Employers (1802).

Having been involved with regional efforts to build trade unions (notably the Metropolitan Trades Committee), in 1822 Gast formed a 'Committee of the Useful Classes', sometimes described as an early national trades council, and in 1824 he was the first secretary of the 'Thames Shipwrights Provident Union'. Gast also promoted an inter-union organisation: 'The Philanthropic Hercules'.

In 1825, the Combination Acts were repealed. Employers were furious and lobbied for the Acts’ restoration, prompting the emergence of workers' movements to resist such steps; Gast founded a pioneering Trades Newspaper as part of this resistance, with Joseph Clinton Robertson.

In 1836, Gast was a member of the London Working Men's Association, some of whose members drafted the core six points of the People's Charter (the principles at the heart of the Chartist movement).

He was also a dissenting preacher and ran the King of Prussia public house at 6 Union Street (now Albury Street), Deptford.

E. P. Thompson suggested, in The Making of the English Working Class, that in the history of working-class movements between 1780 and 1832, he was one of three, with John Doherty and Gravener Henson, who had been outstanding leaders.
