= George Loveless =

George Loveless may refer to:

- George Loveless (preacher) (1797–1874), Methodist preacher, one of the Tolpuddle Martyrs
- George Loveless (rowing) (1909–1968), American rower
