= R v Lovelass =

R v Lovelass and Others
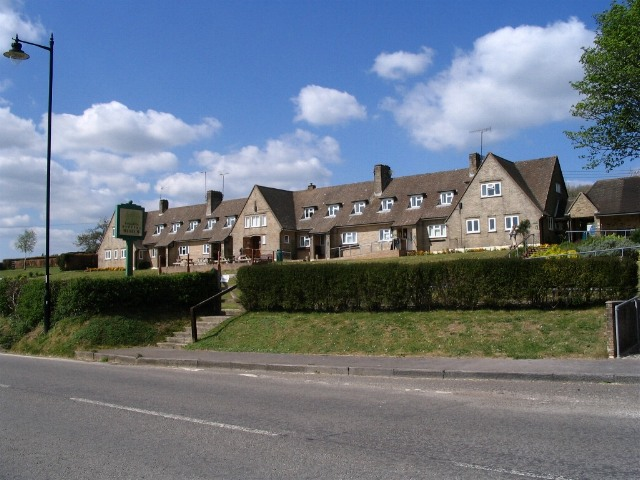
- Tolpuddle Martyrs' museum and cottages
- Court: Dorchester Assizes
- Citations: (1834) 6 Carrington and Payne 596, 172 ER 1380; R v Loveless and Five Others (1834) 1 Moody and Robinson 349, 174 ER 119

Keywords
- Trade unions, friendly societies, oaths, freedom of association, suppression, combination, conspiracy

R v Lovelass and Others (1834) 172 ER 1380 is a formative case in the history of UK labour law. It saw the Tolpuddle Martyrs, farm workers who wished to form a union to prevent wage cuts, convicted and deported to Australia. It triggered protests, which led to the workers' eventual release and return to Britain.

== Facts ==
In Tolpuddle, a village in Dorset, George Lovelass (also spelled "Loveless" in a different report of the trial, and sometimes "Lovelace") and James Lovelass, James Brine, James Hammett, and John Standfield, had met in Thomas Standfield’s house, and had taken an oath to combine to attempt to raise wages for agricultural workers. They formed the Friendly Society of Agricultural Labourers. A witness, Edward Legg, had also taken the oath which included an undertaking to reveal nothing. Under the Unlawful Oaths Act 1797, passed in response to naval mutinies following the French Revolution, it was illegal to make an oath, and a further offence to not reveal the oath.

Lock (also spelled as Lark in the case report) gave evidence as a witness. Edward Legg as a witness said the following.

I went with the last witness; they told us something about striking, or that they meant to strike, and that we might do the same if we liked. There was nothing said about the time when we should strike. There was something said about our masters having notice of it, but I don't remember anything about it. We kissed a book when we were blinded. When we were on our knees, we repeated something that was said by somebody, but who said it I don't know. I believe it was like the voice of James Lovelass. I think the words which we repeated were something about being plunged into eternity, and about keeping secret what was done by the society. I don't know what book it was that I kissed. When I was unblinded I saw a book on the [598] table that resembled a Testament. They shewed us the picture of death, and one of them said, ‘Remember your end!’

Counsel for the defence argued that the purpose of the 1797 Act was to target mutiny and sedition, to break allegiance to the King. Associations to raise wages should no longer be illegal. The lodges of Freemasons were no different. Therefore, the Tolpuddle labourers had done nothing unlawful.

== Judgment ==
Williams B gave the following directions to the jury, that the 1797 Act was essentially applicable to the labourers attempt to combine.

If you are satisfied that an oath, or obligation tantamount to an oath, was administered to either of the witnesses Legg or Lock by means of the prisoners, you ought to find them guilty. The prisoners are indicted under the stat. 37 Geo. III. c. 123, (Note: Unlawful Oaths Act 1797 (37 Geo. 3. c. 123)) the preamble of which refers to seditious and mutinous societies; but I am of opinion that the enacting part of the statute extends to all societies of an illegal nature: and the second section of the stat. 39 Geo. III. c. 79, (Note: Unlawful Societies Act 1799 (39 Geo. 3. c. 79)) enacts that all societies shall be illegal, the members whereof shall, according to the rules thereof, be required to take an oath or engagement not required by law. If you are satisfied from the evidence respecting the blinding, the kneeling, and the other facts proved, that an oath or obligation was imposed on the witnesses, or either of them, you ought to find the prisoners guilty; and if you come to that conclusion, I wish you to state whether you are of opinion that the prisoners were united in a society.

The jury returned a verdict of guilty, that oaths were taken, and further oaths taken not to disclose the oaths. The prisoners were then to be deported to Australia.

== Significance ==
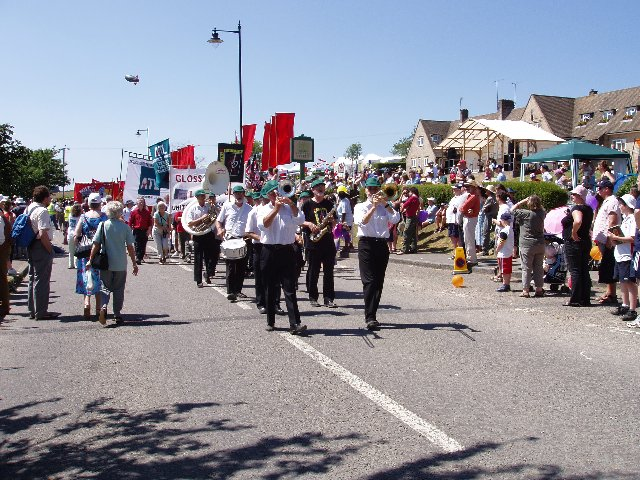
Tolpuddle Martyrs' Rally in 2005

The case triggered a swell of protest. 800,000 signatures were collected for the Tolpuddle labourers, soon to be known as the Tolpuddle Martyrs, to be released. Eventually, in 1837, the Home Secretary did release them and returned them to Britain.

A Tolpuddle Martyrs' Festival and Rally is held annually in Tolpuddle, usually in the third week of July, organised by the Trades Union Congress.

== See also ==
- UK labour law
- Commonwealth v. Hunt, 45 Mass. 111 (1842)

== Bibliography ==
- S Webb and B Webb, The History of Trade Unionism (1920) ch 3
- McGaughey, E. (2018). "1". A Casebook on Labour Law. Hart.
