= OBU =

Obu or OBU may refer to:

== Japan-related topics ==
- Obu Toramasa (1504–1565), Japanese samurai
- Ōbu, a city in the Aichi prefecture
  - Ōbu Station, a railway station in the city of Ōbu

== Educational institutions ==
- Oxford Brookes University, Oxford, England
- United States:
  - Oklahoma Baptist University
  - Ouachita Baptist University

== Finance ==
- Offshore banking, also known as Offshore Banking Unit

== Trade unionism ==
- One Big Union (Canada)
- One Big Union (concept)
- Operative Builders' Union, early British union federation

== Other uses ==
- obu, ISO 639-3 code for Obulom language of Nigeria
- On-Board Unit for implementing Italian toll-highway Telepass
- Open Bitstream Unit in the AOMedia Video 1 (AV1)
