= Gravener Henson =

John Gravener Henson (1785 – 15 November 1852) was a workers' leader from Nottingham, England, and a historian of the framework knitters. E. P. Thompson saw him as one of three outstanding figures in the early English working-class movement.

== Early life ==
Henson was born in Nottingham in 1785, the son of James Henson and Mary, née Gravener. The only hint of his religious sympathies occurs in a brief acknowledgement to the Wesleyan sect in his writings, which might indicate that he was educated at one of the town's Wesleyan Sunday schools.

He was first noticed on 8 October 1808, in the Nottingham Quarter Sessions Records, when as John Gravenor [sic] Henson, he was the subject of a bastardy order for a female child born to Elizabeth Bradwell.

Henson married Martha Farnsworth at St Mary's Church, Nottingham, on 23 December 1813. They are not known to have had any children and she predeceased him in 1850. A contemporary described him as "thick set with a short neck, keen small eyes, and a head very broad at the base, rising angularly to an unusual height".

== Workers' leader ==
Henson was first apprenticed to the stocking frame, and in about 1802 or 1803 became a journeyman and moved into the lace branch of the trade, the only branch of silk and cotton hosiery to prosper during the war years. An 1809 dispute over an agreed standard of measurement as a basis for payment in the lace branch caused the workmen to approach Henson, presumably seeing him as an articulate spokesman. Later he told a Parliamentary Committee, "They compelled me to act, in a good-natured way... they stopped my machine." Led by Henson, the men struck in 1810, but due to weakening exports, the strike collapsed, and he probably spent some time in prison in 1810 as a result of the part he had played.

Rising fear of revolutionary movements was creating conditions unfavourable to understanding between the burgeoning urban working class and employers, on whom a growing number depended for their employment. In 1811 Henson tried unsuccessfully to prosecute four hosiery employers under the Combination Acts, which were intended to cover employers as well as workers, and in 1812, as "Deputy" of The United Committee of Framework Knitters, he made the first of several attempts to obtain parliamentary regulation of the hosiery and lace trades and the organization and cooperation of their workers throughout the country. Because of (or in spite of) these activities, he began to be suspected of being connected in some way with the Luddites or even being Ned Ludd himself. As a result, when the writ of habeas corpus was suspended in England in 1817, he was arrested on a warrant signed by the Home Secretary Lord Sidmouth and imprisoned in April for seven months in Coldbath Fields house of correction. The London Courier noted, "This man Henson has long been an object of dread to the well-disposed inhabitants of Nottingham and its neighbourhood, both on account of the leading influence he was thought to have with the Luddites, and his supposed political principles." Even Francis Place, "the radical tailor of Charing Cross", accepted the popular view that Henson was in fact "King Ludd". This confinement in jail, however, gave Henson an alibi for the Pentrich rising on 9 June 1817 and for the weeks preceding the uprising, and he was released in November of that year.

Henson later maintained he had urged the Luddites to form "clubs and combinations" as "an alternative means of securing their ends", and he claimed that his own life had been threatened repeatedly by some of the more desperate Luddites "for counteracting their designs, and for the freedom of language I have used at various times against their practices." Henson later pulled the leg of Francis Place by suggesting to him that Luddism was a put-up job by the government of the day, to give it an excuse for grinding the people under the heel of military despotism. Francis Place solemnly recorded this conspiracy theory as a piece of serious comment.

E. P. Thompson thought that because Gravener Henson was involved in all the workers' activities of the time, he was most likely involved with Luddism, and that the roles of machine-breaker and Parliamentary petitioner were not incompatible. R. A. Church and S. D. Chapman, however, felt that the two roles could not have coexisted, and that Henson stood for the more sophisticated approach of the urban radicals, contrasting it with the cruder behaviour of their rural cousins, and that Nottingham, unlike the countryside around it, was a political environment in which he could identify with the radical leadership of the town, and so had no need to resort to machine-breaking.

In 1823 Henson embarked on a campaign to secure parliamentary regulation of the hosiery and lace trades. Together with George White, a Clerk of Committees of the House of Commons, a bill was introduced by Peter Moore, M. P. for Coventry, which Henson hoped would repeal the Combination Acts, and replace them with a virtual charter of workers' rights. This far-sighted scheme had little chance of success, but Henson was able at least to present evidence to the Committee on Artisans and Machinery, which may well have helped to secure their repeal in 1824.

In 1833, lace-machine holders, owners and manufacturers joined together to support Henson (and William Felkin) in an attempt to prohibit the export of lace-making machinery. A committee was formed to prevent the smuggling of machines from England to France. (English producers were particularly anxious about French rivals.) Although the Board of Trade had always refused to grant licences for the export of lace machinery, the government had failed to prosecute breaches of the law. On Henson's authority, the committee took possession of machinery which was being dispatched abroad by a London merchant, who promptly instituted action against Henson for illegal seizure. The funds of the committee were soon exhausted by the ensuing court case, and the campaign to prevent exports of machinery was quickly abandoned.

It was a failure for Henson, against what he saw as the cruel system of free trade, and which he believed would work to the disadvantage of Britain's workers, if competitors were able to secure access to British technology.

In later life Henson seems to have distrusted the Chartists, having a poor opinion of their motives and abilities. He thought in 1842 that they were "disinterested lecturers and spouters". He continued to back the framework knitters' attempts in 1843 to obtain a government inquiry into their conditions.

A lifetime of endeavour in the interests of the working classes, however, produced only a series of disappointments. William Cobbett's remark that Henson was one of those men "whose offensive conceit, coupled with vulgar ignorance, are sure to do injury to any cause with which they meddle...". perhaps... helps to explain the failure of some of his causes and his isolation in later years..

== Authorship ==
In 1830 Henson wrote The Civil, Political, and Mechanical History of the Framework-Knitters, Vol 1, but only the one volume, down to 1780, was published, due to a lack of public support. According to William Felkin, this was because of "his diffusive manner and some peculiar opinions set forth with needless prominence." He left behind him at his death the manuscripts of Notes of Inventions and Improvements of Lace Machines down to the year 1850, and some (or all) of these were published in an edition of 1970.

== Death ==
White's 1844 Directory shows him living in Nottingham's Lower Parliament Street with the occupation of "writer", and the 1851 census records him at 39 Broad Street, aged 64 (sic), with the occupations, "Accountant Author Trade". He died at Broad Street, aged 67, on 15 November 1852, and was buried in the churchyard of St Mary's, Nottingham.

== Assessment ==
William Felkin (1795–1874), a manufacturer and historian of the lace and hosiery industries who had been mayor of Nottingham in 1851–52, said of him: "He had little early education, but afterwards read much. He possessed an extraordinary memory, and delighted in the histories of manufactures and commerce. He knew most of the laws of his own country and France regulating these matters. His first employment was in the stocking frame, then in point net, and afterwards in bobbin net, and he knew many of those who had improved those classes of machines. An earlier writer placed him among the "worthies of Nottingham". Others differed, for which his dogmatism and warm temperament may account.

E. P. Thompson suggested, in The Making of the English Working Class, presumably on the basis of Henson's early militancy, that in the history of working-class movements between 1780 and 1832, he was one of three, with John Doherty and John Gast, who were outstanding leaders. Professor M. I. Thomas thought, in Old Nottingham (1968), that Henson was one of the most important working-class leaders of the first half of the 19th century, and possibly (about 1813–1814) the first full-time paid union official.

== Bibliography ==
- G. Henson, The civil, political, and mechanical history of the framework-knitters, in Europe and America : including a review of the political state and condition of the people of England, and an account of the rise, progress, and present state of the machinery for superseding human labour, in the various manufactures of Europe, since the fifteenth century, exhibiting the true and real cause of the present convulsed state of the western world, vol.1 (Nottingham, 1831).
