= George Loveless (preacher) =

British Methodist preacher (1797–1874)

George Loveless (2 February 1797 – 26 December 1874) was a British Methodist preacher and a leader of a group of six agricultural workers who became known as the Tolpuddle Martyrs.

== Early life ==
Loveless was born in Tolpuddle, Dorset, England to Thomas Loveless and his wife Dinah. From childhood he worked as a ploughman and, by 1830, had become a prominent community leader and Wesleyan preacher.

== Tolpuddle Martyrs ==
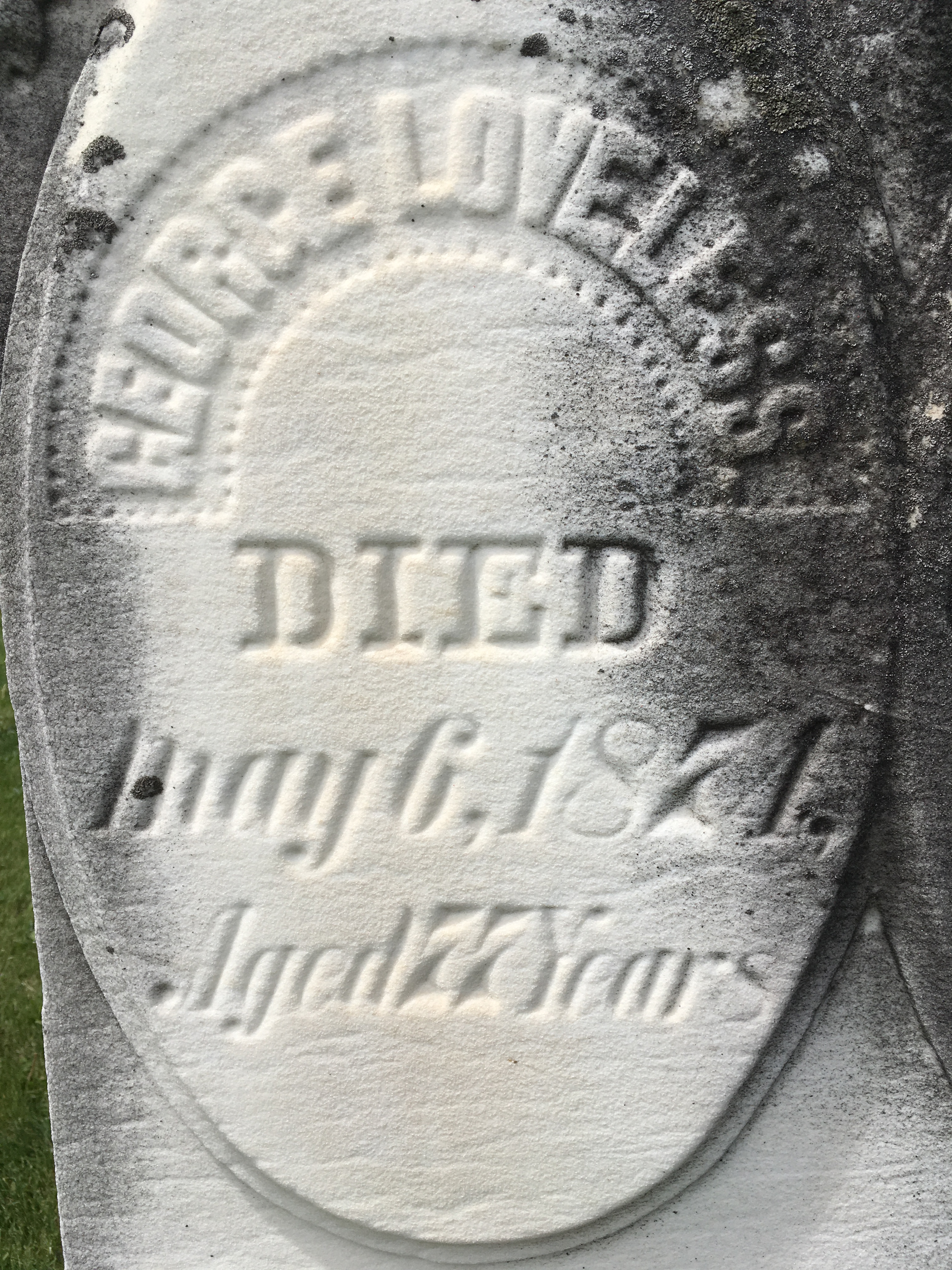
Gravestone of George Loveless in Siloam Cemetery, London, Ontario, Canada

In the early 1830s he represented agricultural labourers from Dorchester in discussions with farmers, who agreed to raise wages to ten shillings a week. However in Tolpuddle, farmers only agreed to pay nine shillings, and later reduced wages to seven shillings and threatened a further cut to six shillings. As a consequence, in October 1833 Loveless formed a Friendly Society of Agricultural Labourers.

Although trade unionism was not illegal, Loveless and his five co-leaders were found guilty of administering unlawful oaths, a felony under the Unlawful Oaths Act 1797 (37 Geo. 3. c. 123). Loveless and his co-defendants (his brother James, their brother-in-law Thomas Standfield, their nephew Thomas Standfield, James Hammett and James Brine) were found guilty at Dorchester Assizes in March 1834, and sentenced to transportation for seven years to the Australian colonies.

On 25 May 1833 Loveless was taken to Portsmouth and set sail for Van Dieman's Land, arriving on 4 September 1833. He was sent to work on the domain farm at New Town as a shepherd and stock-keeper. He was later employed by Major William de Gillern at Glenayr.

On 21 April 1834, more than 50,000 people marched in London to protest the treatment of the Tolpuddle Martyrs. In March 1836 the British government gave a full pardon to all six of the Martyrs. On hearing the news, Loveless refused immediate free passage back to Britain as he had some months previously written to his wife requesting that she join him. Once he had confirmation that she was not travelling to him, he departed on 30 January 1837 to Britain and arrived in London in June.

== Later life ==
On his return, Loveless settled on a farm near Chipping Ongar in Essex. He became an active Chartist and wrote The Victims of Whiggery, an account of his experiences.

In 1844 he emigrated with four of his fellow martyrs to the Province of Canada. Loveless and his brother James settled in London, Ontario where George took out a mortgage on a 100 acre farm. He later moved to a farm at Siloam. Loveless died on 6 March 1874 at his farm at Siloam, and was survived by his wife Elizabeth and five children. He is buried at Siloam cemetery alongside one of his fellow martyrs, Thomas Standfield.
