= John Williams (English judge) =

English Whig politician, lawyer and judge

Sir John Williams QC
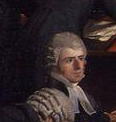
- Williams in 1820
- Born: 10 February 1777
- Died: 15 September 1846 (aged 69)
- Occupation: Judge
- Known for: Trial of the Tolpuddle Martyrs; Trial of the Flash Female Button Makers Union

Sir John Williams QC (10 February 1777 – 15 September 1846) was an English Whig politician, lawyer and judge, known for overseeing the 1830s trials of the Tolpuddle Martyrs (R v Lovelass and Others), and the Flash Female Button Makers Union.

John Williams was educated at Trinity College, Cambridge. He was elected as a Member of Parliament (MP) for Lincoln at a by-election in March 1822, and held the seat until the 1826 general election, when he was returned on 9 June for Ilchester. However, that result was overturned on 22 February 1827 after an election petition, and Williams did not return to the House of Commons until February 1830, when he was returned for Winchelsea at a by-election. He held that seat until the borough was disenfranchised at the 1832 general election.

He was made a King's Counsel in Easter Term 1827. On 28 February 1834 he was made a serjeant-at-law and raised to the bench as one of the puisne barons of the Court of Exchequer, succeeding Sir John Bayley; he was knighted on 16 April 1834. On 29 April 1834 he transferred to the Court of King's Bench as puisne justice, exchanging places with Sir James Parke. He died on 14 September 1846 and was succeeded by Sir William Erle.

Parliament of the United Kingdom
Preceded by Coningsby Waldo-Sibthorpe; Robert Percy Smith	Member of Parliament for Lincoln; 1822 – 1826; With: Robert Percy Smith	Succeeded by John Nicholas Fazakerley; Charles Sibthorp
Preceded by Stephen Lushington; Sir Isaac Coffin, Bt	Member of Parliament for Ilchester; March 1826 – June 1826; With: Richard Sharp	Succeeded by Lionel Tollemache; Felix Tollemache
Preceded by Henry Brougham; Viscount Howick	Member of Parliament for Winchelsea; Feb 1830 – 1832; With: Viscount Howick to July 1830; Henry Dundas July 1830 – April 1831; Stephen Lushington April–July 1831; James Brougham from July 1831	Constituency abolished
