= Trade union =

Organization of workers with common goals

A trade union (British English) or labor/labour union (North American English), often simply referred to as a union, is an organization of workers whose purpose is to maintain or improve the conditions of their employment, such as attaining better wages and benefits, improving working conditions and safety standards, establishing complaint procedures, developing rules governing the status of employees (including rules on promotions and just-cause conditions for termination), and protecting and increasing the bargaining power of workers.

Trade unions typically fund their head office and legal team functions through regularly imposed fees called union dues. The union representatives in the workforce are usually made up of workplace volunteers who are often appointed by members through internal democratic elections. The trade union, through an elected leadership and bargaining committee, bargains with the employer on behalf of its members, known as the rank and file, and negotiates labour contracts (collective bargaining agreements) with employers.

Unions may organize a particular section of skilled or unskilled workers (craft unionism), a cross-section of workers from various trades (general unionism), or an attempt to organize all workers within a particular industry (industrial unionism). The agreements negotiated by a union are binding on the rank-and-file members and the employer, and in some cases on other non-member workers. Trade unions traditionally have a constitution which details the governance of their bargaining unit and also have governance at various levels of government depending on the industry that binds them legally to their negotiations and functioning.

Originating in the United Kingdom, trade unions became popular in many countries during the Industrial Revolution when employment (rather than subsistence farming) became the primary mode of earning a living. Trade unions may be composed of individual workers, professionals, past workers, students, apprentices or the unemployed. Trade union density, or the percentage of workers belonging to a trade union, is highest in the Nordic countries.

== Definition ==
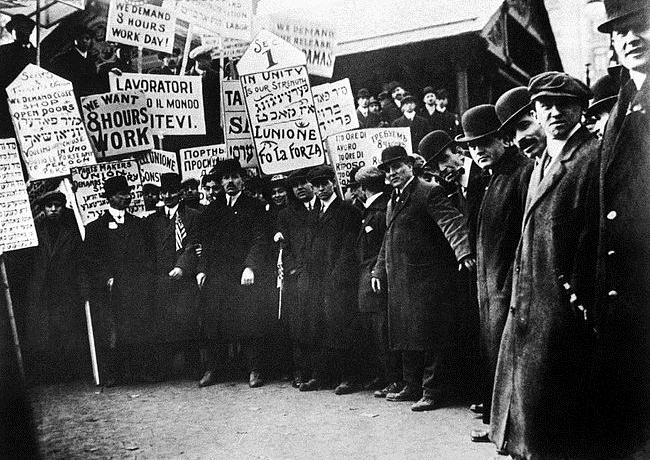
Garment workers on strike, New York City, c. 1913

Since the publication of the History of Trade Unionism (1894) by Sidney and Beatrice Webb, the predominant historical view is that a trade union "is a continuous association of wage earners for the purpose of maintaining or improving the conditions of their employment". Karl Marx described trade unions thus: "The value of labour-power constitutes the conscious and explicit foundation of the trade unions, whose importance for the ... working class can scarcely be overestimated. The trade unions aim at nothing less than to prevent the reduction of wages below the level that is traditionally maintained in the various branches of industry. That is to say, they wish to prevent the price of labour-power from falling below its value" (Capital V1, 1867, p. 1069). Early socialists also saw trade unions as a way to democratize the workplace, in order to obtain political power.

A modern definition by the Australian Bureau of Statistics states that a trade union is "an organisation consisting predominantly of employees, the principal activities of which include the negotiation of rates of pay and conditions of employment for its members".

Recent historical research by Bob James puts forward the view that trade unions are part of a broader movement of benefit societies, which includes medieval guilds, Freemasons, Oddfellows, friendly societies, and other fraternal organizations.

== History ==
=== Trade guilds ===
A collegium was any association in ancient Rome that acted as a legal entity. Following the passage of the Lex Julia during the reign of Julius Caesar (49–44 BC), and their reaffirmation during the reign of Caesar Augustus (27 BC–14 AD), collegia required the approval of the Roman Senate or the Roman emperor in order to be authorized as legal bodies. Ruins at Lambaesis date the formation of burial societies among Roman Army soldiers and Roman Navy mariners to the reign of Septimius Severus (193–211) in 198 AD. In September 2011, archaeological investigations done at the site of the artificial harbour Portus in Rome revealed inscriptions in a shipyard constructed during the reign of Trajan (98–117) indicating the existence of a shipbuilders guild. Rome's La Ostia port was home to a guildhall for a corpus naviculariorum, a collegium of merchant mariners. Collegium also included fraternities of Roman priests overseeing Sacrificium Romanam (ritual sacrifices), practising augury, keeping scriptures, arranging festivals, and maintaining specific religious cults.

=== Modern trade unions ===
While a commonly held mistaken view holds modern trade unionism to be a product of Marxism, the earliest modern trade unions predate Marx's Communist Manifesto (1848) by almost a century (and Marx's writings themselves frequently address the prior existence of the workers' movements of his time.) The origins of modern trade unions can be traced back to 18th-century Britain, where the Industrial Revolution drew masses of people, including dependents, peasants and immigrants, into cities. Britain had ended the practice of serfdom in 1574, but the vast majority of people remained as tenant-farmers on estates owned by the landed aristocracy. This transition was not merely one of relocation from rural to urban environs; rather, the nature of industrial work created a new class of "worker". A farmer worked the land, raised animals and grew crops, and either owned the land or paid rent, but ultimately sold a product and had control over his life and work. As industrial workers, however, the workers sold their work as labour and took directions from employers, giving up part of their freedom and self-agency in the service of a master. The critics of the new arrangement would call this "wage slavery", but the term that persisted was a new form of human relations: employment. Unlike farmers, workers often had less control over their jobs; without job security or a promise of an on-going relationship with their employers, they lacked some control over the work they performed or how it impacted their health and life. It is in this context that modern trade unions emerge.

In the cities, trade unions encountered much hostility from employers and government groups. In the United States, unions and unionists were regularly prosecuted under various restraint of trade and conspiracy laws, such as the Sherman Antitrust Act. Trade unions have sometimes been seen as successors to the guilds of medieval Europe, though the relationship between the two is disputed, as the masters of the guilds employed workers (apprentices and journeymen) who were not allowed to organize.

Trade unions and collective bargaining were outlawed from no later than the middle of the 14th century, when the Ordinance of Labourers was enacted in the Kingdom of England, but their way of thinking was the one that endured down the centuries, inspiring evolutions and advances in thinking which eventually gave workers more power. As collective bargaining and early worker unions grew with the onset of the Industrial Revolution, the government began to clamp down on what it saw as the danger of popular unrest at the time of the Napoleonic Wars. In 1799, the Combination Act was passed, which banned trade unions and collective bargaining by British workers. Although the unions were subject to often severe repression until 1824, they were already widespread in cities such as London. Workplace militancy had also manifested itself as Luddism and had been prominent in struggles such as the 1820 Rising in Scotland, in which 60,000 workers went on a general strike, which was soon crushed. Sympathy for the plight of the workers brought repeal of the acts in 1824, although the Combination Act 1825 restricted their activity to bargaining for wage increases and changes in working hours.

By the 1810s, the first labour organizations to bring together workers of divergent occupations were formed. Possibly the first such union was the General Union of Trades, also known as the Philanthropic Society, founded in 1818 in Manchester. The latter name was to hide the organization's real purpose in a time when trade unions were still illegal.

=== National general unions ===
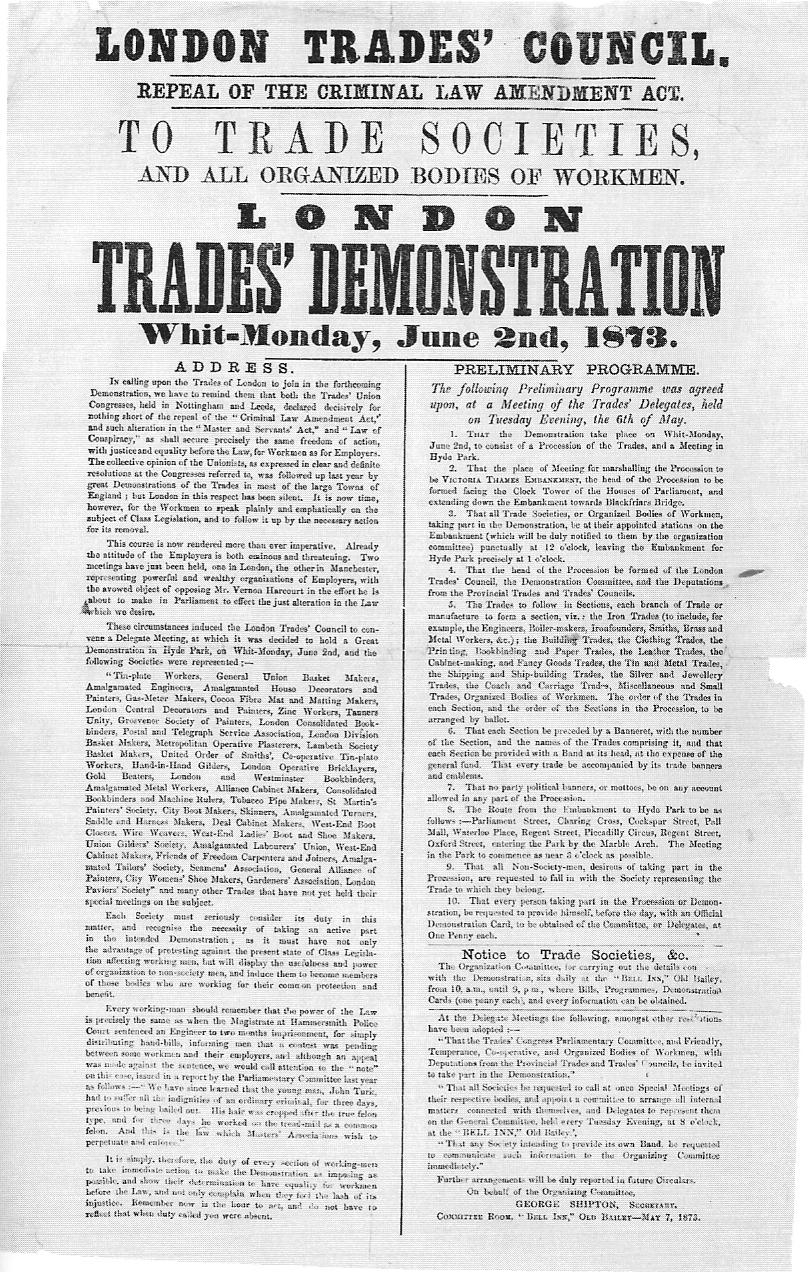
Poster issued by the London Trades Council, advertising a demonstration held on 2 June 1873

The first attempts at forming a national general union in the United Kingdom were made in the 1820s and 30s. The National Association for the Protection of Labour was established in 1830 by John Doherty, after an apparently unsuccessful attempt to create a similar national presence with the National Union of Cotton-spinners. The Association quickly enrolled approximately 150 unions, consisting mostly of textile related unions, but also including mechanics, blacksmiths, and various others. Membership rose to between 10,000 and 20,000 individuals spread across the five counties of Lancashire, Cheshire, Derbyshire, Nottinghamshire and Leicestershire within a year. To establish awareness and legitimacy, the union started the weekly Voice of the People publication, having the declared intention "to unite the productive classes of the community in one common bond of union."

In 1834, the Welsh socialist Robert Owen established the Grand National Consolidated Trades Union. The organization attracted a range of socialists from Owenites to revolutionaries and played a part in the protests after the Tolpuddle Martyrs' case, but soon collapsed.

More permanent trade unions were established from the 1850s, better resourced but often less radical. The London Trades Council was founded in 1860, and the Sheffield Outrages spurred the establishment of the Trades Union Congress in 1868, the first long-lived national trade union centre. By this time, the existence and the demands of the trade unions were becoming accepted by liberal middle-class opinion. In Principles of Political Economy (1871) John Stuart Mill wrote:

If it were possible for the working classes, by combining among themselves, to raise or keep up the general rate of wages, it needs hardly be said that this would be a thing not to be punished, but to be welcomed and rejoiced at. Unfortunately the effect is quite beyond attainment by such means. The multitudes who compose the working class are too numerous and too widely scattered to combine at all, much more to combine effectually. If they could do so, they might doubtless succeed in diminishing the hours of labour, and obtaining the same wages for less work. They would also have a limited power of obtaining, by combination, an increase of general wages at the expense of profits.

Beyond this claim, Mill also argued that, because individual workers had no basis for assessing the wages for a particular task, labour unions would lead to greater efficiency of the market system.

=== Legalization, expansion and recognition ===
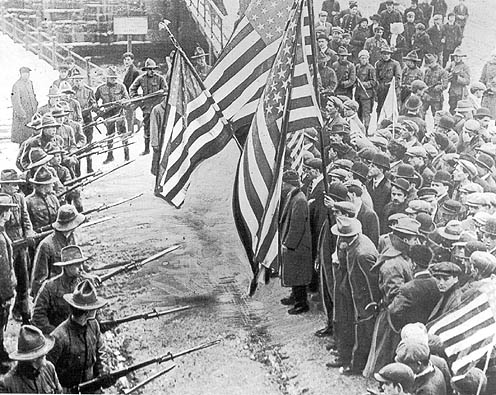
Trade union demonstrators held at bay by soldiers during the 1912 Lawrence textile strike in Lawrence, Massachusetts

British trade unions were finally legalized in 1872, after a Royal Commission on Trade Unions in 1867 agreed that the establishment of the organizations was to the advantage of both employers and employees.

This period also saw the growth of trade unions in other industrializing countries, especially the United States, Germany and France.

In the United States, the first effective nationwide labour organization was the Knights of Labor, in 1869, which began to grow after 1880. Legalization occurred slowly as a result of a series of court decisions. The Federation of Organized Trades and Labor Unions began in 1881 as a federation of different unions that did not directly enrol workers. In 1886, it became known as the American Federation of Labor or AFL.

In Germany, the Free Association of German Trade Unions was formed in 1897 after the conservative Anti-Socialist Laws of Chancellor Otto von Bismarck were repealed.

In France, labour organization was illegal until the 1884 Waldeck Rousseau laws. The Fédération des bourses du travail was founded in 1887 and merged with the Fédération nationale des syndicats (National Federation of Trade Unions) in 1895 to form the General Confederation of Labour.

In a number of countries during the 20th century, including in Canada, the United States and the United Kingdom, legislation was passed to provide for the voluntary or statutory recognition of a union by an employer.

== Prevalence worldwide ==
World map with countries shaded according to their trade union density rate with statistics provided by the International Labour Organization Department of Statistics: 90.0–99.9% 80.0–89.9% 70.0–79.9% 60.0–69.9% 50.0–59.9% 40.0–49.9% 30.0–39.9% 20.0–29.9% 10.0–19.9% 0.0–9.9% No data

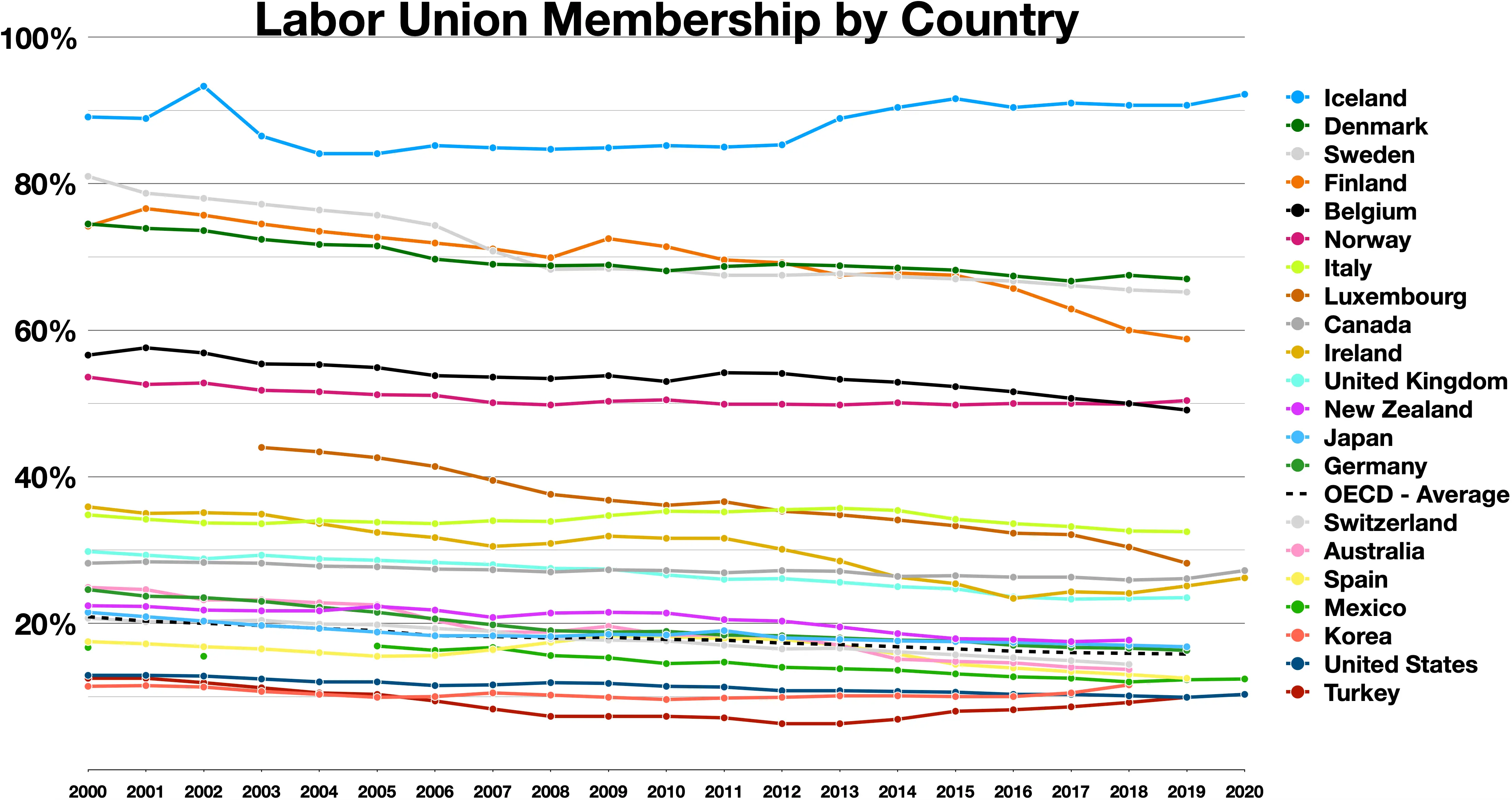
Labour union membership by country

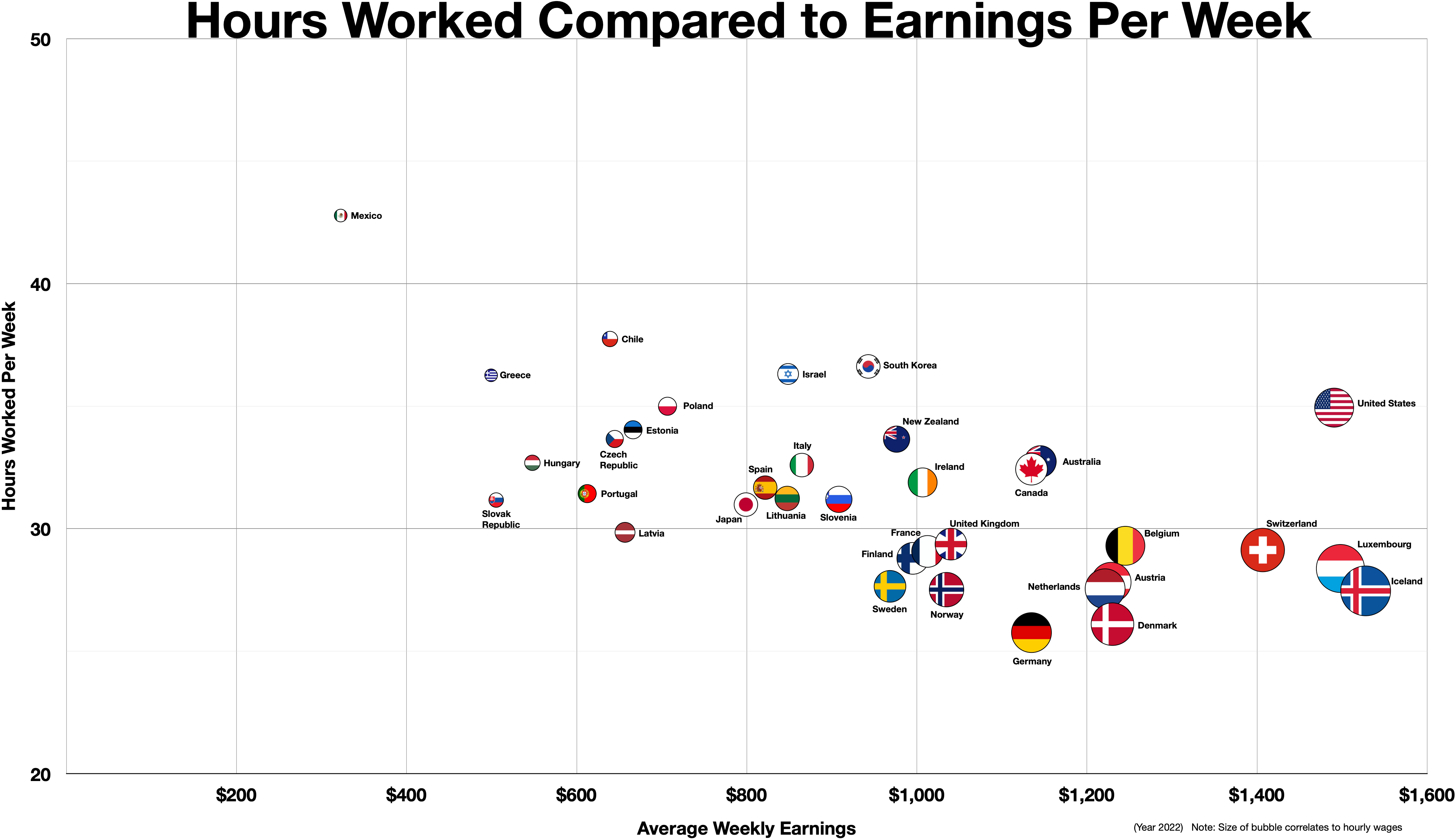
Hours worked compared to earnings per week

Union density has been steadily declining from the OECD average of 35.9% in 1998 to 27.9% in the year 2018. The main reasons for these developments are a decline in manufacturing, increased globalization, and governmental policies.

The decline in manufacturing is the most direct influence, as unions were historically beneficial and prevalent in the sector; for this reason, there may be an increase in unions in developing nations as OECD nations continue to export manufacturing industries to these markets. The second reason is globalization, which makes it harder for unions to maintain standards across countries. The last reason is governmental policies. These come from both sides of the political spectrum. In the UK and US, it has been mostly right-wing proposals that make it harder for unions to form or that limit their power. On the other side, there are many social policies such as minimum wage, paid vacation, parental leave, etc., that decrease the need to be in a union.

The prevalence of labour unions can be measured by "union density", which is expressed as a percentage of the total number of workers in a given location who are trade union members. The table below shows the percentage across OECD members.

Union density across OECD members (in %)
Country	2020	2018	2017	2016	2015	2000
Australia	..	13.7	14.7	..	..	24.9
Austria	..	26.3	26.7	26.9	27.4	36.9
Belgium	..	50.3	51.9	52.8	54.2	56.6
Canada	27.2	25.9	26.3	26.3	29.4	28.2
Chile	..	16.6	17.0	17.7	16.1	11.2
Czech Republic	..	11.5	11.7	12.0	12.0	27.2
Denmark	..	66.5	66.1	65.5	67.1	74.5
Estonia	..	4.3	4.3	4.4	4.7	14.0
Finland	..	60.3	62.2	64.9	66.4	74.2
France	..	8.8	8.9	9.0	9.0	10.8
Germany	..	16.5	16.7	17.0	17.6	24.6
Greece	..	..	..	19.0	..	..
Hungary	..	7.9	8.1	8.5	9.4	23.8
Iceland	92.2	91.8	91.0	89.8	90.0	89.1
Ireland	26.2	24.1	24.3	23.4	25.4	35.9
Israel	..	..	25.0	..	..	37.7
Italy	..	34.4	34.3	34.4	35.7	34.8
Japan	..	17.0	17.1	17.3	17.4	21.5
Korea	..	..	10.5	10.0	10.0	11.4
Latvia	..	11.9	12.2	12.3	12.6	..
Lithuania	..	7.1	7.7	7.7	7.9	..
Luxembourg	..	31.8	32.1	32.3	33.3	..
Mexico	12.4	12.0	12.5	12.7	13.1	16.7
Netherlands	..	16.4	16.8	17.3	17.7	22.3
New Zealand	..	..	17.3	17.7	17.9	22.4
Norway	..	49.2	49.3	49.3	49.3	53.6
Poland	..	..	..	12.7	..	23.5
Portugal	..	..	..	15.3	16.1	..
Slovak Republic	..	..	..	10.7	11.7	34.2
Slovenia	..	..	..	20.4	20.9	44.2
Spain	..	13.6	14.2	14.8	15.2	17.5
Sweden	..	65.5	65.6	66.9	67.8	81.0
Switzerland	..	14.4	14.9	15.3	15.7	20.7
Turkey	..	9.2	8.6	8.2	8.0	12.5
United Kingdom	..	23.4	23.2	23.7	24.2	29.8
United States	10.3	10.1	10.3	10.3	10.6	12.9

Source: OECD

== Structure and politics ==
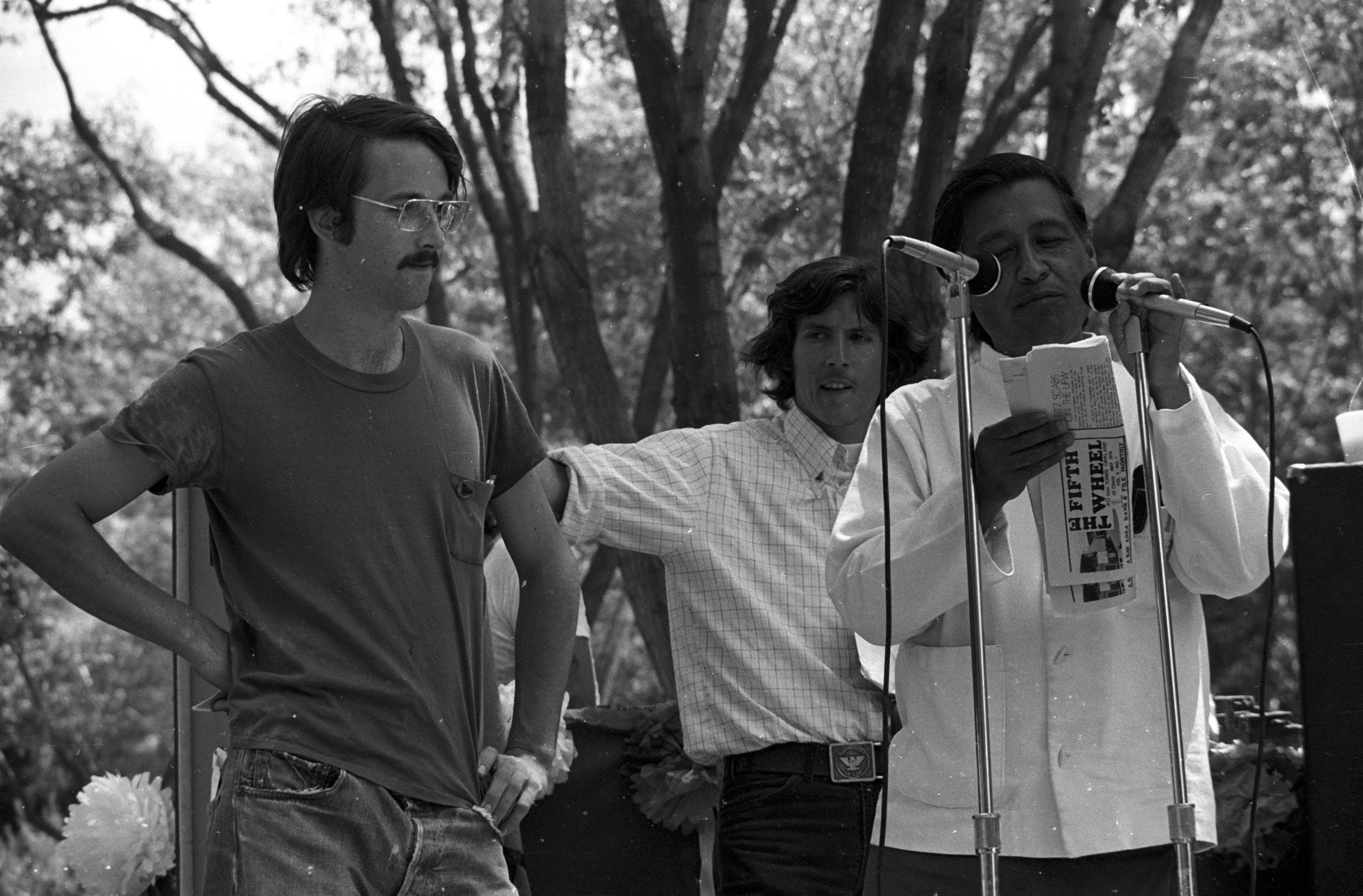
Cesar Chavez speaking at a 1974 United Farm Workers rally in Delano, California. The UFW during Chavez's tenure was committed to restricting immigration.

Unions may organize a particular section of skilled workers (craft unionism, traditionally found in Australia, Canada, Denmark, Norway, Sweden, Switzerland, the UK and the US), a cross-section of workers from various trades (general unionism, traditionally found in Australia, Belgium, Canada, Denmark, Netherlands, the UK and the US), or attempt to organize all workers within a particular industry (industrial unionism, found in Australia, Canada, Germany, Finland, Norway, South Korea, Sweden, Switzerland, the UK and the US). These unions are often divided into "locals", and united in national federations. These federations themselves will affiliate with Internationals, such as the International Trade Union Confederation. However, in Japan, union organization is slightly different due to the presence of enterprise unions, i.e. unions that are specific to a plant or company. These enterprise unions, however, join industry-wide federations which in turn are members of Rengo, the Japanese national trade union confederation.

In Western Europe, professional associations often carry out the functions of a trade union. In these cases, they may be negotiating for white-collar or professional workers, such as physicians, engineers or teachers. In Sweden the white-collar unions have a strong position in collective bargaining where they cooperate with blue-colar unions in setting the "mark" (the industry norm) in negotiations with the employers' association in manufacturing industry.

A union may acquire the status of a "juristic person" (an artificial legal entity), with a mandate to negotiate with employers for the workers it represents. In such cases, unions have certain legal rights, most importantly the right to engage in collective bargaining with the employer (or employers) over wages, working hours, and other terms and conditions of employment. The inability of the parties to reach an agreement may lead to industrial action, culminating in either strike action or management lockout, or binding arbitration. In extreme cases, violent or illegal activities may develop around these events.

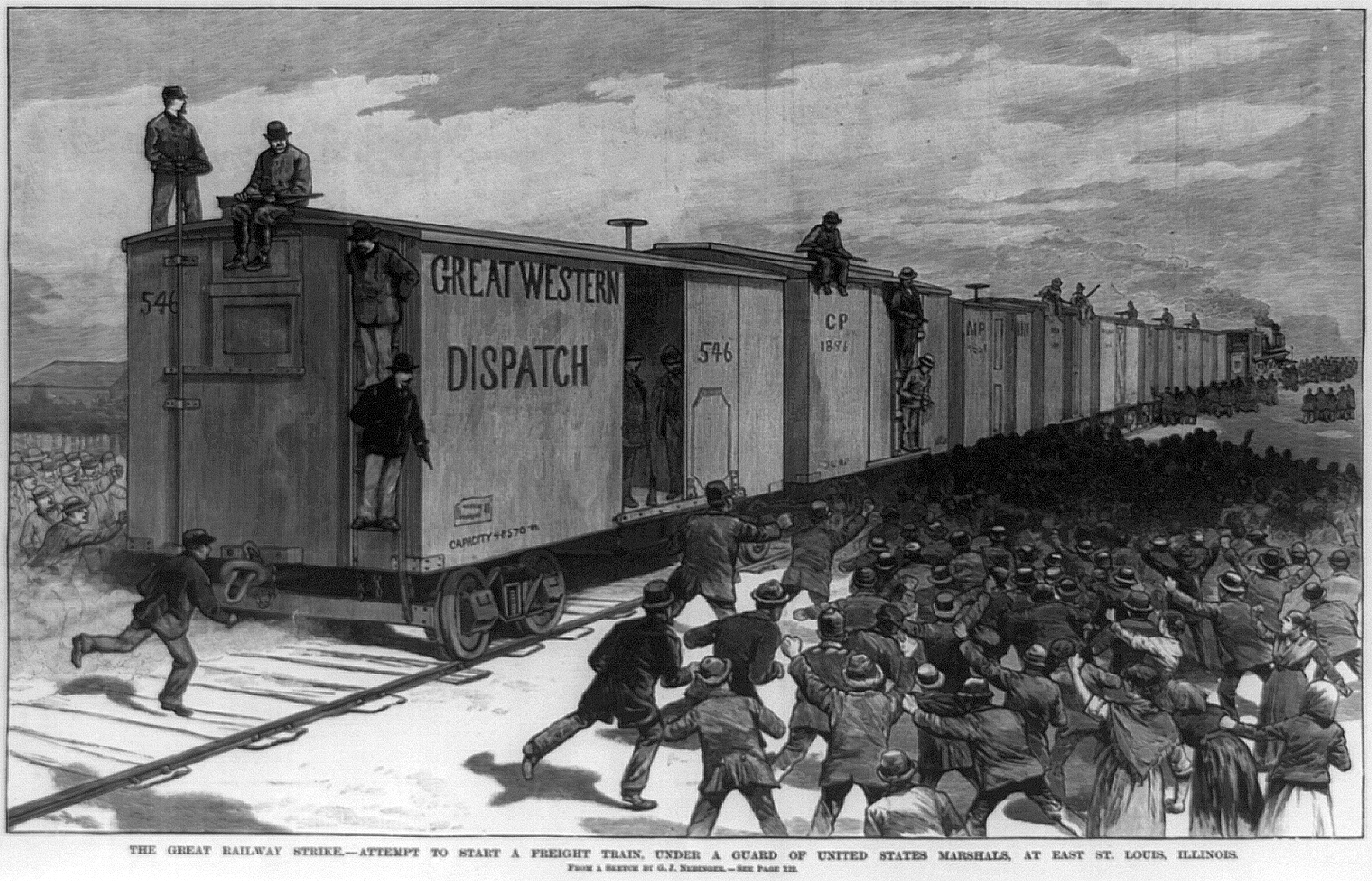
The Great Southwest railroad strike of 1886 was a trade union strike involving more than 200,000 workers.

In some regions, unions may face active repression, either by governments or by extralegal organizations, with many cases of violence, some having led to deaths, having been recorded historically.

Unions may also engage in broader political or social struggle. Social Unionism encompasses many unions that use their organizational strength to advocate for social policies and legislation favourable to their members or to workers in general. As well, unions in some countries are closely aligned with political parties. Many Labour parties were founded as the electoral arms of trade unions.

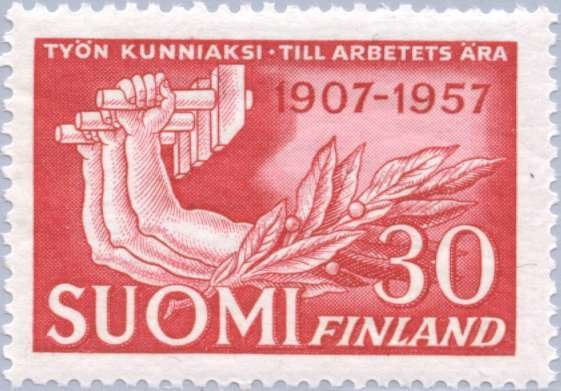
In 1957, the Finnish Post Office issued a stamp in honour of the 50th anniversary of the trade union activity in Finland.

Unions are also delineated by the service model and the organizing model. The service model union focuses more on maintaining worker rights, providing services, and resolving disputes. Alternately, the organizing model typically involves full-time union organizers, who work by building up confidence, strong networks, and leaders within the workforce; and confrontational campaigns involving large numbers of union members. Many unions are a blend of these two philosophies, and the definitions of the models themselves are still debated. Informal workers often face unique challenges when trying to participate in trade union movements as formal trade union organizations recognized by the state and employers may not accommodate for the employment categories common in the informal economy. Simultaneously, the lack of regular work locations and loopholes relating to false self-employment add barriers and costs for the trade unions when trying to organize the informal economy. This has been a significant threshold to labour organizing in low-income countries, where the labour force mostly works in the informal economy.

In the United Kingdom, the perceived left-leaning nature of trade unions (and their historical close alignment with the Labour Party) has resulted in the formation of a reactionary right-wing trade union called Solidarity which is supported by the far-right BNP. In Denmark, there are some newer apolitical "discount" unions who offer a very basic level of services, as opposed to the dominating Danish pattern of extensive services and organizing.

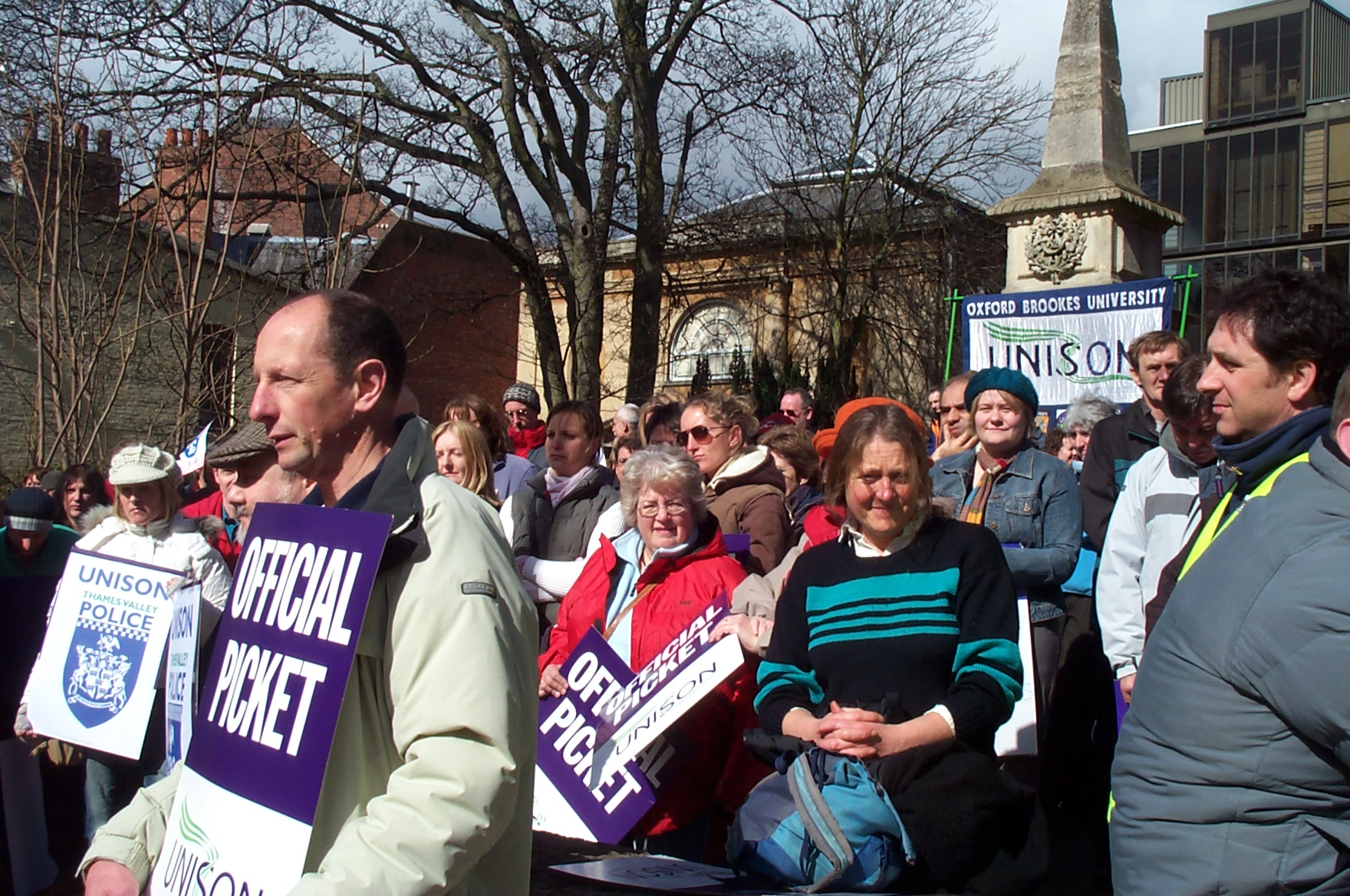
A rally of the trade union UNISON in Oxford during a strike on 28 March 2006

In contrast, in several European countries (e.g. Belgium, Denmark, the Netherlands and Switzerland), religious unions have existed for decades. These unions typically distanced themselves from some of the doctrines of orthodox Marxism, such as the preference of atheism and from rhetoric suggesting that employees' interests always are in conflict with those of employers. Some of these Christian unions have had some ties to centrist or conservative political movements, and some do not regard strikes as acceptable political means for achieving employees' goals. In Poland, the biggest trade union Solidarity emerged as an anti-communist movement with religious nationalist overtones and today it supports the right-wing Law and Justice party.

Although their political structure and autonomy varies widely, union leaderships are usually formed through democratic elections. Leaders of unions can show on average a political bias relative to union members.

=== International unions ===
The oldest global trade union organizations include the World Federation of Trade Unions created in 1945. The largest trade union federation in the world is the Brussels-based International Trade Union Confederation (ITUC), created in 2006, which has approximately 309 affiliated organizations in 156 countries and territories, with a combined membership of 166 million. National and regional trade unions organizing in specific industry sectors or occupational groups also form global union federations, such as UNI Global, IndustriALL, the International Transport Workers' Federation, the International Federation of Journalists, the International Arts and Entertainment Alliance and Public Services International.

== Labour law ==
Union law varies from country to country, as does the function of unions. For example, German and Dutch unions have played a greater role in management decisions through participation in supervisory boards and co-determination than other countries. Moreover, in the United States, collective bargaining is most commonly undertaken by unions directly with employers, whereas in Austria, Denmark, Germany or Sweden, unions most often negotiate with employers associations, a form of sectoral bargaining.

Concerning labour market regulation in the EU, Gold (1993) and Hall (1994) have identified three distinct systems of labour market regulation, which also influence the role that unions play:

- "In the Continental European System of labour market regulation, the government plays an important role as there is a strong legislative core of employee rights, which provides the basis for agreements as well as a framework for discord between unions on one side and employers or employers' associations on the other. This model was said to be found in EU core countries such as Belgium, France, Germany, the Netherlands and Italy, and it is also mirrored and emulated to some extent in the institutions of the EU, due to the relative weight that these countries had in the EU until the EU expansion by the inclusion of 10 new Eastern European member states in 2004.
- In the Anglo-Saxon System of labour market regulation, the government's legislative role is much more limited, which allows for more issues to be decided between employers and employees and any union or employers' associations which might represent these parties in the decision-making process. However, in these countries, collective agreements are not widespread; only a few businesses and a few sectors of the economy have a strong tradition of finding collective solutions in labour relations. Ireland and the UK belong to this category, and in contrast to the EU core countries above, these countries first joined the EU in 1973.
- In the Nordic System of labour market regulation, the government's legislative role is limited in the same way as in the Anglo-Saxon system. However, in contrast to the countries in the Anglo-Saxon system category, this is a much more widespread network of collective agreements, which covers most industries and most firms. This model was said to encompass Denmark, Finland, Norway and Sweden. Here, Denmark joined the EU in 1973, whereas Finland and Sweden joined in 1995."

The United States takes a more laissez-faire approach, setting some minimum standards but leaving most workers' wages and benefits to collective bargaining and market forces. Thus, it comes closest to the above Anglo-Saxon model. Also, the Eastern European countries that have recently entered into the EU come closest to the Anglo-Saxon model.

In contrast, in Germany, the relation between individual employees and employers is considered to be asymmetrical. In consequence, many working conditions are not negotiable due to a strong legal protection of individuals. However, the German flavour or works legislation has as its main objective to create a balance of power between employees organized in unions and employers organized in employers' associations. This allows much wider legal boundaries for collective bargaining, compared to the narrow boundaries for individual negotiations. As a condition to obtain the legal status of a trade union, employee associations need to prove that their leverage is strong enough to serve as a counterforce in negotiations with employers. If such an employee's association is competing against another union, its leverage may be questioned by unions and then evaluated in labour court. In Germany, only very few professional associations obtained the right to negotiate salaries and working conditions for their members, notably the medical doctor's association Marburger Bund and the pilots association Vereinigung Cockpit. The engineer's association Verein Deutscher Ingenieure does not strive to act as a union, as it also represents the interests of engineering businesses.

Beyond the classification listed above, unions' relations with political parties vary. In many countries unions are tightly bonded, or even share leadership, with a political party intended to represent the interests of the working class. Typically, this is a left-wing, socialist, or social democratic party, but many exceptions exist, including some of the aforementioned Christian unions. In the United States, trade unions are almost always aligned with the Democratic Party with a few exceptions. For example, the International Brotherhood of Teamsters has supported Republican Party candidates on a number of occasions and the Professional Air Traffic Controllers Organization (PATCO) endorsed Ronald Reagan in 1980.

In the United Kingdom, the trade union movement's relationship with the Labour Party frayed as the party leadership embarked on privatization plans at odds with what unions see as the worker's interests. However, it strengthened after the Labour party's election of Ed Miliband, who defeated his brother David Miliband to become leader of the party. Additionally, in the past, there was a group known as the Conservative Trade Unionists, or CTU, formed of people who sympathized with right-wing Conservative policy but were Trade Unionists.

=== Shop types ===
Companies that employ workers with a union generally operate on one of several models:

- A closed shop (US) or a "pre-entry closed shop" (UK) employs only people who are already union members. The compulsory hiring hall is an example of a closed shop—in this case the employer must recruit directly from the union, as well as the employee working strictly for unionized employers.
- A union shop (US) or a "post-entry closed shop" (UK) employs non-union workers as well but sets a time limit within which new employees must join a union.
- An agency shop requires non-union workers to pay a fee to the union for its services in negotiating their contract. This is sometimes called the Rand formula.
- An open shop does not require union membership in employing or keeping workers. Where a union is active, workers who do not contribute to a union may include those who approve of the union contract (free riders) and those who do not. In the United States, state level right-to-work laws mandate the open shop in some states. In Germany only open shops are legal; that is, all discrimination based on union membership is forbidden. This affects the function and services of the union.

An EU case concerning Italy stated that, "The principle of trade union freedom in the Italian system implies recognition of the right of the individual not to belong to any trade union ("negative" freedom of association/trade union freedom), and the unlawfulness of discrimination liable to cause harm to non-unionized employees."

In the United Kingdom, previous to this EU jurisprudence, a series of laws introduced during the 1980s by Margaret Thatcher's government restricted closed and union shops. All agreements requiring a worker to join a union are now illegal. In the United States, the Taft–Hartley Act of 1947 outlawed the closed shop.

In 2006, the European Court of Human Rights found Danish closed-shop agreements to be in breach of Article 11 of the European Convention on Human Rights and Fundamental Freedoms. It was stressed that Denmark and Iceland were among a limited number of contracting states that continue to permit the conclusion of closed-shop agreements.

== Impact ==
=== Economics ===
The academic literature shows substantial evidence that trade unions reduce economic inequality. The economist Joseph Stiglitz has asserted that, "Strong unions have helped to reduce inequality, whereas weaker unions have made it easier for CEOs, sometimes working with market forces that they have helped shape, to increase it." Evidence indicates that those who are not members of unions also see higher wages due to the presence of unions. Researchers suggest that unions set industrial norms as firms try to stop further unionization or losing workers to better-paying competitors. The decline in unionization since the 1960s in the United States has been associated with a pronounced rise in income and wealth inequality and, since 1967, with loss of middle class income. Right-to-work laws have been linked to greater economic inequality in the United States.

Research from Norway has found that high unionization rates lead to substantial increases in firm productivity, as well as increases in workers' wages. Research from Belgium also found productivity gains, although smaller. However, other research in the United States has found that unions can harm profitability, employment and business growth rates. UK research on employment, wages, productivity, and investment found union density improved all metrics - but only until a limit. Forming U-shaped curves, after an optimal density, more unionization worsened employment, wages, etc. Research from the Anglosphere indicates that unions can provide wage premiums and reduce inequality while reducing employment growth and restricting employment flexibility. Some trade unions oppose approaches which increase productivity, such as automation.

A 2026 study in the Quarterly Journal of Economics found, in the case of Norway, that the costs of higher wages for unionized labour in the average private sector firm were shared among shareholders (who earned lower profits) and consumers (who paid higher prices), as well as offset by improvements in productivity. In less competitive sectors, such as manufacturing, the costs were largely passed on to consumers (along with productivity improvements).

In the United States, the outsourcing of labour to Asia, Latin America, and Africa has been partially driven by increasing costs of union partnership, which gives other countries a comparative advantage in labour, making it more efficient to perform labour-intensive work there. Trade unions have been accused of benefiting insider workers and those with secure jobs at the cost of outsider workers, consumers of the goods or services produced, and the shareholders of the unionized business. Economist Milton Friedman sought to show that unionization produces higher wages (for the union members) at the expense of fewer jobs, and that, if some industries are unionized while others are not, wages will tend to decline in non-unionized industries.

Trade unions frequently advocate for seniority-based compensation and against meritocracy.

Some research, such as that conducted by the Australian Centre for Industrial Relations Research and Training, argues that unionized workers enjoy better conditions and wages than those who are not unionized.

=== Health ===
In the United States, higher union density has been associated with lower suicide/overdose deaths. Decreased unionization rates in the United States have been linked to an increase in occupational fatalities.

=== Politics ===
In the United States, the weakening of unions has been linked to more favourable electoral outcomes for the Republican Party. Legislators in areas with high unionization rates are more responsive to the interests of the poor, whereas areas with lower unionization rates are more responsive to the interests of the rich. Higher unionization rates increase the likelihood of parental leave policies being adopted. Republican-controlled states are less likely to adopt more restrictive labour policies when unions are strong in the state.

Research in the United States found that American congressional representatives were more responsive to the interests of the poor in districts with higher unionization rates. Another 2020 American study found an association between US state level adoption of parental leave legislation and trade union strength.

In the United States, unions have been linked to lower racial resentment among whites. Membership in unions increases political knowledge, in particular among those with less formal education.

Public-sector trade unions have been associated with increased cost of government.

== See also ==
- Critique of work
- Digital Product Passport
- Excess profits tax
- Global labor arbitrage
- Labor federation competition in the United States
- Labor Management Reporting and Disclosure Act
- Labour inspectorate
- List of trade unions
- Police union
- Profit margin
- Progressive Librarians Guild
- Project Labor Agreement
- Salting (union organizing)
- Tenants union
- Union busting
  - Strikebreaker
- Workplace politics

== Bibliography ==
- Braunthal, Gerard (1956). "The German Free Trade Unions during the Rise of Nazism". Journal of Central European Affairs. 14 (4): 339–353.
- Cole, G. D. H. (2010). Attempts at General Union. Taylor & Francis. ISBN 978-1-136-88516-7.
- James, Robert Noel (2001). Craft, Trade or Mystery. Tighes Hill.
- Moses, John A. (December 1973). "The Trade Union Issue In German Social Democracy 1890–1900". Internationale Wissenschaftliche Korrespondenz zur Geschichte der Deutschen Arbeiterbewegung (19/20): 1–19.
- Schneider, Michael (1991). A brief history of the German trade unions. Bonn: JHW Dietz Nachfolger.
- Webb, Sidney; Webb, Beatrice (1920). "Chapter I". History of Trade Unionism. Longman.
