= John Doherty (trade unionist) =

Irish trade unionist and radical (1798–1854)

John Doherty (1798–1854) was an Irish trade unionist, radical and factory reformer who devoted his life to political and social reform. He was born in Buncrana in Inishowen on the north coast of County Donegal in Ireland.

He married his wife, Laura, in 1821 and they had four children. He died aged 56, of suspected heart disease.

== Early life ==
Doherty began his career as a cotton spinner as a child worker just ten years old in his home town of Buncrana. He later moved to Larne, a small town just north of Belfast, where he again worked in the booming cotton industry which was benefiting partly from the investment of Manchester manufacturers. At a time of mass emigration to England and Scotland, it seems almost natural that Doherty should follow this path and in 1816 he relocated to Manchester, the home of the cotton industry, possibly in search of higher wages offered to workers with his significant experience.

== Doherty and trade unionism ==
Following Doherty's relocation to Manchester, it was not long before he was involved with the factory workers' growing movement for higher wages and better conditions. In 1818 he was a leading figure in the spinners' strike and was imprisoned for two years. Rather than deterring Doherty this merely enhanced his desire to obtain better conditions for himself and his fellow workers and he continued to be an active member of the Amalgamated Association of Operative Cotton Spinners following his release. In 1828 Doherty was elected leader of the Manchester Spinners Union and the following year he led the group in a six-month strike against a reduction in wages. Starvation forced the strikers back to work and although this was considered to be a failure, following low turnout, Doherty remained determined and soon founded the General Union of Cotton Spinners.

The General Union of Cotton Spinners was an ambitious project, intending to link the English spinners' unions with those of Ireland and Scotland. Doherty realised that a small number of spinners striking would change very little, but bringing an entire industry to a halt would force a rethink in wages and conditions. This was a little too ambitious: in 1831 the union collapsed following six months of strike action. The planned united front never formed, since the Scottish and Irish spinners refused to join in, leaving the protest in tatters.

Doherty was also involved with the creation of the National Association for the Protection of Labour but this ambitious project, intended to provide a general union of workers of all trades, was similarly poorly supported and collapsed in 1832.

E. P. Thompson suggested, in The Making of the English Working Class, that in the history of working-class movements between 1780 and 1832, he was one of three, with Gravener Henson and John Gast, who had been outstanding leaders.

== Doherty the bookseller ==
From 1832 Doherty took a back seat in the union movement and established himself as a bookseller and printer, working out of Withy Grove in Manchester. Although less involved with the general movement, Doherty continued to publish a radical journal entitled The Voice of the People which focused on the plight of the factory and mill workers and called for reform. In an attempt to spread the word of his causes, Doherty later opened a free reading area within his shop where members of the public were encouraged to relax and read his articles calling for reform.

== Doherty and the factory reform movement ==
It was whilst working as a publisher that Doherty's interest in the factory reform movement peaked and following his release from prison due to slanderous comments made in The Voice of the People, he became involved with fellow radical Robert Owen. Together they set about obtaining fairer working hours and conditions for factory workers and formed the Society for Promoting National Regeneration.

Doherty published The Poor Man's Advocate and within this told the story of Robert Blincoe, a former child labourer. This led Doherty to turn his interest to the working conditions of women and children, particularly the exceptionally long days many were expected to work. Doherty set about campaigning for a reduction of working hours to no more than ten per day, known as the Ten Hours Bill. Parliament finally agreed to these requests as part of the 1847 Factory Acts and Doherty's relentless work had paid off.

== Doherty's private life ==
Numerous accusations regarding John Doherty's character were made during his career in an attempt to discredit him and the trade union movement he supported. It was suggested that Doherty had initially gained employment in Manchester using a forged certificate of character from Belfast. This was an accusation that Doherty never fully refuted and was used by his opponents to show he was not a trustworthy character, particularly during the ten-hour movement debate.

Doherty was also accused of serving a prison sentence after committing a 'gross assault upon a woman' following a minor incident with his wife. This was not the case and seems to have been confused either purposely or otherwise with the time Doherty spent in prison following the 1818 strikes and later in 1832 following libel action.

== Doherty's death ==
Little is known regarding Doherty's activities immediately before his death. He ceased trading as a printer and bookseller in 1842 and appears to have led a quiet life until his death on 14 April 1854. The coroner reported that Doherty's death was due to 'disease of the heart, which was evidently of long duration from the great enlargement of the heart'.
