= Tolpuddle Martyrs =

English agricultural labourers convicted for unionising

Tolpuddle martyrs
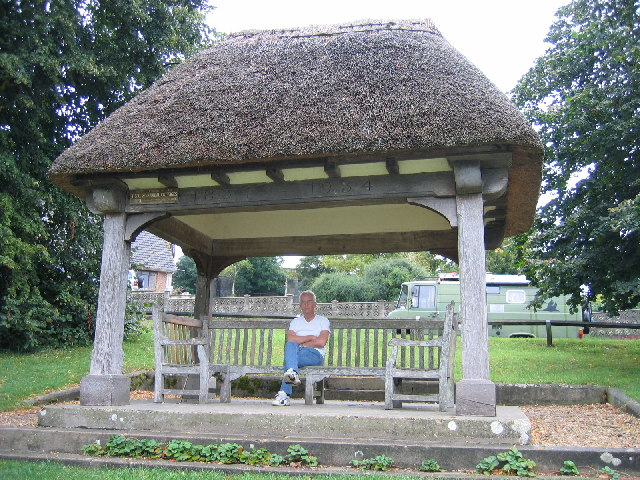
- The shelter in Tolpuddle erected as a memorial in 1934
- Date: 1833–1834
- Location: Tolpuddle, Dorset, England
- Participants: James Brine; James Hammett; George Loveless; James Loveless; John Standfield; Thomas Standfield; Sir John Williams
- Outcome: Transportation to Australia (1834); Pardoned (1836); Returned to England (1837–1839).

Tolpuddle (England)

The Tolpuddle Martyrs were six agricultural labourers from the village of Tolpuddle in Dorset, England, who were arrested and tried in 1834 for swearing a secret oath as members of a friendly society. Led by George Loveless, the group had formed the Friendly Society of Agricultural Labourers during a labour dispute over wage cuts that reduced their income to near-starvation levels. Such unions were technically legal, but the British government, wary of organised labour, invoked an obscure 1797 law against "unlawful oaths" to bring charges. In R v Loveless and Others the men were convicted and sentenced to penal transportation in Australia. They were pardoned in 1836 after mass protests by sympathisers and support from Lord John Russell, and returned to England between 1837 and 1839. Most of the men later immigrated to Canada.

The Tolpuddle Martyrs became a popular cause for the early union and workers' rights movements. Annual events in Tolpuddle honour their legacy.

== Historical events ==
=== Background ===
In 1799 and 1800, the Combination Acts in the Kingdom of Great Britain had outlawed "combining" or organising to gain better working conditions, passed by Parliament because of a political scare following the French Revolution. In 1824, the Combination Acts were repealed due to their unpopularity and replaced with the Combinations of Workmen Act 1825, which legalised trade union organisations but severely restricted their activity.

By the start of the 19th century the county of Dorset had become synonymous with poorly paid agricultural labour. In 1815, after the end of the Napoleonic Wars, 13% of the county's population were receiving poor relief, and this worsened in the subsequent agricultural recession. By 1830 conditions were so bad that large numbers of labourers joined the Swing Riots that affected southern England that autumn; more than forty disturbances occurred in the county, involving two thirds of the labouring population in some parishes. A few landowners temporarily increased wages as a concession, but law enforcement was also increased and many labourers were arrested and imprisoned, and within a short time the gains in wages were reversed.

In 1833 six men from the village of Tolpuddle founded the Friendly Society of Agricultural Labourers as a friendly society to protest against the gradual lowering of agricultural wages. These Tolpuddle labourers refused to work for less than 10 shillings a week, although by this time wages had been reduced to seven shillings and were due to be further reduced to six. The Friendly Society's rules show it was clearly structured as a friendly society that operated as a trade-specific benefit society, led by George Loveless, a Methodist local preacher, and meeting in the house of Thomas Standfield. Groups such as the Friendly Society would often use a skeleton painting as part of their initiation process, where the newest member would be blindfolded and made to swear a secret oath. The blindfold would then be removed and they would be presented with the skeleton painting to warn them of their own mortality but also to remind them of what happens to those who break their promises. An example of such a skeleton painting is on display at the People's History Museum in Manchester.

=== Prosecution and sentencing ===
In 1834, James Frampton, a magistrate and local landowner in Tolpuddle, wrote to Home Secretary Lord Melbourne to complain about the union, who recommended Frampton invoke the Unlawful Oaths Act 1797, an obscure law promulgated in response to the Spithead and Nore mutinies which prohibited the swearing of secret oaths. The Friendly Society's members — James Brine, James Hammett, George Loveless, George's brother James Loveless, George's brother in-law Thomas Standfield, and Thomas's son John Standfield — were arrested. They were tried together before the judge Sir John Williams in the case R v Lovelass and Others. All six were found guilty of swearing secret oaths and sentenced to transportation to Australia.

When sentenced to seven years' penal transportation, George Loveless wrote on a scrap of paper lines from the union hymn "The Gathering of the Unions":

God is our guide! from field, from wave,
From plough, from anvil, and from loom;
We come, our country's rights to save,
And speak a tyrant faction's doom:
We raise the watch-word liberty;
We will, we will, we will be free!

=== Transportation, pardon, return ===
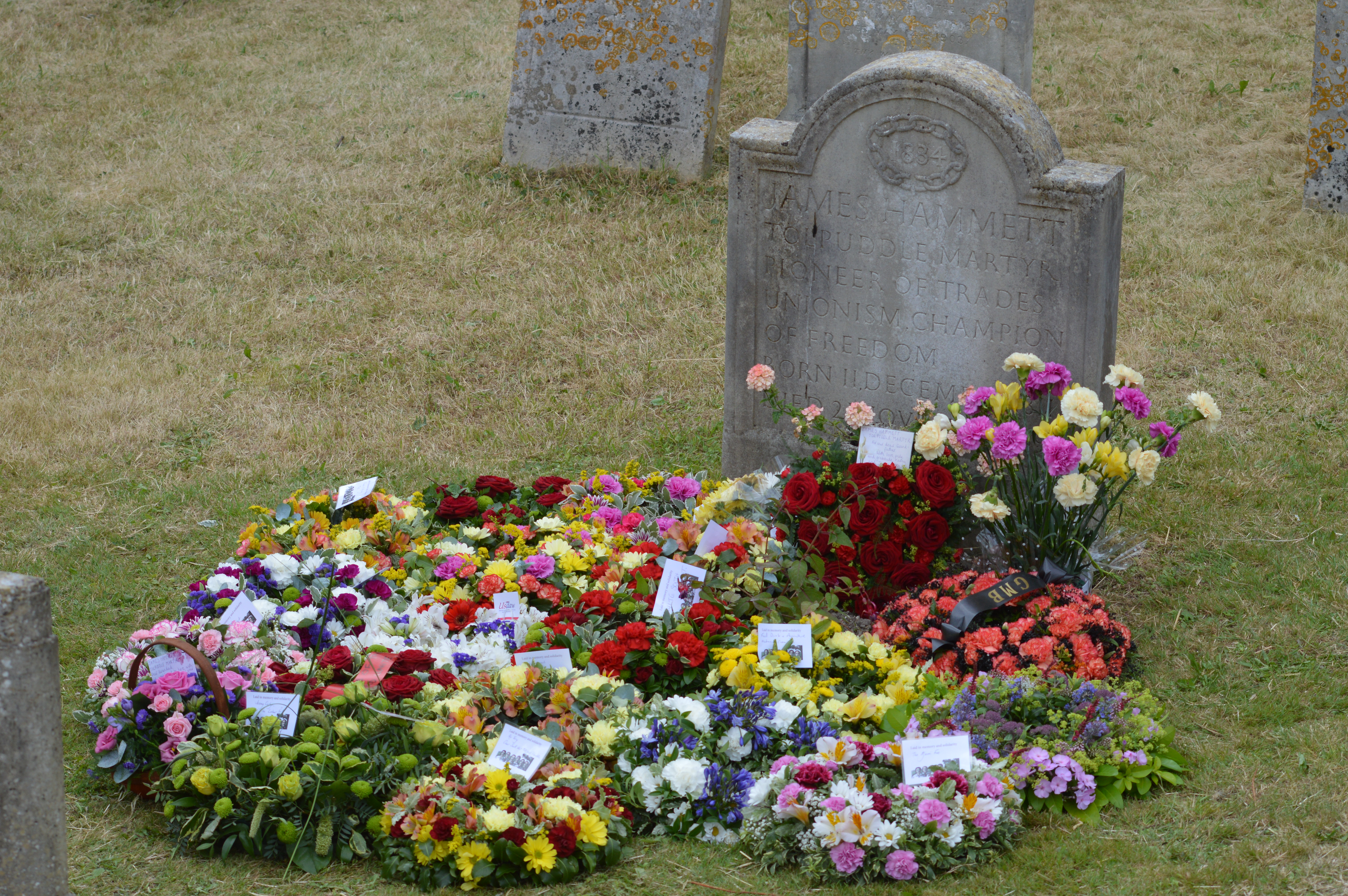
Grave of James Hammett after the wreath laying ceremony during the 2016 Tolpuddle Martyrs festival

James Loveless, the two Standfields, Hammett and Brine sailed on the Surry to New South Wales, where they arrived in Sydney on 17 August 1834. George Loveless was delayed due to illness and left later on the William Metcalf to Van Diemen's Land, reaching Hobart on 4 September.

Of the five who landed in Sydney, Brine and the Standfields were assigned as farm labourers to free settlers in the Hunter Valley. Hammett was assigned to the Queanbeyan farm of Edward John Eyre, and James Loveless was assigned to a farm at Strathallan. In Hobart, George Loveless was assigned to the viceregal farm of Lieutenant Governor Sir George Arthur.

In England they became popular heroes and 800,000 signatures were collected for their release. Their supporters organised a political march, one of the first successful marches in the United Kingdom, and all were eventually pardoned in March 1836 on the condition of good conduct, with the support of Lord John Russell, who had recently become Home Secretary. When the pardon reached George Loveless some delay was caused in his leaving due to no word from his wife as to whether she was to join him in Van Diemen's Land. On 23 December 1836, a letter was received to the effect that she was not coming and Loveless sailed from Van Diemen's Land on 30 January 1837, arriving in England on 13 June 1837.

In New South Wales, there were delays in obtaining an early sailing due to tardiness in the authorities confirming good conduct with the convicts' assignees and then getting them released from their assignments. James Loveless, Thomas and John Standfield, and James Brine departed Sydney on the John Barry on 11 September 1837, reaching Plymouth (one of the departure points for convict transport ships) on 17 March 1838. A plaque next to the Mayflower Steps in Plymouth's historical Barbican area commemorates the arrival. Although due to depart with the others, James Hammett was detained in Windsor, charged with an assault, while the others left the colony. It was not until March 1839 that he sailed, arriving in England in August 1839.

=== Later life ===
The Lovelesses, Standfields and Brine first settled on farms near Chipping Ongar, Essex, upon their return from transportation, with the Lovelesses and Brine living at Tudor Cottage in Greensted Green. The five later emigrated to the town of London, Upper Canada (in present-day Ontario), where there is now a monument in their honour and an affordable housing co-op and trade union complex named after them. George Loveless and Thomas Standfield are buried in Siloam Cemetery on Fanshawe Park Road East in London, Ontario. James Brine died in 1902, having lived in nearby Blanshard Township since 1868, and is buried in St. Marys Cemetery, St. Marys, Ontario.

Hammett returned to Tolpuddle and died in the Dorchester workhouse in 1891.

== Museums ==
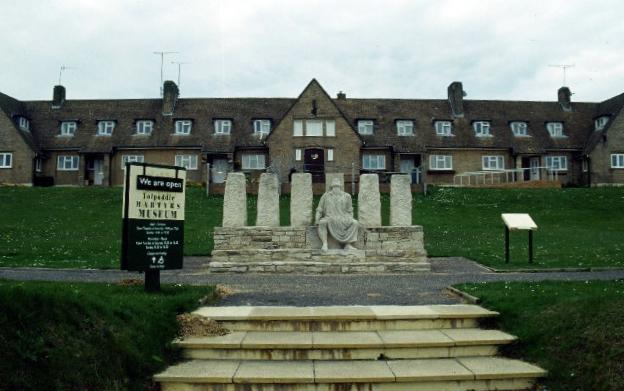
The Tolpuddle Martyrs' Museum

The Tolpuddle Martyrs Museum in Tolpuddle, Dorset, features displays and interactive exhibits about the martyrs and their effect on trade unionism. The Shire Hall in Dorchester, where the Tolpuddle Martyrs were tried, is now a museum, including material about them.

== Cultural and historical significance ==
A monument was erected in their honour in Tolpuddle in 1934, and a sculpture of the martyrs, made in 2001, stands in the village in front of the Tolpuddle Martyrs Museum.

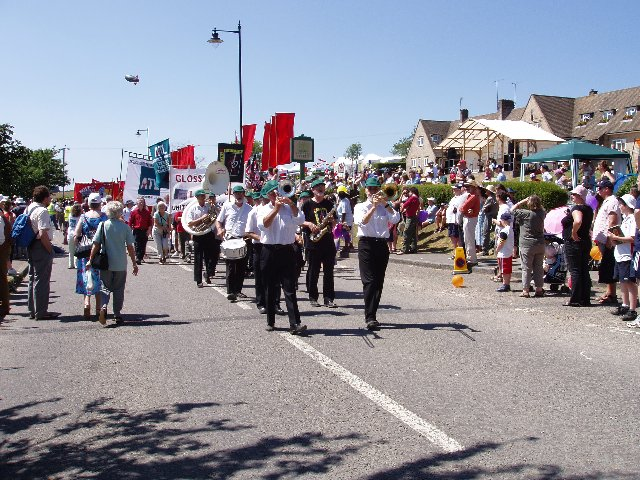
Martyrs' Day commemoration in 2005

The annual Tolpuddle Martyrs' Festival is usually held in the third week of July, organised by the Trades Union Congress (TUC), and features a parade of banners from many trade unions, a memorial service, speeches, music and comedy. Recent festivals have featured speakers such as Tony Benn, musicians such as Billy Bragg, comedian Stewart Lee and local folk singers including Graham Moore, as well as others from all around the world.

The courtroom where the martyrs were tried, which has been little altered in 200 years, in Dorchester's Shire Hall, is being preserved as part of a heritage scheme.

The story of Tolpuddle has enriched the history of trade unionism, but the significance of the Tolpuddle Martyrs continues to be debated since Sidney and Beatrice Webb wrote the History of Trade Unionism (1894) and continues with such works as Bob James's Craft Trade or Mystery (2001).

The following places are named in their honour:

- Tolpuddle Street, Islington, London
- Tolpuddle Way, Kirkdale, Liverpool
- Tolpuddle Vineyard, Richmond, Tasmania

In 1984, a mural was created in Edward Square, off Copenhagen Street, Islington, to commemorate the gathering of people organised by the Central Committee of the Metropolitan Trade Unions to demonstrate against the penal transportation of the Tolpuddle Martyrs to Australia. The mural was painted by artist David Bangs.

In 1985 a memorial plaque for the Tolpuddle Martyrs was installed in Garema Place in the centre of Australia's capital city Canberra.

Comrades is a 1986 British historical drama film directed by Bill Douglas and starring an ensemble cast including James Fox, Robert Stephens and Vanessa Redgrave. Through the pictures of a travelling lanternist, it depicts the story of the Tolpuddle Martyrs.

A workshop production, based on the film Comrades, was performed at the Northcott Theatre, Exeter on 23 March 2023 and told the story of The Tolpuddle Martyrs up to the time of their arrest. It was written and directed by Tony Lidington and performed by drama students from the University of Exeter.

A musical drama by Alan Plater and Vince Hill, 'Tolpuddle', was broadcast on BBC Radio 4 on 16 October 1982.

The Tolpuddle Martyrs also find reference in a poem by Daljit Nagra: "Vox Populi, Vox Dei".

The men who returned to Plymouth from Australia were commemorated with a plaque made by Clifford Harper at a ceremony in March 2020.

== Image gallery ==
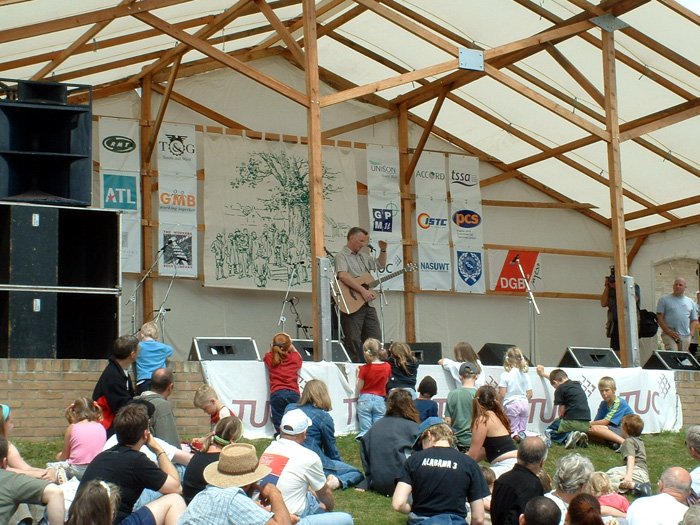
Tolpuddle Martyrs' Festival in 2004

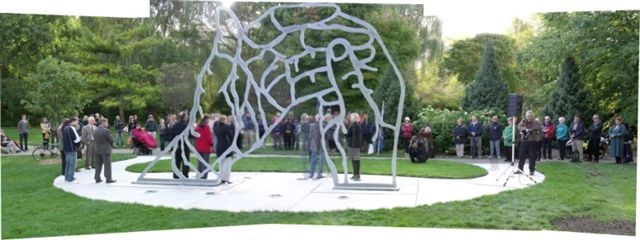
Tolpuddle Martyrs' memorial sculpture (London, Ontario, Canada) Leslie Putnam & David Bobier Artists

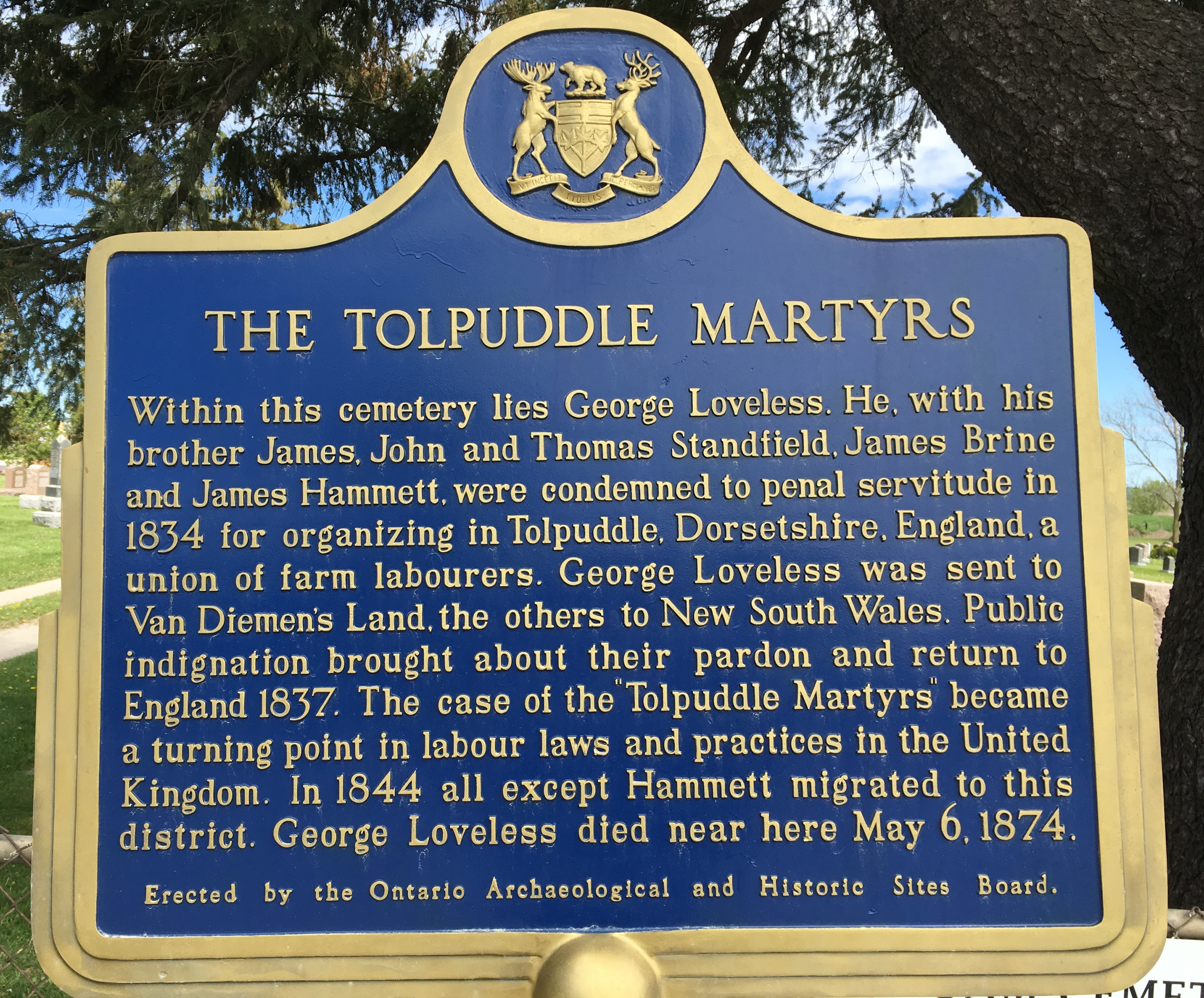
Tolpuddle Martyrs plaque, Siloam Cemetery, London, Ontario, Canada

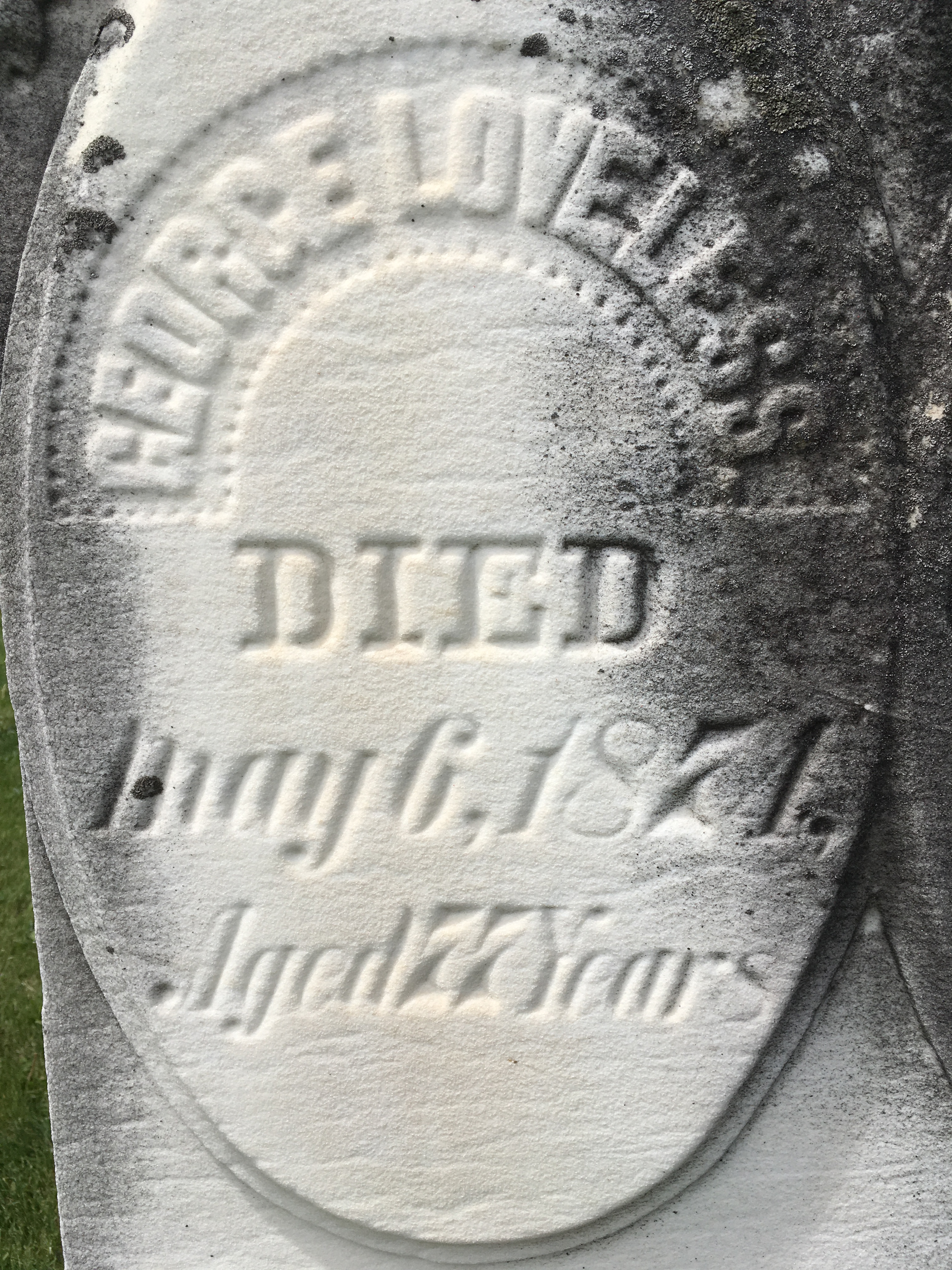
Gravestone of George Loveless in Siloam Cemetery, London, Ontario, Canada

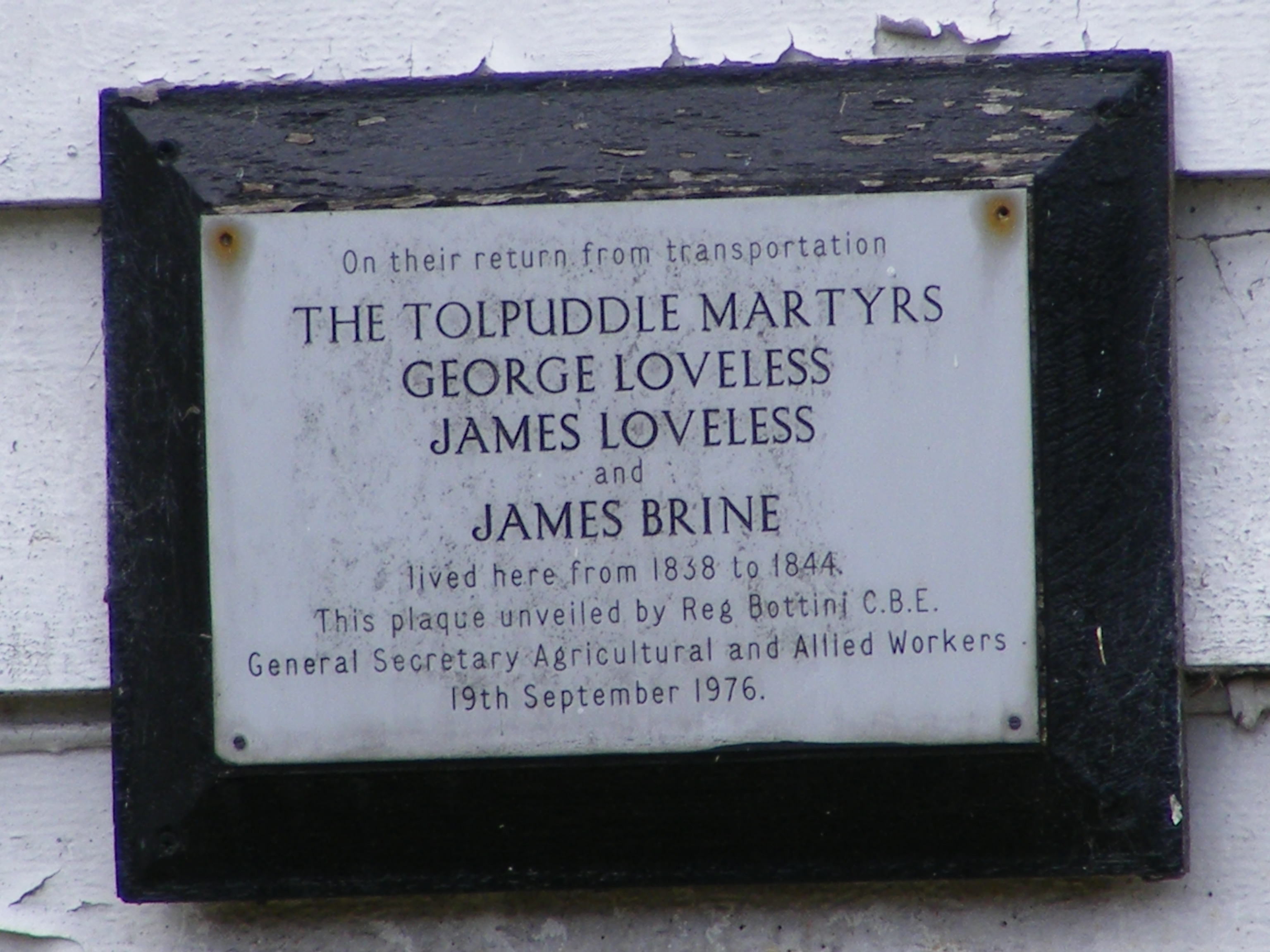
Plaque on wall of Tudor Cottage, Greensted Green, Essex, where three of the Martyrs lived on their return from transportation

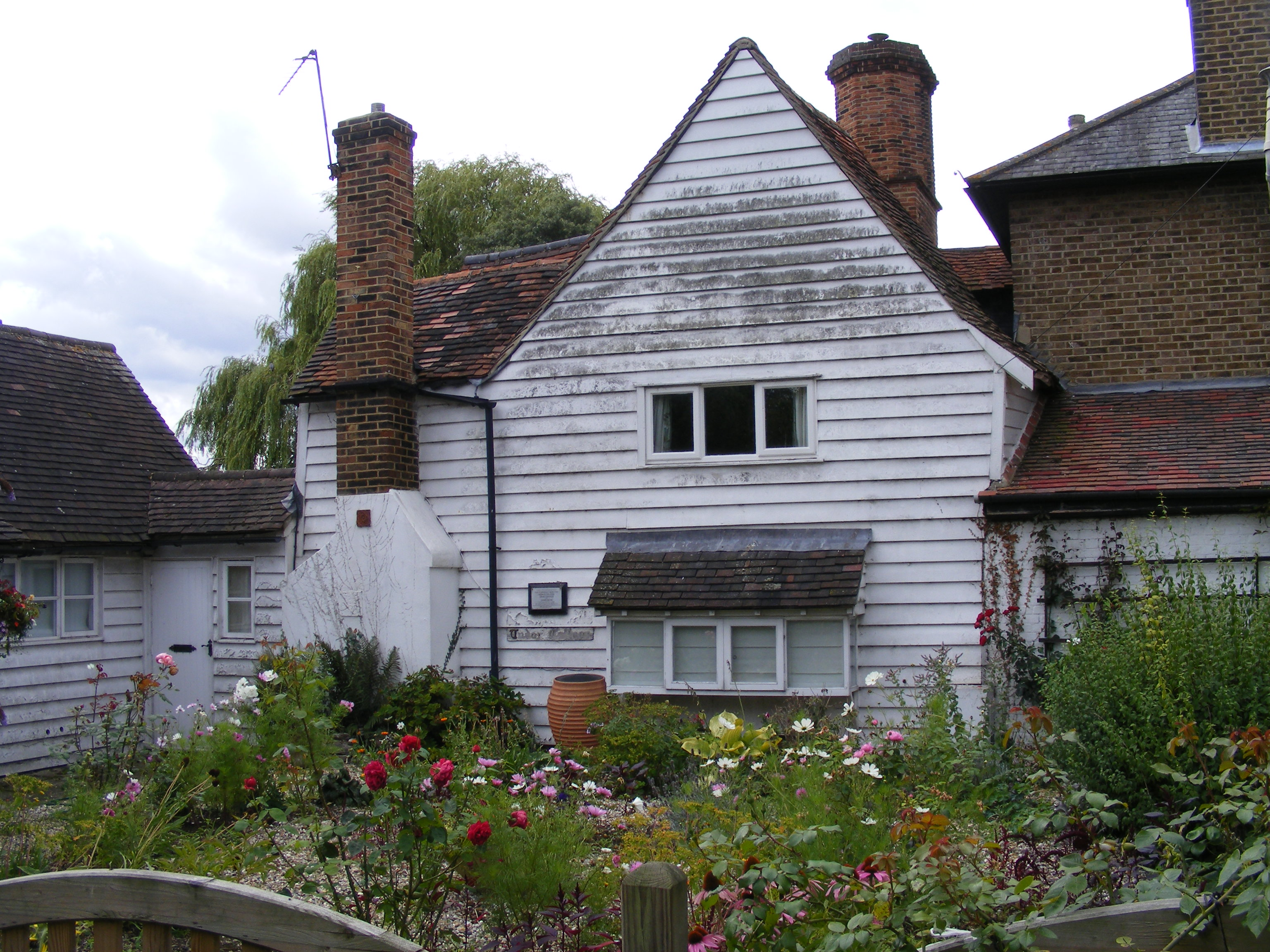
Tudor Cottage, Greensted Green, Essex: home of three Martyrs on their return from transportation

== See also ==
- Chartism
- Convicts in Australia
- Enclosure
- Peterloo Massacre
- UK labour law
