= National Association for the Protection of Labour =

The National Association for the Protection of Labour was one of the first attempts at creating a national trade union centre in the United Kingdom. The organization was established in July, 1830 by John Doherty, after an apparently unsuccessful attempt to create a similar national presence with the National Union of Cotton-spinners.

Doherty was the first secretary, and the Association quickly enrolled approximately 150 unions. These consisted mostly of textile related unions, but also included mechanics, blacksmiths, and various others. Within the first nine months, Webb estimates that membership was between 10,000 and 20,000 individuals spread across the five counties of Lancashire, Cheshire, Derby, Nottingham, and Leicester.

As a part of establishing awareness and legitimacy, union officials started an unsuccessful weekly paper, the United Trades Co-operative Journal. This was soon followed in 1831 by a larger publication, the Voice of the People, having the declared intention "to unite the productive classes of the community in one common bond of union."

With notable exceptions, the association continued to grow and expand, reaching 100,000 members and a circulation of 30,000 for the Voice of the People. However, by mid 1832, the National Association for the Protection of Labour appears to have rapidly faded. Disagreements between Doherty and the executive committee; the disappearance of the weekly paper; and fractured relations with its constituent unions, particularly from Manchester, ultimately inflicted "a fatality" upon the association.

The place of the association was soon filled by numerous other general trade societies - most directly by the Operative Builders' Union.
