= Unlawful Oaths Act =

Stock short title used for legislation

Unlawful Oaths Act (with its variations) is a stock short title used for legislation in the United Kingdom and the Republic of Ireland relating to unlawful oaths.

The bill for an act with this short title may have been known as an Unlawful Oaths Bill during its passage through Parliament.

Unlawful Oaths Acts may be a generic name either for legislation bearing that short title or for all legislation which relates to the unlawful oaths.

== List ==
The Unlawful Oaths Acts 1797 and 1812

- The Unlawful Oaths Act 1797 (37 Geo. 3. c. 123)
- The Unlawful Oaths Act 1812 (52 Geo. 3. c. 104)

The Unlawful Oaths (Ireland) Acts

- The Unlawful Oaths (Ireland) Act 1810 (50 Geo. 3. c. 102). Sometimes called the Unlawful Oaths Act 1810.
- The Unlawful Oaths (Ireland) Act 1823 (4 Geo. 4. c. 87). Sometimes called the Unlawful Oaths Act 1823.
- The act 7 & 8 Vict. c. 78, sometimes called the Unlawful Oaths (Ireland) Act 1844, the Unlawful Oaths Continuance Act, or the Unlawful Oaths Act.
- The act 8 & 9 Vict. c. 55, sometimes called the Unlawful Oaths (Ireland) Act 1845, the Unlawful Oaths Amendment and Continuance Act, or the Unlawful Oaths Act.
- The act 14 & 15 Vict. c. 48, sometimes called the Unlawful Oaths (Ireland) Act 1851, or the Unlawful Oaths Continuance Act, or the Unlawful Oaths Act.
- The act 19 & 20 Vict. c. 78, sometimes called the Unlawful Oaths (Ireland) Act 1856, or the Unlawful Oaths Amendment Continuance Act.
- The act 25 & 26 Vict. c. 32, sometimes called the Unlawful Oaths (Ireland) Act 1862, the Unlawful Oaths (Ireland) Act Continuance Act, the Unlawful Oaths Continuance Act, or the Unlawful Oaths Act.

Unlawful Oaths Acts were also passed in 1839, 1848 and 1875.

== Unlawful Oaths Act 1797 ==
Unlawful Oaths Act 1797 (Note: The citation of this act by this short title was authorised by section 1 of, and the first schedule to, the Short Titles Act 1896. Due to the repeal of those provisions it is now authorised by section 19(2) of the Interpretation Act 1978.)
- Act of Parliament
- Parliament of Great Britain
- Long title: An act for more effectually preventing the administering or taking of unlawful oaths.
- Citation: 37 Geo. 3. c. 123
- Territorial extent: Great Britain

Dates
- Royal assent: 19 July 1797
- Commencement: 19 July 1797 (Note: The Acts of Parliament (Commencement) Act 1793.)
- Repealed: 21 May 1981
Other legislation
Amended by	Statute Law Revision Act 1888; Criminal Law Act 1967
Repealed by	Statute Law (Repeals) Act 1981

Status: Repealed

Text of statute as originally enacted

The Unlawful Oaths Act 1797 (37 Geo. 3. c. 123) was an act passed by the British Parliament. The act was passed in the aftermath of the Spithead and Nore mutinies and aimed at clandestine political associations and ad hoc agreements such as those which had bound several of the mutineers.

The whole act was repealed by section 1(1) of, and part I of schedule 1 to, the Statute Law (Repeals) Act 1981, which came into force on 21 May 1981.

The act was used against the Tolpuddle Martyrs.

== See also ==
- List of short titles

== Bibliography ==
- Andrew Reed. The Peace Preservation (Ireland) Acts 1856-1875; the Protection of Life and Property in certain parts of Ireland Act, 1871; and the Unlawful Oaths (Ireland) Acts 1810-1848. Alexander Thom. Dublin. 1875. Reviewed at "Reviews" (1875) 9 Irish Law Times and Solicitors' Journal 590 (4 December 1875).
