= Operative Builders' Union =

Former trade union of the United Kingdom

- Founded: 1831
- Dissolved: 1834
- Location: United Kingdom
- Members: 40,000 (1833)
- Key people: John Embleton (Gen Sec)
- Publication: Pioneer
- Affiliations: GNCTU

The Operative Builders' Union was an early trade union federation representing construction and maintenance workers in the United Kingdom.

The union dated its formation to 1831, although it is not known to have existed with certainty until 1833. By then, it consisted of seven craft unions: the Operative Society of Bricklayers, Friendly Society of Operative House Carpenters and Joiners, Operative United Painters, Operative Federal Plasterers, Operative Plumbers' and Glaziers' Society, Slaters Society and Friendly Society of Operative Stonemasons. Each affiliate was organised in several districts, which had a central lodge. Each year, one of these affiliate's lodges would provide the Grand Lodge Committee, which arranged co-ordination between the affiliates. The location was decided at an twice annual conference, which was known as the "Builders' Parliament". The headquarters of the union moved each year: it was in Huddersfield in 1832, Birmingham in 1833, and Manchester in 1834.

The union grew rapidly, with 6,000 members at the start of 1833, but 40,000 later in the year; it was particularly strong in London, Birmingham, Manchester, Liverpool and Newcastle. The growth was primarily due to its opposition to the contracting out of work. It also campaigned against mechanisation, piecework, and the recruitment of too many apprentices, and in favour of a set wage scale for each job role. This was strongly opposed by masters in the trades, and in both Birmingham and Manchester, union members were denied work.

In the hope of gaining broader support, the union affiliated to Robert Owen's Grand National Consolidated Trades Union. In 1834, it became an integral part of the Grand National, renaming itself as the National Building Guild. However, the Grand National soon collapsed, and the guild similarly dissolved around the turn of 1834 and 1835. Despite this, several of the guild's affiliates survived.
