= The Dark Tower (Lewis novel) =

Incomplete manuscript written by C. S. Lewis

- First UK edition
- Author: C. S. Lewis
- Publisher: William Collins, Sons
- Publication date: 1977
- ISBN: 978-0-156-23930-1

The Dark Tower is an incomplete manuscript written by C. S. Lewis that appears to be an unfinished sequel to the science fiction novel Out of the Silent Planet, though doubts have been raised about its authenticity. Perelandra instead became the second book of Lewis' Space Trilogy, concluded by That Hideous Strength. Walter Hooper, Lewis' literary executor, titled the fragment and published it in the 1977 collection The Dark Tower and Other Stories. The Lewis scholar Kathryn Lindskoog challenged the authenticity of the work, but in 2003 Alastair Fowler established its authenticity.

== Plot summaries ==
The story deals with an early rendition of interdimensional travel. A fictional Lewis himself narrates, as he does in Perelandra, but Elwin Ransom appears as a supporting character. The story begins with a discussion of time travel among several academics at a university (subsequently identified as Cambridge) during summer vacation. They conclude that it is impossible to violate the laws of space-time in such a way. However, after the discussion, one of the men (Orfieu) unveils an invention he believes allows people to see through time. The group uses this "chronoscope" to observe an alien world they call "Othertime" (he does not know if it is future or past), where a group of human automatons work to construct a tower at the bidding of the story's villain, the "Unicorn", a devilish but human (or possibly semi-human) character with a single horn growing out of his forehead. The Unicorn stings people, apparently volunteers, causing them to become automatons (the "Jerkies").

After a while MacPhee, a character who appears in That Hideous Strength (though here he is a Scot, not an Irishman), points out that the "Dark Tower" is in fact a replica of the new Cambridge University Library. This suggests Othertime is the far future, with a replica of an ancient monument being constructed.

It is discovered that Orfieu's assistant, Scudamour, has a double in Othertime. Increasingly, the observers wonder if Othertime really is the past or future, or whether it is some other reality. Scudamour's double grows a sting and becomes the new Unicorn. During one viewing session, Scudamour sees the Unicorn about to sting the double of his fiancée, Camilla. In a blind fury, he rushes at the screen, and somehow switches bodies with the Unicorn. The remainder of the text deals with his experiences in Othertime, as well as his colleagues' attempt to hunt down the Unicorn in this world.

In Othertime, Scudamour survives by playing on his authority, his only card, while he tries to learn. He discovers to his amazement that there is a chronoscope in the Unicorn's room where he stung victims – but it is now broken. He refrains from stinging Camilla, and tries to plan their escape. It appears there is some sort of war (being waged by the "White Riders", who want to remove the stingers from the "unicorns") against the Othertime government. He reads in a library about the Othertimer's time-science. A theory is given of multiple timelines; these do not seem to split off from different outcomes, like quantum realities, but simply proceed separately. However, they can be controlled, and contact between them can be made. References are made to the changeling myth. The law is stated that "Any two time-lines approximate to the exact degree to which their material contents are alike," and it is revealed that an experiment with a replica railway shed in the right place had already been successful in allowing a controlled transfer of minds. The text cuts abruptly with Scudamour still reading.

== Origin ==
In his introduction to The Dark Tower and Other Stories, Hooper states that he rescued an untitled manuscript in Lewis' handwriting of the story from a bonfire of the author's writings early in 1964, several months after Lewis' death. The 64-page manuscript appears to have originally had at least 66 pages, two of which are now missing. If the text did at one time continue past the 66th page, these additional pages are also lost. As it stands, the narrative is unfinished: it contains two gaps and comes to an abrupt end.

Hooper surmises, based on the text's internal setting, that Lewis wrote it immediately after he finished Out of the Silent Planet, in about 1939. Hooper reports that the late Gervase Mathew told him that he heard Lewis read The Dark Tower to the Inklings around that time. Anne Paxch posted on the MereLewis list that many who never attended any Inklings meetings heard Lewis read his unpublished works elsewhere, and that she recalls Gervase Mathew and others discussing passages which later appeared in The Dark Tower. The Inklings scholar John D. Rateliff suggests that the story could have been written some years later, in about 1946, pointing to a reference in a 1944 letter by Lewis's friend J. R. R. Tolkien to a story by Lewis that could be The Dark Tower. Rateliff further describes The Dark Tower and Tolkien's two unfinished time travel novels, The Lost Road, begun in 1936–37, and The Notion Club Papers, begun c. 1945, as a "triad".

Alistair Fowler had clear memories of the "Stinging Man" character in an unfinished manuscript which Lewis showed him in 1952. However, Fowler's recollections, not shared until 2003, 51 years after the event, may be imperfect. He reported seeing a manuscript of the Lewis fragment "After Ten Years" on the same occasion, a text which Roger Lancelyn Green thought Lewis did not commence until 1959. Fowler also described Lewis as engrossed in an issue of the magazine Astounding Science Fiction, which may be inaccurate given that Astounding featured what Lewis called "the fiction of Engineers", for which he "had not the slightest taste"; in the 1950s, Lewis was both a reader of and a contributor to The Magazine of Fantasy and Science Fiction.

== Authenticity and relation to the published novels ==
The Lewis scholar Kathryn Lindskoog advanced the theory that The Dark Tower and other posthumously published works attributed to Lewis were forgeries written by or at the behest of Walter Hooper, based upon her impressions of their style and questions she raised about their provenance. Lindskoog claimed that The Dark Tower resembled stories by other writers, including A Wrinkle in Time by Madeleine L'Engle (1962) and The Planet of the Dead by Clark Ashton Smith (1932).

Others accept that the story is by Lewis, as the author's estate and the publishers assert by publishing it under his name. The oppressive atmosphere of the book is reminiscent of Lewis's own That Hideous Strength (1945) and David Lindsay's A Voyage to Arcturus (1920), which Lewis acknowledged as an influence.

The Dark Tower does differ to a degree from the published novels of Lewis's The Space Trilogy in setting and subject matter. For example, Ransom becomes a marginal character, and the action takes place partly in an alternate universe. However, if, as Hooper supposes, the text was written prior to Perelandra and That Hideous Strength, it would have had no need to maintain consistency with an as yet unwritten series, especially considering that the tone and subject matter of the published series changes markedly between its first and last books.

Margaret Wheatfield noted that "In The Dark Tower we see an alternate reality with a dark analogue of Cambridge University, where evil magic is manifest and rampant, and people are made into automatons by the sting of a magical horn. In That Hideous Strength evil magic is at work behind the scenes at an ancient English university in our familiar reality, subtly corrupting the faculty by mundane means – manipulation of academic politics, offers of tempting career advances and of lucrative real estate deals. The terrifying deviltry behind it becomes only gradually visible to the reader. At least to this reviewer, it seems entirely plausible to consider the one as an early draft of the other".

Alastair Fowler, Regius Professor Emeritus of Rhetoric and English Literature at the University of Edinburgh, to whom Lewis served as a doctoral supervisor, wrote in 2003 that he saw portions of The Dark Tower including the Stinging Man and discussed them with Lewis in 1952.

Two quantitative stylometric analyses have compared The Dark Tower to other books in the Lewis space trilogy. Both analyses have supported the perception that, for whatever reason, the style of The Dark Tower is atypical of that employed by Lewis in the trilogy. The first concluded from examination of a portion of The Dark Tower's text that "with respect to the frequency of single letters and particularly letter pairs, The Dark Tower fragment represents a different style than the books comprising Lewis's deep space trilogy." The second concluded that "vocabulary usage in The Dark Tower differs from that predicted by Out of the Silent Planet and Perelandra."

== Suggested developments ==
Walter Hooper noted, in his afterword, that Scudamour's fiancée is once given the surname Ammeret, and suggests a basis in the characters Sir Scudamour and Amoret in The Faerie Queene, Book III. Amoret was carried off by an enchanter and had to be rescued. Another allusion to note is the probable reference of Orfieu to Sir Orfeo, a medieval narrative poem merging the Orpheus myth with the trip to fairyland.

The construction of the tower is clearly important. Lewis's time-lines are quite coherent in terms of the science fiction of his generation; it is often forgotten by readers that he was seriously interested in science fiction long before it was fashionable. In terms of the law that "Any two time-lines approximate to the exact degree to which their material contents are alike" the tower is obviously a repeat, on a grand scale, of the Othertimers' successful but small experiment with a railway shed constructed in the same space as ours. However, although Lewis was a reader of all sorts of science fiction, he himself was not interested in writing the technical side: he wrote in 1955 that "The most superficial appearance of plausibility – the merest sop to our critical intellect – will do. … I took a hero to Mars once in a space-ship, but when I knew better I had angels convey him to Venus".

How Lewis would have explored the threat from the Othertime world remains unknown. The text mentions an "idol" whose face is, in some way, recognizable to the Cambridge observers, and which is, the narrator says, "still there" at the end of the events to be narrated. How Lewis intended to follow up this foreshadowing is unclear; he may have intended to suggest links to contemporary world events, or may have had no precise idea in mind. The story could be interpreted as the germ of a dystopian novel like That Hideous Strength: the Stingingmen and Jerkies could parallel the Conditioners and the Conditioned as described in The Abolition of Man. The idol with many bodies and one head may express Lewis' horror, expressed in many of his works, at the absorption and suppression of the individual into a collective controlled by a single will: in Perelandra, referring to a similar loss of individuality, he speculates that "what the Pantheists falsely hoped for in Heaven, the wicked really receive in Hell".

== See also ==
- J. R. R. Tolkien's explorations of time travel
