= Professor Weston =

Character created by C. S. Lewis

Professor Weston (full name Edward Rolles Weston) is a Satanic character in C. S. Lewis's The Space Trilogy. He is introduced in the trilogy's first book, Out of the Silent Planet (1938), as an eminent physicist who has invented space travel. He is defeated by the novel's protagonist Elwin Ransom on Mars (known to its inhabitants as "Malacandra"). Weston returns in the second book, in an attempt to wreak havoc on Venus (Perelandra), the "new Eden".

== Imperialism on Malacandra ==
In Out of the Silent Planet, Weston first appears with his accomplice, Dick Devine (the future Lord Feverstone in That Hideous Strength), attempting to abduct a mentally impaired young man named Harry, whom Weston considers subhuman and disposable. They plan to take him to Malacandra (Mars) as a human sacrifice to Oyarsa, its ruling angel. It is then that they are surprised by a chance visit by Elwin Ransom, the main character of the novel, who is an old schoolmate of Devine. Ransom grows suspicious of their activities, and Devine persuades Weston to abduct Ransom instead.

Shortly after landing on Malacandra, Weston and Devine attempt to drag Ransom to the servants of Oyarsa, but Ransom escapes. In the course of his adventures on Malacandra, Ransom learns that the Oyarsa, the being to whom he was supposedly to be sacrificed, wanted only to speak with a human to learn of the conditions on Earth, the 'Silent Planet'. The "civilized' Weston cannot understand this, expecting only savagery from "primitive" cultures.

It is eventually revealed that the immediate purpose of Weston's and Devine's journey to Malacandra is to mine Malacandra's abundant gold. This is the only motive of the mercenary Devine, but Weston's plan is to open a new age of space colonization to ensure the long-term survival of the human race, an idea borrowed from Stapledon's Last and First Men. The seeming humanitarianism of Weston's scheme is corrupted by his contemptuous and colonialist attitude towards all other forms of life, including the humane and intelligent Malacandrans.

== Colonising Eden, in the name of Universal Spirit ==
In Perelandra, the sudden arrival of Weston's spaceship on Venus is a great surprise to the self-doubting Ransom, who himself has been sent by an oyarsa to counter a mysterious threat. Weston has undergone a philosophical conversion since his near-death in returning from Mars: he considers his former devotion to the human race as "a mere prejudice", and now wishes to spread "Spirit ... the blind, inarticulate purposiveness" which drives emergent evolution. In his personal theology, Weston has come to the fatal misunderstanding that God and the Devil are one, and that his great work is guided by this syncretic Spirit. Indeed, Weston calls Ransom to join him, since "nothing now divides you and me except a few outworn theological technicalities with which organised religion has unhappily allowed itself to get incrusted. But I have penetrated that crust."

But under Ransom's probing, Weston's new philosophy proves as self-aggrandizing as the old: "In so far as I am the conductor of the central forward pressure of the universe, I am it ... I, Weston, am your God and Devil. I call that Force into me completely ...." As he opens his soul, Weston is possessed by the Devil and lost as an independent personality, his frozen features suggesting that "either he was in no pain or in a pain beyond all human comprehension." Ransom leaves to look for the Lady of Perelandra, and when he returns Weston is gone.

== Death ==
When Ransom finds him again, surrounded by ripped-apart frogs, Weston is no longer human:

He did not look like a sick man: but he looked very like a dead one.The face which he raised from torturing the frog had that terrible power which the face of a corpse sometimes has of simply rebuffing every conceivable human attitude one can adopt towards it.... It looked at Ransom in silence and at last began to smile... The smile was not bitter, nor raging, nor, in an ordinary sense, sinister; it was not even mocking. It seemed to summon Ransom, with a horrible naïveté of welcome, into the world of its own pleasures, as if all men were at one in those pleasures, as if they were the most natural thing in the world and no dispute could ever have occurred about them. It was not furtive, nor ashamed, it had nothing of the conspirator in it. It did not defy goodness, it ignored it to the point of annihilation. Ransom perceived that he had never before seen anything but half-hearted and uneasy attempts at evil. This creature was whole-hearted. The extremity of its evil had passed beyond all struggle into some state which bore a horrible similarity to innocence.

The evil spirit possessing Weston works to corrupt the newly created race, subtly tempting the Lady of Perelandra (the new Eve) into disobeying the commands of Maleldil (God), while Ransom pleads with her to resist the Un-man (Ransom's name for the possessed Weston). Eventually Ransom, realizing that he cannot defeat the Un-man with argument — and prompted by Maleldil — physically attacks the Un-man, and both are badly wounded in the ensuing fight, but neither can prevail. In an interlude, Weston's consciousness appears to resurface, dismaying Ransom with the confused horror of Hell:

[Death] is the real universe.... That’s what it all means.... That’s why it’s so important to live as long as you can. All the good things are now—a thin little rind of what we call life, put on for show, and then—the real universe for ever and ever. To thicken the rind by one centimetre—to live one week, one day, one half-hour longer—that’s the only thing that matters.... Picture the universe as an infinite globe with this very thin crust on the outside.... We are born on the surface of it and all our lives we are sinking through it. When we’ve got all the way through then we are what’s called Dead: we’ve got into the dark part inside, the real globe. If your God exists, He’s not in the globe ... from His point of view, we move away, into what He regards as nonentity, where He never follows. That is all there is to us, all there ever was.... Reasoning itself is only valid as long as you stay in the rind. It has nothing to do with the real universe.... You try to connect things and can't. They take your head off...and you can't even look back on what life was like...because you know it never did mean anything even from the beginning.

However, it is impossible to distinguish whether anything he says is Weston or the Devil working through him. Indeed, Ransom concludes:

‘…it made little difference. There was, no doubt, a confusion of persons in damnation: what Pantheists falsely hoped of Heaven, bad men really received in Hell. They were melted down into their Master, as a lead soldier slips down and loses his shape in the ladle held over the gas ring. The question whether Satan, or one whom Satan has digested, is acting on any given occasion, has in the long run no clear significance.’

Ransom finally kills Weston in the tunnels beneath Perelandra and rolls his body into a volcanic abyss.

Ransom, having carved a monument to the great physicist into the wall outside the caverns, makes his way up to a mountaintop, to meet the grateful Lady and the King of the new planet.

== Lifespan ==
According to Ransom's epitaph, Weston lived from 1896 to 1942 (Perelandra, chapter 15). However, the notion that he died at the age of 46 conflicts with Weston's explanation in Chapter 7 that he had neglected the study of biology "until I reached the fifties".

== Possible influences ==
Weston may be a caricature of Cecil John Rhodes (1853-1902) an English South African businessman and imperialist politician. Like Rhodes, Weston, while supremely capable, is racist, amoral, and rapacious, and hates God and religion. In a passing comment in That Hideous Strength, it is said that Great Britain has produced both heroes and villains, that for every King Arthur, there is a traitor Mordred, for every Sydney (the Renaissance poet), there is a Cecil Rhodes. In "Perelandra", Weston mentions his liking of the book of which Rhodes said "it made me who I am”: Winwood Reade's The Martyrdom of Man, which expounded the ideology of secular humanism. Professor Weston may also stand for the scientific elitism that despises all other types of knowledge.

There is a glancing allusion to George Bernard Shaw: Weston's speech on Malacandra, like Back to Methuselah, ends with the words "It is enough for me that there is a Beyond", and Weston shares Shaw's (and Henri Bergson's) belief in the Life Force. Another possible influence is that of Nietzsche, the goal of whose philosophy was the advent of the overman, beyond good and evil. He may also be based on influential eugenicist J. B. S. Haldane.

Weston is said by Bob Rickard to be similar to the fallen wizard Saruman from J.R.R. Tolkien’s The Lord of the Rings, although he precedes The Lord of the Rings.

The choice of the name "Weston" might be more than accidental, considering that in his speech in Out of the Silent Planet he presents himself very much as the proponent of "Western Civilization" in its most expansionist and aggressive mode. (The names of the main villains in That Hideous Strength, "Wither" and "Frost", are clearly meant to reflect their characters.)

The manner of Weston's death (Ransom crushes his skull with a rock before casting his body into the fire), is an allusion to Genesis 3:15 ('he will crush your head, and you will strike his heel'). The allusion is made explicit by Ransom coming out of the fatal struggle with a perpetually bleeding wound on his heel.
