= The Space Trilogy =

1938–1945 series of three science fiction novels by C. S. Lewis

- Out of the Silent Planet (1938); Perelandra (1943); That Hideous Strength (1945)
- Author: C. S. Lewis
- Cover artist: Brian Froud (omnibus)
- Country: United Kingdom
- Language: English
- Genre: Science fiction
- Publisher: The Bodley Head (first and first omnibus)
- Published: 1938–1945; 1990 (first omnibus)
- Media type: Print (hardcover and paperback); 0-370-31439-5 (omnibus, 651 pp)

The Space Trilogy (also known as The Cosmic Trilogy, The Ransom Trilogy, or The Ransom Cycle) is a series of science fiction novels by British writer C. S. Lewis. The trilogy consists of Out of the Silent Planet (1938), Perelandra (1943), and That Hideous Strength (1945). A philologist named Elwin Ransom is the protagonist of the first two novels and an important character in the third.

== Contents ==
=== Summary ===
The books in the trilogy are:

- Out of the Silent Planet (1938), set mostly on Mars (Malacandra). In this book, Dr. Elwin Ransom is kidnapped and transported to Mars. While there, he meets the planet's various inhabitants and discovers that Earth (Thulcandra, meaning the "Silent Planet") is exiled from the rest of the Solar System.
- Perelandra (1943). Also known as Voyage to Venus. Here, Dr. Ransom journeys to an unspoiled Venus (Perelandra), where he participates in a good vs. evil battle.
- That Hideous Strength (1945), set on Earth. A scientific think tank called the N.I.C.E. (The National Institute of Co-ordinated Experiments) is secretly in touch with demonic entities who plan to assume control of the Earth.

In 1958, the publishing house Avon published an abridged edition of That Hideous Strength titled The Tortured Planet.

=== Publication history ===
- Lewis, C.S. Out of the Silent Planet. London : The Bodley Head, 1938.
- Lewis, C.S. Perelandra: A Novel. London : The Bodley Head, 1943.
- Lewis, C.S. That Hideous Strength: A Modern Fairy-Tale for Grown-ups. London : The Bodley Head, 1945.

== Influences and approach ==
Lewis stated in a letter to Roger Lancelyn Green:

What immediately spurred me to write was Olaf Stapledon's Last and First Men … and an essay in J.B.S. Haldane's Possible Worlds both of wh[ich] seemed to take the idea of such [space] travel seriously and to have the desperately immoral outlook wh[ich] I try to pillory in Weston. I like the whole interplanetary ideas as a mythology and simply wished to conquer for my own (Christian) p[oin]t of view what has always hitherto been used by the opposite side. I think H. G. Wells's First Men in the Moon the best of the sort I have read …

The other main literary influence was David Lindsay's A Voyage to Arcturus (1920): "The real father of my planet books is David Lindsay’s A Voyage to Arcturus, which you also will revel in if you don’t know it. I had grown up on Wells's stories of that kind: it was Lindsay who first gave me the idea that the ‘scientifiction’ appeal could be combined with the ‘supernatural’ appeal."

The books are not especially concerned with technological speculation, and in many ways read like fantasy adventures combined with themes of biblical history and classical mythology. Many of the names in the trilogy reflect the influence of Lewis's friend J.R.R. Tolkien's Elvish languages.

== Main character ==
The character of Elwin Ransom appears similar to Lewis himself: A university professor, an expert in languages and medieval literature, unmarried (Lewis did not marry until his fifties), wounded in World War I, and with no living relatives except for one sibling. Lewis, however, apparently intended for Ransom to be partially patterned after his friend and fellow Oxford professor J. R. R. Tolkien, since Lewis is presented as novelizing Ransom's reminiscences in the epilogue of Out of the Silent Planet and is a character-narrator in the frame tale for Perelandra. In That Hideous Strength, Ransom – with his royal charisma and casual acceptance of the supernatural – appears more like Charles Williams, or some of the heroes in Williams' books.

In Out of the Silent Planet it is suggested that "Ransom" is not the character's real name but merely an alias for a respectable professor whose reputation might suffer from his recounting such a journey to the planet Mars. In the following books, however, this is unaccountably dropped and it is made clear that Ransom is the character's true name. As befits a philologist, he provides an etymology: The name is a contraction of the Old English for "Ranolf's Son". This may be another allusion to Tolkien, a professor of Old English. However, the name "Ransom" holds a deeper meaning. In Perelandra, the voice of Maleldil (Jesus) tells Ransom, "'It is not for nothing that you are named Ransom'", and later adds, "'My name also is Ransom'".

=== The Dark Tower ===
An unfinished manuscript, published posthumously in 1977 and named The Dark Tower by Walter Hooper, its editor, features Elwin Ransom in a less central role as involved with an experiment that allows its participants to view on a special screen their own location in a parallel universe. Its authenticity was impeached by Lewis scholar Kathryn Lindskoog in her criticism of Walter Hooper, but in 2003 Alastair Fowler established its authenticity when he wrote in the Yale Review that he saw Lewis writing the manuscript that would be subsequently published as The Dark Tower, heard him reading it and discussed it with him; he further stated that he gained the impression that the piece was an abandoned first attempt to write a sequel to Out of the Silent Planet.

== Setting ==
=== Cosmology ===
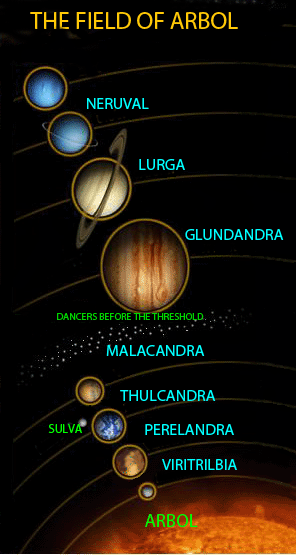
The Solar System ("Field of Arbol") with Old Solar names used in the trilogy

Ransom gets much information on cosmology from the Oyarsa (presiding angel) of Malacandra, or Mars. Maleldil, the son of the Old One, ruled the Field of Arbol (the Solar System). But then the Bent One (the Oyarsa of Earth, or Satan) rebelled against Maleldil and all the eldila (much as Morgoth rebelled against Eru and the other Valar in Tolkien's Silmarillion) of Deep Heaven (outer space). The Bent One was frustrated by Maleldil decreeing that, once humans have been created, the Oyarsa of Earth would have to cede control of the planet to them - a concession not demanded of his colleague of Mars/Malacandra, who was left to rule over the planet's intelligent beings. The Bent One first tried to seduce the Martians, who then had the technology to build spaceships, to colonize Earth and live there as his subjects. This plan - directly contradicting Maleldil's plans for Earth - was foiled by the other Oyéresu. Thereupon, the Bent One attacked Mars and inflicted vast damage there, causing the complete extinction of its winged creatures (who might have been an additional intelligent species, birds, or both - the reference is not clear). Only with enormous effort was life on Mars preserved.

This is, in effect, Lewis' version of the events known in Christian theology as The War in Heaven: "Then war broke out in heaven. Michael and his angels fought against the dragon, and the dragon and his angels fought back. But he was not strong enough, and they lost their place in heaven. The great dragon was hurled down—that ancient serpent called the devil, or Satan, who leads the whole world astray. He was hurled to the earth, and his angels with him" [Revelation 12:7–10 (NIV)].

In response to his destructive acts, the Bent One suffered confinement on Earth, where he inflicted great evil. He made Earth a silent planet, cut off from the Oyéresu of other planets; thus, Earth is referred to by the name 'Thulcandra', the Silent Planet. The Bent One seduced Adam and Eve and caused the Original Sin in order to make humans unworthy of getting custody of the planet, as Maleldil intended. He then continues to tempt humans into evil, so as to continue their unworthiness. However, he hates the humans, whose advent was forced upon him by Maleldil, and he mistreats and tortures also the humans who submitted to him - as seen in his treatment of Professor Weston in Perelandra and of the N.I.C.E. directors in the end of That Hideous Strength. Maleldil incarnated as a man on Thulcandra to save the human race. According to the Green Lady, Tinidril (Mother of Perelandra, or Venus), Thulcandra is favoured among all the worlds because Maleldil came to it to become a man.

Earth will remain a silent planet until the end of the great Siege of Deep Heaven against the Oyarsa of Earth. The siege starts to end (with the Oyéresu of other worlds descending to Earth) at the finale of the trilogy, That Hideous Strength. But there is still much to happen until the Oyéresu put an end to the rule of the Bent Eldil and, on the way, smash the Moon to fragments.

In the Field of Arbol, the outer planets are older than the inner planets. Asteroids are called "dancers before the threshold of the Great Worlds".

=== Eldila ===
The eldila (singular eldil) are super-human spirits. The human characters in the trilogy encounter them on various planets, but the eldila themselves are native to interplanetary and interstellar space ("Deep Heaven"). They can, if they want, remain fixed to one point on a planet's surface - but that requires a conscious act on their part, without which they would instantly drift away into space.

Certain very powerful eldila, the Oyéresu (singular Oyarsa), control the course of nature on each of the planets of the Solar System. They can manifest in corporeal forms. The title Oyarsa seems to indicate the function of leadership, regardless of the leader's species; when the Perelandran human Tor assumes rule of his world, he styles himself "Tor-Oyarsa-Perelendri" (presumably "Tor, Ruler of Perelandra").

The eldila are science-fictionalised depictions of angels, immortal and holy. (As Lewis implies in Chapter 22 of Out of the Silent Planet, the name Oyarsa was suggested by Oyarses, the name given in Bernard Silvestris's Cosmographia to the governors of the celestial spheres. Bernard's word was almost certainly a corruption—or a deliberate alteration—of Greek οὐσιάρχης [ousiarches, "lords of being"], used with the same meaning in the Hermetic Asclepius.) The eldila resident on Earth are "dark eldila"; in other words, fallen angels or demons. The Oyarsa of Earth, the "Bent One", is Satan. During the trilogy, Ransom meets the Oyéresu of both Mars and Venus, who are described as being masculine (but not actually male) and feminine (but not actually female), respectively. The Oyéresu of other worlds have characteristics like those of the corresponding classical gods; for instance, the Oyarsa of Jupiter gives a feeling of merriment (joviality). It is made clear that they are identical with the gods and goddesses of the Greco-Roman pantheon, but that the Greeks and Romans were wrong to worship them as gods—in fact, they are angels, faithful servants of the one and only true God, Maleldil. As noted by Lewis in the non-fiction book The Discarded Image, the identification of the Greco-Roman gods as angels can be traced to late medieval and Renaissance times, when European intellectuals rediscovered and highly valued works of classical antiquity where references to these gods abound, and this needed to be reconciled with these intellectuals' Christian faith.

=== Hnau ===
Hnau is a word in the Old Solar language which refers to "rational animals" such as humans. In the book, the Old Solar speaker specifies that God is not hnau, and is unsure whether eldila can be termed "hnau", deciding that if they are hnau, they are a different kind of hnau than humans or Martians.

The term was adopted by some others, including Lewis's friend J. R. R. Tolkien; Tolkien used the term in The Notion Club Papers, which were not published in his lifetime. Tolkien distinguished hnau from beings of pure spirit or spirits able to assume a body (which is not essential to their nature). Similarly, a character in James Blish's science fiction novel A Case of Conscience wonders whether a particular alien is a hnau, which he defines as having "a rational soul".

The term has been used by philosopher Thomas I. White in "Is a Dolphin a Person?" White asks if dolphins are persons, and if they are, whether they can also be reckoned as hnau.

=== Old Solar language ===
According to the Space Trilogy's cosmology, the language of all the inhabitants of the Field of Arbol is Old Solar, or Hlab-Eribol-ef-Cordi. Only Earth lost the language; this loss was due to the Bent One's influence. Old Solar can be likened to the Elvish languages invented by Lewis's friend, Tolkien. The grammar is little known, except for the plurals of nouns. The plurals of some words (hross, eldil) are simple, only adding a final -a or -i; others (as for Oyarsa, sorn, hnakra), are quite complex broken plurals, adding an internal -é-, and adding or altering a final vowel (usually to -i or -u), and may also include internal metathesis (Oyéresu, séroni, hnéraki). Old Solar is also referred to as "the Great Tongue":

For this was the language spoken before the Fall and beyond the Moon and the meanings were not given to the syllables by chance, or skill, or long tradition, but truly inherent in them as the shape of the great Sun is inherent in the little waterdrop. This was Language herself, as she first sprang at Maleldil's bidding out of the molten quicksilver of the first star called Mercury on Earth, but Viritrilbia in Deep Heaven.

==== Terms used throughout the trilogy ====
- Eldil (pl. Eldila): An everlasting, rational, "multidimensional energy being" that is not organic; an angel. Some act in the capacity of "Oyarsa" of a planet.
- Field of Arbol: The Solar System.
- Glund or Glundandra: Jupiter.
- Hnau or 'nau: A rational being, capable of speech, intellect, and personhood, and containing a soul.
- Handra: A planet or land.
- Hrū: Blood.
- Lurga: Saturn.
- Malacandra: Mars.
- Maleldil: The Christian God, described in Perelandra as having been incarnated as Jesus.
- Oyarsa (pl. Oyéresu) (title): Ruler of a planet. A higher-order angel.
- Perelandra: Venus.
- Sulva: The Moon.
- Thulcandra: Earth, literally "The Silent Planet".
- Viritrilbia: Mercury.

== Parallels and adaptations ==
The cosmology of all three books—in which the Oyéresu of Mars and Venus somewhat resemble the corresponding gods from classical mythology—derives from Lewis's interest in medieval beliefs. Lewis discusses these ideas in his book The Discarded Image, which was published much later than the Space Trilogy. Lewis was intrigued with the ways medieval authors borrowed concepts from pre-Christian religion and science and attempted to reconcile them with Christianity, and with the lack of a clear distinction between natural and supernatural phenomena in medieval thought. The Space Trilogy also plays on themes in Lewis's essay "Religion and Rocketry", which argues that as long as humanity remains flawed and sinful, our exploration of other planets will tend to do them more harm than good. Furthermore, much of the substance of the argument between Ransom and Weston in Perelandra is found in Lewis's book Miracles. Links between Lewis's Space Trilogy and his other writings are discussed at great length in Michael Ward's Planet Narnia and in Kathryn Lindskoog's C.S. Lewis: Mere Christian.

In That Hideous Strength, Lewis alludes several times to Tolkien's Atlantean civilization Numinor (spelt Númenor by Tolkien), saying in the foreword, "Those who would like to learn further about Numinor and the True West must (alas!) await the publication of much that still exists only in the MSS. of my friend, Professor J. R. R. Tolkien."
