= Of Other Worlds =

Anthology of literary criticism by C.S. Lewis

- First edition
- Author: C. S. Lewis
- Genre: Literary Criticism
- Publication date: 1966

Of Other Worlds is a 1966 anthology of literary criticism by C. S. Lewis and published posthumously by the executors of his estate. It was edited by Lewis' secretary and eventual literary executor Walter Hooper. The first part of the anthology consists of several essays that cover Lewis' ideas about the creation of science fiction or fantasy literature. Unreal Estates is the transcript of a recorded conversation between Lewis and the authors Brian Aldiss and Kingsley Amis that took place in Lewis' rooms in Magdalene College "a short while before illness forced him to retire." The second part of the book is made up of three of Lewis' science fiction stories (one of which was previously unpublished) and the beginnings of After Ten Years, an unfinished novel set during the aftermath of the Trojan War.
