= The Haunted Woman =

Fantasy novel by David Lindsay

- Cover of first edition
- Author: David Lindsay
- Language: English
- Genre: Fantasy novel
- Publisher: Methuen & Co. Ltd.
- Publication date: 1922
- Publication place: United Kingdom
- Media type: Print (Hardback)
- Pages: 197 pp.

The Haunted Woman is a metaphysical dark fantasy novel by British writer David Lindsay. It was first published, somewhat cut, as a serial in The Daily News in 1921. It was first published in book form by Methuen & Co. Ltd., London, in 1922. The work supposedly marked Lindsay's attempt to write a more "commercial" novel after the initial failure of his first work, A Voyage to Arcturus (1920), though he began it before that work was published. It was reissued by Gollancz in 1947. It was republished by the Newcastle Publishing Company as the fourth volume of the Newcastle Forgotten Fantasy Library in March, 1975; the Newcastle edition was the first American edition. Later editions were issued by Borgo Press (1980), Canongate Books (1987), Wildside Press (2003), and Tartarus Press (2004).

== Plot summary ==
Isabel Loment, engaged to the ordinary and unexceptional Marshall Stokes, leads a peripatetic existence as the ward of her aunt, Ann Moor. Their travels take them to the downlands of Sussex, to Runhill Court, an ancient home owned by Henry Judge. There Isabel discovers a strange staircase few can see, which leads upwards to three doors. She chooses one, which opens onto a room that appears to exist only part of the time; what might lie behind the other doors remains a mystery. In the room she reencounters Judge. There they find new insights and are able to express themselves in new ways, but are unable to recall what has transpired there when they leave. They develop a disturbing parallel relationship in the mysterious room, which ultimately culminates in the death of Judge and the rupture of Isabel from Marshall.

== Themes ==
The novel examines themes of sexual desire vs. rational control. While inside the mysterious wing of the house, Judge and Isabel begin to develop romantic feelings for each other; yet since they cannot remember anything which happened in the rooms after they leave the rooms, their burgeoning romance only exists in the magical portion of the house.
