= That Hideous Strength =

1945 science-fiction novel by C. S. Lewis

- First edition cover
- Author: C. S. Lewis
- Language: English
- Series: Space Trilogy
- Genre: Science fiction novel, dystopia
- Publisher: The Bodley Head
- Publication date: 1945
- Publication place: United Kingdom
- Media type: Print (hardback and paperback)
- Pages: 384 pp
- Preceded by: Perelandra

That Hideous Strength: A Modern Fairy-Tale for Grown-Ups (also released under the title The Tortured Planet in an abridged format) is a 1945 novel by C. S. Lewis, the final book in Lewis's theological science fiction Space Trilogy. The events of this novel follow those of Out of the Silent Planet and Perelandra (also titled Voyage to Venus) and once again feature the philologist Elwin Ransom. Yet unlike the principal events of those two novels, the story takes place on Earth rather than elsewhere in the Solar System. The story involves an ostensibly scientific institute, the National Institute for Co-ordinated Experiments (N.I.C.E.), which is a front for sinister supernatural forces.

The novel was heavily influenced by the writing of Lewis's friend and fellow Inkling Charles Williams, and is markedly dystopian in style. In the foreword, Lewis states that the novel's point is the same as that of his 1943 non-fiction work The Abolition of Man, which argues that there are natural laws and objective values that education should teach children to recognise.

The novel's title is taken from a poem written by David Lyndsay in 1555, Ane Dialog betuix Experience and ane Courteour, also known as The Monarche. The couplet in question, "The shadow of that hyddeous strength, sax myle and more it is of length", refers to the Tower of Babel.

== Plot ==
The novel, written during the final period of World War II, takes place at an undetermined year "after the end of the war".

Mark Studdock is a young academic who has just become a Senior Fellow in sociology at Bracton College in the University of Edgestow. The fellows of Bracton are debating the sale of a portion of college land to the National Institute for Co-ordinated Experiments (N.I.C.E.), whose staff already includes some college faculty. The sale is controversial since the land in question (Bragdon Wood) is an ancient woodland believed to be the resting place of Merlin. After the deal is struck, a N.I.C.E. insider named Lord Feverstone proposes a possible post for Mark at the Institute. (It is gradually revealed that Feverstone is the new title of Richard Devine, who accompanied Professor Weston on the trip to Mars in Out of the Silent Planet, but not on the trip to Venus in Perelandra.)

Mark's wife Jane (a PhD student at the university) has suffered a peculiar nightmare involving a severed head. She meets Mrs. Dimble, the wife of one of her former tutors, who is being evicted due to sale of land to the N.I.C.E. When Jane talks about her dreams, Mrs. Dimble leads her to seek counsel from a Miss Ironwood who lives in the Manor in the nearby town of St Anne's. An argument between Jane and Mark shows how their marriage is deteriorating.

Lord Feverstone introduces Mark to the N.I.C.E., where he becomes acquainted with the top brass at their headquarters at Belbury, near Edgestow. Mark can never find out what his place in the organisation is; he has no office, is given no duties for some time, and seems to be alternately in and out of favour. A scientist named Bill Hingest, who is resigning from the N.I.C.E., warns Mark to get out. That night, Hingest is mysteriously murdered.

At the same time, Jane works up the courage to visit Miss Ironwood at St Anne's. Miss Ironwood, who is dressed in black just as Jane had dreamed of her, is convinced that Jane's dreams are visions of genuine events. Later, Jane is introduced to Dr Elwin Ransom, the protagonist of the first two books in Lewis's space trilogy. He has become the Pendragon or heir of King Arthur, the ruler of the nation of Logres, which is described as the good side of Britain. More mundanely, he is the Director of the group living in the Manor at St Anne's. He is in communication with the Oyéresu (singular "Oyarsa"), angelic beings who guide the planets of the Solar System. Earth has been in quarantine: its rebellious Oyarsa (who is the Devil) and his demons could not travel beyond the orbit of the Moon, and the other Oyéresu could not come to Earth.

Mark is finally given work: to write pseudonymous newspaper articles supporting the N.I.C.E., including two for use after a riot they intend to provoke in Edgestow. The riot takes place as planned, allowing the N.I.C.E.'s private police force to take over the town. They arrest Jane, in whom the N.I.C.E. are interested (as revealed later) because of her psychic abilities, which they fear will get into their opponents' hands. The head of the N.I.C.E. police, a woman known as "Fairy" Hardcastle, starts to torture Jane but is forced to release her when rioters turn in her direction. Totally exhausted and nearly unconscious, Jane is rescued and taken to St Anne's.

Mark is once again out of favour in the N.I.C.E., but after a conversation with an Italian scientist named Filostrato he is introduced to the Head of the Institute. This turns out to be a literal head – that of a recently guillotined French scientist (as Jane dreamed) which Filostrato erroneously believes he has restored to life by his own efforts.

From Jane's dreams that people were digging up the grave of a long-buried man and that the man had left, Ransom concludes that the N.I.C.E. is looking for the body of Merlin, who truly is buried in Bragdon Wood – not dead, but rather in a timeless state. Jane will guide members of the group to the place she dreamed of.

The N.I.C.E. bosses now try to strengthen their hold over Mark by showing him trumped-up evidence that he murdered Bill Hingest. This backfires, as the crisis finally gives Mark the courage to leave Belbury. He returns to Edgestow in search of Jane only to find their apartment empty and the town under N.I.C.E. control. Later he meets Cecil Dimble, one of the St Anne's community, who despite his misgivings offers to help him. Mark deliberates too long over Dimble's proposal and he is found and arrested for Hingest's murder.

That night, during a heavy storm, both the company of St Anne's and N.I.C.E. personnel are on the trail of Merlin, who has apparently revived. He has taken the clothes of a tramp through his powers of hypnosis and acquired a wild horse. He meets the company of St Anne's but rides away. Members of the N.I.C.E. capture the tramp, believing him to be Merlin.

Mark, while contemplating his upcoming trial and execution, discovers that he has not been arrested by the real police but by officials of the N.I.C.E. who (he now guesses) are the true murderers of Hingest. To his surprise, he is told that he is to be initiated into the group's inner ring. In preparation for this he begins a bizarre training programme, led by Professor Frost, intended to cultivate absolute objectivity by relegating emotion to the status of a chemical phenomenon. He outwardly participates in these rituals (knowing that he will otherwise be killed) but inwardly begins to reject everything the N.I.C.E. stands for.

Merlin arrives at St Anne's ahead of his pursuers, where he and Ransom converse in Latin. Ransom reveals that there are Satanic forces behind the N.I.C.E. and that Merlin is to be possessed by the Oyéresu; since the forces of darkness broke the lunar barrier in the earlier books, the heavenly beings may also cross the barrier and intervene in human affairs.

Jane has two mystical experiences; the first with the Earth-bound counterpart of the Oyarsa of Venus and the second with God. After discussions with Mrs. Dimble and the Director, she becomes a Christian.

Merlin, now possessed by the Oyéresu, disguises himself as a Basque priest and answers the N.I.C.E.'s advertisement for an interpreter of ancient languages. He hypnotises and interviews the tramp (who the N.I.C.E. still believe may be the real Merlin) and the two of them are brought to a banquet. There Merlin pronounces the curse of Babel upon the assembled N.I.C.E. leaders, causing all present to speak gibberish, and also liberates the many animals on which the N.I.C.E. were experimenting. The bigger animals kill most of the N.I.C.E. staff.

As earthquakes destroy the building, Lord Feverstone flees to Edgestow but is killed when that too is engulfed. Others escape and wander to the Head, where Filostrato is sacrificed, Wither kills Straik, and Wither is killed by a bear. Meanwhile, Frost is compelled by his Satanic master to immolate himself in the Objectivity Room. Merlin helps Mark escape and sends him to St Anne's. The Oyarsa of Venus lingers at the Manor, as Ransom is now to be transported back to that planet. When Mark arrives, a vision of Venus leads him into a bridal chamber that Jane has been preparing for him.

== Setting and context ==
The novel is set in post-war England, in the fictional English town of Edgestow, in approximately 1948 according to the internal timeline of 'The Cosmic Trilogy'. The story takes place inside the University of Edgestow, within the nearby town, at the new N.I.C.E. headquarters, and at St Anne's Manor.

Elwin Ransom, introduced in the novel in Chapter 7, is the protagonist of the first two books in Lewis's space trilogy, and his point of view dominates their narrative. Lord Feverstone (formerly Dick Devine) was a villain in the first novel who, along with Professor Weston, had abducted Ransom to Mars in the mistaken belief that the Martians required a sacrifice. When Feverstone speaks in That Hideous Strength of Weston having been murdered by "the opposition", he is speaking of Ransom having killed Weston (who had become possessed by a devil) on Venus as described in Perelandra. The first two books fully explicate Lewis's mythology (based on a combination of the Bible and medieval cosmology) according to which each planet of the solar system is ruled by an angelic spirit. This mythos is re-introduced gradually in this story, whose protagonists—the Earth-bound Mark and Jane Studdock—are unaware of these realities when the story opens.

== Characters ==
- Mark Gainsby Studdock – Protagonist; sociologist, and ambitious to the point of obsession with reaching the "inner circle" of his social environment.
- Jane Tudor Studdock – Protagonist; Mark's wife. Jane is supposedly writing a PhD thesis on John Donne, but since her marriage she has become effectively a housewife. In the course of the book she discovers herself to be clairvoyant.

=== Bracton College ===
- Sub-Warden Curry – Leader of the "Progressive Element" at Bracton College, a well-organised cabal that manipulates the college into welcoming the N.I.C.E. He is in fact a very gullible and shallow sort of man, who himself is easily manipulated by the N.I.C.E.
- James Busby – A former clergyman and bursar at Bracton College and another member of the 'Progressive Element'.

=== N.I.C.E. ===
- John Wither – Long-winded bureaucrat and Deputy Director of the N.I.C.E. He is the true leader of the N.I.C.E. and a servant of the Macrobes. Long association with them has "withered" his mind, and his speech and thinking are characterised by thought-deadening vagueness and jargon.
- Professor Augustus Frost – A psychologist and assistant to Wither, he is the only other N.I.C.E initiate who knows the true nature of the Head and of the Macrobes. He is coldhearted and unemotional and he has an exact, precise manner of speech and thinking.
- Miss Hardcastle (a.k.a. "The Fairy") – The sadistic, cigar-chewing head of the N.I.C.E. Institutional Police and its female auxiliary, the "Waips". Torture is her favourite interrogation method, and she takes special, sexual pleasure in abusing female prisoners.
- Dr Filostrato – An obese Italian eunuch physiologist. His ultimate goal is to free humanity from the constraints of organic life.
- Lord Feverstone (Dick Devine) – A politician, recently ennobled businessman, and nominal academic who lures Mark into the N.I.C.E. Feverstone (with Professor Weston) kidnapped Ransom in Out of the Silent Planet and was responsible for getting Mark Studdock his fellowship at Bracton. He is an amoral political chameleon, loyal to no one, always angling to build his social position, wealth, and comfort, though capable of great energy and physical courage when necessary.
- Reverend Straik – the "Mad Parson". He believes that any sort of power is a manifestation of God's will. It is noted that "he was originally a good man" and that he was warped by grief over the death of his daughter.
- Horace Jules – A Cockney novelist, tabloid reporter, and pseudo-scientific journalist who has been appointed Director of the N.I.C.E.
- William (Bill) Hingest – A distinguished chemist who is recruited by the N.I.C.E. but soon decides to resign.

=== St Anne's ===
- Dr Elwin Ransom (also known as "the Pendragon" and "the Director") – A former Cambridge don who heads the community at St Anne's. He alone communicates with the benevolent eldila (angels), whom he met during his earlier voyages to Malacandra and Perelandra (Mars and Venus). He has changed his surname to Fisher-King and has a wound in his foot, received on Venus, that will not heal until he returns there. His heavenly experiences have made him a kingly figure among his small band of followers, and he attributes his following to a divine Power, presumably Maleldil (Jesus Christ).
- Grace Ironwood – The seemingly stern but kind psychologist and doctor who helps Jane interpret her dreams.
- Dr Cecil Dimble – Another academic, an old friend of Ransom, and close adviser on matters of Arthurian scholarship and pre-Norman Britain.
- Margaret "Mother" Dimble – The wife of Cecil Dimble and a close friend of Jane.
- Ivy Maggs – Formerly a part-time maid for Jane Studdock; now driven out of the town by the N.I.C.E. and living at St Anne's.
- Merlinus Ambrosius – The wizard Merlin, awakened and returned to serve the Pendragon and save England. Receives the powers of the Oyéresu. He has been in a deep sleep since the time of King Arthur, and both sides initially believe he will join the N.I.C.E.
- Andrew MacPhee – A scientist, sceptic and rationalist who is a close friend of Dr Ransom and joins him at St Anne's.
- Arthur Denniston – An academic at Edgestow and a former friend of Mark Studdock from student days.
- Camilla Denniston – The wife of Arthur Denniston.
- Mr Bultitude – A large brown bear.

== Themes and philosophy ==
A significant element of the book (Lewis rated it as "second in importance") is to illustrate the destructive folly of seeking power and prestige by belonging to a ruling clique or inner circle.

Somewhat like the early Gnostics, the main antagonists of That Hideous Strength despise the human body and all organic life as frail, corrupted, and unworthy of pure mind. Like modern transhumanists, they believe that humanity can be perfected by migrating out of flesh and blood. Lewis portrays the consequences of these ideas as a dystopian nightmare: by rejecting God and His creation, the N.I.C.E inevitably falls under the dominion of demons (whom they imagine to have discovered under the guise of "Macrobes"). Lewis had hinted at such themes before in The Screwtape Letters, in which the senior demon Screwtape tells his nephew that their goal is "to emotionalise and mythologise their science to such an extent that what is, in effect, a belief in [demons] (though not under that name) will creep in while the human mind remains closed to belief in [God]. [...] If once we can produce our perfect work—the Materialist Magician, the man, not using, but veritably worshipping, what he vaguely calls 'Forces' while denying the existence of 'spirits'—then the end of the war will be in sight." Lewis's attack is not on science as such, or scientific planning, but rather the kind of totalitarian planned society idealised by Nazism and Bolshevism: "the disciplined cruelty of some ideological oligarchy".

In contrast, Lewis portrays reality as supporting Christian tenets such as the inherent sinfulness of humanity, the impossibility of humans perfecting themselves apart from God, the essential goodness of the physical body (though currently corrupted by sin), the omnipotence of God against the limited powers of evil, and the existence of angels and demons. Within this Christian framework, Lewis incorporates elements of the Arthurian legend as well as Roman mythological figures. In this way, Lewis integrates Christian, Roman, and British mythological symbolism.

== Development and influences ==
Lewis started writing That Hideous Strength during World War II, finishing the first draft in 1943. During the War, Lewis taught at Oxford University and among other writing projects worked on the last two books of his "Space Trilogy"—Perelandra (1943) and That Hideous Strength.

The novel makes reference to "Numinor and the True West", which Lewis credits as a then-unpublished creation of J. R. R. Tolkien; they were friends and colleagues at Oxford University and fellow members of the Inklings. The misspelling of Númenor came from Lewis's only hearing Tolkien say the name in one of his readings.

Charles Williams's treatments of the King Arthur legends were a significant influence on the Arthurian elements of the novel. Brenton D. G. Dickieson writes, "Williams' idea of Logres emerges in That Hideous Strength, forming the speculative framework of a good-evil dialectic in the apocalyptic narrative of this last Ransom chronicle". Beyond Arthurian myth, Lewis was profoundly impacted by the theological framework presented in Williams's 1939 treatise The Descent of the Dove. The novel's spiritual dynamics heavily rely on Williams's articulation of the "Two Ways" (the Affirmation and Rejection of Images), and Lewis explicitly credited Williams's doctrines of co-inherence and substitution as a foundational inspiration for the narrative, advising readers in his preface to consult the treatise to fully grasp the book's central ideas.

In the book's preface, Lewis acknowledges science-fiction writer Olaf Stapledon and his work: "Mr. Stapledon is so rich in invention that he can well afford to lend, and I admire his invention (though not his philosophy) so much that I should feel no shame to borrow."

== Reception ==
Some two years before writing Nineteen Eighty-Four, George Orwell reviewed That Hideous Strength for the Manchester Evening News, commenting: "Plenty of people in our age do entertain the monstrous dreams of power that Mr Lewis attributes to his characters [the N.I.C.E. scientists], and we are within sight of the time when such dreams will be realizable." The review was written shortly after the nuclear bombings of Hiroshima and Nagasaki. However, Orwell argued that the book "would have been stronger without the supernatural elements". Particularly, Orwell objected to the ending in which N.I.C.E. is overthrown by divine intervention: "[Lewis] is entitled to his beliefs, but they weaken his story, not only because they offend the average reader's sense of probability but because in effect they decide the issue in advance. When one is told that God and the Devil are in conflict, one always knows which side is going to win. The whole drama of the struggle against evil lies in the fact that one does not have supernatural aid." However, Orwell still maintained that the book was "worth reading".

Leonard Bacon, reviewing That Hideous Strength, described the book as "a ghastly but in many places a magnificent nightmare". He criticised the character of Studdock as uninteresting, noting that "it is hard to get excited about the vagaries of a young, insecure and ambitious academic figure whose main concern is to get into an inner circle, any inner circle", but praised the plotting of the book: "The hunt of Ransom's remnant for the real Merlin while the villains capture the false one is as vivid as a passage in Stevenson." Although Bacon regarded the book as somewhat inferior to its two predecessors, he concluded: "This is just the sort of thing that pleases Mr. Lewis's admirers. And they are right to admire him. Win, lose or draw—and the reviewer doesn't think that this book is wholly victorious—Mr. Lewis adds energy to systems he comes in contact with."

Floyd C. Gale wrote that the book "bears the authentic stamp of its creator's awesome imagination".

J. B. S. Haldane published two essays attacking Lewis's negative views on science and progress, as he saw them; the first was entitled "Auld Hornie, F.R.S.". Lewis's response remained unpublished in his lifetime.

Alister McGrath says the novel "shows [C. S. Lewis] to have been a prophetic voice, offering a radical challenge to the accepted social wisdom of his own generation".

== Publication history ==
Lewis made minor alterations between the first British and American editions. For example, some of the Latin is corrected, and a scene where Merlin hides in the hedgerow was removed by Lewis.

- 1945 (December), UK, The Bodley Head, hardback (first edition)
- 1946, US, Macmillan Publishing Co., New York City
- 1946 Paperback edition, abridged by the author, published in the United States under the title The Tortured Planet by Macmillan and under its original title in Britain by PAN books
- 1996, US, Scribner Classics
- 1996 (1 June), US, Simon & Schuster, paperback, ISBN 0-684-82385-3
- 1996 (28 October), US, Simon & Schuster, hardback, ISBN 0-684-83367-0
- 2012 (April), US, HarperCollins, e-book, ISBN 9780062196941
