= Walter Hooper =

American literary editor (1931–2020)

- Born: March 27, 1931; Reidsville, North Carolina, United States
- Died: December 7, 2020 (aged 89); England
- Resting place: Wolvercote Cemetery, Oxford, England
- Education: University of North Carolina; St Stephen's House, Oxford
- Occupations: Writer; literary editor
- Employer(s): University of Kentucky; Wadham College, Oxford; Jesus College, Oxford
- Writing career
- Language: English
- Notable works: C.S. Lewis: A Biography (with Roger Lancelyn Green) (1974); C.S. Lewis: A Complete Guide to His Life and Works (1998)

Walter McGehee Hooper (March 27, 1931 – December 7, 2020) was an American writer. He is best known as the editor of many posthumous books by C. S. Lewis, as the joint author of a biography of Lewis and as the literary advisor of Lewis's estate. He was also a literary trustee for Lewis's friend Owen Barfield from December 1997 until October 2006.

== Life ==
Hooper was born on March 27, 1931, in Reidsville, North Carolina, United States, the third of the five children of Archie Hooper, a plumber, and Madge Hooper, who managed a school canteen. He also had one older half-brother, the first son of Archie Hooper through a previous marriage. He studied education at the University of North Carolina, graduating as an MA in 1958. He taught English literature at the University of Kentucky for a short period in the early 1960s.

Hooper was introduced to C. S. Lewis by a preface to a translation of the New Testament epistles that he came across while a student. Reading Lewis's Miracles during a subsequent spell of military service prompted him to write a fan letter, which led to their becoming pen friends. In the summer of 1963, Hooper visited Oxford and met Lewis for tea at his cottage, The Kilns. Severely debilitated by osteoporosis and kidney failure, Lewis offered Hooper a job as his correspondence secretary, and Hooper spent the next few months typing out the letters that Lewis dictated in reply to the enormous volume of mail that he received from readers around the world. After Lewis's death on November 22 of that year, Hooper made his home in Oxford and devoted himself to caring for Lewis's alcoholic brother, Warren Lewis, and to doing everything that he could to honour Lewis's memory. After writing a biography of Lewis with Lewis's friend and former pupil Roger Lancelyn Green, he spent some five decades collecting and editing Lewis's juvenilia, poems, short stories, academic papers, journalism, diaries and letters. He also took up the burden of answering letters sent to Lewis by child readers of The Chronicles of Narnia who were unaware that Lewis had died.

In addition to his literary work, Hooper also had a religious vocation: he studied for the Anglican ministry at St Stephen's House, Oxford and was ordained as a deacon in 1964 and as a priest in 1965. He was the Chaplain of Wadham College, Oxford from 1965 to 1967 and the Assistant Chaplain of Jesus College, Oxford from 1967 to 1970. He converted to the Catholic Church in 1988, and was a daily communicant at the Oxford Oratory. Remembering meeting Pope John Paul II in 1984, while he was still an Anglican, he said: "When the pope walked into the room it was as if Aslan himself had arrived."

At age 89, Hooper died from complications of COVID-19 on December 7, 2020, amidst the COVID-19 pandemic in England. He is buried in Wolvercote Cemetery, Oxford.

== Literary work ==
Hooper's works include:

- C.S. Lewis: A Biography co-authored with Roger Lancelyn Green (1974)
- Study guide to The Screwtape Letters with Owen Barfield (1976)
- Past Watchful Dragons: The Narnian Chronicles of C.S. Lewis (1979)
- With Anthony Marchington Through Joy and Beyond: The Life of C.S. Lewis (1979)
- The Chronicles of Narnia Soundbook (The Lion, the Witch and the Wardrobe; Prince Caspian; The Voyage of the Dawn Treader; The Silver Chair) (abridged) with program booklet by Walter Hooper (1980)
- Through Joy and Beyond: A Pictorial Biography of C.S. Lewis (1982)
- C.S. Lewis: A Companion and Guide (1996)
- C.S. Lewis: A Complete Guide to His Life and Works (1998)

In addition, Hooper edited or wrote introductions for some thirty collections of Lewis's writings. Several of these books contain works by Lewis previously unpublished.

The following works were edited by Hooper:

- All My Road Before Me: The Diary of C.S. Lewis, 1922–27. San Diego: Harcourt, 1991.
- Boxen: The Imaginary World of the Young C.S. Lewis. New York: Harcourt, 1985.
- Christian Reflections. Grand Rapids: Eerdmans, 1967.
- C.S. Lewis: Collected Letters, Volume 1: Family Letters (1905–1931). London: HarperCollins, 2000.
- C.S. Lewis: Collected Letters, Volume 2: Books, Broadcasts and War (1931–1949). London: HarperCollins, 2004.
- C.S. Lewis: Collected Letters, Volume 3: Narnia, Cambridge and Joy (1950–1963). London: HarperCollins, 2006.
- C.S. Lewis: Readings for Meditation and Reflection. San Francisco: Harper, 1992.
- God in the Dock: Essays on Theology and Ethics. Grand Rapids: Eerdmans, 1970.
- Image and Imagination. Cambridge: Cambridge University Press, 2013.
- Narrative Poems. Edited with preface by Walter Hooper. New York: Harcourt Brace Jovanovich, 1969.
- Of Other Worlds: Essays and Stories. Edited with preface by Walter Hooper. New York: Harcourt, Brace & World, 1966.
- Of This & Other Worlds. Edited with preface by Walter Hooper. London: Collins, 1982.
- On Stories, and Other Essays on Literature. Edited with preface by Walter Hooper. New York: Harcourt Brace Jovanovich, 1982.
- Poems. New York: Harcourt Brace Jovanovich, 1964.
- Present Concerns. San Diego: Harcourt Brace Jovanovich, 1986.
- Selected Literary Essays. London: Cambridge University Press, 1969.
- Spirits in Bondage: A Cycle of Lyrics. Edited with a preface by Walter Hooper. New York: Harcourt Brace Jovanovich, 1984.
- Studies in Medieval and Renaissance Literature. Collected by Walter Hooper. New York: Harcourt, Brace & World, 1966.
- The Business of Heaven: Daily Readings from C.S. Lewis. San Diego: Harcourt, 1984.
- The Collected Poems of C.S. Lewis. London: Fount, 1994.
- The Dark Tower & Other Stories. New York: Harcourt Brace Jovanovich, 1977.
- The Weight of Glory and Other Addresses (revised and expanded). Edited with introduction by Walter Hooper. New York: Macmillan, 1980.
- They Stand Together: The Letters of C.S. Lewis to Arthur Greeves (1914–1963). New York: Macmillan, 1979.
- Letters of C.S. Lewis. Edited with a memoir by W.H. Lewis. Revised and enlarged by Walter Hooper. New York: Harcourt Brace, 1988.

=== Honours ===
In 1972 Hooper was awarded the Mythopoeic Society's second annual Mythopoeic Scholarship Award in Inklings Studies, for scholarly contribution to the criticism and appreciation of the epic fantasy literature generated by the Inklings School.

=== Controversy ===
In 1977, Hooper published C. S. Lewis's unfinished science fiction novel The Dark Tower, an abandoned sequel to his interplanetary trilogy. Kathryn Lindskoog, the American author of a study of Lewis, wrote a book alleging that the novel was either partly or entirely forged by Hooper and also questioning the authenticity of other Lewis works that Hooper had edited. Hooper rejected Lindskoog's accusations, and her assault on his integrity is now generally acknowledged to be baseless. In particular, Professor Alastair Fowler of the University of Edinburgh, whose doctoral research Lewis supervised in 1952, recalled The Dark Tower as a story that Lewis had discussed with him. Lewis's stepson Douglas Gresham has also rejected Lindskoog's claims: "The whole controversy thing was engineered for very personal reasons…. Her fanciful theories have been pretty thoroughly discredited."

== Related works ==
- Diana Pavlac Glyer The Company They Keep: C. S. Lewis and J. R. R. Tolkien as Writers in Community. Kent State University Press. Kent Ohio. 2007. ISBN 978-0-87338-890-0
