= E. H. Visiak =

English writer

Edward Harold Physick (20 July 1878 – 30 August 1972) was an English writer, known chiefly as a critic and authority on John Milton; also, a poet and fantasy writer. He was credited as E. H. Visiak by 1909.

== Life ==
He was born in Ealing, London, the son of Edward Joseph Physick, who married in 1877 Maude Searcy, daughter of John Searcy. His grandfather Edward James Physick (1829–1906) was a sculptor, and secretary of the Congregationalist Paddington Chapel; the sculpture business was taken over on his death by Edward Joseph and another of the sons. William Henry Helm, writer and critic, who married in 1881 Ada Emmeline Physick, the youngest daughter, was his maternal uncle.

Physick went to Hitchin Grammar School (now Hitchin Boys School), and also had some private tutoring. He became a clerk with the Indo-European Telegraph Company, working in London's Mincing Lane and also for a period in Manchester.

During World War I Physick wrote poetry under the Visiak name, and the anti-war message of his poetry eventually cost him his job. When conscription was introduced, he became a conscientious objector. He spent some time as an agricultural labourer, and then taught in a preparatory school. He published a poem in 1917 in The Ploughshare, the journal of the Socialist Quaker Society, edited by William Loftus Hare, and Hubert W. Peet, another conscientious objector.

Visiak's father died in 1921, and he then lived with and cared for his mother. In 1923 he was running a boys' preparatory school, Ascham House, in Brondesbury, with A. J. Welch. They moved to Hove in World War II; she died in 1952 at age 98.

Around 1967, when Colin Wilson wrote to him about Voyage to Arcturus, Visiak was living in a nursing home. The summer 1967 issue of the Aylesford Review was a "Homage to E. H. Visiak". Contributors included the poet Kenneth Hopkins (1914–1988) and Wilson. At the end of his life, in 1971, Visiak published a poem in the ADAM International Review edited by Miron Grindea.

== Works ==
Taking on the pseudonym Visiak, he contributed poetry to The New Age. He was among the broad-based group of writers in the New Age who followed Mary Gawthorpe's lead and contributed to Dora Marsden's Freewoman in 1911–2. His poetry appeared "all over" the magazine, according to Bruce Clarke, who considers it "undistinguished". It was noted by Rebecca West, as from the only other literary contributor.

During the 1930s Visiak's poetry was published in Edwardian Poetry and Neo-Georgian Poetry edited by John Gawsworth. He collaborated on short stories, with Gawsworth in particular. A friend of and enthusiast for the Scottish novelist David Lindsay, he provided an introductory note for Lindsay's novel A Voyage to Arcturus. He wrote three short macabre novels of his own, The Haunted Island, Medusa and The Shadow, and the autobiography Life's Morning Hour. The Shadow was incorporated in Gawsworth's anthology Crimes, Creeps and Thrills (1936), which also included Visiak's story "Medusan Madness".

=== Poetry ===
- Buccaneer Ballads (1910). Published by Elkin Mathews, it had an introduction by John Masefield, and a frontispiece by Violet Helm, daughter of William Henry Helm.
- Flints and Flashes (1911), introduction by Alfred Lilley
- The Phantom Ship (1912), introduction by W. H. Helm
- The Battle Fiends (1916)
- Brief Poems (1919)
- Richards' Shilling Selections from Edwardian Poets: E.H. Visiak (Richards Press, 1936), edited by John Gawsworth.

=== Novels ===
- The Haunted Island (1910, 1st edition Elkin Mathews, reprint Peter Lund, 1946)). It features the adventures of Francis and Dick Clayton in the 17th century, who sail a seized ship to one of the Juan Fernández Islands. They there fall into the hands of pirates, meet a ghost, and a wizard who rules over a colony of slaves. Ultimately they find a treasure.
- The War of the Schools (1912) with C. V. Hawkins
- Medusa: A Story of Mystery (1929)
- The Shadow (1936)

=== Literary criticism ===
- Milton Agonistes: a metaphysical criticism (1923)
- The Animus Against Milton (1945, Grasshopper Press, reprinted 1970)
- Mirror of Conrad (1955)
- The Portent of Milton: Some Aspects of His Genius (1958)
- The Strange Genius of David Lindsay (1970; with J. B. Pick and Colin Wilson)

=== As editor ===
- The Mask of Comus (1937)
- Milton's Lament for Damon and his other Latin poems (1935; with Walter W. Skeat)
- Milton: Complete Poetry and Selected Prose, with English Metrical Translations of the Latin, Greek and Italian Poems (1938, later edition 1952). Nonesuch Press, foreword by Arnold Wilson.

=== Autobiography ===
- Life's Morning Hour (1969)

== Critical reception ==
His novel Medusa: A Story of Mystery (1929) became popular in the 1960s following a reprint in mass market paperback. Mike Ashley describes Medusa as Visiak's "premier achievement". Medusa was also included by horror historian Robert S. Hadji in his list of "unjustly neglected" horror novels. An essay on the novel by Karl Edward Wagner appears in the anthology Horror: 100 Best Books (1988; revised edition 1992). China Miéville has also expressed admiration for Visiak's work.

== Critical study/anthology ==
- Harrison-Barbet, Anthony (Introduction by Colin Wilson). E. H. Visiak: Writer and Mystic (2007), Nottingham, England: Paupers' Press ISBN 978-0-946650-92-7
