= David Lindsay (novelist) =

Scottish writer (1876–1945)

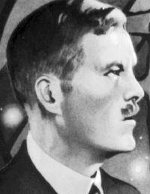
- Born: 3 March 1876; Lewisham, England
- Died: 16 July 1945 (aged 69); Hove, England
- Occupations: Insurance clerk, writer

David Lindsay (3 March 1876 – 16 July 1945) was a Scottish author best remembered for the philosophical science fiction novel A Voyage to Arcturus (1920).

== Biography ==
Lindsay was born into a middle-class Scottish Calvinist family in London, and was brought up partly in Jedburgh, where he had family background. He was educated at Colfe's School, Lewisham, and won a scholarship to university, but for financial reasons went into business, becoming an insurance clerk at Lloyd's of London. He was successful, but his career was interrupted by service in the First World War, starting at the age of 40. He first joined the Grenadier Guards, then the Royal Army Pay Corps, in which he was promoted to Corporal.

After the war Lindsay and his young wife, Jacqueline Silver, moved to Porth near Newquay in Cornwall, and lived there from 1919 to 1929. He became a full-time writer there. His novel A Voyage to Arcturus was published in 1920, but it was not a success, selling fewer than six hundred copies. The work shows links with Scottish fantasists such as George MacDonald, whose work Lindsay was familiar with, and it had a central influence on C. S. Lewis's Out of the Silent Planet. J. R. R. Tolkien said that he had read the book "with avidity", and characterised it as a work of philosophy, religion and morality.

Lindsay attempted to write a more commercial novel with his next work The Haunted Woman (1922), but this was barely more successful than Voyage. He continued to write novels, including the humorous potboiler The Adventures of Monsieur de Mailly, set in France in the time of Louis XIV. After publishing Devil's Tor in 1932 he found it increasingly difficult to get his work issued and spent much of his time on his last work, The Witch, which was not published in his lifetime.

With his wife, Lindsay opened a boarding house in Brighton, but they did not prosper and their marriage came under considerable strain. The house was damaged by the first bomb to fall on Brighton in the Second World War, and Lindsay, who was in his bath at the time, never recovered from the shock. His death from an infection resulting from an abscess in his tooth was unrelated to the bomb; Darrell Schweitzer attributed it to Lindsay allowing "rotting teeth to develop into cancer of the jaw".

== Work ==
A Voyage to Arcturus has been described as the major "underground" novel of the 20th century. The secret of Lindsay's apparent originality as a novelist lies in his metaphysical assumptions. Like the gnostics he seems to have viewed the "real" world as an illusion, which must be rejected in order to perceive genuine "truth". In The Haunted Woman, the two main characters discover a room which seems to exist only some of the time; while they are there together, they can see more clearly and express themselves honestly. In The Violet Apple, the fruit of the title is of the species eaten by Adam and Eve, and Lindsay's description of its effects is a startling, lyrical episode in a novel which is otherwise concerned with rather ordinary matters.

Lindsay's austere vision of "true reality" seems to have been influenced by Norse mythology. After being out of print for many decades, Lindsay's work has become increasingly available. In 1971, A Voyage to Arcturus was produced as a 35mm feature film by William J. Holloway. It was the first film to be funded by an American National Endowment for the Arts grant and has recently been re-released. American literary critic Harold Bloom was also interested in Lindsay's life and career, going so far as to publish a novel, The Flight to Lucifer, which he thought of as a Bloomian misprision, an homage and deep revision of A Voyage to Arcturus. Bloom, however, conceded that his late-comer imitation is overwhelmed by Lindsay's great original. Colin Wilson was also interested in David Lindsay. He wrote an essay, "The Haunted Man: Lindsay as Novelist and Mystic" that first appeared in the book The Strange Genius of David Lindsay (1970), as well as prefaces to The Violet Apple, The Witch and Sphinx.

== Bibliography ==
- A Voyage to Arcturus (1920)
- The Haunted Woman (1922)
- Sphinx (1923)
- The Violet Apple (1924, first published 1976)
- Adventures of Monsieur de Mailly (1926) [UK]; A Blade for Sale (1927) [US]
- Devil's Tor (1932)
- A Christmas Play (1930s, first published 2003)
- The Witch (unfinished, first published 1976)

== Sources ==
- The Strange Genius of David Lindsay: An Appreciation (1970) by J. B. Pick, E. H. Visiak and Colin Wilson
- The Life and Works of David Lindsay (1983) by Bernard Sellin, Cambridge University Press, ISBN 978-0521034012
- David Lindsay's Vision by David Power (2005)
- David Lindsay by Gary K. Wolfe (Wildside Press LLC, 1982) ISBN 0-916732-26-6
- Galad Elflandsson "David Lindsay and the Quest for Muspel-Fire" in Darrell Schweitzer (ed) Discovering Classic Fantasy Fiction, Gillette NJ: Wildside Press, 1986, pp. 104–112.
