= Elwin Ransom =

Fictional character created by C. S. Lewis

Elwin Ransom is the main character in the first two books of C. S. Lewis' The Space Trilogy, namely Out of the Silent Planet and Perelandra. In the final book, That Hideous Strength, he is a lesser character (the main characters being Mark and Jane Studdock) in charge of a group that is resisting demons that are trying to take over Earth, and playing the role of a mentor.

Ransom is a philologist at Cambridge, and a bachelor. According to several references in Perelandra, Ransom also served in the First World War, similarly to J.R.R. Tolkien, a good friend of C. S. Lewis's. Ransom prefers to spend his holidays alone, hence his capture by the antagonists Weston and Devine. When he is captured, Ransom discovers that his purpose is to serve as a 'ransom' for the entire human race, allowing Weston and Devine to continue their explorations of the planet Malacandra (Mars). By That Hideous Strength, Ransom had been thoroughly changed by his experiences. Ransom's past role of imparting Bible-like occurrences is passed on to the Studdocks.

Many books by C. S. Lewis can be considered "theological science fiction" or "Christian science fiction". This genre is uncommon, and depicts sci-fi stories with the basic beliefs of Christianity tied into them.

== Lewis's concept of Ransom ==
=== Background ===
Some casual references in Perelandra reveal that he had fought in the First World War, that he had been on the Somme, and that on one occasion he had to overcome considerable trepidation before accepting - and successfully implementing - an unspecified "very dangerous job". However, it is noted that the horrors Ransom had witnessed on the battlefield did not destroy his sensitivity for suffering, even the suffering of animals.

Accordingly, Ransom's birth has to be placed in 1899 or 1900 at the latest - assuming that he had fought only in 1918 (the war's last year) and had waited to legal age before signing up; if he had already been on the Somme in 1916, he must have been born in 1897 or 1898 at the latest. This fits with the mention of his being "middle aged" during the events of Perelandra in the 1940s. Lewis might have conceived of Ransom as being his own age, i.e., born in 1898; J.R.R. Tolkien, one of Lewis's inspirations for the character, was born in 1892.

It is also mentioned that, at some later point in his life, he had "to screw up his resolution to go and see a certain man in London and make to him an excessively embarrassing confession which justice demanded"—which Ransom eventually did, and of which no further details are given.

=== Personal life ===
He is a confirmed bachelor (as Lewis himself was at the time of writing), and in none of the three books is there any mention of a woman in his life. In That Hideous Strength, Jane Studdock falls in love with him, but there is no question of that love being returned; Ransom kindly but firmly pushes her back into the arms of her wayward husband, Mark. Nor does he have many male friends, either; when first introduced, he is in the habit of spending his university holidays hiking alone through the British countryside (which facilitates Weston's kidnapping him). By the end of the series, the wound sustained at Perelandra would preclude his continuing this habit. In the introductory chapters of Perelandra, however, it is revealed that Ransom regularly provides help to a large number of neighbors and acquaintances who have fallen on hard times. It is noteworthy that, although Ransom is very much a Christian believer, with a profound faith and knowledge of the Christian scriptures and theology, there is no mention of his belonging to any organized congregation.

=== Profession ===
He is a philologist by profession (like Tolkien), a linguistics professor, taking advantage of a unique aptitude for learning languages when he finds himself deserted among aliens. He speculates that this ability is the reason that he is 'chosen' for his role in the first and second books, although he notes in Perelandra that it might as well have been anyone else. A professor at Cambridge, he is highly regarded, even by his enemies, who in That Hideous Strength mention him as among the topmost in his field, noting that, but for his Christian convictions, he might have rendered very useful service to their cause.

After his sojourn on Malacandra/Mars, Ransom is mentioned as staying for a prolonged period at a cottage three miles outside "Worchester", having evidently left temporarily or permanently his Cambridge job. From there, he sets out on his voyage to Perelandra/Venus.

While on Venus, Ransom becomes in effect a prophet in the Biblical sense—i.e., a person to whom God speaks and on whom a specific Divine command is imposed (and who, like Jonah, strongly resists and makes a considerable effort to avoid, before bowing to the inevitable).

In That Hideous Strength Ransom's role is reversed. It is he, acting in effect as God's deputy, who inexorably imposes on the very reluctant Merlin the Divine mission of destroying the Satanic N.I.C.E., whose implementation would entail Merlin's own death.

=== Life ===
The permanent wound on his heel resulted from a physical battle with the demonically possessed Professor Weston in the deep caverns of Perelandra. It causes him continuing pain that he feels it is his duty to endure, refusing to relieve it either through medicine or through Merlin's magic.

The wound may refer to Genesis 3:15, where God curses the Snake for his tempting of Eve and causing the Original Sin: "And I will put enmity between you and the woman, and between your offspring and hers; he will crush your head, and you will strike his heel.(NIV)" The Biblical Snake is commonly considered in Christianity to have been a manifestation of Satan; so was the possessed Professor Weston. Thus, Weston could be considered an "offspring" of the Snake, and as such he did bite the heel of Ransom and got his own head crushed.

This wound is also a possible reference to the unhealing wound of the Fisher King, the ailing Grail King of Arthurian legend, which was a major theme in some of Charles Williams's works, a significant influence to The Space Trilogy: In the third book, Ransom has actually taken the name of "Fisher-King".

At some time between the second and third book, Ransom's life was further transformed radically by becoming the secret Pendragon, the latest in an unbroken chain of secret inheritors of King Arthur, who, it turns out, had been watching over Britain and helping their country in various crisis points in its history—a role that is crucially important to his relationship with the reawakened wizard Merlin. He establishes a kind of secret community at a big house in St. Anne's, which he heads, and which is the polar opposite and center of opposition to the literally Satanic institute of N.I.C.E., which in turn is threatening to take over the world. There, he is in regular contact with the descending planetary "gods" of the Graeco-Roman Pantheon (who are, in fact, not gods at all, but angels and faithful servants of the true, one and only God).

The third book, unlike the earlier two, is not told through Ransom's own eyes. He has become too much of an august and hieratic personage, seen mainly through the eyes of the book's female protagonist Jane Studdock, who falls in love with him — hopelessly, as she realizes from the start, especially since he is an unwavering upholder of the sanctity of marriage and clearly wants her to be reconciled with her estranged husband. In the final scene, Ransom kisses Jane for the first and last time, even while firmly commanding her to go to the bed of her waiting husband and to "Have no more dreams; have children instead" — which she does, while still feeling his kiss on her lips.

In the end, Ransom's role as a saint or prophet is enhanced by his being taken alive into Heaven (actually, back to Venus/Perelandra), an honour reserved only to a very small handful of particularly deserving Biblical and mythical characters.

=== Origins and inspiration ===
As is true with most of Lewis's writing, The Space Trilogy has religious symbolism in which Ransom takes on the role of a prophet preparing for the end times by resisting demonic forces on Earth and Perelandra. Even his last name is meant to be reminiscent of the sacrifice of Jesus.

Elwin Ransom may be based on C. S. Lewis's friend J. R. R. Tolkien ("Elwin" means "Elf friend" in Anglo-Saxon), though he seems to have autobiographical elements. In That Hideous Strength, Ransom, with his royal charisma and matter-of-fact breezy acceptance of the supernatural, appears less like Tolkien than like Charles Williams (or some of the heroes in Williams's books).

In the final chapter of the first book, the author flatly states that "Elwin Ransom" is a pseudonym; however, in the second book, great significance is attached to his surname (with a divine voice saying "It is not for nothing that you are named Ransom"), indicating that this is in fact the character's real name. The inconsistency was never explained.

== Other depictions ==
Robert Sataloff portrayed Ransom in the 1969 premiere cast of composer Donald Swann's opera adaptation of Perelandra.
