= Kathryn Lindskoog =

American C. S. Lewis scholar (1934–2003)

Kathryn Ann "Kay" Lindskoog (née Stillwell; December 26, 1934 – October 21, 2003) was an American C. S. Lewis scholar known partly for her theory that some works attributed to Lewis are forgeries, including The Dark Tower.

== Work on C. S. Lewis ==
The main target of Lindskoog's writing was Walter Hooper, Lewis' literary co-executor who edited most of Lewis' posthumous work. Lindskoog points out that Hooper's relationship with Lewis was overstated in some of the publications that he edited, and she argues that several works published under Lewis's name were in fact by Hooper.

C. S. Lewis' stepson, Douglas Gresham, denies the forgery claims, saying that "The whole controversy thing was engineered for very personal reasons ... Her fanciful theories have been pretty thoroughly discredited.". It is clear from the diaries of Warren Lewis that Lewis' brother distrusted Hooper, whom he viewed as a dishonest interloper in the 1960s. Lewis scholars are divided about the merits of Lindskoog's charges, but some of them have since been disproved by discovery of Lewis' own typescripts. Much of her perceived animosity towards Hooper may (or may not) have been derived from disappointment that she was not given any role in dealing with his literary legacy, though Lewis acknowledged her as knowledgeable about his bibliography. The controversy was analysed by Nicolas Barker in "Essays in Criticism" (see reference), where he calls Lindskoog's work "a poisoned book".

== Selected works ==
=== Related to C. S. Lewis ===
- Lion of Judah in Never-never Land: The theology of C. S. Lewis expressed in his fantasies for children (Eerdmans, 1973), preface by Walter Hooper – 1957 M.A. thesis, Cal State–Long Beach, as Kathryn Stillwell
- C.S. Lewis, Mere Christian (Regal, 1973; revised and expanded, Inter-Varsity Press, 1981; revised, Harold Shaw Publ., 1987; revised and expanded, Cornerstone Press, 1997)
- Around the Year with C. S. Lewis and His Friends (C.R. Gibson, 1986) – by date, with blank lines for diary or journal entries
- The C. S. Lewis Hoax (Multnomah Books, 1988)
- Light in the Shadowlands: Protecting the Real C.S. Lewis (Questar, 1994; Hope Publ. House, 1995) or illustrated by Patrick Wynne (Sisters, OR: Multnomah Books, 1994) LCCN 95-154593
- Finding the Landlord: A Guidebook to C.S. Lewis' Pilgrim's Regress (Chicago: Cornerstone Press, 1995), LCCN 95-34102
- Journey Into Narnia (Hope Publ. House, 1997), illus. Tim Kirk and Patrick Wynne – comprising The Lion of Judah (1957) and Exploring the Narnian Chronicles
- Surprised by C.S. Lewis George Macdonald and Dante: A Batch of New Discoveries (Macon, GA: Mercer U. Press, 2001), LCCN 2001-18014
- Sleuthing C.S. Lewis: More Light in the Shadowlands (Mercer, 2001), LCCN 2001-30190

=== Retellings, etc ===
- A Child's Garden of Christian Verses (Multnomah Press, 1983), adapted from Robert Louis Stevenson
- Dante's Divine Comedy (1997), retold, with notes
- Faerie Gold: treasures from the lands of enchantment (2005), edited by Lindskoog and Ranelda Mack Hunsicker

Lindskoog also edited and abridged classic children's novels for the Multnomah Press "Young Readers Library". Seven volumes were published from 1991 to 1993 and reissued by P&R Publishing from 2001 to 2003: Alcott's Little Women (originally 2 volumes), Burnett's The Little Princess, Defoe's Robinson Crusoe, Dodge's Hans Brinker, or, the Silver Skates, MacDonald's Sir Gibbie, and Sewell's Black Beauty. Lindskoog explained such "literary liposuction" in 1993. Among other things, she claimed to have answered a friendly telephone critic, "I'm as much of a purist as you. I absolutely love these authors. That's why I'm hand-polishing them for today's readers and performing what I call literary liposuction – removing flab and fat. I keep every bit of the original story, the style, and the values – even restoring parts cut out in other versions. I know my work would make the author happy; otherwise, I wouldn't do it."

=== Other ===
- Up from Eden (David C. Cook, 1976) [an uncommonly candid look at the complex choices facing Christian women today]; reissued 1977 as On My Way Up From Eden: a Christian Woman takes a whimsical but practical look at what she wants to be
- How to Grow a Young Reader (Harold Shaw Publ., 1978), as by John and Kay Lindskoog;

- How to Grow a Young Reader: a parent's guide to books for kids (revised, Harold Shaw, 1989), John and Kathryn Lindskoog
- How to Grow a Young Reader: Books from All Ages for Readers of All Ages (Harold Shaw, 2002), Kathryn Lindskoog and Ranelda Hunsicker

- The Gift of Dreams (Harper & Row, 1979)
- Creative Writing: for people who can't not write (1989)
- Over the Counter: A pharmacist tells how to keep your family healthy – and what to do when it isn't (Focus on the Family, 1989), as ghostwriter
- Fakes, Frauds and Other Malarkey: 301 Amazing Stories and How Not To Be Fooled: Spoofs, bunkum, ballyhoo, and criminal poppycock (1993)
