= A Voyage to Arcturus =

1920 novel by David Lindsay

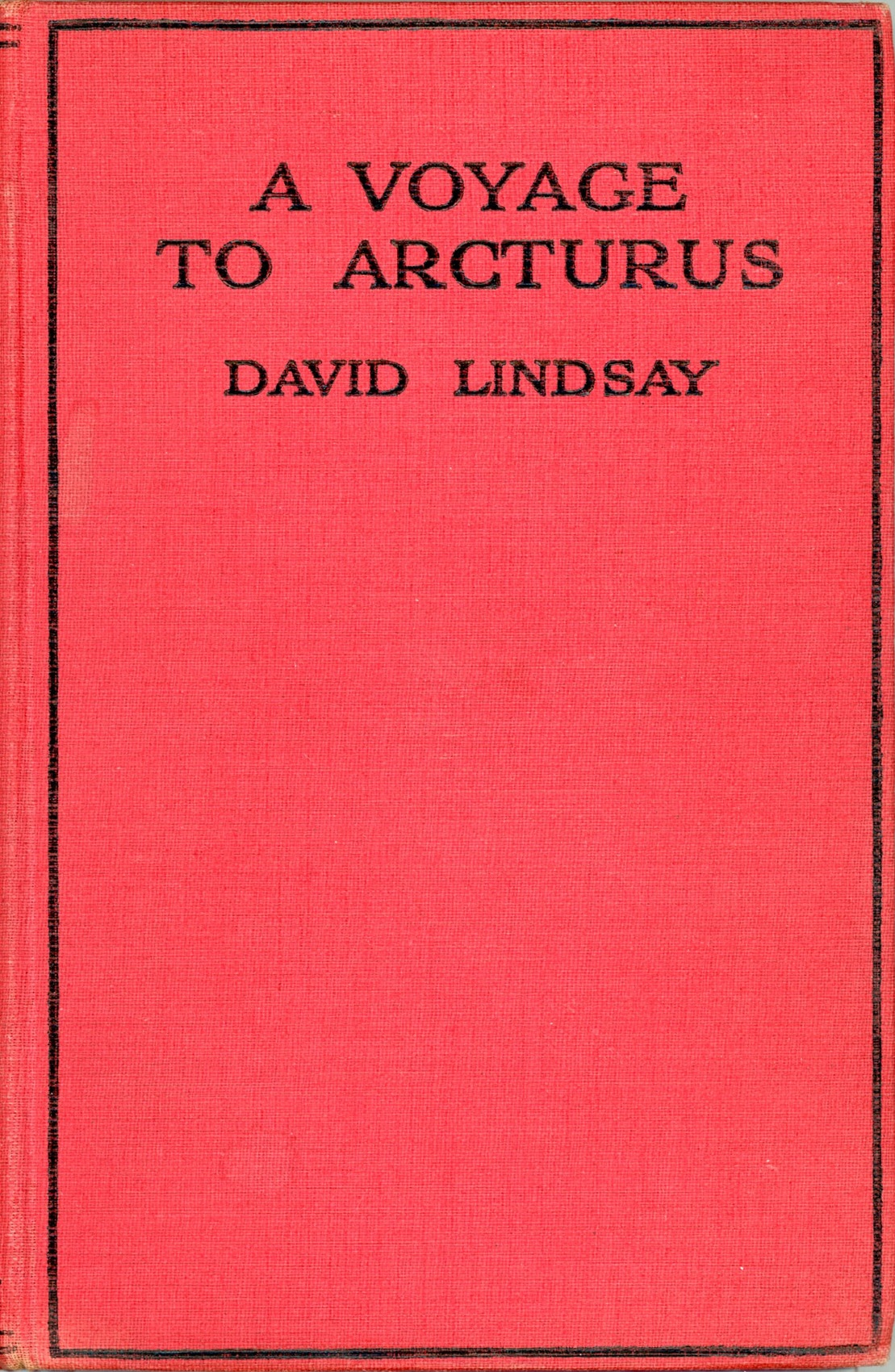
- Cover of the first edition
- Author: David Lindsay
- Language: English
- Genre: Fantasy, science fiction
- Publisher: Methuen & Co. Ltd.
- Publication date: 1920
- Publication place: United Kingdom
- Media type: Print (Hardcover and Paperback)
- Pages: 303 pp (first edition hardcover)
- Dewey Decimal: 823.912
- LC Class: PR6023.I58115 V68
- Text: A Voyage to Arcturus at Wikisource

A Voyage to Arcturus is a novel by the Scottish writer David Lindsay, first published in 1920. An interstellar voyage is the framework for a narrative of a journey through fantastic landscapes. The story is set on Tormance, an imaginary planet orbiting the star Arcturus. The lands through which the characters travel represent philosophical systems or states of mind as the main character, Maskull, searches for the meaning of reality. The book combines fantasy, philosophy, and science fiction in an exploration of the nature of good and evil and their relationship with existence. Described by critic, novelist, and philosopher Colin Wilson as the "greatest novel of the twentieth century", it was a central influence on C. S. Lewis' Space Trilogy, and through him on J. R. R. Tolkien, who said he read the book "with avidity". Clive Barker called it "a masterpiece" and "an extraordinary work ... quite magnificent".

The book sold poorly during Lindsay's lifetime, but was republished in 1946 (the year after his death) and many times thereafter. It has been translated into at least six languages. Critics such as the novelist Michael Moorcock have noted that the book is unusual, but that it has been highly influential with its qualities of "commitment to the Absolute" and "God-questioning genius".

== Background ==
David Lindsay was born in 1876. His father was a Scottish Calvinist and his mother English. He was brought up partly in London and partly in Jedburgh in the Scottish borders. He enjoyed reading novels by Walter Scott, Jules Verne, Rider Haggard and Robert Louis Stevenson. He learnt German to read the philosophical work of Schopenhauer and Nietzsche. He served in the army in a clerical position in London in the First World War, being called up at age 38. He married in 1916. After the war ended in 1918, he left his position with an insurance company and moved to Cornwall with his wife to write. Lindsay told his friend E. H. Visiak that his greatest influence was the work of George MacDonald.

== Synopsis ==
Tormance is a planet orbiting Arcturus, 37 light years from Earth. Arcturus is a double star, consisting of Branchspell, a large yellow sunlike star, and Alppain, a smaller blue star. The light of the second sun, Alppain, is only seen from the north; the southern parts of the planet are illuminated only by Branchspell. Maskull, longing for adventures, accepts an invitation from Krag, an acquaintance of his friend Nightspore, to travel to Tormance after a séance. The three travel to an abandoned observatory at Starkness in Scotland, where there is a tower which has Tormance's heavy gravity; climbing it is difficult. Maskull learns he will not return from the voyage. They set off in a "torpedo of crystal" from the top of the tower, propelled by Arcturian "back rays".

Maskull awakens to find himself alone in a desert on Tormance. His body has grown three new organs: a breve, a protuberance on his forehead that enables telepathy; poigns, two lumps on his neck that increase empathy; and a magn, a tentacle from his heart that increases his capacity for love. A woman, Joiwind, exchanges blood with him to allow him to survive on Tormance; she tells him that Surtur created everything. She worships Surtur. Her husband Panawe suggests that Maskull may have stolen something from the Maker of the universe, to ennoble his fellow creatures. Maskull travels to the Lusion Plain, where he meets a being who claims to be Surtur. The being says that Maskull is on Tormance to serve him, and disappears. Maskull meets a woman, Oceaxe, from Ifdawn, who has a third arm in place of her magn. She speaks scornfully to Maskill, but shows interest in having him as her lover, and gives him a red stone to convert his magn into a third arm. Maskull wakes to find his magn transformed into a third arm, which causes lust for what is touched, and his breve changed to an eyelike sorb which allows dominance over the will of others. He travels through Ifdawn with Oceaxe; she wants him to kill one of her husbands, Crimtyphon, and take his place. Maskull is at first revolted at the idea, but kills Crimtyphon when he sees him using his will to force a man into becoming a tree. Tydomin, another wife of Crimtyphon's, uses her will to force Oceaxe to commit suicide by walking off a cliff; she persuades Maskull to come to her home in Disscourn, where she will take possession of his body. On the way they find Joiwind's brother Digrung who says he will tell Joiwind about Maskull's murder of Crimtyphon; to prevent this, and encouraged by Tydomin, Maskull absorbs Digrung, leaving his empty body behind. At Tydomin's cave, Maskull goes out of his body to become an apparition that appeared at the seance where he met Krag. He awakens free of Tydomin's mental power.

Maskull takes Tydomin to Sant, resolved to kill her for her crimes. But a vision of Joiwind makes Maskull reprieve Tydomin. On the way they meet Spadevil, who proposes to reform Sant by amending its founder Hator's teaching with the notion of duty. He turns Maskull and Tydomin into his disciples by modifying their sorbs into twin membranes called probes. Catice, the guardian of Hator's doctrine in Sant, and who has only one probe, damages one of Maskull's to test Spadevil's arguments. This results in Maskull believing in Hator's ideas and he kills Spadevil and Tydomin. Catice sets Maskull on a path through the Wombflash Forest, having told him that their true home is called Muspel. Maskull awakes in the dense forest with a third eye as his only foreign organ, hears and follows a drumbeat, and meets Dreamsinter, who tells him that it was Nightspore whom Surtur brought to Tormance and that he, Maskull, is wanted to steal Muspel-light. Maskull travels to the shore of the Sinking Sea, from which Swaylone's Island can be seen. There he meets Polecrab, a fisherman, who is content to lead a simple life. Maskull goes to Swaylone's Island, where Earthrid plays a musical instrument called Irontick by night; no one who hears it ever returns. Maskull is accompanied by Gleameil, Polecrab's wife, who has left her family. Attracted by the music, she dies. Maskull forces Earthrid to let him play the instrument, but his playing is so violent that Irontick is destroyed and Earthrid is killed. Maskull crosses the sea by manoeuvring a many-eyed tree and reaches Matterplay, where alongside a creek that seems electrified a multitude of life-forms materialise and vanish before his eyes. He goes upstream and meets Leehallfae, an immensely old being of a third sex, who seeks the underground country of Threal where the god Faceny may dwell. They reach Threal through a cave. Leehallfae immediately falls ill and dies. Corpang appears and says this is because Threal is not Faceny's world, but Thire's, the creator of the world of feeling. Corpang takes Maskull to three statues, which represent three states of reality. He says that Maskull may be enlightened if he prays there. A voice whispers to Maskull that he is about to die. Corpang follows Maskull to Lichstorm, where they again hear drumbeats.

Maskull and Corpang meet Haunte, a hunter who travels in a boat that floats on the air thanks to masculine stones which repel earth's femininity. Maskull destroys the masculine rocks which protected Haunte from Sullenbode's femininity, and all three journey to her cave. Sullenbode, a woman whose face only becomes distinct when she is kissed, kisses Haunte and he dies. Maskull and Sullenbode desire each other. Sullenbode tells Maskull that from now on, if he stops loving her, she will die. Corpang goes eagerly ahead. Maskull has a powerful vision of the end of his quest and during that time is indifferent to Sullenbode's attentions, causing her to die. Maskull buries her and then encounters Krag again, and they then meet up with Gangnet, who seems to have a long-standing antagonistic relationship with Krag. The three travel together to the ocean and set out on a raft. When the sun Alppain rises, Maskull sees in a vision Krag causing the drumbeat by beating his heart, and Gangnet, who is Crystalman, dying in torment enveloped by Muspel-fire. Gangnet/Crystalman disappears. Maskull learns that he is in fact Nightspore, and dies. Krag tells Nightspore he, Krag, is Surtur. On Earth he is known as pain. Krag teaches Nightspore about the reality of the Universe, in which a constant struggle is taking place between Surtur and the usurper Crystalman. Nightspore joins Krag/Surtur in the struggle for the fate of the universe against Crystalman.

== Publication history ==
Methuen agreed to publish A Voyage to Arcturus, but only if Lindsay agreed to cut 15,000 words, which he did. These passages are assumed lost forever. Methuen also insisted on a change of title, from Lindsay's original (Nightspore in Tormance), as it was considered too obscure. Of an original press run of 1430 copies, no more than 596 were sold in total. The novel was made widely available in paperback form when published as one of the precursor volumes to the Ballantine Adult Fantasy series in 1968, featuring a cover by the illustrator Bob Pepper.

Editions of A Voyage to Arcturus have been published in 1920 (Methuen), 1946 (Gollancz), 1963 (Gollancz, Macmillan, Ballantine), 1968 (Gollancz, Ballantine),1971 (Gollancz), 1972, 1973, 1974 (Ballantine), 1978 (Gollancz), 1992 (Canongate), 2002 (University of Nebraska Press), and later by several other publishers. It has been translated into at least six languages.

== Analysis ==
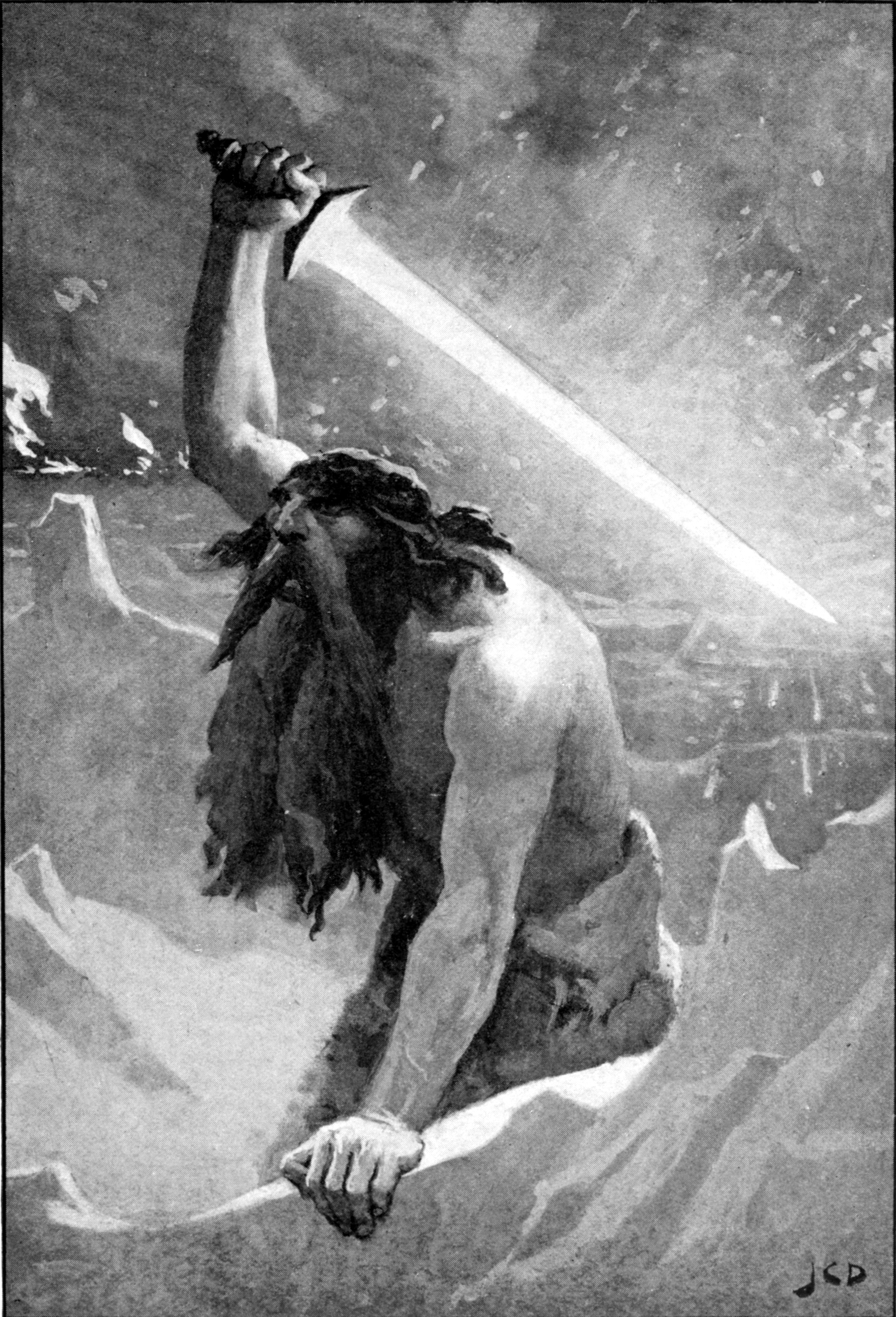
Lindsay borrowed the names "Surtur" and "Muspel" from Surtr, the lord of Múspellsheimr, shown here in a 1909 painting by John Charles Dollman.

Lindsay's choice of title (and therefore the setting in Arcturus) may have been influenced by the nonfictional A Voyage to the Arctic in the Whaler Aurora (1911), a book by his namesake, David Moore Lindsay about the ship SY Aurora. The scholar Kathryn Hume writes that with the name of the planet, Tormance, and its sun, Alppain, Lindsay "is cosmically punning on the yogic tenet that all existence, all consciousness, is pain". The historian Shimon de Valencia states that the names "Surtur" and "Muspel" are taken from Surtr, the lord of Múspellsheimr (the world of fire) in Norse mythology.

The novel is recognised for its strangeness. Tormance's features include its alien sea, with water so dense that it can be walked on. Gnawl water is sufficient food to sustain life on its own. The local spectrum includes two primary colours unknown on Earth, ulfire and jale, and a third colour, dolm, said to be compounded of ulfire and blue. The sexuality of the Tormance species is ambiguous; Lindsay coined a new gender-neutral pronoun series, ae, aer, and aerself for the phaen, who are humanoid, but formed of air.

Hume writes that the book evidently has a deeper meaning, which may be strictly allegorical or more broadly "visionary" like the work of William Blake; and that this has both attracted a cult following, and prevented the book from reaching a wider audience. Hume describes the planet of Arcturus, far from being a standard science fiction setting, as having a threefold function: the literal setting for a "quest romance"; the psychological frame, "a projection of the faculties of the mind"; and an allegorical paysage moralisé, like the moralised landscapes of Pilgrim's Progress or Piers Plowman.

Hume contrasts A Voyage to Arcturus with Christian allegory, which, she writes, makes its direction and plan clear to the reader. She gives as one example the seven circles of Dante's 14th century Inferno, which are organised by the seven deadly sins. She notes, too, that readers readily see in Maskull's steady journey through many challenges a reflection of John Bunyan's The Pilgrim's Progress (1678) in which Pilgrim journeys continuously through the trials of the world towards salvation. Lindsay's "original allegory" has its own framework, which is the hierarchy of experiences on the road to enlightenment, from Pleasure to Pain, Love, Nothing, and finally Something. This structure is compounded by having the protagonist examine the world in terms of the dyad of I and not-I, and the triad of "material creation, relation, and religious feeling"; in the end, Maskull transcends personality for dualism on both the macrocosmic and the microcosmic scales.

Lindsay’s cosmology in the novel has close parallels with Gnosticism, a religious movement of early Christianity. Gnosticism posits a cosmic dualism, with the transcendent true God existing beyond the known universe, which was created by a rival, called the Demiurge. Human beings all have a divine spark, which wants to be reunited with the true God, but is imprisoned in a material body in this thoroughly evil universe.

As Maskull begins to learn the true nature of reality he tells Corpang "Life is wrong and the creator of life too." Nightspore’s intention to assist Surtur in the struggle with Crystalman would, if Surtur triumphed, have a startling outcome. If Surtur defeated Crystalman, this would mean the end of all life, life just being a byproduct of Crystalman’s usurpation and consumption of Surtur’s divine energy. Lindsay’s cosmic pessimism here has similarities to the philosophy of H.P Lovecraft. The powerful horror produced in Lovecraft’s fiction derives in part from his belief that the universe is ultimately both indifferent to human values and unknowable.

== Reception ==
The critic and philosopher Colin Wilson described A Voyage to Arcturus as the "greatest novel of the twentieth century". The playwright and novelist Clive Barker stated that "A Voyage to Arcturus is a masterpiece", calling it "an extraordinary work ... quite magnificent." The fantasy author Philip Pullman named it for The Guardian as the book he thought was most underrated.

Reviewing the book in 2002, the novelist Michael Moorcock asserted that "Few English novels have been as eccentric or, ultimately, as influential". He noted that Alan Moore, introducing the 2002 edition, had compared the book to John Bunyan's Pilgrim's Progress (1678) and Arthur Machen's The Great God Pan (1890), but that it nevertheless stood "as one of the great originals". In Moorcock's view, although the character Maskull seems to be commanded to do whatever is needed to save his soul, in a kind of "Nietzschean Pilgrim's Progress", Lindsay's writing does not fall into fascism. Like Hitler, Moorcock argued, Lindsay was traumatised by the trench fighting of the First World War, but the "astonishing and dramatic ambiguity of the novel's resolution" makes the novel the antithesis of Hitler's "visionary brutalism". Moorcock noted that while the book had influenced C. S. Lewis's science fiction trilogy, Lewis had "refused Lindsay's commitment to the Absolute and lacked his God-questioning genius, the very qualities which give this strange book its compelling, almost mesmerising influence."

Also in 2002, Steven H. Silver, criticising A Voyage to Arcturus on SF Site, observed that for a novel it has little plot or characterisation, and furthermore that it gives no motives for the actions taken by its characters. In his view, the book's strength lay in its "philosophical musings" on humanity after the First World War. Silver compared the book not with later science fiction but with the earlier authors H. G. Wells and Jules Verne, commenting however that Lindsay had "neither author's prose skills." He suggested that Lindsay was combining philosophy with an adventure tale in the manner of Edgar Rice Burroughs.

== Legacy ==
=== Impact ===
The novel was a central influence on C. S. Lewis's 1938–1945 Space Trilogy; he called A Voyage to Arcturus "shattering, intolerable, and irresistible". Lewis also mentioned the "sorbing" (aggressive absorption of another's personality into one's own, fatal to the other person) as an influence on his 1942 book The Screwtape Letters. Lewis in turn recommended the book to J. R. R. Tolkien, who said he read it "with avidity", finding it more powerful, more mythical, but less of a story than Lewis's Out of the Silent Planet; he commented that "no one could read it merely as a thriller and without interest in philosophy[,] religion[,] and morals". Tolkien, who used frame stories in his novels, did not approve of the frame story machinery, the back-rays and the crystal torpedo ship, that Lindsay had used; in his unfinished novel The Notion Club Papers, Tolkien makes one of the protagonists, Guildford, criticise those kinds of "contraptions".

In 1984, the composer John Ogdon wrote an oratorio entitled A Voyage to Arcturus, based on Lindsay's novel and biblical quotations. Ogdon's biographer, Charles Beauclerk, notes that Lindsay was also a composer, and that the novel discusses the nature and meaning of music. In Beauclerk's view, Ogdon saw Lindsay's novel as a religious work, where for instance the wild three-eyed, three-armed woman Oceaxe becomes Oceania, described in the Bible's Book of Revelation chapter 12 as "a woman cloth'd with the sun, and the moon under her feet".

=== Adaptations ===
The BBC Third Programme presented a radio dramatisation of the novel in 1956. Critic Harold Bloom, in his only attempt at fiction writing, wrote a sequel to this novel, entitled The Flight to Lucifer. Bloom has since critiqued the book as a poor continuation of the narrative. William J. Holloway, then a student at Antioch College in Yellow Springs, Ohio, created a 71-minute film adaptation of the novel in 1970. The film, unavailable for many years, was independently restored, re-edited and colour-enhanced, to be redistributed on DVD-R in 2005. In 1985, a three-hour play by David Wolpe based on the novel was staged in Los Angeles. Paul Corfield Godfrey wrote an operatic setting based on the novel to a libretto by Richard Charles Rose; it was performed at the Sherman Theatre Cardiff in 1983. The jazz composer Ron Thomas recorded a concept album inspired by the novel in 2001 entitled Scenes from A Voyage to Arcturus. The Ukrainian house producer Vakula (Mikhaylo Vityk) released an imaginary soundtrack called A Voyage To Arcturus as a triple LP in 2015. A musical based on the novel was written by Phil Moore and performed in 2019 at the Peninsula Theatre, Woy Woy, Australia. This production was filmed and is available on some streaming platforms.

== See also ==
- 1920 in science fiction
- Arcturians (New Age)
- The Flight to Lucifer, Harold Bloom's sequel.

== Bibliography ==
- Lindsay, David (1920). A Voyage to Arcturus. Methuen. OCLC 606220214.
