= Perelandra =

1943 novel by C. S. Lewis

- First edition cover
- Author: C. S. Lewis
- Language: English
- Series: The Space Trilogy
- Genre: Science fiction novel, Theological fiction
- Publisher: The Bodley Head
- Publication date: 1943
- Publication place: United Kingdom
- Media type: Print (Hardback & Paperback)
- Pages: 243 (hard cover)
- Preceded by: Out of the Silent Planet
- Followed by: That Hideous Strength

Perelandra (also titled Voyage to Venus in a later edition published by Pan Books) is the second book in the Space Trilogy of C. S. Lewis, set on the planet of Perelandra, or Venus. It was first published in 1943.

== Plot summary ==
Philologist Elwin Ransom, some years after his return from Mars at the end of Out of the Silent Planet, receives a new mission from the Oyarsa (the angelic ruler) of Mars. Ransom summons narrator-Lewis to his country home. Ransom explains to Lewis that he (Ransom) is to travel to Perelandra (Venus), where he is to counter some kind of attack – details not yet specified – to be launched by Earth's Black Archon (Satan).

Ransom is transported in a casket-like vessel which is seemingly made of ice and contains only himself, unclad, as Oyarsa tells him clothes are unnecessary on Venus. He returns to Earth over a year later and is met by Lewis and another friend, then recounts his experiences. The remainder of the story is told from Ransom's point of view, with Lewis acting as interlocutor and occasional commentator.

Ransom arrives in Venus after a quick journey through interplanetary space. He finds that the surface of the planet is covered in a freshwater ocean which is dotted with floating rafts of vegetation. These rafts resemble islands, to the extent of having plant and animal life upon them, including edible plants and plants large enough to provide shelter. As the rafts have no geologic foundations, they are in a constant state of motion. The planet's sole observable geological feature is a stony mountain called the Fixed Land. The planet's thick atmosphere hides the sun and stars, although like Earth, the planet rotates and has days and nights.

Ransom soon meets the Queen of the planet. She is a carefree being who soon accepts him as a friend. Unlike the inhabitants of Mars in Out of the Silent Planet, she resembles a human in physical appearance with the exception of her green skin. She and her husband the King are the first, and so far the only, human inhabitants of their world. The two of them live on the floating raft-islands and are forbidden, by Maleldil's divine command, to sleep on the Fixed Land. Ransom finds that in the spiritually pure context, the beautiful naked queen arouses no sexual desire or temptation in him, even though the King himself is away elsewhere on the planet.

Professor Weston arrives in a spaceship and lands in a part of the ocean quite close to the Fixed Land. Instead of the strictly materialist attitude he displayed when first meeting Ransom, he now tells Ransom that he has become aware of the existence of supernatural spiritual beings. He pledges his allegiance to what he calls the "Life-Force", which, he says, has been guiding him in extraordinary ways. After an increasingly disturbing monologue, he succumbs to full demonic possession.

Now under demonic control, the possessed Weston finds the Queen and tries to tempt her into defying Maleldil's law by spending a night on the Fixed Land. Ransom realises why the Oyarsa has brought him to Perelandra: to counter the tempter by persuading the Queen to obey Maleldil's prohibition, and to prevent the Perelandran counterpart to the Fall of humanity on Earth. In the Queen's presence, he struggles through day after day of exhausting argument against the demonic Weston, who shows super-human brilliance in debate. Weston's possessed body requires no sleep; this enables him to use methods other than explicit arguments while Ransom sleeps. The tempter tells the Queen many stories of heroic defiance and introduces her to self-gratifying vanities such as clothing, makeup, and mirrors. On occasions when the Queen is sleeping and Ransom is awake, the tempter attacks Ransom's morale by engaging in infantile obscenities and by torturing and mutilating small native animals.

With the demonic Weston on the verge of winning, Ransom senses a divine command to terminate the argument altogether and battle the Tempter physically, hand to hand. The prospect terrifies Ransom, who is a slight, middle-aged man with no recent fighting prowess. He debates for hours with the divine inner voice, until he is suddenly blessed with awareness that he cannot refuse the command to fight: his personal character simply rules out the possibility of refusing. He also perceives that the distinction between personal choice (free will) and personal destiny (pre-destination) is not a real distinction at all; the two are, somehow, exactly the same thing.

Ransom physically attacks his opponent (who is still inhabiting Weston's body). As the fight progresses, he finds himself inspired to greater and greater fury, shouting battle-cries he has never heard and using combat techniques he has never learned. After fierce, punishing resistance, the enemy flees. Ransom chases him over the ocean, both riding on the backs of giant friendly fish. Their struggle continues in water and in a rocky underground tunnel, alternating between verbal argument and physical combat, until Ransom finally throws Weston's possessed body into a pool of fiery lava, terminating the demon's presence on the planet altogether.

Ransom finds his way to the surface, and recuperates from his injuries. Only a bite-wound on his heel refuses to close and continues bleeding for the rest of his life. Ransom carves a memorial inscription for Weston, to commemorate his scientific achievements, while also recording his surrender to the Devil.

Ransom meets the King and Queen together with the Oyéresu of Mars and Venus, the latter of whom transfers dominion of the planet to the King and Queen. All the characters celebrate the prevention of a second biblical "Fall" and the beginning of a utopian paradise in this new world. The story reaches its climax with Ransom's vision of "The Great Dance": the exchange of higher and lower, as when an adviser gives power to a royal child. Ransom is then returned to Earth, covered in celebratory flower-petals.

== Publication history ==
- 1943, UK, The Bodley Head, N/A, 20 April 1943, hardback (first edition)
- 1996, USA, Simon & Schuster, ISBN 0-684-83365-4, publication date October 1996, hardback
- 2003, USA, Simon & Schuster, ISBN 978-0-7432-3491-7, publication date 7 April 2003, paperback
- 2012, USA, HarperCollins, ISBN 9780062196934, publication date April 2012, electronic book
- Unabridged reading by Alex Jennings broadcast on BBC Radio 7's The Seventh Dimension in 18 parts, originally 2003, repeated 2008.

== Adaptations ==
The book was adapted into an opera by composer Donald Swann which was first staged in 1969 with Robert Sataloff as Ransom.

== See also ==
- J.R.R. Tolkien
- The Inklings
- Theological fiction
- Science fiction
