= Alastair Fowler =

Scottish literary critic and editor (1930–2022)

Alastair David Shaw Fowler CBE FBA (17 August 1930 – 9 October 2022) was a Scottish literary critic, editor, and an authority on Edmund Spenser, Renaissance literature, genre theory, and numerology.

== Life and career ==
Alastair Fowler was born in Glasgow, Scotland in 1930. He was educated at Queen's Park Secondary School, the University of Glasgow, where he briefly studied medicine, and the University of Edinburgh, where he was awarded an M.A. in English Language and Literature in 1952. He was subsequently awarded a further M.A. (1955), D.Phil. (1957) and D.Litt. (1962) from Pembroke College, Oxford. As a graduate student at Oxford, Fowler studied with C. S. Lewis, and later edited Lewis's Spenser's Images of Life.

Fowler was a junior research fellow at Queen's College, Oxford (1955–1959). He also taught at University College, Swansea (1959–1961), and Brasenose College, Oxford (1962–1971), where his students included Michael Palin. He was Regius Professor of literature at the University of Edinburgh (1972–1984) and also taught intermittently at universities in the United States, including Columbia (1964) and the University of Virginia (1969, 1979, 1985–1998). He delivered the 1980 Warton Lecture on English Poetry.

Known for his editorial work, Fowler's edition of John Milton's Paradise Lost, part of the Longman poets series, has some of the most scholarly and detailed notes on the poem and is widely cited by Milton scholars. Writing in The Guardian, John Mullan called it "a monument of scholarship."

Fowler was critical of some later trends in literary scholarship, including "new historicism". In 2005, he published an extremely critical review of Stephen Greenblatt's Will in the World, which was widely discussed.

Fowler was appointed Commander of the Order of the British Empire (CBE) in the 2014 New Year Honours for services to literature and education. His papers are on deposit at the National Library of Scotland.

Fowler died on 9 October 2022, at the age of 92.

== Work ==
=== Edited volumes ===
- C. S. Lewis, Spenser's Images of Life, 1967
- John Milton, Paradise Lost, 1968, revised edition 2006
- Silent Poetry: Essays in Numerological Analysis, 1970
- Topics in Criticism, ed., with Christopher Butler, 1971
- The New Oxford Book of Seventeenth-Century Verse, 1991, 2008
- The Country House Poem, 1994.

=== Authored volumes (criticism) ===
- Spenser and the Numbers of Time, 1964.
- Triumphal Forms: Structural Patterns in Elizabethan Poetry, 1970
- Conceitful Thought: Interpretation of English Renaissance Poems, 1975
- Kinds of Literature, 1982.
- A History of English Literature, 1987
- Times Purple Masquers: Stars and the Afterlife in Renaissance English Literature, 1996
- Renaissance Realism, 2003
- How to Write, 2006
- Literary Names: Personal Names in English Literature, 2012

=== Authored volumes (poetry) ===
- Seventeen, 1971
- Catacomb Suburb, 1976
- From the Domain of Arnheim, 1982
- Helen's Topless Towers, 1993

== Reviews ==
- Craig, Cairns (1982), Giving Speech to the Silent, which includes a review of From the Domain of Arnheim, in Hearn, Sheila G. (ed.), Cencrastus No. 10, Autumn 1982, pp. 43 & 44, ISSN 0264-0856

== See also ==
- Poioumenon
