= Out of the Silent Planet =

1938 novel by C. S. Lewis

- First edition
- Author: C. S. Lewis
- Cover artist: Harold Jones
- Language: English
- Series: The Space Trilogy
- Genre: Science fiction novel
- Published: 1938 (John Lane (first))
- Publication place: United Kingdom
- Media type: Print (hardcover & paperback)
- Pages: 264 pp (first edition, hard)
- Followed by: Perelandra

Out of the Silent Planet is a science fiction novel by the British author C. S. Lewis, first published in 1938 by John Lane, The Bodley Head. Two sequels were published in 1943 and 1945, completing the Space Trilogy.

== Plot ==
While on a walking tour, the philologist Elwin Ransom is drugged and taken on board a spacecraft bound for a planet called Malacandra. His abductors are Devine, a former college acquaintance, and the scientist Weston. Wonder and excitement relieve his anguish at being kidnapped, but he is put on his guard when he overhears his captors discussing their plans to turn him over to the inhabitants of Malacandra as a sacrifice.

Soon after the three land, Ransom escapes and then runs off in terror upon first seeing the vaguely humanoid but alien sorns. In his wanderings, he finds that all the lakes, streams, and rivers are warm, that gravity is significantly lower than on Earth, and that the plants and mountains are all extremely tall and thin. After meeting a hross named Hyoi, a civilised native of a different species, Ransom becomes a guest for several weeks in Hyoi's village, where he uses his philological skills to learn the language. Discovering that gold (known as "sun's blood"), is plentiful on Malacandra, he discerns Devine's motive for making the voyage.

While out hunting, Ransom and his hrossa companions are told by an eldil, an almost invisible, angelic creature, that Ransom must go to meet Oyarsa, who is ruler of the planet, and indeed that he should already have done so. Shortly after, Hyoi is shot dead by Devine and Weston as they track Ransom, and Ransom is directed by the hrossa to comply with the eldil's instructions and cross the mountains to the cave of a sorn named Augray.

On the way Ransom discovers that he has almost reached the limit of breathable air and has to be revived by Augray with a flask of oxygen. The next day, carrying Ransom on his shoulder, Augray takes him across the bleak tableland and down into another river valley to Meldilorn, the island home of Oyarsa. There Ransom meets another species, a pfifltrigg who tells him about the beautiful houses and works of art that his people make in their native forests.

Ransom is led to Oyarsa, who explains that there is an Oyarsa for each of the planets in the Solar System. However, the Oyarsa of Earth – which is known as Thulcandra, "the silent planet" – has become "bent", or evil, and has been restricted to Earth after "a great war," on the authority of Maleldil, the ruler of the universe. Ransom is ashamed at how little he can tell the Oyarsa of Malacandra about Earth, and how foolish he and other humans seem to Oyarsa.

While the two are talking, Devine and Weston are brought in, guarded by hrossa, because they have killed three members of that species. Weston does not believe that Oyarsa exists and he is incapable of conceiving that the Malacandrians are anything but ignorant natives, exploitable and expendable. This emerges in the course of a long speech in which Weston justifies his proposed invasion of Malacandra on "progressive" and evolutionary grounds. Weston's motives are shown to be more complex than profit: he is bent on expanding humanity through the universe, abandoning each planet and star system as its resources are exhausted and it becomes uninhabitable. In Ransom's attempts at translation, the brutality and crudity of Weston's ambitions are laid bare.

While acknowledging that Weston is acting out of a sense of duty to his species and does not share Devine's greed for gold, Oyarsa tells Weston and Devine that he cannot tolerate their disruptive presence on Malacandra. He directs them to leave the planet immediately, despite very unfavourable orbital conditions. Oyarsa offers Ransom the option of staying on Malacandra, but Ransom decides he does not belong there either. The three men voyage back to Earth in the spaceship, and their 90 days' worth of air and other supplies nearly run out before they arrive.

In the final chapter, Lewis introduces himself as a character into his own novel. He had written to Ransom enquiring whether he had come across the Latin word Oyarses, discovered in a mediaeval Neoplatonist work. This prompts Ransom to share his secret and the two resolve to hinder Weston from doing further evil in view of "the rapid march of [contemporary] events".

== Characters ==
- Dr Elwin Ransom – A professor of philology at a college of the University of Cambridge.
- Dr Weston – A thick-set physicist, ruthless and arrogant, who mocks "classics and history and such trash" in favour of the hard sciences.
- Dick Devine – Weston's accomplice who "was quite ready to laugh at Weston's solemn scientific idealism. He didn't give a damn, he said, for the future of the species or the meeting of two worlds."
- Hyoi – Ransom's first hross contact.
- Hnohra – An older hross who acts as Ransom's language teacher.
- Augray – A mountain-dwelling sorn.
- Kanakaberaka – A pfifltrigg who carves Ransom's portrait onto a stone at Meldilorn.
- Oyarsa – The spirit ruler of Malacandra whose demand to meet a human before allowing further exploration of his planet precipitates the kidnapping of Ransom.

== Hrossa, séroni, and pfifltriggi ==
On Malacandra there are three native species of reasoning hnau.

The hrossa (singular hross) resemble bipedal otters or seals, and they are somewhat taller and thinner than humans. Ransom finds them beautiful: "covered, face and all, with thick black animal hair, and whiskered like a cat ... glossy coat, liquid eye, sweet breath and whitest teeth". They live in the low river valleys (handramit in the speech of the eldila), which they travel by boat, and specialise in farming, fishing, and such performing arts as dancing and poetry. Their technical level is low, and they wear only pocketed loincloths. Their speech is characterised by adding an initial /h/ sound to the words in the planet's common vocabulary. Their sense of humour is "extravagant and fantastic".

The séroni (singular sorn; the plural is sometimes given as sorns) are thin, 15-foot-high (4.6 m) humanoids having coats of pale feathers and seven-fingered hands. They live in mountain caves of the high country (harandra in the speech of the eldila), though they often descend into the handramit where they raise giraffe-like livestock. They are the scholars and thinkers of Malacandra, specializing in science and abstract learning. Their technical level is high, and they design machinery, which is built by the pfifltriggi. Although they can write, they do not compose written works of history or fiction as they feel the hrossa are superior at it. Their sense of humour "seldom got beyond irony".

The pfifltriggi (singular pfifltrigg) have tapir-like heads and frog-like bodies; they lean their elbows on the ground when at rest, and sometimes when working with their hands. Their movements are quick and insectlike. They are the builders and technicians of Malacandra. They build houses and gadgets thought up by the séroni. They are miners who especially like to dig up "sun's blood" (gold) and other useful and beautiful minerals. Their sense of humour is "sharp and excelled in abuse".

Members of the three races do not believe any one of the races to be superior to the others; they acknowledge, rather, that no single race can do everything.

== Glossary ==
- Arbol – The Sun.
- Crah – The final section of a poem.
- Eldil, pl. eldila – Being of light, similar to a spirit.
- Field of Arbol – Solar System.
- Handra – Land or planet.
- Harandra – High earth; plateau.
- Handramit – Low earth; valley.
- Hlab – Language.
- Hluntheline – Long for, yearn for, desire (for the future).
- Hnakra, pl. hnéraki – A vicious aquatic beast hunted by the hrossa.
- Hnakrapunt, pl. hnakrapunti – Hnakra-slayer.
- Hnau – Rational creature.
- Honodraskrud – Ground-weed.
- Hressa Hlab – Language of the hrossa.
- Hressni – Female hrossa.
- Hross, pl. hrossa – One of three species of hnau on Malacandra.
- Malacandra – A compound noun, formed with the prefix Malac and the noun handra, referring to the fourth planet from the Sun; Mars.
- Maleldil – Ruler of the Oyéresu.
- Oyarsa, pl. Oyéresu – (Title) = Ruler of a planet, a higher-order eldil.
- Perelandra – A compound noun, formed with the prefix Perel and the noun handra; Venus.
- Pfifltrigg, pl. pfifltriggi – One of three species of hnau on Malacandra.
- Sorn, pl. séroni – One of three species of hnau on Malacandra.
- Surnibur – Language of the séroni.
- Thulcandra – A compound noun, formed with the prefix Thulc, meaning "silent", and handra; "Silent Planet" or Earth.
- Wondelone – Long for, yearn for, miss (from the past).

== Background ==
Lewis wrote Out of the Silent Planet during 1937 after a conversation with J. R. R. Tolkien in which both men lamented the state of contemporary fiction. They agreed that Lewis would write a space travel story and Tolkien would write a time travel story. In fact, Tolkien never completed his story, while Lewis went on to compose two others over the war years in Britain. These three books are now referred to as the Cosmic or Space Trilogy, or occasionally as The Ransom trilogy after the main character, Elwin Ransom.

Lewis was an early reader of H. G. Wells and had been given a copy of The First Men in the Moon as a Christmas present in 1908. Ransom makes dismissive references to Wells's conceptions in the course of the novel, but Lewis himself prefaced early editions of the novel with the disclaimer that "Certain slighting references to earlier stories of this type which will be found in the following pages have been put there for purely dramatic purposes. The author would be sorry if any reader supposed he was too stupid to have enjoyed Mr. H. G. Wells's fantasies or too ungrateful to acknowledge his debt to them." Another early work of space fiction which he later acknowledged was David Lindsay's A Voyage to Arcturus (1920).

But there were other speculative works in answer to which Out of the Silent Planet was written as a decided reaction. In both Olaf Stapledon's Last and First Men (1930) and an essay in J. B. S. Haldane's Possible Worlds (1927), Lewis detected what he termed Evolutionism, an amoral belief that humanity could perfect from itself a master race that would spread through the universe. Such was the ideology that Weston championed in his debate with Oyarsa, only to have it travestied by Ransom's translation of it into Malacandran.

In the end, very few of the novel's original reviewers even realised that Lewis's intent was to substitute theological values in place of Scientism, which he deplored. Noting this omission, he pointed out to one of his correspondents that "any amount of theology can now be smuggled into people’s minds under cover of romance without their knowing it". In the novel itself, Ransom proposes a similar but subtler approach in his letter to Lewis quoted in the postscript: "What we need for the moment is not so much a body of belief as a body of people familiarized with certain ideas. If we could even effect in one per cent of our readers a change-over from the conception of Space to the conception of Heaven, we should have made a beginning."

What Lewis actually offers as substitute views are a series of reversals. His Malacandra is in fact the planet Mars which, named after the Roman god of war, was once viewed astrologically as the influencer of self-assertion and disruption. However, in place of Wells's scenario in The War of the Worlds, in which the inhabitants of Mars come to Earth as invaders, Lewis portrays a world of different species living in harmony from which members of his own corrupted species are expelled as bringers of violence and exploitation. Again, the clock is turned back from the world view of the post-mediaeval Renaissance to that of the Renaissance of the 12th century with the novel's vision of the universe as "the field of Heaven" peopled by aetheric angels. It had been the aim of Lewis's scholastic study The Allegory of Love (1936) to revalidate the standpoint of the mediaeval literature flowing from that time and a reference to one of its key authors is introduced as the reason for Lewis to contact Ransom in the first place. In Lewis's study, the authors of the Platonic School of Chartres are presented as "pioneers of medieval allegorical poetry…For them, Nature was not opposed to Grace but, rather, an instrument of Grace in opposing the Unnatural", which is one of the transformative ideas with which the novel's readers are to be familiarized. Bernardus Silvestris's study of the creation underpins Oyarsa's discussion with Ransom in the novel.

== Weston's speech and its translation ==
The speech which Weston delivers at the book's climax (in Chapter 20), and Ransom's effort to render it into the language of Malacandra, demonstrates the gulf in cultural and moral perceptions between the planetary mind sets and may be said to make a sort of social criticism.

Weston's speech in English	Ransom's rendering into Malacandran, "which he felt to be rather unsatisfactory"
To you I may seem a vulgar robber, but I bear on my shoulders the destiny of the human race. Your tribal life with its stone-age weapons and bee-hive huts, its primitive coracles and elementary social structure, has nothing to compare with our civilization – with our science, medicine and law, our armies, our architecture, our commerce, and our transport system which is rapidly annihilating space and time. Our right to supersede you is the right of the higher over the lower.	Among us, Oyarsa, there is a kind of hnau who will take other hnau’s food – and things, when they are not looking. He says he is not an ordinary one of that kind. He says what he does now will make very different things happen to those of our people who are not yet born. He says that, among you, hnau of one kindred all live together and the hrossa have spears like those we used a very long time ago and your huts are small and round and your boats small and light like our old ones, and you only have one ruler. He says it is different with us. He says we know much. There is a thing happens in our world when the body of a living creature feels pains and becomes weak, and we sometimes know how to stop it. He says we have many bent people and we kill them or shut them in huts and that we have people for settling quarrels between the bent hnau about their huts and mates and things. He says we have many ways for the hnau of one land to kill those of another and some are trained to do it. He says we build very big and strong huts of stones and other things – like the pfifltriggi. And he says we can exchange many things among ourselves and can carry heavy weights very quickly a long way. Because of all this, he says it would not be the act of a bent hnau if our people killed all your people.
Life is greater than any system of morality; her claims are absolute. It is not by tribal taboos and copy-book maxims that she has pursued her relentless march from the amoeba to man and from man to civilization.	He says that living creatures are stronger than the question whether an act is bent or good – no, that cannot be right – he says it is better to be alive and bent than to be dead – no – he says, he says – I cannot say what he says, Oyarsa, in your language. But he goes on to say that the only good thing is that there should be very many creatures alive. He says there were many other animals before the first men and the later ones were better than the earlier ones; but he says the animals were not born because of what is said to the young about bent and good action by their elders. And he says these animals did not feel any pity.
She has ruthlessly broken down all obstacles and liquidated all failures and to-day in her highest form – civilised man – and in me as his representative, she presses forward to that interplanetary leap which will, perhaps, place her for ever beyond the reach of death.	He says that these animals learned to do many difficult things, except those who could not; and those ones died and the other animals did not pity them. And he says the best animal now is the kind of man who makes the big huts and carries the heavy weights and does all the other things I told you about; and he is one of these and he says that if the others all knew what he was doing they would be pleased. He says that if he could kill you all and bring our people to live in Malacandra, then they might be able to go on living here after something had gone wrong with our world. And then if something went wrong with Malacandra they might go and kill all the hnau in another world. And then another – and so they would never die out.
It is in her right, the right, or, if you will, the might of Life herself, that I am prepared without flinching to plant the flag of man on the soil of Malacandra: to march on, step by step, superseding, where necessary, the lower forms of life that we find, claiming planet after planet, system after system, till our posterity – whatever strange form and yet unguessed mentality they might have assumed – dwell in the universe wherever the universe is habitable.	He says that because of this it would not be a bent action – or else, he says, it would be a possible action – for him to kill you all and bring us here. He says he would feel no pity. He is saying again that perhaps they would be able to keep moving from one world to another and wherever they came they would kill everyone. I think he is now talking about worlds that go round other suns. He wants the creatures born from us to be in as many places as they can. He says does not know what kind of creatures they will be.
I may fall, but while I live I will not, with such a key in my hand, consent to close the gates of the future on my race. What lies in that future, beyond our present ken, passes imagination to conceive: it is enough for me that there is a Beyond.	He is saying that he will not stop trying to do all this unless you kill him. And he says that though he doesn’t know what will happen to the creatures sprung from us, he wants it to happen very much.

== Publication history ==
(Information has been gleaned from the Library of Congress, the Internet Speculative Fiction Database, and WorldCat.)

Year	Country	Publisher	ISBN (available occasionally)	Binding	Notes
1938	UK	John Lane, The Bodley Head		Hardcover	1st edition. First published 1 April 1938. John Lane issued many reprints.
1943	UK	The Macmillan Company		Hardcover	
1946	USA	Macmillan			
1948	Austria	Amandus-Ed.		Hardcover	Title: Der verstummte Planet: Roman, trans. by Else von Juhàsz.
1949	USA	Avon		Paperback	Avon Reprint Edition. On cover: "Complete and unabridged." On cover: "Reads like the best of Merritt and Burroughs – D. A. Wollheim"; Colorful cover art, by Ann Cantor, shows Ransom in a boat with Hyoi and two séroni on the shore.
1949	Spain	José Janés Editor			Title: Fuga a los Espacio ("Space Flight"), trans. by Manuel Bosch Barrett. Series: Cosmic Trilogy #1.
1952	UK	Pan Books		Paperback	First Pan paperback printing. Second Pan paperback printing appeared in 1955. Cover art by George Woodman.
1952	France	Hachette		Paperback	Title: Le silence de la Terre ("The Silence of Earth"); trans. by Marguerite Faguer. Series: Le Rayon Fantastique #12. Colorful cover illustration, possibly by Christian Broutin, shows a man in middle distance, a boat on water to his right, twisting mountains in the background, a twisted tree to the left, and a green sky with wispy white clouds.
1955	Sweden	FA-Press			Title: Utflykt från tyst planet ("Flight Out of Silent Planet"); trans. by Karin Hartman and Erik Egberg. Cover art by Cliff Nielsen shows a grenade-like spaceship, with a man preparing to exit from it, landing on a Mars that is more greenish than red.
1956	USA	Avon		Paperback	Cover art by Everett Kinstler shows a rocket and Ransom, distraught, looking over his shoulder at an enormous eye in the sky, all against a red background.
1958	Germany	Rowohlt Verlag		Paperback	Title: Jenseits des Schweigenden Sterns; trans. by Ernst Sander. 1st German ed. Series: rororo Taschenbuch, Ausg. 289. Cover illustration shows a green planet.
1960	USA	Avon		Paperback	3rd Avon printing. Cover artist, uncredited, appears signed as Suss or Siess.
1960	UK	Pan Books		Paperback	Great Pan "New Edition" 1960. The three previous printings in Pan were 1952, 1955 and 1956. On cover: "A strikingly original story of man's leap into space – and what he finds there." Cover art, reminiscent of the work of Richard M. Powers, shows what might be two séroni, one with Ransom on his back; or possibly eldil.
1960	Netherlands	Ten Have		Paperback	Title: Ver van de zwijgende planeet, trans. H. C. Weiland.
1965	USA	Macmillan		Paperback	1st pbk. ed. Issued for a juvenile audience. Publisher's summary: ... Dr. Ransom is kidnapped and spirited by spaceship to the mysterious red planet of Malandra [sic]. He escapes and goes on the run, jeopardizing both his chances of ever returning to Earth and his very life... Lewis modeled Dr. Ransom after his dear friend J.R.R. Tolkien...
1965	USA	Macmillan	ISBN 0-02-086880-4	Paperback	160 pp. Cover art by Bernard Symancyk.
1966		Oxford		Paperback	
1966	UK	Longmans		Paperback.	Introduction and notes by David Elloway. Series: Heritage of literature series, Section B, no. 87.
1967	France	OPTA		Hardcover omnibus.	Trilogy title: Le silence de la Terre / Voyage à Vénus / Cette hideuse puissance. Translated by Marguerite Faguer and Frank Straschitz. Numbered and limited printing of 4000+150 copies. Cloth cover in magenta with illustration of spaceship (or meteor) in goldenrod color.
1971	UK	The Bodley Head	ISBN 0-370-00536-8 and ISBN 978-0-370-00536-2	Hardcover	Stated Eleventh Impression.
1977	USA	Macmillan	ISBN 0-02-086880-4 ; and ISBN 978-0-02-086880-4	Paperback	(Published as Space trilogy, according to WorldCat.)
1984	Portugal	Publicações Europa-America			Title: Para Além do Planeta Silencioso; trans. by Maria Luísa Gonçalves dos Santos. Series: Livros de Bolso, série Ficção Científica #80
1984	USA	Macmillan	ISBN 0-025-70790-6	Hardcover	
1988	USA	Megaforce Worldwide/Atlantic		Sound recording (analog, 33 1/3 rpm, stereo.)	
1990	USA	Macmillan	ISBN 978-0-02-570795-5	Hardcover	Publisher's description: A philologist is kidnapped and taken via space-ship from England to Malacandra where he escapes and goes on the run.
1996		Scribner Paperback Fiction	ISBN 0-684-82380-2 and ISBN 978-0-684-82380-5	Paperback	First Scribner Paperback Fiction edition. Cover design by Kevin Mohlenkamp.
1996	USA	Scribner Classics	ISBN 0-684-83364-6 and 978-0-684-83364-4	Hardcover	Cover art by Kinuko Y. Craft. Reprinted often.
1998	USA	G.K. Hall & Company	ISBN 0-7838-0411-3 and ISBN 978-0-7838-0411-8	Hardcover	Published December 1998. Large-print edition.
2000	UK	Voyager / HarperCollins	ISBN 0-00-628165-6 and 978-0-00-628165-8	Trade paperback	Published June 2000. Colorful cover art by Kinuko Craft shows Mars with pink foliage and teal river.
2002	Netherlands	Kok	ISBN 9789043504089	Paperback	Title: Malacandra, subtitle: Ver van de zwijgende planeet. trans. by A.L. Smilde.
2003	USA	Simon & Schuster	ISBN 0-7432-3490-1	Paperback	Issued 17 March 2003.
2005	Turkey	Kabalcı Yayınevi	ISBN 9789759970154	Paperback	Published July 2005. Named "Sessiz Gezegenin Dışında"
2005	UK	Voyager	ISBN 0-00-715715-0 and 978-0-00-715715-0	Trade paperback	Published December 2005. Cover art by Cliff Nielsen same as 1955 edition above.
2008	France	Éditions Gallimard	ISBN 9782070346127		Title: Au-delà de la planète silencieuse, trans. by Maurice Le Péchoux. Cover illustration by Emmanuel Malin.
2010	Ukraine	Видавництво Свічадо (Vydavnyctvo Svichado)	ISBN 9789663953151	Hardcover	Title: За межі мовчазної планети. Переландра (Za mezhi movchaznoyi planety. Perelandra), trans. by A. Maslyukh.
2012	USA	HarperCollins	ISBN 9780062197030	Electronic Book	EPub Edition
2022	USA Latinamerica	Grupo Nelson (HarperCollins)	ISBN 1400232171	Paperback	Title: Más allá del planeta silencioso, trans. by Elvio E. Gandolfo. cover illustration by Setelee
