= Religion in America =

Religion in America or American religion may refer to:

== Religion ==
- Religion in North America
  - Religion in the United States
    - American civil religion, a sociological theory that a nonsectarian civil religion exists within the United States with sacred symbols drawn from the national history of the United States
    - Religion of Black Americans, the religious and spiritual practices of African Americans
- Native American religions, the indigenous spiritual practices of the Indigenous peoples of the Americas
  - Mesoamerican religion, a group of indigenous religions of Mesoamerica that were prevalent in the pre-Columbian era
- Religion in Latin America
  - Religion in Central America
  - Religion in South America
- African diaspora religions, also known as Afro-American religions, a number of related beliefs that developed in the Americas in various areas of the Caribbean, Latin America, and the Southern United States

== Literature ==
- Journal of the American Academy of Religion, an American academic journal
- Encyclopedia of American Religions, a 1978 book by J. Gordon Melton
- Religion and American Culture, an American academic journal
- The American Religion, a 1992 book by Harold Bloom
- America's Religions, a 2002 book by Peter Williams

== Other uses ==
- American Academy of Religion, an American learned society and professional association
- National Museum of American Religion, an American museum
- "An American Religion (FSF)", a song by the Wonder Years from their 2013 album The Greatest Generation
