= Anxiety of influence =

Concept in literary criticism

Anxiety of influence is a concept in literary criticism articulated by Harold Bloom in 1973, in his book The Anxiety of Influence: A Theory of Poetry. It refers to the psychological struggle of aspiring authors to overcome the anxiety posed by the influence of their literary antecedents.

== Theory ==
The theory of anxiety of influence is a theory applied principally to early nineteenth century romantic poetry. Its author, Harold Bloom, maintains that the theory has general applicability to the study of literary tradition, ranging from Homer and the Bible to Thomas Pynchon and Anne Carson in the 20th and 21st century. It is based primarily on Bloom's belief that there is no such thing as an original poem, that every new composition is simply a misreading or misinterpretation of an earlier poem and that influence is unavoidable and inescapable; all writers inevitably, to some degree, adopt, manipulate or alter and assimilate certain aspects of the content or subject matter, literary style or form from their predecessors. To illustrate his point, Bloom quotes Oscar Wilde, noting that:

"Influence is simply transference of personality, a mode of giving away what is most precious to one's self, and its exercise produces a sense, and, it may be, a reality of loss. Every disciple takes away something from his master."

Contrary to universally held beliefs that the literary influence of precursors can provide a purely benevolent and inspirational platform for aspiring writers, Bloom credits this influence also with the opposite effect. He contends that it can prove detrimental, that this influence instills in young writers a type of unease, apprehension, or anxiety as they psychologically struggle against past literary forebears to create something definitive and original and achieve literary recognition and success. Bloom equates this struggle to the Freudian family drama; particularly to the Oedipus complex and relationship of son to father, where the emerging writer is cast as the 'son' in a battle against the 'father'; a literary precursor. Bloom claims that this forces poets or authors into a type of 'creative misprision'; where they must distort the works of their literary masters in an attempt to create something revolutionary and innovative. The authors who triumph over this struggle are deemed 'strong', with some even receiving acclaim to the extent where the contemporary has the potential to transcend time, with some literary predecessors being read in terms of their contemporary successor. In contrast, writers who cannot prevail over this anxiety of influence are deemed 'weak', with their works regarded as markedly derivative and reminiscent of the works of earlier literary masters. Some great poets in which Bloom draws upon, who have overcome this anxiety of influence include Wordsworth, Percy Bysshe Shelley and Wallace Stevens.

== Effects on literature ==
In order to determine the effects of this theory on literature, Bloom has established the six "revisionary ratios", which are occasionally based on the model of Freud's defense mechanisms. These ratios show the developmental stages of anxiety of influence in relation to the ways a poet or author misreads and deforms the work of a literary precursor in the composition of a literary text.

- Clinamen – Bloom defines this as "poetic misreading or misprision proper". The author makes a swerve away from a precursor, alluding to the proposition that the original work was only precise and accurate up until a particular end; at which point, the successive author makes the corrective motion.
- Tessera – Bloom defines this as "completion and antithesis". The author elaborates upon a precursor's work, maintaining the precursor's terms and ideas but constituting them in another sense, with the implication that the predecessor failed to take the argument far enough in the first instance
- Kenosis – Bloom defines this as a "breaking device similar to the defence mechanisms our psyches employ against repetition compulsions". The author seeks a state of discontinuity, in the act of isolating themself from the influence of the precursor
- Daemonization – Bloom defines this as a "movement towards a personalised Counter-Sublime, in reaction to the precursor's Sublime". The author manipulates an apparent power of a precursor that they believe is superior to the precursor in an effort to dismiss the originality of the predecessor's work and perpetuate the greatness of their own.
- Askesis – Bloom defines this as a "movement of self-purgation which intends the attainment of a state of solitude". In this process, the author diminishes both his own and his precursor's achievements, purging themself of all remnants of influence, with a rationale for independent, individual success and achievement.
- Apophrades – Bloom defines this as the "return of the dead". The author is encumbered by his previous state of solitude and holds his work open for inspection with that of his predecessors. Instead of proving detrimental to the author, this instead has the effect of the successor overpowering the predecessor, with the predecessor's work being read in terms of the successor's work.

== See also ==
- Covering cherub
- Apprentice complex
- Anxiety of authorship
