= Apprentice complex =

Concept in psychodynamic psychology

The apprentice complex is a psychodynamic constellation whereby a boy or youth resolves the Oedipus complex by an identification with his father, or father figure, as someone from whom to learn the future secrets of masculinity.

The term was introduced by Otto Fenichel in 1946 and has since been developed by postmodern writers on the construction of masculinity.

== Psychoanalytic views ==
Fenichel considered that the apprentice complex offered a ready mode of enjoying dependence under a guise of future independence – temporary submission to the father's authority offering a means to becoming oneself a male in time. Always ambivalent in that the ultimate goal is to replace the father, the complex may disguise a powerful degree of hostility and was open to several forms of pathological distortion. If meant by a paternal threat, the complex may regress to a passive identification with the mother.

The apprentice complex also appears as a facet of therapeutic training, in an idealisation of the training therapist as the one who knows, which then requires working through.

== Cultural applications ==
- Daniel Defoe, with his multiplicity of careers, his shifting political allegiances, and his prolific use of irony and masks in his writing, has been seen as a lifelong example of the apprentice complex.
- The intensity of mother-attachment in Hindu youth has been seen as producing an apprentice complex-style "identification through submission" to their fathers, as a compensatory force.

== See also ==
- Anxiety of influence
- Covering cherub
- Homosociality
- Mimesis
- Moratorium
- Puer aeternus
- The Imaginary
