= Reputation of William Shakespeare =

The Chandos portrait, commonly assumed to depict William Shakespeare, "the man who of all Modern, and perhaps Ancient Poets, had the largest and most comprehensive soul" (John Dryden, 1668), "our myriad-minded Shakespeare" (S. T. Coleridge, 1817).

In his own time, William Shakespeare (1564–1616) was rated as merely one among many talented playwrights and poets, but since the late 17th century has been considered the supreme playwright and poet of the English language.

In the 18th century, editors and critics of the plays, disdaining the showiness and melodrama of Shakespearean stage representation, began to focus on Shakespeare as a dramatic poet, to be studied on the printed page rather than in the theatre. The rift between Shakespeare on the stage and Shakespeare on the page was at its widest in the early 19th century, at a time when both forms of Shakespeare were hitting peaks of fame and popularity: theatrical Shakespeare was successful spectacle and melodrama for the masses, while book or closet drama Shakespeare was being elevated by the reverential commentary of the Romantics into unique poetic genius, prophet, and bard.

Before the Romantics, Shakespeare was simply the most admired of all dramatic poets, especially for his insight into human nature and his realism, but Romantic critics such as Samuel Taylor Coleridge refactored him into an object of almost religious adoration, George Bernard Shaw coining the term "bardolatry" to describe it.

To the later 19th century, Shakespeare became in addition an emblem of national pride, the crown jewel of English culture, and a "rallying-sign", as Thomas Carlyle wrote in 1841, for the whole British Empire.

== 17th century ==
=== Jacobean and Caroline ===
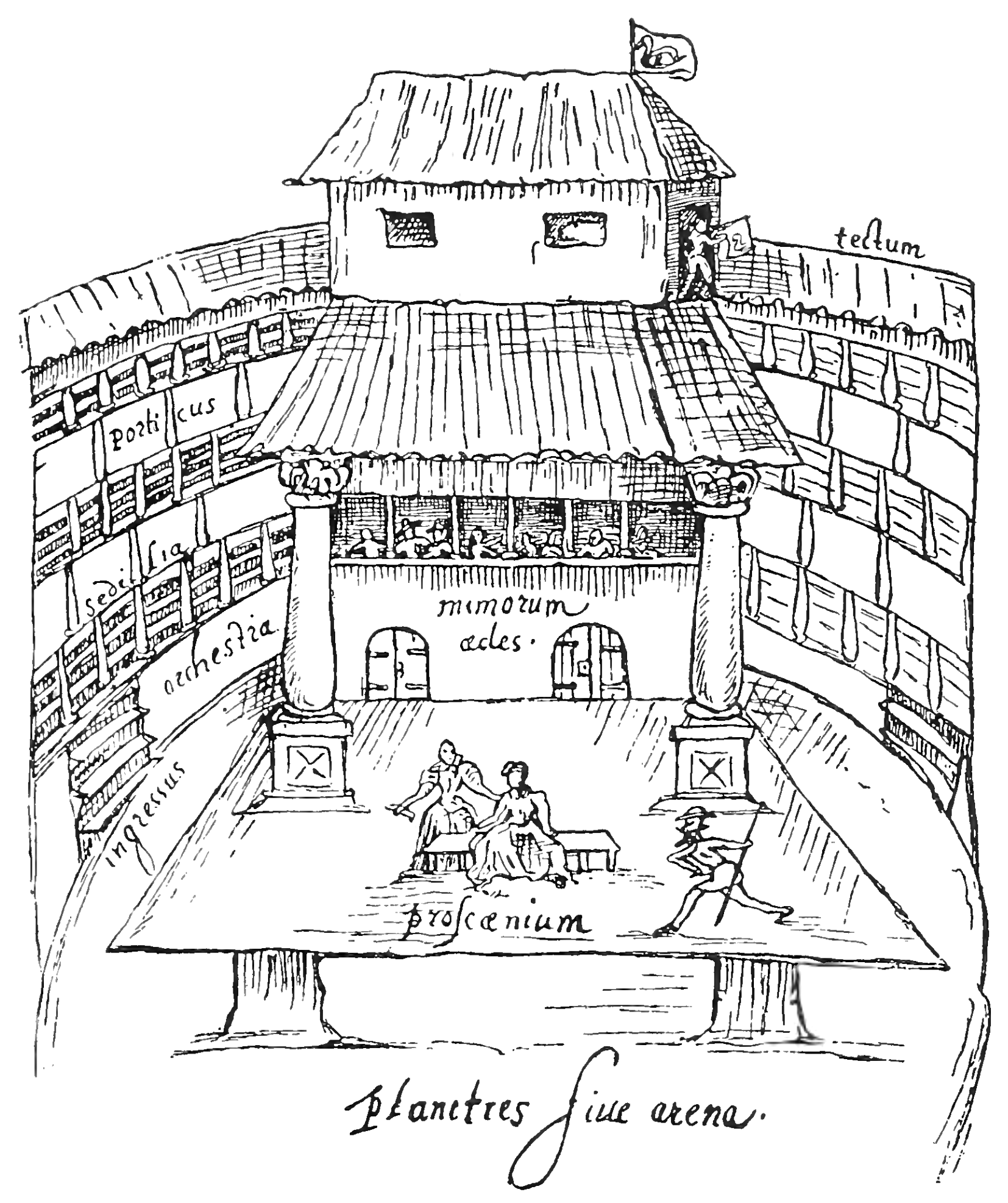
A 1596 sketch of a performance in progress on the platform or apron stage of the typical circular Elizabethan open-roof playhouse The Swan.

It is difficult to assess Shakespeare's reputation in his own lifetime and shortly after. England had little modern literature before the 1570s, and detailed critical commentaries on modern authors did not begin to appear until the reign of Charles I. The facts about his reputation can be surmised from fragmentary evidence. He was included in some contemporary lists of leading poets, but he seems to have lacked the stature of the aristocratic Philip Sidney, who became a cult figure due to his death in battle at a young age, or of Edmund Spenser. Shakespeare's poems were reprinted far more frequently than his plays; but Shakespeare's plays were written for performance by his own company, and because no law prevented rival companies from using the plays, Shakespeare's troupe took steps to prevent his plays from being printed. That many of his plays were pirated suggests his popularity in the book market, and the regular patronage of his company by the court, culminating in 1603 when James I turned it into the "King's Men," suggests his popularity among higher stations of society. Modern plays (as opposed to those in Latin and Greek) were considered ephemeral and even somewhat disreputable entertainments by some contemporaries. Some of Shakespeare's plays, particularly the history plays, were reprinted frequently in cheap quarto (i.e. pamphlet) form; others took decades to reach a 3rd edition.

After Ben Jonson pioneered the canonisation of modern plays by printing his own works in folio (the luxury book format) in 1616, Shakespeare was the next playwright to be honoured by a folio collection, in 1623. That this folio went into another edition within 9 years indicates he was held in unusually high regard for a playwright. The dedicatory poems by Ben Jonson and John Milton in the 2nd folio were the first to suggest Shakespeare was the supreme English poet of his age. These expensive reading editions are the first visible sign of a rift between Shakespeare on the stage and Shakespeare for readers, a rift that was to widen over the next two centuries. In his 1630 work 'Timber' or 'Discoveries', Ben Jonson praised the speed and ease with which Shakespeare wrote his plays as well as his contemporary's honesty and gentleness towards others.

=== Interregnum and Restoration ===
During the Interregnum (1642–1660), all public stage performances were banned by the Puritan rulers. Though denied the use of the stage, costumes and scenery, actors still managed to ply their trade by performing "drolls" or short pieces of larger plays that usually ended with some type of jig. Shakespeare was among the many playwrights whose works were plundered for these scenes. Among the most common scenes were Bottom's scenes from A Midsummer Night's Dream and the gravedigger's scene from Hamlet. When the theatres opened again in 1660 after this uniquely long and sharp break in British theatrical history, two newly licensed London theatre companies, the Duke's and the King's Company, started business with a scramble for performance rights to old plays. Shakespeare, Ben Jonson, and the Beaumont and Fletcher team were among the most valuable properties and remained popular after Restoration playwriting had gained momentum.

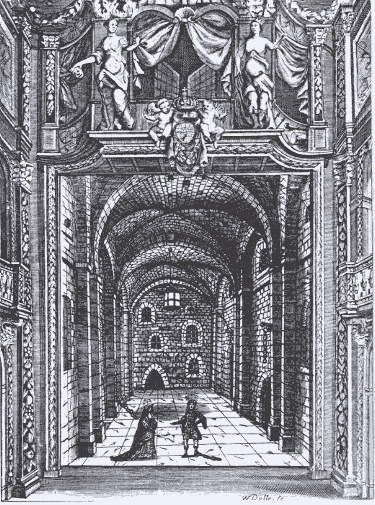
The Restoration playhouses had elaborate scenery. They retained a shortened version of the apron stage for actor/audience contact, although it is not visible in this picture (the artist is standing on it).

In the elaborate Restoration London playhouses, designed by Christopher Wren, Shakespeare's plays were staged with music, dancing, thunder, lightning, wave machines, and fireworks. The texts were "reformed" and "improved" for the stage. A notorious example is Irish poet Nahum Tate's happy-ending King Lear (1681) (which held the stage until 1838), while The Tempest was turned into an opera replete with special effects by William Davenant. In fact, as the director of the Duke's Company, Davenant was legally obliged to reform and modernize Shakespeare's plays before performing them, an ad hoc ruling by the Lord Chamberlain in the battle for performance rights which "sheds an interesting light on the many 20th-century denunciations of Davenant for his adaptations". The modern view of the Restoration stage as the epitome of Shakespeare abuse and bad taste has been shown by Hume to be exaggerated, and both scenery and adaptation became more reckless in the 18th and 19th centuries.

The incomplete Restoration stage records suggest Shakespeare, although always a major repertory author, was bested in the 1660–1700 period by the phenomenal popularity of Beaumont and Fletcher. "Their plays are now the most pleasant and frequent entertainments of the stage", reported fellow playwright John Dryden in 1668, "two of theirs being acted through the year for one of Shakespeare's or Jonson's." In the early 18th century, however, Shakespeare took over the lead on the London stage from Beaumont and Fletcher, never to relinquish it again.

By contrast to the stage history, in literary criticism there was no lag time, no temporary preference for other dramatists: Shakespeare had a unique position at least from the Restoration in 1660 and onwards. While Shakespeare did not follow the unbending French neo-classical "rules" for the drama and the three classical unities of time, place, and action, those strict rules had never caught on in England, and their sole zealous proponent, Thomas Rymer, was hardly ever mentioned by influential writers except as an example of narrow dogmatism. Dryden, for example, argued in his influential Essay of Dramatick Poesie (1668) – the same essay in which he noted that Shakespeare's plays were performed only half as often as those of Beaumont and Fletcher – for Shakespeare's artistic superiority. Though Shakespeare does not follow the dramatic conventions, Dryden wrote, Ben Jonson does, and as a result Jonson lands in a distant second place to "the incomparable Shakespeare."

== 18th century ==
=== Britain ===
In the 18th century, Shakespeare dominated the London stage, while Shakespeare productions turned increasingly into the creation of star turns for star actors. After the Licensing Act 1737, a quarter of plays performed were by Shakespeare, and on at least two occasions rival London playhouses staged the very same Shakespeare play at the same time (Romeo and Juliet in 1755 and King Lear the next year) and still commanded audiences. This occasion was a striking example of the growing prominence of Shakespeare stars in the theatrical culture, the big attraction being the competition and rivalry between the male leads at Covent Garden and Drury Lane, Spranger Barry and David Garrick. There appear to have been no issues with Barry and Garrick, in their late thirties, playing adolescent Romeo one season and geriatric King Lear the next. In September 1769 Garrick staged a major Shakespeare Jubilee in Stratford-upon-Avon, which was a major influence on the rise of bardolatry. It was at the Shakespeare Jubilee that Garrick thanked the Shakespeare Ladies Club for saving Shakespeare from obscurity: "It was You Ladies that restor'd Shakespeare to the Stage you form'd yourselves into a Society to protect his Fame, and Erected a Monument to his and your own honour in Westminster Abbey."

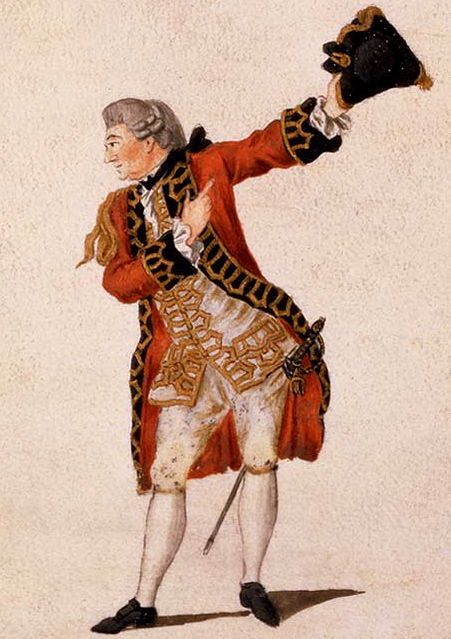
David Garrick as Benedick in Much Ado About Nothing, 1770.

As performance playscripts diverged increasingly from their originals, the publication of texts intended for reading developed rapidly in the opposite direction, with the invention of textual criticism and an emphasis on fidelity to Shakespeare's original words. The texts that are being read and performed today were largely settled in the 18th century. Nahum Tate and Nathaniel Lee had already prepared editions and performed scene divisions in the late 17th century, and Nicholas Rowe's edition of 1709 is considered the first truly scholarly text for the plays. It was followed by many good 18th century editions, crowned by Edmund Malone's landmark Variorum Edition, which was published posthumously in 1821 and remains the basis of modern editions. These collected editions were meant for reading, not staging; Rowe's 1709 edition was, compared to the old folios, a light pocketbook. Shakespeare criticism also increasingly spoke to readers, rather than to theatre audiences.

The only aspects of Shakespeare's plays that were consistently disliked and singled out for criticism in the 18th century were the puns ("clenches") and the "low" (sexual) allusions. While a few editors, notably Alexander Pope, attempted to gloss over or remove the puns and the double entendres, this was quickly reversed, and by mid-century the puns and sexual humour were (with only a few exceptions, notably Thomas Bowdler) restored permanently.

Dryden's sentiments about Shakespeare's imagination and capacity for painting "nature" were echoed in the 18th century by, for example, Joseph Addison ("Among the English, Shakespeare has incomparably excelled all others"), Alexander Pope ("every single character in Shakespeare is as much an Individual as those in Life itself"), and Samuel Johnson (who scornfully dismissed Voltaire's and Rhymer's neoclassical Shakespeare criticism as "the petty cavils of petty minds"). The long-lived belief that the Romantics were the first generation to truly appreciate Shakespeare and to prefer him to Ben Jonson is contradicted by praise from writers throughout the 18th century. Ideas about Shakespeare that many people think of as typically post-Romantic were frequently expressed in the 18th and even in the 17th century: he was described as a genius who needed no learning, as deeply original, and as creating uniquely "real" and individual characters (see Timeline of Shakespeare criticism). To compare Shakespeare and his well-educated contemporary Ben Jonson was a popular exercise at this time, a comparison that was invariably complimentary to Shakespeare. It functioned to highlight the special qualities of both writers, and it especially powered the assertion that natural genius trumps rules, that "there is always an appeal open from criticism to nature" (Samuel Johnson).

Opinion of Shakespeare was briefly shaped in the 1790s by the "discovery" of the Shakespeare Papers by William Henry Ireland. Ireland claimed to have found in a trunk a goldmine of lost documents of Shakespeare's including two plays, Vortigern and Rowena and Henry II. These documents appeared to demonstrate a number of unknown facts about Shakespeare that shaped opinion of his works, including a Profession of Faith demonstrating Shakespeare was a Protestant and that he had an illegitimate child. Although there were many believers in the provenance of the Papers, they soon came under fierce attack from scholars who pointed out their numerous inaccuracies. Vortigern had only one performance at the Drury Lane Theatre before Ireland admitted he had forged the documents and written the plays himself.

=== In Germany ===
English actors started visiting the Holy Roman Empire in the late 16th century to work as "fiddlers, singers and jugglers", and through them the work of Shakespeare had first become known in the Reich. In 1601, in the Free City of Danzig (modern Gdańsk, Poland), which had a large English merchant colony living within its walls, a company of English actors arrived to put on plays by Shakespeare. By 1610, the actors were performing Shakespeare in German as his plays had become popular in Danzig. Some of Shakespeare's work was performed in continental Europe during the 17th century, but it was not until the mid-18th century that it became widely known. In Germany Lessing compared Shakespeare to German folk literature. In France, the Aristotelian rules were rigidly obeyed, and in Germany, a land where French cultural influence was very strong (German elites preferred to speak French rather than German in the 18th century), the Francophile German theatre critics had long denounced Shakespeare's work as a "jumble" that violated all the Aristotelian rules.

As a part of an effort to get the German public to take Shakespeare more seriously, Johann Wolfgang von Goethe organised a Shakespeare jubilee in Frankfurt in 1771, stating in a speech on 14 October 1771 that the dramatist had shown that the Aristotelian unities were "as oppressive as a prison" and were "burdensome fetters on our imagination". Goethe praised Shakespeare for liberating his mind from the rigid Aristotelian rules, saying: "I jumped into the free air, and suddenly felt I had hands and feet...Shakespeare, my friend, if you were with us today, I could only live with you". Herder likewise proclaimed that reading Shakespeare's work opens "leaves from the book of events, of providence, of the world, blowing in the sands of time".

This claim that Shakespeare's work breaks through all creative boundaries to reveal a chaotic, teeming, contradictory world became characteristic of Romantic criticism, later expressed by Victor Hugo in the preface to his play Cromwell, in which he lauded Shakespeare as an artist of the grotesque, a genre in which the tragic, absurd, trivial and serious were inseparably intertwined. In 1995, the American journalist Stephen Kinzer writing in The New York Times observed: "Shakespeare is an all-but-guaranteed success in Germany, where his work has enjoyed immense popularity for more than 200 years. By some estimates, Shakespeare's plays are performed more frequently in Germany than anywhere else in the world, not excluding his native England. The market for his work, both in English and in German translation, seems inexhaustible." The German critic Ernst Osterkamp wrote: "Shakespeare's importance to German literature cannot be compared with that of any other writer of the post-antiquity period. Neither Dante or Cervantes, neither Moliere or Ibsen have even approached his influence here. With the passage of time, Shakespeare has virtually become one of Germany's national authors."

=== In Russia ===
Shakespeare, as far as can be established, never went any farther from Stratford-upon-Avon than London, but he made a reference to the visit of Russian diplomats from the court of Tsar Ivan the Terrible to the court of Elizabeth I in Love's Labour's Lost in which the French aristocrats dress up as Russians and make fools of themselves. Shakespeare was first translated into Russian by Alexander Sumarokov, who called Shakespeare an "inspired barbarian", who wrote of the Bard of Avon that in his plays "there is much that is bad and exceedingly good". In 1786, Shakespeare's reputation in Russia was greatly enhanced when the Empress Catherine the Great translated a French version of The Merry Wives of Windsor into Russian (Catherine did not know English) and had it staged in St. Petersburg. Shortly afterwards, Catherine translated Timon of Athens from French into Russian. The patronage of Catherine made Shakespeare an eminently respectable author in Russia, but his plays were rarely performed until the 19th century, and instead he was widely read.

=== In France ===
Shakespeare and his works began to circulate in France from the beginning of the 18th century. Until this moment, the most admired English poets were Alexander Pope, John Milton, James Thomson and Thomas Gray, and their texts had already been translated into French.

In the first half of the century, French intellectuals who had visited or sojourned in England for a period of time and, therefore, had had the opportunity to see theatrical representations of English plays, began to express their opinions and judgments on Shakespeare and his theatre.

Voltaire was a prominent figure in this debate. In Essai sur la poésie épique (1728), he declared himself to be an admirer of the English theatre, especially of its tragedies, which he considered to be superior to all the other genres brought to the English stage. Voltaire's appreciation for the English theatre was so sincere that he tried to import some of its characteristics into France. The adoption of such features was not immediate or easy. In Discours sur la tragédie (1731), Voltaire had analysed all the rules that had to be categorically respected in French theatres, all the events that could be represented and those that were absolutely forbidden. As a result, delicatesse, bienséance, and coutume dominated the French plays, and they constituted an obstacle to the introduction of any innovation. Such mutations were scarcely appreciated by the playwrights, actors and audiences. Voltaire showed his will to partly abandon such conventions, mainly because they were an impediment for the realisation of some scenes he was working on, firstly the death of Julius Caesar. The main impediment for this scene was the rule that in French tragedies, characters could commit suicide, but not murder. Voltaire fought to change this convention, supporting his thesis with examples from Ancient Greek theatre and the contemporary English theatre, where assassinations were regularly represented on stage. However, Voltaire also stated that English tragedies could turn into "a place of carnage". What he wanted to achieve was a compromise between tradition and innovation.

Eventually, innovations infiltrated into French theatre and when Voltaire presented La Mort de Cèsar to his audience in 1743, he was able to represent Caesar's death as he had originally imagined it.

Voltaire also lamented that no one among his fellow countrymen had tried to translate Shakespeare. He personally translated the speech of Brutus in Julius Caesar, becoming the first Frenchman to translate a passage from a Shakespearean play. His translation was included in Discours sur la tragedie, published in 1730. Some years later, he freely translated Hamlet's "To be, or not to be" monologue, which was published in Les Lettres philosophiques (1734). Shakespeare's popularity steadily increased during the century and others tested themselves with translating the Bard. The appearance of numerous translations points out a change in the taste of French playwrights and audiences.

In 1746 Pierre-Antoine de La Place published eight volumes containing summaries of every Shakespearean play and partial translations of some of them. Between 1776 and 1782 Pierre Letourner translated the complete corpus of Shakespeare's plays. His work also included comments on Shakespeare, particularly on his ability to depict human emotions and make characters talk in a language close to that used in everyday life. Letourner's translations do not lack errors, but his work was fundamental in spreading the knowledge of Shakespeare and the English theatre in France.

=== In Italy ===
Shakespeare remained almost unknown in Italy until the beginning of the 18th century. The most translated and admired English poets were Alexander Pope, John Milton, Thomas Gray and James Thomson. The knowledge of Shakespeare spread in the peninsula in two different ways. On one hand, Italian intellectuals who sojourned for a period of time in England had the possibility to witness theatrical representations and to write about their experiences; their texts, then, travelled back to Italy. On the other hand, many English people travelled to Italy in the 18th century, since it was one of the many destinations on the Grand Tour. The occasions for interactions between English and Italian people were numerous. Moreover, English people who migrated or were banished from England, often chose Italy as their new home. However, many French translations and adaptations of Shakespearean plays began to circulate in Europe in this period, and the majority of Italian writers started to read Shakespeare in French. Few people knew English and dictionaries were not widely available. For Italians, their first approach towards English plays was often through French renditions and, even though they presented substantial differences from the originals, they introduced the knowledge of English theatre and its rules into Italy. One of the most famous and most-read French adaptations was La mort de César by Voltaire, based on Julius Caesar by Shakespeare. Shakespearean plays began to be staged in Italian theatres in the second half of the century, and they were nearly always adaptations or rewrites.

In 1705, Apostolo Zeno wrote Ambleto, which was staged in Venice the following year. Ambleto was not a translation of Hamlet, not even an adaptation; the only similarity with Hamlet was its source of inspiration, and it has now been verified that the author did not know Shakespeare. The production was so successful that it was brought to the stage of the Haymarket Theatre in London in 1712. The play was staged again in Italy in 1750, but it had not been influenced by the Shakespearean Hamlet. As a matter of fact, it was identical to the first version of 1706. This is a signal of how there was no real interest for the English theatre and its characteristics in Italy, yet.

The first Italian melodrama which was inspired by a tragedy by Shakespeare dates to 1789: Amleto by Gimbattista Zanchi. He, however, worked with the help of a French rendition. It is possible, then, that he did not know the original version of the tragedy. The only melodrama which took inspiration directly from an original work by Shakespeare was Rosalinda (1744) by Paolo Rolli. His source of inspiration was As you like it and it was the only theatrical production that took inspiration from a Shakespearean comedy instead of a tragedy.

From the beginning of the century, however, some intellectuals attempted to translate some passages from Shakespeare's plays, even if these were often via French translations. Antonio Conti lived in London from 1715 to 1718 and he composed two tragedies during his sojourn: Julius Caesar and Marcus Brutus, both inspired by Shakespeare's Julius Caesar. In the preface to the tragedies, Conti praised Shakespeare and expressed his surprise at the fact that no Italian writer had attempted a translation of the Bard sooner. He also noted how Shakespeare did not respect the Aristotelian units. Italian playwrights, on the other hand, were still observing these principles and Conti was no exception. Therefore, the action of his tragedies takes place in one location and it only lasts a few hours.

In 1729, Paolo Rolli published an Italian translation of the first six books of Paradise Lost. In the preface, he praised Shakespeare and compared him to Dante. In 1739 he published a translation of one of Hamlet's monologues.

The first complete Italian translation of a Shakespearean tragedy was Giulio Cesare by Domenico Valentini, printed in 1756. Valentini used the English edition of the tragedy printed in 1733 by Lewis Theobald for his translation. In his preface, he stated that he did not understand English, therefore, he asked for the help of some knights, whose identity is still unknown. It is probable that they were English knights who were visiting Siena as part of The Grand Tour. It was common for Italian and English people to meet in social and cultural gatherings. This is probably how Valentini met them and asked them to assist him in the process of translation.

Other intellectuals worked on Shakespeare towards the end of the century. Giuseppe Baretti published Discours sur Shakespeare et M.r de Voltaire in 1777; Alessandro Verri translated Hamlet and Othello between 1769 and 1777; Francesco Algarotti, who did not appreciate English theatre, changed his mind when he saw a representation of Julius Caesar in London. He also translated the passages he thought were the most salient in Brutus's speech. Giustina Renier Michiel translated Othello, Macbeth and Coriolanus between 1798 and 1801. It is still uncertain whether she worked alone. Letters exchanged with Cesarotti lead scholars to think that she may have been helped by another Italian writer. It is also possible that she worked alone, using a French rendition to help with the translations. The question is still unsolved.

=== In Spain ===
The knowledge of Shakespeare and his works in European countries, including Spain, arrived centuries after his death and not always easily. While it is possible that some Shakespeare plays may have arrived in Spain as soon as the end of the 16th century and the first half of the 17th century, the earliest documented example of a work of Shakespeare's in Spain is The Two Noble Kinsmen, circa 1640. But the first editions to reach Spain were in recusant libraries and did not have an impact on playwrights and play-goers in Spain.

There is weak evidence that a First Folio and strong evidence that Second Folio containing historical dramas arrived in the country after 1632, the year in which the latter was published in England. There is also evidence of a third Folio imported in Spain in 1742 but it is now lost. However, these editions alone were not sufficient to spark the interest of Spanish writers and critics. Shakespeare's works began to be read by a larger number of intellectuals in the 18th century; however, Shakespeare did not arrive to Spain in his original language, but he began to be studied thanks to French adaptations and rewritings. Spanish scholars rarely read Shakespeare in English.

The arrival of Shakespeare in the country brought with it the debate on theatre, its rules, its virtues and vices. The classical rules of Spanish, French and Italian theatre, derived from the classical theatre, were often an obstacle for the introduction of innovations coming from different theatrical traditions. English theatre, for instance, did not respect classical rules. This provoked admiration but, at the same time, rejection for Shakespeare and his works: on one hand his imagination was admired but on the other he used too many features that did not find their place in the Spanish tradition. Those critics who expressed their judgment on the Bard in the 18th century judged him from a classical perspective and since he did not comply with the classical rules of theatre, he was not worth of appreciation. As a consequence, his works began to be translated only at the end of the 18th century. The first Spanish translation of Shakespeare dates to 1798, when Leandro Fernandéz de Moratìn translated Hamlet. However, the first tragedy to be translated directly from the original English version, without the mediation of a French text, dates to 1838 and it was Macbeth translated by José García de Villalta. Shakespearean plays began to be represented in Spanish theatres only at the beginning of the 19th century but they were often neoclassic adaptations derived from French rewritings. Between 1808 and 1817 Othello, Romeo and Juliet and Macbeth were brought to the stage. Shakespeare began to be appreciated more with the advent of Romanticism.

== 19th century ==
=== Shakespeare in performance ===
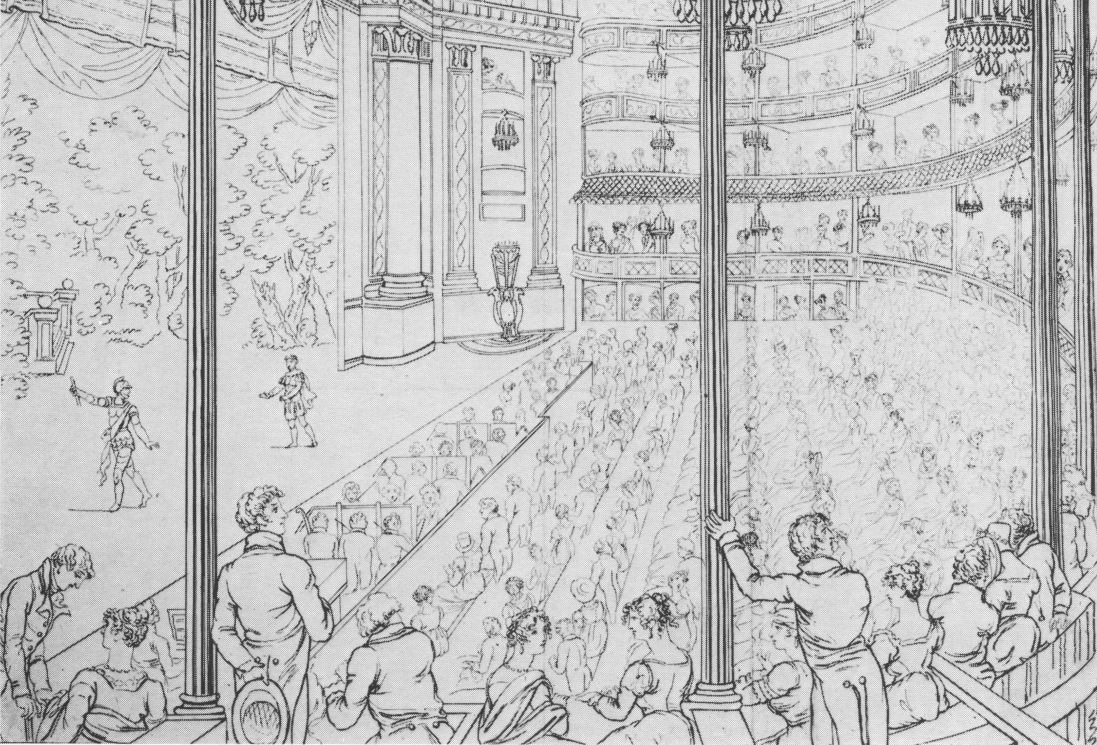
The Theatre Royal at Drury Lane in 1813. The platform stage is gone, and note the orchestra cutting off the actors from the audience.

Theatres and theatrical scenery became ever more elaborate in the 19th century, and the acting editions used were progressively cut and restructured to emphasise more and more the soliloquies and the stars, at the expense of pace and action. Performances were further slowed by the need for frequent pauses to change the scenery, creating a perceived need for even more cuts to keep performance length within tolerable limits; it became a generally accepted maxim that Shakespeare's plays were too long to be performed without substantial cuts. The platform, or apron, stage, on which actors of the 17th century would come forward for audience contact, was gone, and the actors stayed permanently behind the fourth wall or proscenium arch, further separated from the audience by the orchestra, see image right.

During the 19th century, prominent actors often attracted greater attention than the plays in which they performed. Notable performers of the period included Sarah Siddons (1755–1831), John Philip Kemble (1757–1823), Henry Irving (1838–1905), and Ellen Terry (1847–1928). To be a star of the legitimate drama came to mean being first and foremost a "great Shakespeare actor," with a famous interpretation of, for men, Hamlet, and for women, Lady Macbeth, and especially with a striking delivery of the great soliloquies. The acme of spectacle, star, and soliloquy Shakespeare performance came with the reign of actor-manager Henry Irving at the Royal Lyceum Theatre in London from 1878 to 1899. At the same time, a revolutionary return to the roots of Shakespeare's original texts, and to the platform stage, absence of scenery, and fluid scene changes of the Elizabethan theatre, was being effected by William Poel's Elizabethan Stage Society.

=== Shakespeare in criticism ===
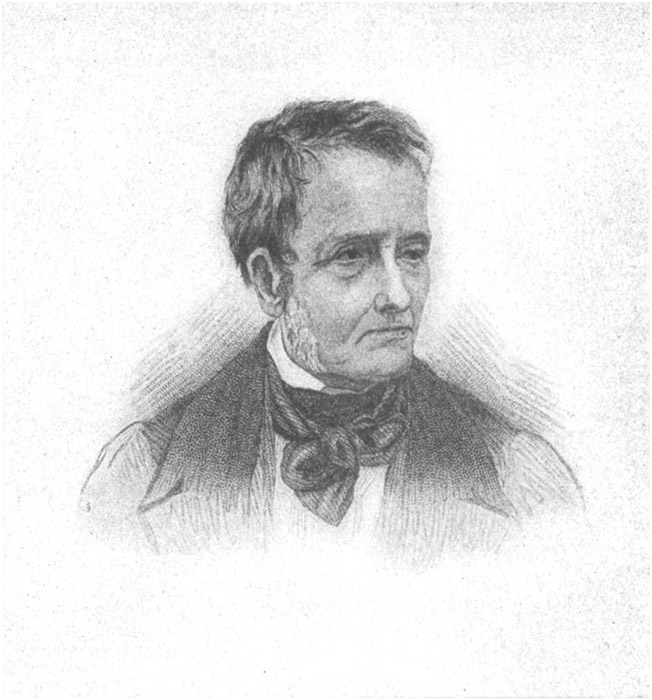
Thomas De Quincey: "O, mighty poet! Thy works are... like the phenomena of nature, like the sun and the sea, the stars and the flowers".

The belief in the unappreciated 18th-century Shakespeare was proposed at the beginning of the 19th century by the Romantics, in support of their view of 18th-century literary criticism as mean, formal, and rule-bound, which was contrasted with their own reverence for the poet as prophet and genius. Such ideas were most fully expressed by German critics such as Goethe and the Schlegel brothers. Romantic critics such as Samuel Taylor Coleridge and William Hazlitt raised admiration for Shakespeare to worship or even "bardolatry" (a sarcastic coinage from bard + idolatry by George Bernard Shaw in 1901, meaning excessive or religious worship of Shakespeare). To compare him to other Renaissance playwrights at all, even for the purpose of finding him superior, began to seem irreverent. Shakespeare was rather to be studied without any involvement of the critical faculty, to be addressed or apostrophised—almost prayed to—by his worshippers, as in Thomas De Quincey's classic essay "On the Knocking at the Gate in Macbeth" (1823): "O, mighty poet! Thy works are not as those of other men, simply and merely great works of art; but are also like the phenomena of nature, like the sun and the sea, the stars and the flowers,—like frost and snow, rain and dew, hail-storm and thunder, which are to be studied with entire submission of our own faculties...".

As the concept of literary originality grew in importance, critics were horrified at the idea of adapting Shakespeare's tragedies for the stage by putting happy endings on them, or editing out the puns in Romeo and Juliet. In another way, what happened on the stage was seen as unimportant, as the Romantics, themselves writers of closet drama, considered Shakespeare altogether more suitable for reading than staging. Charles Lamb saw any form of stage representation as distracting from the true qualities of the text. This view, argued as a timeless truth, was also a natural consequence of the dominance of melodrama and spectacle on the early 19th-century stage.

Shakespeare became an important emblem of national pride in the 19th century, which was the heyday of the British Empire and the acme of British power in the world. To Thomas Carlyle in On Heroes, Hero-Worship, & the Heroic in History (1841), Shakespeare was one of the great poet-heroes of history, in the sense of being a "rallying-sign" for British cultural patriotism all over the world, including even the lost American colonies: "From Paramatta, from New York, wheresoever... English men and women are, they will say to one another, 'Yes, this Shakespeare is ours; we produced him, we speak and think by him; we are of one blood and kind with him'" ("The Hero as a Poet"). As the foremost of the great canonical writers, the jewel of English culture, and as Carlyle puts it, "merely as a real, marketable, tangibly useful possession", Shakespeare became in the 19th century a means of creating a common heritage for the motherland and all her colonies. Post-colonial literary critics have had much to say of this use of Shakespeare's plays in what they regard as a move to subordinate and uproot the cultures of the colonies themselves.

Across the North Sea, Shakespeare remained influential in Germany. In 1807, August Wilhelm Schlegel translated all of Shakespeare's plays into German, and such was the popularity of Schlegel's translation (which is generally regarded as one of the best translations of Shakespeare into any language), that German nationalists were soon starting to claim that Shakespeare was actually a German playwright who had just written his plays in English. By the middle of the 19th century, Shakespeare had been incorporated into the pantheon of German literature. In 1904, a statue of Shakespeare was erected in Weimar, showing the Bard of Avon staring into the distance, becoming the first statue built to honor Shakespeare on the mainland of Europe.

=== Romantic icon in Russia ===
In the Romantic age, Shakespeare became extremely popular in Russia. Vissarion Belinsky wrote he had been "enslaved by the drama of Shakespeare". Russia's national poet, Alexander Pushkin, was heavily influenced by Hamlet and the history plays, and his novel Boris Godunov showed strong Shakespearean influences. Later on, in the 19th century, the novelist Ivan Turgenev often wrote essays on Shakespeare with the best known being "Hamlet and Don Quixote". Fyodor Dostoevsky was greatly influenced by Macbeth with his novel Crime and Punishment showing Shakespearean influence in his treatment of the theme of guilt. From the 1840s onward, Shakespeare was regularly staged in Russia, and the black American actor Ira Aldridge, who had been barred from the stage in the United States on the account of his skin color, became the leading Shakespearean actor in Russia in the 1850s, being decorated by the Emperor Alexander II for his work in portraying Shakespearean characters.

== 20th century ==
Shakespeare performances reflected the tensions of the times, and early in the 20th century, Barry Jackson of the Birmingham Repertory Theatre began the staging of modern-dress productions, thus starting a new trend in Shakespearean production. Performances of the plays could be highly interpretive. Thus, play directors would emphasise Marxist, feminist, or, perhaps most popularly, Freudian psychoanalytical interpretations of the plays, even as they retained letter-perfect scripts. The number of analytical approaches became more diverse by the latter part of the century, as critics applied theories such as structuralism, New Historicism, Cultural materialism, African American studies, queer studies, and literary semiotics to Shakespeare's works.

=== In the Third Reich ===
In 1934 the French government dismissed the director of the Comédie Française over a controversial production of Coriolanus that had been the occasion for right-wing violence, amidst the Stavisky affair. In the international protests that followed, came one from Germany, from none other than Joseph Goebbels. Although productions of Shakespeare's plays in Germany itself were subject to 'streamlining', he continued to be favoured as a great classical dramatist, especially so as almost every new German play since the late 1890s onwards was portrayed by German government propaganda as the work of left-wingers, of Jews or of "degenerates" of one kind or another. Politically acceptable writers had simply been unable to fill the gap, or had only been able to do so through producing propaganda. In 1935, Goebbels was to say "We can build autobahns, revive the economy, create a new army, but we... cannot manufacture new dramatists." With Schiller suspect for his radicalism, Lessing for his humanism and even Goethe for his lack of patriotism, the legacy of the "Aryan" Shakespeare was reinterpreted for new purposes.

Rodney Symington, Professor of Germanic and Russian Studies at the University of Victoria, Canada, deals with this question in The Nazi Appropriation of Shakespeare: Cultural Politics in the Third Reich (Edwin Mellen Press, 2005). The scholar reports that Hamlet, for instance, was reconceived as a proto-German warrior rather than a man with a conscience. Of this play, one critic wrote: "If the courtier Laertes is drawn to Paris and the humanist Horatio seems more Roman than Danish, it is surely no accident that Hamlet's alma mater should be Wittenberg." A leading magazine declared that the crime which deprived Hamlet of his inheritance was a foreshadowing of the Treaty of Versailles, and that the conduct of Gertrude was reminiscent of the "spineless" Weimar politicians.

Weeks after Hitler took power in 1933, an official party publication appeared, entitled Shakespeare – a Germanic Writer, a counter to those who wanted to ban all foreign influences. At the Propaganda Ministry, Rainer Schlosser, given charge of German theatre by Goebbels, mused that Shakespeare was more German than English. After the outbreak of the Second World War, the performance of Shakespeare was banned, though this ban was quickly lifted by Hitler in person, a favour extended to no other playwright. Not only did the regime appropriate the Bard, but it also appropriated Elizabethan England itself. To the Nazi leaders, Elizabethan England had been a young, vigorous nation, much like the Third Reich itself, quite unlike the decadent British Empire of the then present day.

There were some exceptions to the official approval of Shakespeare, as the great patriotic plays, most notably Henry V, were shelved. The reception of The Merchant of Venice was at best lukewarm (Marlowe's The Jew of Malta was suggested as a possible alternative), because it was not anti-Semitic enough for Nazi taste (the play's conclusion, in which the daughter of the Jewish antagonist converts to Christianity and marries one of the Gentile protagonists, particularly violated Nazi notions of racial purity). Hamlet was by far the most popular play, along with Macbeth and Richard III.

=== In the Soviet Union ===
Given the popularity of Shakespeare in Russia, there were film versions of Shakespeare that often differed from western interpretations, usually emphasizing a humanist message that implicitly criticized the Soviet regime. Othello (1955) by Sergei Yutkevich celebrated Desdemona's love for Othello as a triumph of love over racial hatred. Hamlet (1964) by Grigori Kozintsev portrayed 16th century Denmark as a dark, gloomy and oppressive place, with recurring images of imprisonment, these marking the film from the focus on the portcullis of Elsinore to the iron corset Ophelia is forced to wear as she goes insane. The tyranny of Claudius was made to resemble the tyranny of Stalin with gigantic portraits and busts of Claudius being prominent in the background of the film, suggesting that Claudius had engaged in a "cult of personality". Given the emphasis on images of imprisonment, Hamlet's decision to avenge his father becomes almost subsidiary to his struggle for freedom, as he challenges the Stalin-like tyranny of Claudius. Hamlet in this film resembles a Soviet dissident who—despite his own hesitation, fears and doubts—can no longer stand the moral rot around him. The film was based on a script written by the novelist Boris Pasternak, who had been persecuted under Stalin. The 1971 version of King Lear, also directed by Kozintsev, presented the play as a "Tolstoyan panorama of bestiality and courage" as Lear finds his moral redemption amongst the common people.

=== Acceptance in France ===
Shakespeare, for a variety of reasons, had never caught on in France, and even when his plays were performed in France in the 19th century, they were drastically altered to fit in with French tastes, with, for example, Romeo and Juliet having a happy ending. It was not until 1946 that Hamlet, as translated by André Gide, was performed in Paris and "ensured Shakespeare's elevation to cult status" in France. The philosopher Jean-Paul Sartre wrote that French intellectuals had been "abruptly reintegrated into history" by the German occupation of 1940–44 as the old teleological history version of history with the world getting progressively better (as led by France) no longer held, and as such the "nihilist" and "chaotic" plays of Shakespeare finally found an audience in France. The Economist observed: "By the late 1950s, Shakespeare had entered the French soul. No one who has seen the Comédie-Française perform his plays at the Salle Richelieu in Paris is likely to forget the special buzz in the audience, for the bard is the darling of France."

=== In China ===
In the years of tentative political and economic liberalization after the death of Mao in 1976, Shakespeare became popular in China. The very act of putting on a play by Shakespeare, formerly condemned as a "bourgeois Western imperialist author" whom no Chinese could respect, was in and of itself an act of quiet dissent. Of all Shakespeare's plays, the most popular in China in the late 1970s and 1980s was Macbeth. It has been posited that Chinese audiences saw in this play, first performed in England in 1606 and set in 11th century Scotland, a parallel with the Cultural Revolution of the late 1960s. The violence and bloody chaos of Macbeth reminded Chinese audiences of the violence and bloody chaos of the Cultural Revolution, and furthermore, the story of a national hero becoming a tyrant, complete with a power-hungry wife, was seen as a parallel with Mao Zedong and his wife, Jiang Qing. Reviewing a production of Macbeth in Beijing in 1980, one Chinese critic, Xu Xiaozhong, praised Macbeth as the story of "how the greed for power finally ruined a great man". Another critic, Zhao Xun, wrote: "Macbeth is the fifth Shakespearean play produced on the Chinese stage after the smashing of the Gang of Four. This play of conspiracy has always been performed at critical moments in the history of our nation".

Likewise, a 1982 production of King Lear was hailed by the critics as the story of "moral decline", of a story "when human beings' souls were so polluted that they even mistreated their aged parents", an allusion to the days of the Cultural Revolution when the young people serving in the Red Guard had berated, denounced, attacked and sometimes even killed their parents for failing to live up to "Mao Zedong thought". The play's director, the Shakespearean scholar Fang Ping, who had suffered during the Cultural Revolution for studying this "bourgeois Western imperialist", stated in an interview at the time that King Lear was relevant in China because King Lear, the "highest ruler of a monarchy", created a world full of cruelty and chaos where those who loved him were punished and those who did not were rewarded, a barely veiled reference to the often capricious behavior of Mao, who punished his loyal followers for no apparent reason. Cordelia's devotion and love for her father—despite his madness, cruelty and rejection of her—is seen in China as affirming traditional Confucian values, where love of the family counts above all, and for this reason, King Lear is seen in China as being a very "Chinese" play that affirms the traditional values of filial piety.

A 1981 production of The Merchant of Venice was a hit with Chinese audiences, as the play was seen to promote the theme of justice and fairness in life, with the character of Portia being especially popular, as she is seen as standing for, as one critic wrote, "the humanist spirit of the Renaissance" with its striving for "individuality, human rights and freedom". The theme of a religious conflict between a Jewish merchant vs. a Christian merchant in The Merchant of Venice is generally ignored in Chinese productions of The Merchant of Venice, as most Chinese find do not find the theme of Jewish-Christian conflict relevant. Unlike in Western productions, the character of Shylock is presented very much as an unnuanced villain, capable only of envy, spite, greed and cruelty, a man whose actions are only motivated by his spiritual impoverishment. By contrast, in the West, Shylock is usually presented as a nuanced villain, a man who has never held power over a Christian before, and lets that power go to his head. Another popular play, especially with dissidents under the Communist government, is Hamlet. Hamlet, with its theme of a man trapped under a tyrannical regime is very popular with Chinese dissidents, with one dissident Wu Ningkun, writing about his time in internal exile between 1958 and 1961 at a collective farm in a remote part of northern Manchuria, that he understood all too well the line "Denmark is a prison!"

=== Film ===
The divergence between text and performance in Shakespeare continued into the new medium of film. For instance, both Hamlet and Romeo and Juliet have been filmed in modern settings, sometimes with contemporary "updated" dialogue. Additionally, there have been efforts (notably by the BBC) to ensure the existence of a filmed or videotaped version of every Shakespeare play. The reasoning for this was educational, as many government initiatives recognised the need to get performative Shakespeare into the same classrooms as the plays being read.

=== Poetry ===
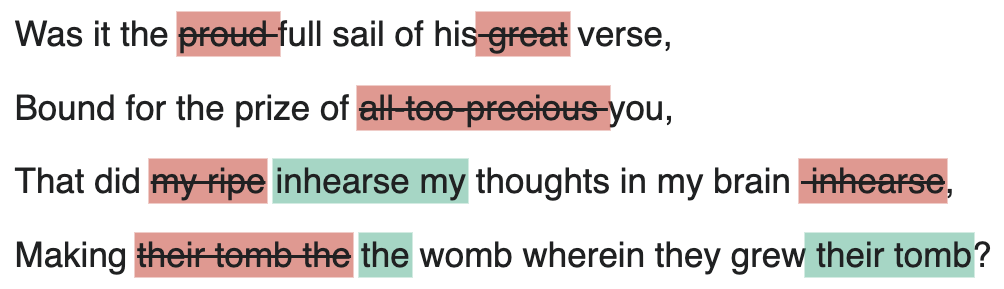
Bunting's edits to the opening lines of Shakespeare's Sonnet 86.

Many English-language Modernist poets drew on Shakespeare's works, interpreting him in new ways. Ezra Pound, for instance, considered the Sonnets as a kind of apprentice work, with Shakespeare learning the art of poetry through writing them. He also declared the history plays to be the true English epic. In Tradition and the Individual Talent, T. S. Eliot wrote that "Some can absorb knowledge, the more tardy must sweat for it. Shakespeare acquired more essential history from Plutarch than most men could from the whole British Museum." Basil Bunting rewrote the sonnets as modernist poems by simply erasing all the words he considered unnecessary. Louis Zukofsky had read all of Shakespeare's works by the time he was eleven, and his Bottom: On Shakespeare (1947) is a book-length prose poem exploring the role of the eye in the plays. In its original printing, a second volume consisting of a setting of The Tempest by the poet's wife, Celia Zukofsky, was also included.

== 21st century ==
Shakespeare's reputation continues to have an influence on the film industry, with new versions of his works, such as The Tragedy of Macbeth (2021), directed by Joel Coen, being put into production. Regular performances of Shakespeare's plays continue to be held globally. Critics continue to regard Shakespeare as the greatest playwright of the English language. Shakespeare's plays (especially A Midsummer Night's Dream, The Merchant of Venice and Julius Caesar) continue to be taught in numerous English-speaking schools globally, and have been translated into different languages.

== Critical quotations ==
The growth of Shakespeare's reputation is illustrated by a timeline of Shakespeare criticism, from John Dryden's "when he describes any thing, you more than see it, you feel it too" (1668) to Thomas Carlyle's estimation of Shakespeare as the "strongest of rallying-signs" (1841) for an English identity.
