= Shakespeare: The Invention of the Human =

Shakespearean criticism by Harold Bloom

- Author: Harold Bloom
- Language: English
- Subject: Shakespeare's plays
- Publication date: 1998

Shakespeare: The Invention of the Human is a survey of the works of Shakespeare, published in 1998 by literary critic Harold Bloom.

== Summary ==
Bloom provides an analysis of each of Shakespeare's 38 plays, 24 of which he believes "really are of the highest quality". Written as a companion to the general reader and theater-goer, Bloom declares that bardolatry "ought to be even more a secular religion than it already is". He also contends in the work that Shakespeare "invented" humanity, in that he prescribed the now-common practice of "overhearing" ourselves, which drives our changes. The two paragons of his theory are Sir John Falstaff of Henry IV and Hamlet, whom Bloom sees as representing self-satisfaction and self-loathing, respectively. These two characters, along with Iago and Cleopatra, Bloom believes (citing A. C. Bradley) are "the four Shakespearean characters most inexhaustible to meditation".

Throughout Shakespeare, characters from disparate plays are imagined alongside and interacting with each other. As in The Western Canon, Bloom criticizes what he calls the "school of resentment" for its failure to live up to the challenge of Shakespeare's universality and for balkanizing the study of literature through multicultural and historicist departments. Asserting Shakespeare's singular popularity throughout the world, Bloom proclaims him the only truly multicultural author. Repudiating the "social energies" to which historicists ascribed Shakespeare's authorship, Bloom pronounces his modern academic foes to be but "caricatures of Shakespearean energies".

== Reception ==
Anthony Holden says that the book became "something of a publishing phenomenon" – a 750-page survey of Shakespeare which gained bestseller status and drew widespread attention to its author. "If his analyses are boldly colloquial," says Holden, "at times so sounding almost as if they were dictated, his insights are unfailingly original and uncompromising."

The Boston Review's critic, Robert Atwan, says that while Bloom makes a bold claim, there is disappointingly little discussion of it. Most of the book is devoted to critical analyses of the plays and not explanation of the book's subtitle; though these analyses are "richly packed with brilliant observations", they "do not add up to the kind of systematic support Bloom's central claim deserves and demands", and not enough attention is given to the ramifications of that claim. Nicholas Lezard also questions whether Bloom supports his claim and wonders at the author's worship of Shakespeare's characters, but says the book would be very useful to undergraduates, because though "[i]t is, in a way, deranged, a long way from close reading ... it is also the product of an intelligent and sensitive man's complete immersion in his subject".

Publishers Weekly calls the book Bloom's "crowning achievement" in some ways and says that "[t]he ratio of screed to reading is blessedly low" compared to The Western Canon, recommending it especially to "performers and everyone who studies Shakespeare outside the academy". James Shapiro in The New York Times writes that the book is "unfortunately marred by a compulsion to denigrate" and finds Bloom's view of history to be "highly selective", but praises the author's insights into some of Shakespeare's works. "Had Bloom ... stuck to the plays and characters that he deeply understands," says Shapiro, "this book would have been a third as long and far more compelling."

Geoffrey O'Brien does not find Bloom's criticisms of the "school of resentment" to be overdone, for the most part, and points to a long scholarly tradition supporting Bloom's emphasis on the primary importance of Shakespeare's characters, though he does criticize Bloom's "obsession" with Falstaff and lack of focus on aspects of Shakespeare beyond the major characters. In O'Brien's opinion, "the great strength of Bloom's work is to insist at every point that the reader return to the text rather than get lost in generalizations or factoids". He says that Bloom "most stimulates when he most annoys", and that "[t]he power of Bloom's criticism at its best is to refresh that sense of witnessing a world's birth that is the uncanniest effect of reading Shakespeare or seeing him performed". O'Brien places the book as, in a way, the culmination of Bloom's series of "crossover" titles, "the indispensable critic on the indispensable writer".
