= Bardolatry =

Idolization of William Shakespeare

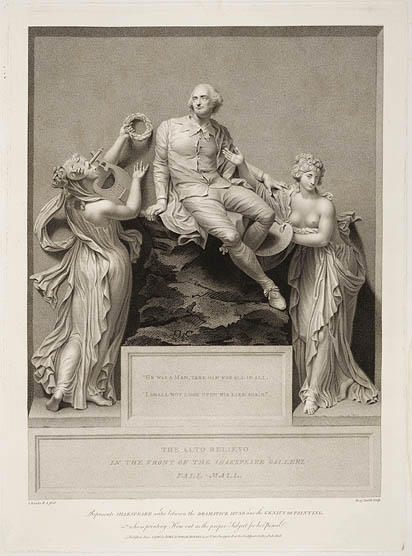
Engraving of the sculpture of Shakespeare at the entrance to the Boydell Shakespeare Gallery. The sculpture is now in the former garden of Shakespeare's home New Place in Stratford.

Bardolatry is excessive admiration of William Shakespeare. Shakespeare has been known as "the Bard" since the eighteenth century. One who idolizes Shakespeare is known as a bardolator. The term bardolatry, derived from Shakespeare's sobriquet "the Bard of Avon" and the Greek word latria "worship" (as in idolatry, worship of idols), was coined by George Bernard Shaw in the preface to his collection Three Plays for Puritans published in 1901. Shaw professed to dislike Shakespeare as a thinker and philosopher because Shaw believed that Shakespeare did not engage with social problems as Shaw did in his own plays. Shaw argued that the new naturalism of Henrik Ibsen's plays had made Shakespeare obsolete.

== Origins ==
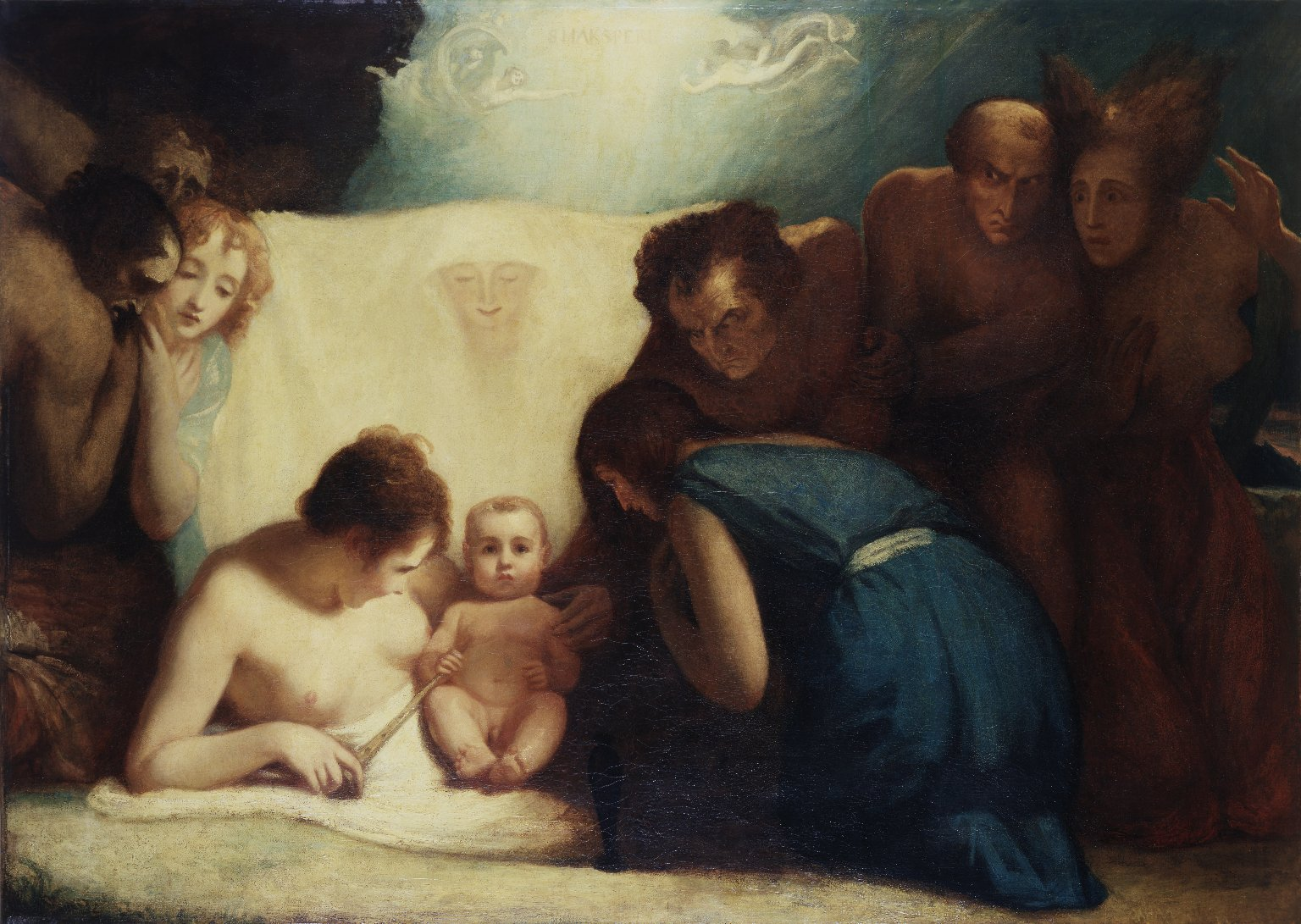
George Romney's The infant Shakespeare attended by Nature and the Passions, c. 1791–1792, representing the Romantic idea of Shakespeare's natural genius

The earliest references to the idolising of Shakespeare occur in an anonymous play, The Return from Parnassus, written during the poet's lifetime. A poetry-loving character says he will obtain a picture of Shakespeare for his study and that "I'll worship sweet Mr Shakespeare and to honour him will lay his Venus and Adonis under my pillow, as we read of one – I do not well remember his name, but I'm sure he was a king – slept with Homer under his bed's head". (Note: The Return from Parnassus, Act 4, scene 1.) However, this character is being satirised as a foolish lover of sensuous rather than serious literature.

The serious stance of bardolatry has its origins in the mid-18th century, when Samuel Johnson referred to Shakespeare's work as "a map of life". In 1769 the actor David Garrick, unveiling a statue of Shakespeare in Stratford-upon-Avon during the Shakespeare Jubilee, read out a poem culminating with the words "'tis he, 'tis he, / The God of our idolatry". Garrick also constructed a temple to Shakespeare at his home in Hampton. The phenomenon developed during the Romantic era, when Samuel Taylor Coleridge, John Keats, William Hazlitt, and others all described Shakespeare as a transcendent genius. Shaw's distaste for this attitude to Shakespeare is anticipated by William Cowper's attack on Garrick's whole festival as blasphemous in his poem The Task (1785).

== Voltaire ==
Voltaire traveled to England in 1726, and attended the Theatre Royal, Drury Lane several times, seeing multiple of Shakespeare's plays. He heralded Shakespeare as a writer of genius. He was the main promoter of Shakespeare's works in France, and he translated the first three acts of Julius Caesar into French. Through promotion, translation and dissemination, he laid the foundation for the cult of Shakespeare. Later, Voltaire tried to combat the cult by calling Shakespeare a barbarian, dismissing the cult as "simply bardolatry," and criticizing his grasp on the laws of art, but the ideals of the cult had already begun to spread.

== Victorian bardolatry ==
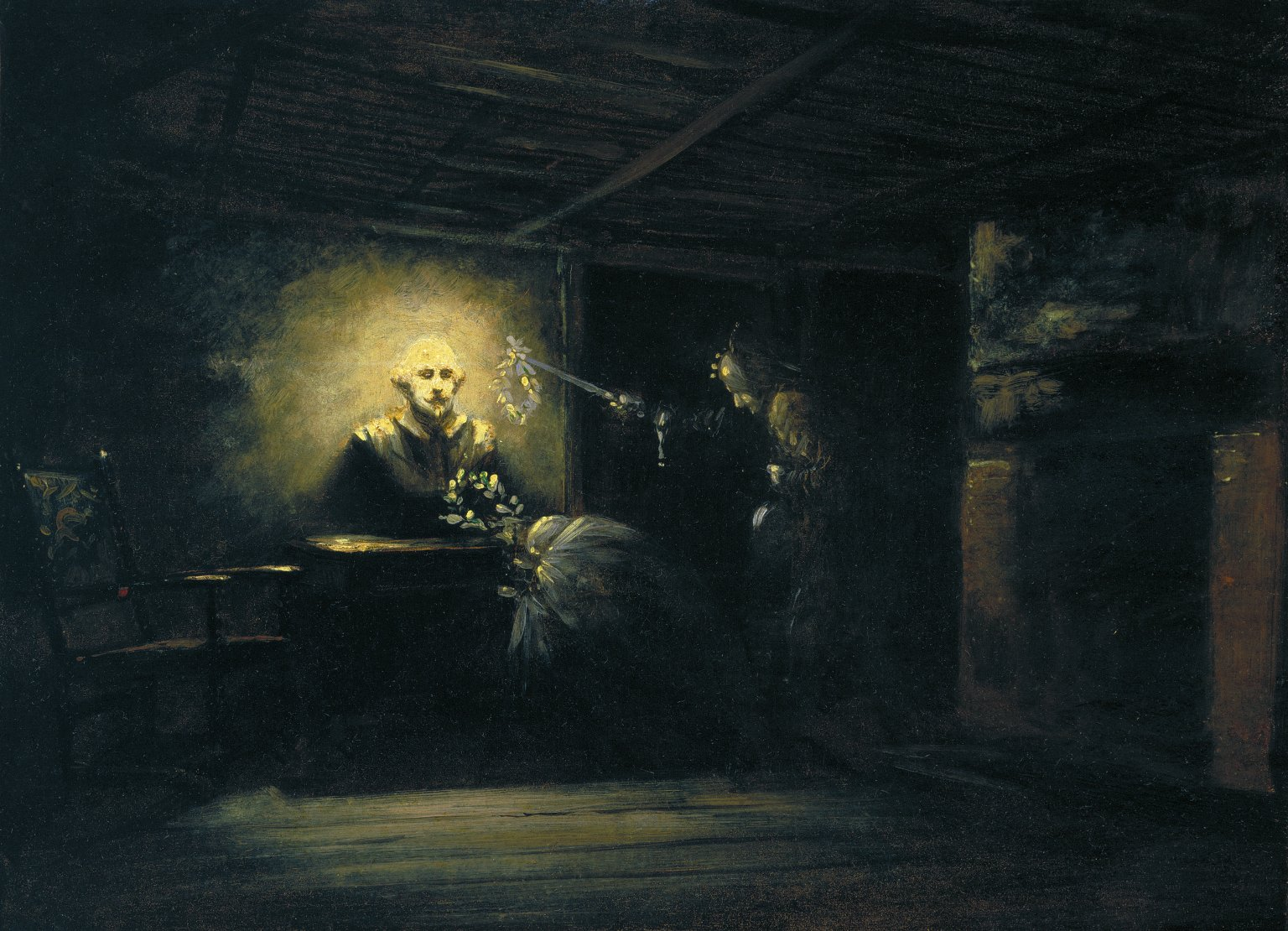
Thomas Nast, study for The Immortal Light of Genius, 1895.

The phenomenon became important in the Victorian era when many writers treated Shakespeare's works as a secular equivalent or replacement to the Bible. "This King Shakespeare," the essayist Thomas Carlyle wrote in 1840, "does not he shine, in crowned sovereignty, over us all, as the noblest, gentlest, yet strongest of rallying signs; indestructible".

The essential characteristic of bardolatry is that Shakespeare is presented as not only the greatest writer who ever lived, but also as the supreme intellect, the greatest psychologist, and the most faithful portrayer of the human condition and experience. In other words, bardolatry defines Shakespeare as the master of all human experience and of its intellectual analysis. As Carlyle stated,

Of this Shakspeare of ours, perhaps the opinion one sometimes hears a little idolatrously expressed is, in fact, the right one; I think the best judgment not of this country only, but of Europe at large, is slowly pointing to the conclusion, that Shakspeare is the chief of all Poets hitherto; the greatest intellect who, in our recorded world, has left record of himself in the way of Literature. On the whole, I know not such a power of vision, such a faculty of thought, if we take all the characters of it, in any other man. Such a calmness of depth; placid joyous strength; all things imaged in that great soul of his so true and clear, as in a tranquil unfathomable sea!

Shaw's sceptical views arose in response to such ideas. Shaw wished to demythologise Shakespeare. He emphasised that Shakespeare was capable of both brilliance and banality, a point made humorously in his late puppet play Shakes versus Shav, in which he compares Shakespeare's work to his own. He unequivocally asserted that Shakespeare was a great poet, even calling him "a very great author" at one point, and praised his use of what Shaw called "word-music". He also declared, "Nobody will ever write a better tragedy than Lear". However, he also wrote in a letter to Mrs Patrick Campbell, "Oh, what a damned fool Shakespeare was!", and complained of his "monstrous rhetorical fustian, his unbearable platitudes, his sententious combination of ready reflections with complete intellectual sterility".

== Harold Bloom ==
The critic Harold Bloom revived bardolatry in his 1998 book Shakespeare: The Invention of the Human, in which Bloom provides an analysis of each of Shakespeare's thirty-eight plays, "twenty-four of which are masterpieces." Written as a companion to the general reader and theatergoer, Bloom's book argues that bardolatry "ought to be even more a secular religion than it already is." He contends in the work that Shakespeare "invented" humanity, in that he prescribed the now-common practice of "overhearing" oneself, which drives one's own internal psychological development. In addition, he embraces the notion of the true reality of the characters of Shakespeare, regarding them as "real people" in the sense that they have altered the consciousness and modes of perception of not only readers, but most people in any western literate culture.

== See also ==
- Shakespeare's reputation

== Sources ==
- Carlyle, Thomas (1840). "The Hero as Poet. Dante; Shakespeare". On Heroes, Hero-Worship, and The Heroic in History. London: Chapman and Hall. pp. 73–106. hdl:2027/uc2.ark:/13960/t9d50vz8g. OL 17861419M.
- Dobson, Michael (1992). The Making of the National Poet: Shakespeare, Adaptation and Authorship, 1660–1769. Oxford: Clarendon Press. ISBN 978-0191591716.
- Karlin, Daniel (2013). The Figure of the Singer. Oxford: Oxford University Press. ISBN 978-0199213986.
- Lenker, Lagretta Tallent (2001). Fathers and Daughters in Shakespeare and Shaw. Contributions in Drama & Theatre Studies. Connecticut: Greenwood Press. ISBN 0-313-31754-2.
- Levin, H (1975). "The Primacy of Shakespeare". Shakespeare Quarterly. 26 (2). Folger Shakespeare Library: 99–112. doi:10.2307/2869240. JSTOR 2869240.
- Mason, Hadyn (September 1995). "Voltaire versus Shakespeare: The Lettre À L'Académie Française (1776)". Journal for Eighteenth-Century Studies. 18 (2). British Society for Eighteenth-Century Studies: 173–184. doi:10.1111/j.1754-0208.1995.tb00187.x.
- "A Playwright for the Ages". Royal Shakespeare Company Michigan Residency 2006. University of Michigan. 2006. Archived from the original on 17 December 2007.
- "bardolatry". Oxford English Dictionary (online ed.). Oxford University Press. (Subscription or participating institution membership required.)
- Sawyer, Robert (2003). Victorian Appropriations of Shakespeare. New Jersey: Fairleigh Dickinson University Press. ISBN 0-8386-3970-4.
- Shaw, G. Bernard (1906). "A Letter from Mr. G. Bernard Shaw". In Tolstoy, Leo (ed.). Tolstoy on Shakespeare: A Critical Essay on Shakespeare. New York and London: Funk & Wagnalls Company. pp. 166–169. OL 6983619M.
- Shaw, George Bernard (2003) [first published 1901]. Shaw, George Bernard (ed.). Three Plays for Puritans. Wildside Press. ISBN 978-0809533855.
- Smith, Emma (2004). Shakespeare's Tragedies. Oxford: Blackwell. ISBN 0-631-22010-0.
- Webster, Margaret (2000) [first published 1942]. Shakespeare Without Tears. Dover Publications. ISBN 978-0486410975.
