= The Anxiety of Influence =

1973 book by Harold Bloom

The Anxiety of Influence: A Theory of Poetry
- Cover of the first edition
- Author: Harold Bloom
- Language: English
- Subject: Literary criticism
- Publication date: 1973
- Publication place: United States
- Media type: Print
- ISBN: 0-19-511221-0

The Anxiety of Influence: A Theory of Poetry is a 1973 book by Harold Bloom on the anxiety of influence in writing poetry. It was the first in a series of books that advanced a new "revisionary" or antithetical approach to literary criticism. Bloom's central thesis is that poets are hindered in their creative process by the ambiguous relationship they necessarily maintain with precursor poets. While admitting the influence of extraliterary experience on every poet, he argues that "the poet in a poet" is inspired to write by reading another poet's poetry and will tend to produce work that is in danger of being derivative of existing poetry, and, therefore, weak. Because poets historically emphasize an original poetic vision in order to guarantee their survival into posterity, the influence of precursor poets inspires a sense of anxiety in living poets. Thus Bloom attempts to work out the process by which the small minority of 'strong' poets manage to create original work in spite of the pressure of influence. Such an agon (a vain attempt by a writer to resolve the conflict between his ideas and those of a much more influential predecessor), Bloom argues, depends on six revisionary ratios, which reflect Freudian and quasi-Freudian defense mechanisms, as well as the tropes of classical rhetoric.

Before writing this book, Bloom spent a decade studying the Romantic poets of the early nineteenth century. This is reflected in the emphasis given to those poets and their struggle with the influence of John Milton, Robert Burns, and Edmund Spenser. Other poets analyzed range from Lucretius and Dante to Walt Whitman, Wallace Stevens, and John Ashbery. In The Anxiety of Influence and other early books, Bloom claimed that influence was particularly important for post-enlightenment poets. Conversely, he suggested that influence might have been less of a problem for such poets as Shakespeare and Ben Jonson. Bloom later changed his mind, and the most recent editions of The Anxiety of Influence include a preface claiming that Shakespeare was troubled early in his career by the influence of Christopher Marlowe. The book itself is divided into six major categories, called "six revisionary ratios" by Bloom. They are clinamen, tessera, kenosis, daemonization, askesis, and apophrades.

== Six revisionary ratios ==
Bloom introduces his six revisionary ratios in the following manner, which he consistently applies in this book as well as his successor volume titled A Map of Misreading.

- Clinamen – Bloom defines this as "poetic misreading or misprision proper". The poet makes a swerve away from the precursor in the form of a "corrective movement". This swerve suggests that the precursor "went accurately up to a certain point", but should have swerved in the direction that the new poem moves. Bloom took the word clinamen from Lucretius, who refers to swerves of atoms that make change possible.
- Tessera – Bloom defines this as "completion and antithesis". The author "completes" his precursor's work, retaining its terms but meaning them in a new sense, "as though the precursor had failed to go far enough". The word tessera refers to a fragment that, together with other fragments, reconstitutes the whole; Bloom is referring to ancient mystery cults, who would use tessera as tokens of recognition.
- Kenosis – Bloom defines this as a "breaking device similar to the defence mechanisms our psyches employ against repetition compulsions", in other words "a movement toward discontinuity with the precursor". The poet humbles himself, "as though he were ceasing to be a poet", but does so in such a way as to empty out the precursor poem too, so that the later poet is not deflated as much as may seem. Bloom took the word kenosis from St. Paul, who uses it to refer to Jesus accepting his own reduction from divine to human status.
- Daemonization – Bloom defines this as a "movement towards a personalized Counter-Sublime, in reaction to the precursor’s Sublime". The author suggests that the powers in the precursor poem actually derive from something beyond it; the poet does so "to generalize away the uniqueness of the earlier work". Bloom took the term daemonization from Neoplatonism, where it refers to an adept being aided by an intermediary, who is neither divine nor human.
- Askesis – Bloom defines this as a "movement of self-purgation which intends the attainment of a state of solitude". The author curtails the impression of his/her own "human and imaginative endowment" in order to separate themselves from others and stress his/her own individuality. The poet does this in such a way as to do the same to the precursor, whose limitations and individuality are also emphasized, separating him/her from the later poet. Bloom took the word askesis (asceticism) from the pre-Socratic philosophers.
- Apophrades – Bloom defines this as the “return of the dead”. The poet, toward the end of his/her life, opens up his poem – this time deliberately rather than naturally – to the precursor's influence. But this deliberateness creates the uncanny effect that the precursor's work seems to be derivative of the later poet. Bloom took the word apophrades from the Athenian concept of the days on which the dead return to reinhabit the houses in which they once lived.

== See also ==
- Covering cherub
