= The American Religion =

1992 book by Harold Bloom

The American Religion: The Emergence of the Post-Christian Nation
- Cover of the first edition
- Author: Harold Bloom
- Language: English
- Subject: Religion in the United States
- Publisher: Simon & Schuster
- Publication date: 1992 (1st edition); 2006 (2nd edition)
- Publication place: United States
- Media type: Print (Hardcover and Paperback)
- Pages: 288 (1st edition); 305 (2nd edition)
- ISBN: 0-671-67997-X

The American Religion: The Emergence of the Post-Christian Nation (1992; second edition 2006) is a book by literary critic Harold Bloom, in which the author covers the topic of religion in the United States from a perspective which he calls religious criticism.

== Summary ==
Bloom lays out his conception of a practice of religious criticism, by which he does not mean criticism of religion. He distinguishes the practice from other aspects of religious studies (e.g., history of religion or philosophy of religion) by analogy with his practice of literary criticism. Bloom says, literary criticism involves aspects of history et cetera, but is distinguished by having a focus on aesthetic judgments concerning literature. Bloom's religious criticism thus will involve history et cetera, but also pay attention particularly to the spiritual values of religions.

In this book, Bloom begins this practice by looking at religious groups in the United States. Bloom identifies Ralph Waldo Emerson and William James as previous scholars who practiced religious criticism of American religion. He concludes that in America there is a single, dominant religion of which many nominally distinct denominations are a part. Among these he identifies Mormonism, the Southern Baptist Convention, Pentecostalism, and Seventh-day Adventism. To a lesser extent however, he also includes nearly all "Christian" denominations in America, including mainline Protestantism and Roman Catholicism. Bloom's view is that all of these groups in America are united by requiring that each person may only truly meet with the divine when experiencing a "total inward solitude" and that salvation cannot be achieved by engaging with a community, but only through a one-to-one confrontation with the divine. While Bloom suggests that this American form of religion is to some extent a continuation of Enthusiasm in Europe, American religious groups are rightly distinguished from traditional Christianity: Although all of these groups identify as Christian, Bloom believes they represent a radical departure from the core aspects of that religion. Bloom says that the American religion is rather more like a form of Gnosticism. Bloom says that the events of the Second Great Awakening at Cane Ridge were formative for the American religion.

Bloom regards the American Religion as successful by his standards for religious imagination; however, he distinguishes this success from the social and political consequences of the religion. At times he criticizes elements in the American religion for their political activities, saying even that he is "politically appalled by what may be some of its consequences. Since the Reagan-Bush national Republicans have become one with the American Religion, my fear is that we will never again see a Democrat in the Presidency during my lifetime."

== Publication history ==
The first edition was published by Simon & Schuster in 1992 with the full title, The American Religion: The Emergence of the Post-Christian Nation. The second edition was published by Chu Hartley Publishers in 2006 without the subtitle and included a new afterword.

== Reception ==
In Reviews in American History, Henry F. May writes that the work is "brilliant and original" and that "Historians interested in American religion ... will do well to read it and think about what it says." He also however criticizes Bloom for being "unabashedly subjective and sometimes wrong-headed" and using "sweeping generalizations".

Writing in Commentary, Richard John Neuhaus dismissed the book as "a 288-page imaginative flirtation with nonsense". Neuhaus says that Bloom's interpretations of various denominations unduly ignore the explicit statements from these religious groups.

Writing in America, James P. Hanigan says that Bloom offers "suggestive and important insights", particularly the claim that traditional Christianity is not well-suited to Americans, and that the belief in direct experience of God is connected to anti-intellectualism. Hanigan suggests though that Bloom's argument is motivated by his own "Gnostic" spirituality, and concludes that it is, in the end, unpersuasive.
