= America's Religions =

2002 non-fiction book by Peter Williams

America's Religions: From Their Origins to the Twenty-First Century (2002) by Peter Williams is a scholarly book covering a variety of religions in the United States. It is a major reworking of Williams' earlier book America's Religions: Traditions and Cultures, published in 1990.

== Background ==
The book is not limited to only indigenous American religions, but includes a wide variety of groups within American culture. Religions covered in the book include Episcopalianism, Lutheranism, Millerism, Campbellism, The Church of Jesus Christ of Latter-day Saints, Pentecostalism, New Age movements, African-based and Native American religions, and more. It is also not confined to modern movements but spans America's religious history, beginning with the pre-Columbian traditions of Native Americans. The book also covers how religious changes have effected American politics.

The book is organized so that each chapter can stand on its own, and is divided into five sections, with section 1 introducing various religious traditions, section 2 exploring the pre-Revolutionary American era, sections 3 and 4 looking at religious history up to World War I, and section 5 examining modernity and pluralism in the twentieth century. It also includes a 30-page index and a 55-page bibliography for reference. New editions of the book have been updated to cover more current events, such as the election of Barack Obama, Catholic sexual abuse scandals, and the effect of religion on wars in Iraq and Afghanistan.

According to historian Kathleen Flake, "America's Religions attempts to emphasize the unique histories of religious communities without losing the broader sweep of American religion or the deeper insights of a thematic approach. To a remarkable degree it succeeds... America's Religions is encyclopedic in the best sense of the word."
