= Harold Bloom =

American critic, scholar, and writer (1930–2019)

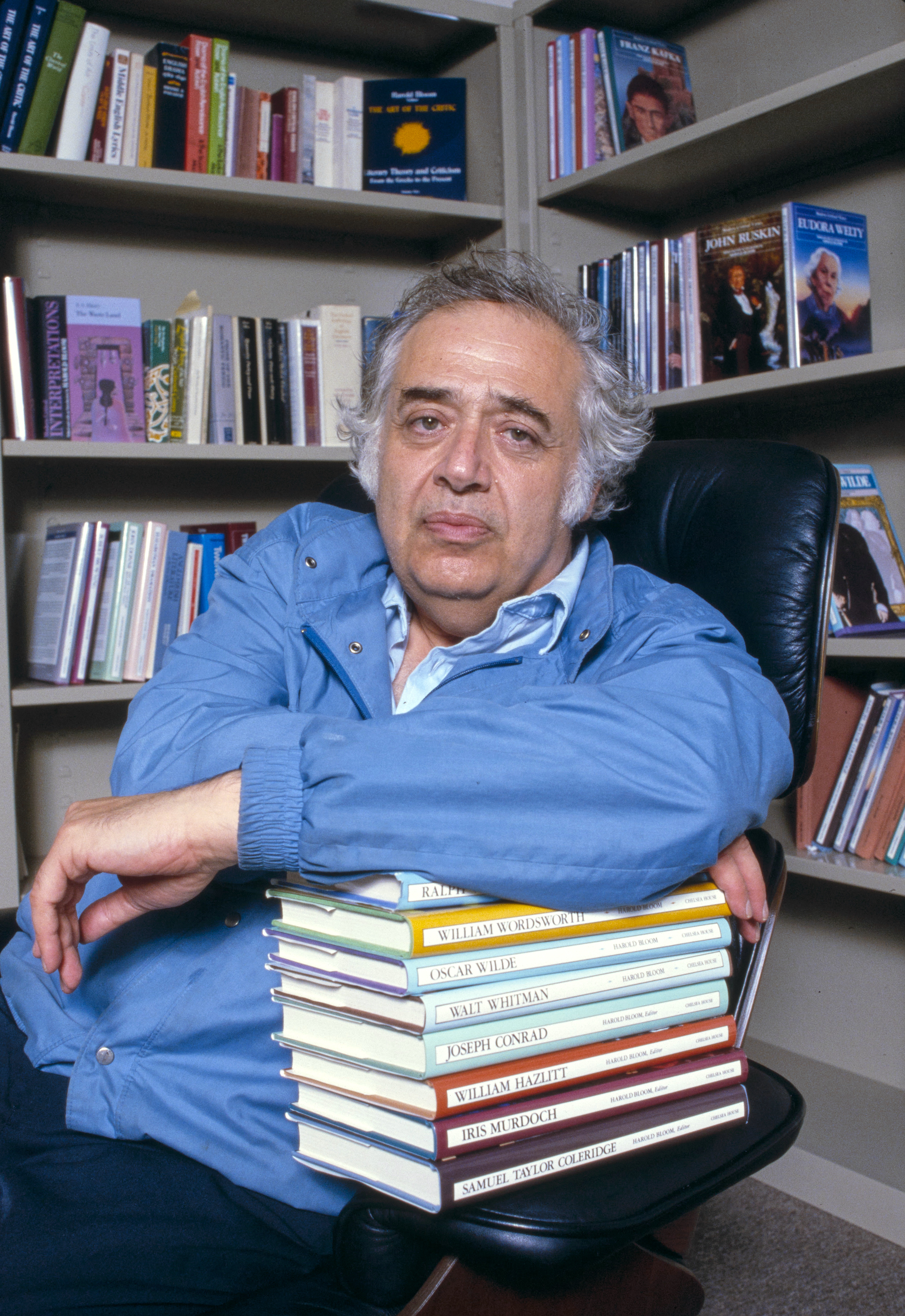
- Bloom in 1986
- Born: July 11, 1930; New York City, U.S.
- Died: October 14, 2019 (aged 89); New Haven, Connecticut, U.S.
- Education: Cornell University (BA); Pembroke College, Cambridge; Yale University (MA, PhD)
- Occupations: Literary critic; writer; professor
- Spouse: Jeanne Gould (m. 1958)
- Children: 2
- Writing career
- Years active: 1955–2019
- Movements: Aestheticism, Romanticism

Harold Bloom (July 11, 1930 – October 14, 2019) was an American literary critic and the Sterling Professor of humanities at Yale University. In 2017, Bloom was called "probably the most famous literary critic in the English-speaking world". After publishing his first book in 1959, Bloom wrote more than 50 books, including over 40 books of literary criticism, several books discussing religion, and one novel. He edited hundreds of anthologies concerning numerous literary and philosophical figures for the Chelsea House publishing firm. Bloom's books have been translated into more than 40 languages. He was elected to the American Philosophical Society in 1995.

Bloom was a defender of the traditional Western canon at a time when literature departments were focusing on what he derided as the "School of Resentment" (which included multiculturalism, feminism, and Marxism).

== Early life and education ==
Bloom was born in New York City on July 11, 1930, to Paula (née Lev) and William Bloom. He lived in the Bronx at 1410 Grand Concourse. He was raised as an Orthodox Jew in a Yiddish-speaking household, where he learned literary Hebrew; he learned English at age six. Bloom's father, a garment worker, was born in Odesa and his Lithuanian Jewish mother, a homemaker, near Brest-Litovsk in what is today Belarus. Harold had three older sisters and an older brother. He was the last living sibling.

As a boy, Bloom read Hart Crane's Collected Poems, a collection that inspired his lifelong fascination with poetry. Bloom went to the Bronx High School of Science, where his grades were poor but his standardized-test scores were high. In 1951 he received a B.A. degree in classics from Cornell University, where he was a student of literary critic M. H. Abrams, and in 1955 a Ph.D. from Yale. In 1954–55 Bloom was a Fulbright Scholar at Pembroke College, Cambridge.

Bloom was a standout student at Yale, where he clashed with the faculty of New Critics, including William K. Wimsatt. Several years later Bloom dedicated his book The Anxiety of Influence to Wimsatt.

== Teaching career ==
Bloom was a member of the Yale English Department from 1955 to 2019, teaching his final class four days before his death. He received a MacArthur Fellowship in 1985. From 1988 to 2004, Bloom was Berg Professor of English at New York University while maintaining his position at Yale. In 2010, he became a founding patron of Ralston College, a new institution in Savannah, Georgia, that focuses on primary texts. Fond of endearments, Bloom addressed both male and female students and friends as "my dear".

== Personal life and death ==
Bloom married Jeanne Gould in 1958. They had two children. In a 2005 interview, Jeanne said that she and Harold were both atheists, which he denied: "No, no, I'm not an atheist. It's no fun being an atheist."

Bloom was the subject of "Bloom in Love", a 1990 article in GQ that accused him of having affairs with female graduate students. He called the article a "disgusting piece of character assassination". Bloom's friend and colleague the biographer R. W. B. Lewis said in 1994 that Bloom's "wandering, I gather is a thing of the past. I hate to say it, but he rather bragged about it, so that wasn't very secret for a number of years." In a 2004 article for New York magazine, Naomi Wolf wrote that while she was an undergraduate student at Yale University in 1983, Bloom placed his hand on her inner thigh at a dinner arranged to discuss her writing. Bloom "vigorously denied" the allegation. Camille Paglia criticized Wolf, accusing her of launching a witch hunt and calling it "indecent" to make allegations about events from 20 years earlier. In response, Andrea Dworkin defended Wolf's trustworthiness despite their intellectual and ideological disagreements, while Jenni Murray, Marcelle d'Argy Smith, and Elizabeth Wurtzel responded more critically, casting doubt on Wolf's account and questioning the long gap between the alleged incident and Wolf's disclosure.

Bloom never retired from teaching, swearing that he would need to be removed from the classroom "in a great big body bag". He had open heart surgery in 2002 and broke his back after a fall in 2008. He died at a hospital in New Haven, Connecticut, on October 14, 2019. He was 89 years old.

== Writing career ==
=== Defense of Romanticism ===
Bloom began his career with a sequence of highly regarded monographs on Percy Bysshe Shelley (Shelley's Myth-making, Yale University Press, originally Bloom's doctoral dissertation), William Blake (Blake's Apocalypse, Doubleday), W. B. Yeats (Yeats, Oxford University Press), and Wallace Stevens (Wallace Stevens: The Poems of Our Climate, Cornell University Press). In these, he defended the High Romantics against neo-Christian critics influenced by such writers as T. S. Eliot, who became a recurring intellectual foil. Bloom had a contentious approach: his first book, Shelley's Myth-making, charged many contemporary critics with sheer carelessness in their reading of the poet.

=== Influence theory ===
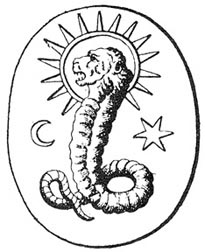
A lion-faced deity associated with Gnosticism. Bloom frequently referred to Gnosticism when speaking about general and personal religious matters.

After a personal crisis during the late 1960s, Bloom became deeply interested in Ralph Waldo Emerson, Sigmund Freud, and the ancient mystic traditions of Gnosticism, Kabbalah, and Hermeticism. In a 2003 interview with Bloom, Michael Pakenham, the book editor for The Baltimore Sun, noted that Bloom had long called himself a "Jewish Gnostic". Bloom responded: "I am using 'Gnostic' in a very broad way. I am nothing if not Jewish... I really am a product of Yiddish culture. But I can't understand a Yahweh, or a God, who could be all-powerful and all-knowing and would allow the Nazi death camps and schizophrenia." Influenced by his reading, he began a series of books that focused on the way in which poets struggle to create their individual poetic visions without being overcome by the influence of the poets who inspired them to write.

The first of these books, Yeats, challenged the conventional critical view of William Butler Yeats's poetic career. In the introduction to this volume, Bloom set out the basic principles of his new approach to criticism: "Poetic influence, as I conceive it, is a variety of melancholy or the anxiety-principle." New poets become inspired to write because they have read and admired previous poets, but this admiration turns into resentment when the new poets discover that the poets they idolized have already said everything they wish to say. The poets become disappointed because they "cannot be Adam early in the morning. There have been too many Adams, and they have named everything."

In order to evade this psychological obstacle, according to Bloom, poets must be convinced that earlier poets have gone wrong somewhere and failed in their vision, thus leaving open the possibility that they have something to add to the tradition. Poets' love for their heroes turns into antagonism toward them: "Initial love for the precursor's poetry is transformed rapidly enough into revisionary strife, without which individuation is not possible." The book that followed Yeats, The Anxiety of Influence, which Bloom started writing in 1967, drew upon the example of Walter Jackson Bate's The Burden of the Past and The English Poet and recast in systematic psychoanalytic form Bate's historicized account of the despair 17th- and 18th-century poets felt about their inability to equal their predecessors. Bloom attempted to trace the psychological process by which poets broke free from their precursors to achieve their own poetic visions. He drew a sharp distinction between "strong poets", who perform "strong misreadings" of their precursors, and "weak poets", who merely repeat their precursors' ideas as though following a kind of doctrine. He described this process in terms of a sequence of "revisionary ratios" through which strong poets pass in the course of their careers.

=== Addenda and developments of his theory ===
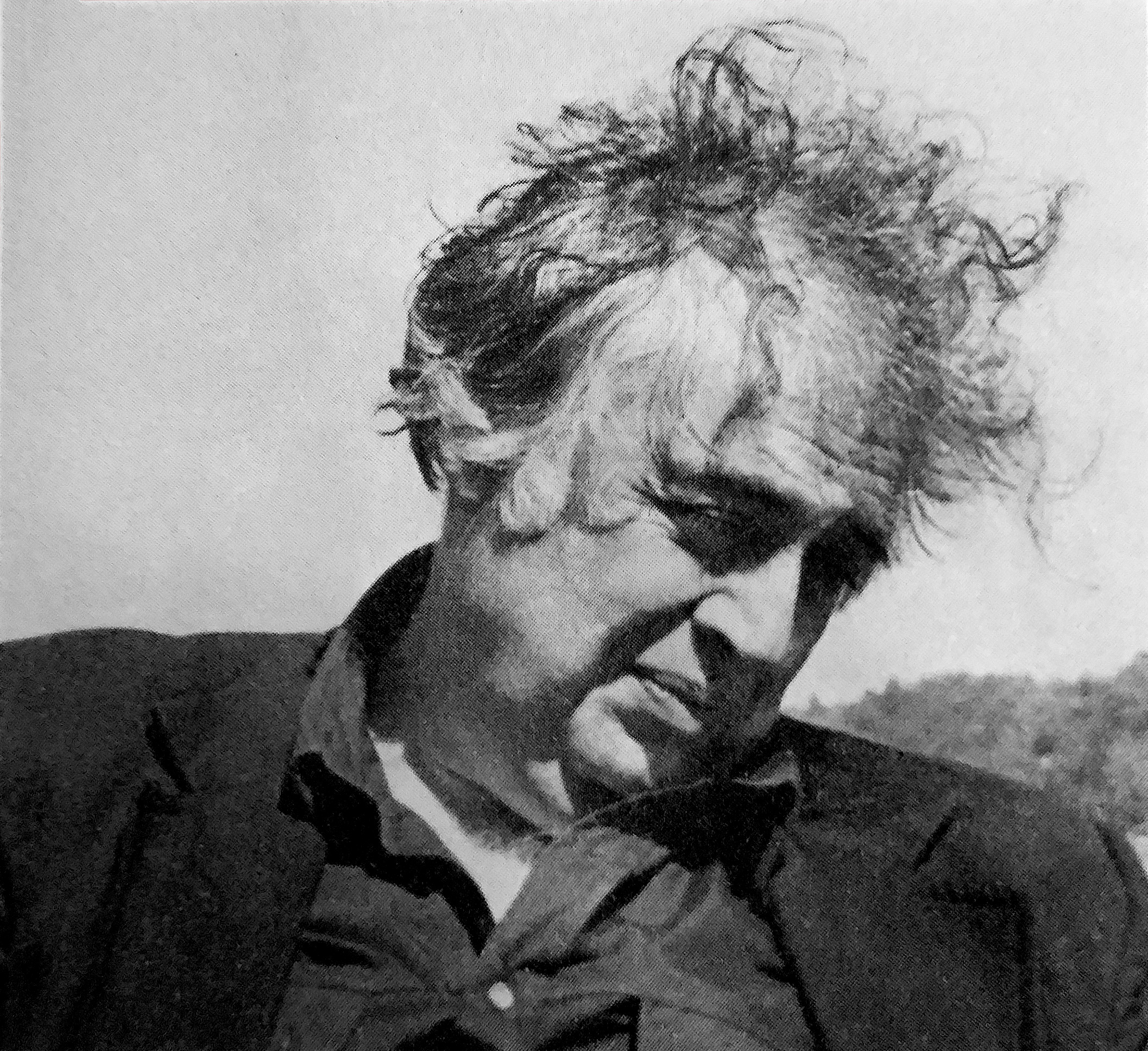
Photo portrait from the dust jacket of Agon: Towards a Theory of Revisionism (1982)

A Map of Misreading picks up where The Anxiety of Influence left off, making several adjustments to Bloom's system of revisionary ratios. Kabbalah and Criticism attempts to invoke the esoteric interpretive system of the Lurianic Kabbalah, as explicated by scholar Gershom Scholem, as an alternate system of mapping the path of poetic influence. Figures of Capable Imagination collected odd pieces Bloom had written in the process of composing his "influence" books.

Bloom continued to write about influence theory throughout the 1970s and '80s, and penned little thereafter that did not invoke his ideas about influence.

=== Novel experiment ===
Bloom's fascination with David Lindsay's fantasy novel A Voyage to Arcturus led him to take a brief break from criticism to compose a sequel to it. This novel, The Flight to Lucifer, was Bloom's only work of fiction.

=== Religious criticism ===
Bloom then entered a phase of what he called "religious criticism", beginning with Ruin the Sacred Truths: Poetry and Belief from the Bible to the Present (1989). In The Book of J (1990), he and David Rosenberg (who translated the biblical texts) portrayed one of the posited ancient documents that formed the basis of the first five books of the Bible (see documentary hypothesis) as the work of a great literary artist who had no intention of composing a dogmatically religious work (see Jahwist). They envisaged this anonymous writer as a woman attached to the court of the successors of the Israelite kings David and Solomon – a piece of speculation that drew much attention. Later, Bloom said that the speculations did not go far enough, and perhaps he should have identified J with the biblical Bathsheba. In Jesus and Yahweh: The Names Divine (2004), he revisits some of the territory covered in The Book of J in discussing the significance of Yahweh and Jesus of Nazareth as literary characters, while casting a critical eye on historical approaches and asserting the fundamental incompatibility of Christianity and Judaism.

In The American Religion (1992), Bloom surveyed the major varieties of Protestant and post-Protestant religious faiths that originated in the United States and argued that, in terms of their psychological hold on their adherents, most had more in common with gnosticism than with historical Christianity. The exception was the Jehovah's Witnesses, whom Bloom regards as non-Gnostic. He elsewhere predicted that the Mormon and Pentecostal strains of American Christianity would overtake mainstream Protestant divisions in popularity in the next few decades. In Omens of Millennium (1996), Bloom identifies these American religious elements as on the periphery of an old – and not inherently Christian – gnostic, religious tradition that invokes a complex of ideas and experiences concerning angelology, interpretation of dreams as prophecy, near-death experiences, and millennialism.

In his essay in "The Gospel of Thomas", Bloom writes that none of the Aramaic sayings in the Gospel of Thomas have survived in the original language. Marvin Meyer generally agreed and further confirmed that the earlier versions of that text were likely written in either Aramaic or Greek. Meyer ends his introduction with an endorsement of much of Bloom's essay. Bloom notes the otherworldliness of the Jesus in Thomas's sayings by making reference to "the paradox also of the American Jesus".

=== The Western Canon ===
The Western Canon (1994), a survey of the major literary works of Europe and the Americas since the 14th century, focuses on 26 works Bloom considers sublime and representative of their nations and of the Western canon. Besides analyses of the canon's various representative works, Bloom's major concern in the volume was to reclaim literature from what he called the "School of Resentment", the mostly academic critics who espoused a social purpose in their work. Bloom asserted that the goals of reading must be solitary aesthetic pleasure and self-insight rather than the goal of improving one's society held by "forces of resentment". He cast the latter as absurd, writing: "The idea that you benefit the insulted and injured by reading someone of their own origins rather than reading Shakespeare is one of the oddest illusions ever promoted by or in our schools." His position was that politics had no place in literary criticism: that a feminist or Marxist reading of Hamlet would tell us something about feminism and Marxism but probably nothing about Hamlet.

In addition to considering how much influence a writer had had on later writers, Bloom proposed the concept of "canonical strangeness" (cf. uncanny) as a benchmark of a literary work's merit. The Western Canon also included a list – noted by the general public with widespread interest – of the Western works from antiquity to the present that Bloom considered either permanent members of the canon of literary classics, or candidates for that status. Bloom said that he made the list off the top of his head at his editor's request, and that he did not stand by it.

=== Work on Shakespeare ===
External videos
- Presentation by Bloom on Shakespeare: The Invention of the Human, December 10, 1998, C-SPAN

William Shakespeare (1564–1616)

Bloom had a deep appreciation for William Shakespeare, considering him the supreme center of the Western canon. The first edition of The Anxiety of Influence almost completely avoided Shakespeare, whom Bloom then considered barely touched by the psychological drama of anxiety. The second edition, published in 1997, added a long preface that mostly expounded Shakespeare's debt to Ovid and Chaucer, and his agon with Christopher Marlowe, who set the stage for him by breaking free of ecclesiastical and moralizing overtones.

In his later survey, Shakespeare: The Invention of the Human (1998), Bloom provided an analysis of each of Shakespeare's 38 plays, "twenty-four of which are masterpieces". Written as a companion to the general reader and theater-goer, Bloom declared that bardolatry "ought to be even more a secular religion than it already is". He also contended in the work that Shakespeare "invented" humanity, in that he prescribed the now-common practice of "overhearing" ourselves, which drives our changes. The two paragons of his theory were Sir John Falstaff and Prince Hamlet, whom Bloom saw as representing self-satisfaction and self-loathing, respectively. Bloom called those two characters, along with Iago and Cleopatra, "the four Shakespearean characters most inexhaustible to meditation".

Bloom followed up his major book on Shakespeare with a supplemental book extending his study of Hamlet. The supplemental book on Hamlet was then further extended with separate volumes examining the major personalities in Shakespeare, including a volume each for Cleopatra, Macbeth, Lear, Iago, and Falstaff.

=== 2000s and 2010s ===
External videos
- Booknotes interview with Bloom on How to Read and Why, September 3, 2000, C-SPAN

Bloom consolidated his work on the Western canon with the publication of How to Read and Why (2000) and Genius: A Mosaic of One Hundred Exemplary Creative Minds (2003). Hamlet: Poem Unlimited (also 2003) is an amendment to Shakespeare: Invention of the Human written after Bloom decided the chapter on Hamlet in the earlier book had been too focused on the textual question of the Ur-Hamlet to cover his most central thoughts on the play itself. Some elements of religious criticism were combined with his secular criticism in Where Shall Wisdom Be Found (2004), and a more complete return to religious criticism was marked by the publication of Jesus and Yahweh: The Names Divine (2005). Throughout the decade he also compiled, edited and introduced several major anthologies of poetry.

Bloom took part in Paul Festa's 2006 documentary Apparition of the Eternal Church. It centers on people's reactions to hearing for the first time Olivier Messiaen's organ piece Apparition de l'église éternelle.

Bloom began a book under the working title Living Labyrinth, centering on Shakespeare and Walt Whitman, which was published as The Anatomy of Influence: Literature as a Way of Life (2011).

In July 2011, after the publication of The Anatomy of Influence and after finishing work on The Shadow of a Great Rock, Bloom was working on three further projects:

- Achievement in the Evening Land from Emerson to Faulkner, a history of American literature following the canonical model, which ultimately developed into his book The Daemon Knows: Literary Greatness and the American Sublime (2015).
- The Hum of Thoughts Evaded in the Mind: A Literary Memoir, which ultimately developed into his book Possessed by Memory: The Inward Light of Criticism (2019), the last book Bloom published during his lifetime.
- a play with the working title Walt Whitman: A Musical Pageant. By November 2011, Bloom had changed the title to To You Whoever You Are: A Pageant Celebrating Walt Whitman. This work is unpublished and it is unknown how much of it was finished.

Bloom was an outspoken critic of both the Harry Potter books and the works of Stephen King; he believed their popularity signified a dumbing down of American culture.

== Influence ==
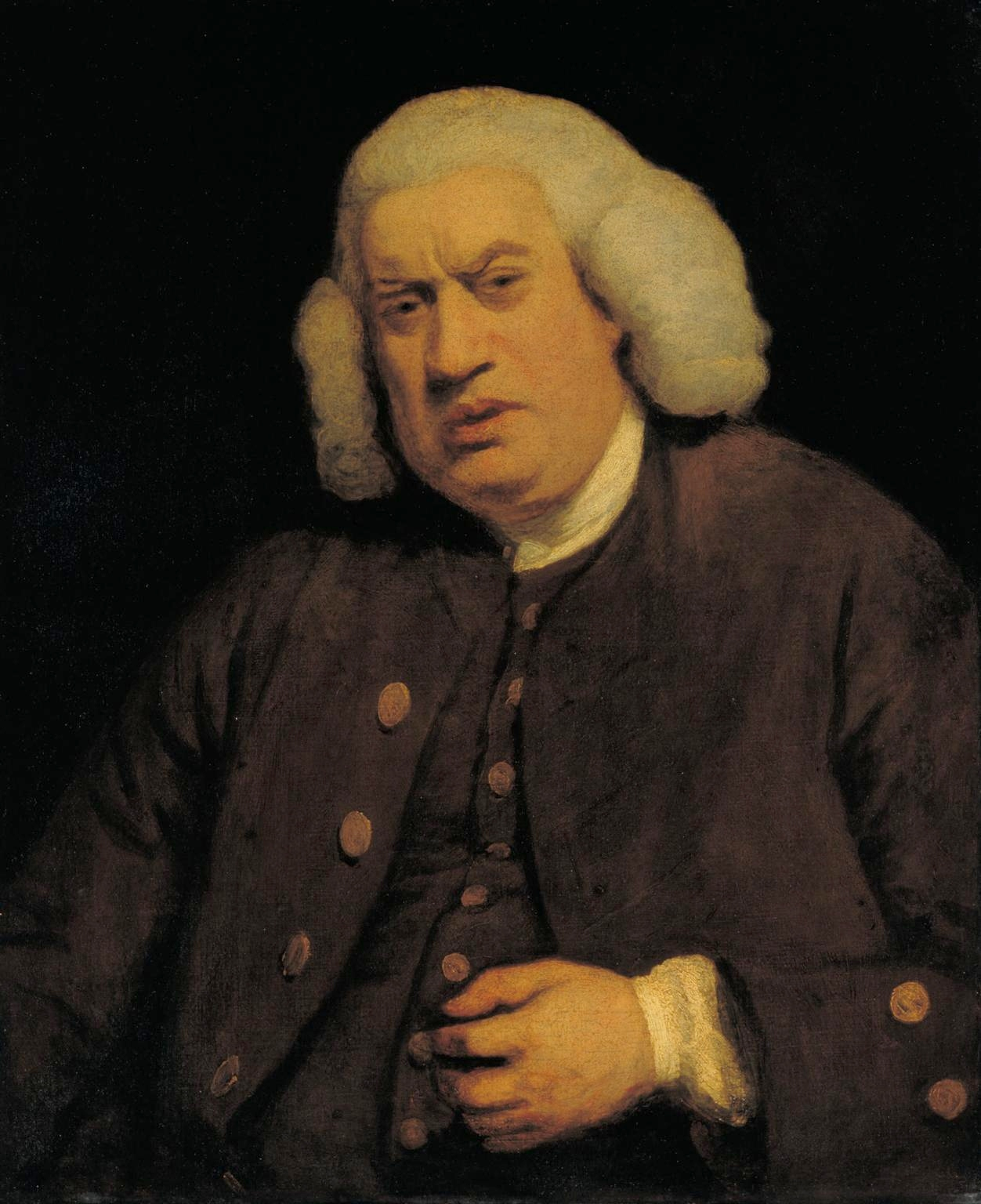
In The Western Canon, Bloom claimed that Samuel Johnson was "unmatched by any critic in any nation before or after him".

In 1986, Bloom credited Northrop Frye as his nearest precursor. He told Imre Salusinszky in 1986: "In terms of my own theorizations ... the precursor proper has to be Northrop Frye. I purchased and read Fearful Symmetry a week or two after it had come out and reached the bookstore in Ithaca, New York. It ravished my heart away. I have tried to find an alternative father in Mr. Kenneth Burke, who is a charming fellow and a very powerful critic, but I don't come from Burke, I come out of Frye."

But in Anatomy of Influence (2011), Bloom wrote, "I no longer have the patience to read anything by Frye" and nominated Angus Fletcher among his living contemporaries as his "critical guide and conscience". Elsewhere that year, he recommended Fletcher's Colors of the Mind and M. H. Abrams's The Mirror and the Lamp. In this late phase, Bloom also emphasized the tradition of earlier critics such as William Hazlitt, Ralph Waldo Emerson, Walter Pater, A. C. Bradley, and Samuel Johnson, describing Johnson in The Western Canon as "unmatched by any critic in any nation before or after him". In his 2012 foreword to The Fourth Dimension of a Poem (WW Norton, 2012), Bloom indicated the influence Abrams had upon him in his years at Cornell.

Bloom's theory of poetic influence regards the development of Western literature as a process of borrowing and misreading. Writers find their creative inspiration in previous writers and begin by imitating them, but must make their own work different from their precursors'. As a result, Bloom argues, authors of real power must inevitably "misread" their precursors to make room for fresh imaginings.

Observers often identified Bloom with deconstruction, but he never admitted to sharing more than a few ideas with deconstructionists. He told Robert Moynihan in 1983, "What I think I have in common with the school of deconstruction is the mode of negative thinking or negative awareness, in the technical, philosophical sense of the negative, but which comes to me through negative theology ... There is no escape, there is simply the given, and there is nothing that we can do."

Bloom's association with the Western canon provoked a substantial interest in his opinion of the relative importance of contemporary writers. In the late 1980s, Bloom told an interviewer: "Probably the most powerful living Western writer is Samuel Beckett. He's certainly the most authentic."

Of British writers, Bloom said: "Geoffrey Hill is the strongest British poet now active" and "no other contemporary British novelist seems to me to be of Iris Murdoch's eminence". After Murdoch died, Bloom expressed admiration for the novelists Peter Ackroyd, Will Self, John Banville, and A. S. Byatt.

In Genius: A Mosaic of One Hundred Exemplary Creative Minds (2003), he called the Portuguese writer José Saramago "the most gifted novelist alive in the world today" and "one of the last titans of an expiring literary genre".

Of American novelists, Bloom said in 2003, "there are four living American novelists I know of who are still at work and who deserve our praise". Saying that "they write the Style of our Age" and that "each has composed canonical works", he identified them as Thomas Pynchon, Philip Roth, Cormac McCarthy, and Don DeLillo. He named their respective masterpieces as The Crying of Lot 49, Gravity's Rainbow and Mason & Dixon; Sabbath's Theater and American Pastoral; Blood Meridian; and Underworld. He added to this estimate the work of John Crowley, with special interest in his Ægypt tetralogy and novel Little, Big, saying, "only a handful of living writers in English can equal him as a stylist, and most of them are poets ... only Philip Roth consistently writes on Crowley's level". Bloom called Crowley's Little, Big "a neglected masterpiece" and "the most enchanting twentieth-century book I know". He wrote the afterword to a 40th-anniversary edition of the novel. Shortly before his death, Bloom expressed admiration for the works of Joshua Cohen, William Giraldi, and Nell Freudenberger.

In Kabbalah and Criticism (1975), Bloom identified Robert Penn Warren, James Merrill, John Ashbery, and Elizabeth Bishop as the most important living American poets. By the 1990s, he regularly named A. R. Ammons along with Ashbery and Merrill, and he later identified Henri Cole as the crucial American poet of the generation following those three. He expressed great admiration for the Canadian poets Anne Carson, particularly her verse novel Autobiography of Red, and A. F. Moritz, whom Bloom called "a true poet". Bloom also listed Jay Wright as one of only a handful of major living poets and the best living American poet after Ashbery's death.

Bloom's introduction to Modern Critical Interpretations: Thomas Pynchon's Gravity's Rainbow (1986) features his canon of the "twentieth-century American Sublime", the greatest works of American art produced in the 20th century. Playwright Tony Kushner sees Bloom as an important influence on his work.

== Reception ==
Bloom's work has drawn polarized responses, even among established literary scholars. Bloom was called "probably the most celebrated literary critic in the United States". A 1994 New York Times article said that many younger critics see Bloom as an "outdated oddity", whereas a 1998 New York Times article called him "one of the most gifted of contemporary critics".

In an obituary published in The Guardian, Kenan Malik emphasized the significance of Bloom's work while also arguing that it had shortcomings: "Bloom conflated judgment and understanding. We may judge the quality of a literary work in its own terms, but its social, political and historical context nevertheless remains vital in understanding it."

In a highly critical 2002 essay, Joseph Epstein wrote that Bloom seemed to have no "clue about how to produce anything approaching the aesthetically pleasing in his own writing" and had fallen into a pattern of "bombast, rant, and confident obscurity". Epstein concluded that Bloom had "staked out his claim for being a great critic through portentousness, pomposity, and extravagant pretension."

James Wood wrote: "Vatic, repetitious, imprecisely reverential, though never without a peculiar charm of his own—a kind of campiness, in fact—Bloom as a literary critic in the last few years has been largely unimportant." In an interview, Bloom said of Wood: "There are period pieces in criticism as there are period pieces in the novel and in poetry. The wind blows and they will go away... There's nothing to the man... I don't want to talk about him."

In the early 21st century, Bloom often found himself at the center of literary controversy after criticizing popular writers such as Adrienne Rich, Maya Angelou, and David Foster Wallace. In the pages of The Paris Review, he criticized the populist-leaning poetry slam, calling it "the death of art". When Doris Lessing received the Nobel Prize in Literature, he bemoaned the "pure political correctness" of the award to an author of "fourth-rate science fiction", while conceding his appreciation of Lessing's earlier work.

MormonVoices, a group associated with Foundation for Apologetic Information & Research, included Bloom on its Top Ten Anti-Mormon Statements of 2011 list for saying, "The current head of the Mormon Church, Thomas S. Monson, known to his followers as 'prophet, seer and revelator', is indistinguishable from the secular plutocratic oligarchs who exercise power in our supposed democracy." This was despite Bloom's sympathy for Joseph Smith, the founding prophet of Mormonism, whom he called a "religious genius".

== Written works ==
=== Books ===
- Shelley's Mythmaking. New Haven: Yale University Press, 1959.
- The Visionary Company: A Reading of English Romantic Poetry. Garden City, New York: Doubleday, 1961. Revised and enlarged edn. Ithaca: Cornell University Press, 1971.
- Blake's Apocalypse: A Study in Poetic Argument. Anchor Books: New York: Doubleday and Co., 1963.
- The Literary Criticism of John Ruskin.; edited with introduction. New York: DoubleDay, 1965.
- Walter Pater: Marius the Epicurean; edition with introduction. New York: New American Library, 1970.
- Romanticism and Consciousness: Essays in Criticism; edited with introduction. New York: Norton, 1970.
- Yeats. New York: Oxford University Press, 1970. ISBN 0-19-501603-3
- The Ringers in the Tower: Studies in Romantic Tradition. Chicago: University of Chicago Press, 1971.
- The Anxiety of Influence: A Theory of Poetry. New York: Oxford University Press, 1973; 2nd edn, 1997. ISBN 0-19-511221-0
- The Selected Writings of Walter Pater; edition with introduction and notes. New York: New American Library, 1974.
- A Map of Misreading. New York: Oxford University Press, 1975.
- Kabbalah and Criticism. New York : Seabury Press, 1975. ISBN 0-8264-0242-9
- Poetry and Repression: Revisionism from Blake to Stevens. New Haven: Yale University Press, 1976.
- Figures of Capable Imagination. New York: Seabury Press, 1976.
- Wallace Stevens: The Poems of our Climate. Ithaca, New York: Cornell University Press, 1977.
- Deconstruction and Criticism. New York: Seabury Press, 1980.
- The Flight to Lucifer: A Gnostic Fantasy. New York: Vintage Books, 1980. ISBN 0-394-74323-7
- Agon: Towards a Theory of Revisionism. New York: Oxford University Press, 1982.
- The Breaking of the Vessels. Chicago: University of Chicago Press, 1982.
- The strong light of the canonical: Kafka, Freud and Scholem as revisionists of Jewish culture and thought. New York: The City College, 1987.
- The Poetics of Influence: New and Selected Criticism. New Haven: Henry R. Schwab, 1988.
- Ruin the Sacred Truths: Poetry and Belief from the Bible to the Present. Cambridge, Massachusetts: Harvard University Press, 1989.
- The Book of J: Translated from the Hebrew by David Rosenberg; Interpreted by Harold Bloom. New York: Grove Press, 1990 ISBN 0-8021-4191-9
- The Gospel of Thomas: The Hidden Sayings of Jesus; translation with introduction, critical edition of the Coptic text and notes by Marvin Meyer, with an interpretation by Harold Bloom. San Francisco: HarperSanFrancisco, 1992.
- The American Religion: The Emergence of the Post-Christian Nation; Touchstone Books; ISBN 0-671-86737-7 (1992; August 1993)
- The Western Canon: The Books and School of the Ages. New York: Harcourt Brace, 1994.
- Omens of Millennium: The Gnosis of Angels, Dreams, and Resurrection. New York: Riverhead Books, 1996.
- Shakespeare: The Invention of the Human. New York: 1998. ISBN 1-57322-751-X
- How to Read and Why. New York: Scribner, 2000. ISBN 0-684-85906-8
- Stories and Poems for Extremely Intelligent Children of All Ages. New York: 2001.
- El futur de la imaginació (The Future of the Imagination). Barcelona: Anagrama / Empúries, 2002. ISBN 84-7596-927-5
- Genius: A Mosaic of One Hundred Exemplary Creative Minds. New York. 2003. ISBN 0-446-52717-3
- Hamlet: Poem Unlimited. New York. 2003.
- The Best Poems of the English Language: From Chaucer Through Frost. New York. 2004. ISBN 0-06-054041-9
- Where Shall Wisdom Be Found? New York. 2004. ISBN 1-57322-284-4
- Jesus and Yahweh: The Names Divine. 2005. ISBN 1-57322-322-0
- American Religious Poems: An Anthology By Harold Bloom. 2006. ISBN 1-931082-74-X
- Fallen Angels, illustrated by Mark Podwal. Yale University Press, 2007. ISBN 0-300-12348-5
- Till I End My Song: A Gathering of Last Poems Harper, 2010. ISBN 0-06-192305-2
- The Anatomy of Influence: Literature as a Way of Life. Yale University Press, 2011. ISBN 0-300-16760-1
- The Shadow of a Great Rock: A Literary Appreciation of The King James Bible. Yale University Press, 2011. ISBN 0-300-16683-4
- The Daemon Knows: Literary Greatness and the American Sublime. Spiegel & Grau, 2015. ISBN 0-812-99782-4
- Falstaff: Give Me Life. Scribner, 2017. ISBN 978-1-5011-6413-2
- Cleopatra: I Am Fire and Air. Scribner, 2017. ISBN 978-1-5011-6416-3
- Lear: The Great Image of Authority. Scribner, 2018. ISBN 978-1-5011-6419-4
- Iago: The Strategies of Evil. Scribner, 2018. ISBN 978-1-5011-6422-4
- Macbeth: A Dagger of the Mind. Scribner, 2019. ISBN 978-1-5011-6425-5
- Possessed by Memory: The Inward Light of Criticism. Knopf, 2019. ISBN 978-0-5255-2088-7
- The American Canon: Literary Genius from Emerson to Pynchon (ed. David Mikics). Library of America, 2019. ISBN 978-1-5985-3640-9
- Take Arms Against a Sea of Troubles: The Power of the Reader's Mind Over a Universe of Death. Yale, 2020. ISBN 978-0300247282
- The Bright Book of Life: Novels to Read and Re-read. Knopf, 2020. ISBN 978-0525657262

=== Articles ===
- "On Extended Wings"; Wallace Stevens' Longer Poems. By Helen Hennessy Vendler, (Review), The New York Times, October 5, 1969.
- "Poets' meeting in the heyday of their youth; A Single Summer With Lord Byron", The New York Times, February 15, 1970.
- "An angel's spirit in a decaying (and active) body". The New York Times. November 22, 1970. Archived from the original on July 9, 2023.
- "The Use of Poetry". The New York Times. November 12, 1975. Archived from the original on July 9, 2023.
- "Northrop Frye exalting the designs of romance; The Secular Scripture". The New York Times. April 18, 1976. Archived from the original on July 9, 2023.
- "On Solitude in America". The New York Times. August 4, 1977. Archived from the original on July 9, 2023.
- "The Critic/Poet". The New York Times. February 5, 1978. Archived from the original on July 9, 2023.
- "A Fusion of Traditions: The Collected Works of Isaac Rosenberg". The New York Times. July 22, 1979. Archived from the original on July 9, 2023.
- "Straight Forth Out of Self", The New York Times, June 22, 1980.
- "The Heavy Burden of the Past; Poets", The New York Times, January 4, 1981.
- "The Pictures of the Poet; The Painting and Drawings of William Blake, by Martin Butlin. Vol. I, Text. Vol. II, Plates" (review), The New York Times, January 3, 1982.
- "A Novelist's Bible; The Story of the Stories, The Chosen People and Its God. By Dan Jacobson" (review), The New York Times, October 17, 1982.
- "Isaac Bashevis Singer's Jeremiad; The Penitent, By Isaac Bashevis Singer" (review), The New York Times, September 25, 1983.
- "Domestic Derangements; A Late Divorce, By A. B. Yehoshua Translated by Hillel Halkin" (review), The New York Times, February 19, 1984.
- "War Within the Walls; In the Freud Archives, By Janet Malcolm" (review), The New York Times, May 27, 1984.
- "His Long Ordeal by Laughter; Zuckerman Bound, A Trilogy and Epilogue. By Philip Roth" (review), The New York Times, May 19, 1985.
- "A Comedy of Worldly Salvation; The Good Apprentice, By Iris Murdoch" (review), The New York Times, January 12, 1986.
- "Freud, the Greatest Modern Writer" (review), The New York Times, March 23, 1986.
- "Passionate Beholder of America in Trouble; Look Homeward, A Life of Thomas Wolfe. By David Herbert Donald" (review), The New York Times, February 8, 1987.
- "The Book of the Father; The Messiah of Stockholm, By Cynthia Ozick" (review), The New York Times, March 22, 1987.
- "Still Haunted by Covenant". The New York Times. January 31, 1988. Archived from the original on July 9, 2023.
- "New Heyday of Gnostic Heresies". The New York Times. April 26, 1992. Archived from the original on July 9, 2023.
- "A Jew Among the Cossacks; The first English translation of Isaac Babel's journal about his service with the Russian cavalry. 1920 Diary, By Isaac Babel" (review), The New York Times, June 4, 1995.
- "Kaddish; By Leon Wieseltier" (review), The New York Times, October 4, 1998.
- "View; On First Looking into Gates's Crichton", The New York Times, June 4, 2000.
- "What Ho, Malvolio!". The New York Times. December 6, 2000. Archived from the original on July 9, 2023.
- "Macbush" (play), Vanity Fair, April 2004.
- "The Lost Jewish Culture". The New York Review of Books. 54 (11). The New York Review of Books: 44–47. June 28, 2007. Archived from the original on January 5, 2010 – via nybooks.com. [reviews The Dreams of the Poem: Hebrew Poetry from Muslim and Christian Spain, 950–1492, translated, edited, and with an introduction by Peter Cole
- "The Glories of Yiddish". The New York Review of Books. 55 (17). November 6, 2008. Archived from the original on January 5, 2010 – via nybooks.com. [reviews History of the Yiddish Language, by Max Weinreich, edited by Paul Glasser, translated from the Yiddish by Shlomo Noble with the assistance of Joshua A. Fishman]
- "Yahweh Meets R. Crumb". The New York Review of Books. 56 (19). December 3, 2009. Archived from the original on October 4, 2015 – via nybooks.com. [reviews The Book of Genesis, illustrated by R. Crumb]
- "Will This Election Be the Mormon Breakthrough?". The New York Times. November 12, 2011. Archived from the original on June 6, 2023.
- "Richard III: Victim or Monster? Asks Harold Bloom". Newsweek. February 11, 2013. Archived from the original on July 9, 2023.
- "Introduction to The Invention of Influence by Peter Cole". The Tablet. January 21, 2014. Archived from the original on December 3, 2021.

=== Reference series ===
- Bloom's Bio Critiques Series, Bloom's Literary Criticism
- Bloom's Modern Critical Interpretations Series, Bloom's Literary Criticism
- Bloom's Major Short Story Writers Series, Bloom's Literary Criticism

== See also ==
- Covering cherub
- List of thinkers influenced by deconstruction
- School of resentment
