= National Museum of American Religion =

The National Museum of American Religion (NMAR) is a non-profit organization headquartered in Purcellville, Virginia. Founded in 2014 by Christopher Stevenson, Darin Lowder, and Rob Wilson-Black, the organization’s goal is to create a private, digital-first museum dedicated to highlighting the role religion has played in shaping the social, political, economic, and cultural fabric of American life.

== Background ==
The museum’s planned exhibits would reveal the impact of individuals, institutions, and movements whose religious beliefs and values have impacted the broader history of the United States. The museum’s mission, as outlined in its master planning documents, is to tell the story of how religion has shaped America and how America has shaped religion, such as through the establishment of religious freedom in the U.S. Constitution’s Article VI and Bill of Rights religion clauses.”

The museum was invited to participate in the 2023 Smithsonian Folklife Festival, "Creative Encounters: Living Religions in the U.S.," by hosting panels featuring scholars discussing the history of religious freedom in the United States.

Since 2020, NMAR has hosted the podcast Religion in the American Experience.
