= Covering cherub =

Covering cherub (in literary usage) is the obstructing presence for the artist of the inherited tradition, and cultural predecessors, with which they are faced.

== Origins ==
Found originally in Ezekiel, the covering cherub was adapted for use by, among others, both Milton and William Blake. In the Blakean vision, the covering cherub was a composite but always negative figure of truth's guardian turned destructive, of a cruel and hardened Selfhood; and it was from Blake that in 1967 Harold Bloom derived his concept of the covering cherub as a literary/cultural barrier. Apparently, a waking nightmare he experienced gave rise first to his poem on the subject, "The Covering Cherub", and eventually to his book The Anxiety of Influence.

== Thematics ==
For Bloom, "the Covering Cherub then is a demon of continuity...cultural history, the dead poets, the embarrassments of a tradition grown too wealthy to need anything more". Bloom considered the artistic struggle in Freudian terms, as a filial contest with a father figure carrying cultural authority – an Oedipal conflict with a superego either originally modelled on a cultural hero or influenced subsequently by such an ideal model.

Though initially referencing a patriarchal father/son interaction, the concept of the covering cherub has also been applied to works by women writers such as Angela Carter and Virginia Woolf.

== Criticism ==
Some critics have seen Bloom's central image as too open-ended to serve as an analytical tool, a vague series of analogies only tenuously working as Bloom desired.

== See also ==
- Anxiety of Authorship
- Artaud
- High culture
- Northrop Frye
- Tharmas
- Wallace Stevens
- Western canon
