= Weston (surname) =

Weston is a surname. Notable people with the name include:

- Alf Weston, English rugby league footballer of the 1970s
- Anthony Weston (born 1954), American philosopher and author
- Arthur Weston (priest), Australian Anglican priest
- Aylmer Hunter-Weston (1864–1940), British general and politician
- Bob Weston (born 1965), American musician
- Bob Weston (guitarist) (1947–2012), English guitarist
- Brett Weston (1911–1993), American photographer
- Cameron Weston (born 2000), American baseball player
- Celia Weston, American actress
- Charles Weston, 3rd Earl of Portland (1639–1665)
- Charles Weston (horticulturalist) (1866–1935), active in Eastern states of Australia
- Charles Weston (Royal Navy officer) (1922–1999), president of the Royal Naval College, Greenwich
- Charles Weston (priest), Anglican cleric
- Curtis Weston (born 1987), English footballer
- Daniel Weston (born 1983), German cricketer
- David Weston (actor) (born 1938), English actor, director and author
- David Weston (artist) (1935–2011), British industrial artist and author
- David Weston (cricketer) (1930–1977), New Zealand cricketer
- David E. Weston (1929–2001), English acoustician
- David John Weston (1898–?), World War I flying ace
- Denny Weston Jr., American drummer, composer, and songwriter
- Doug Weston (c. 1926/27–1999), American nightclub owner
- Dwain Weston (1973–2003), Australian skydiver
- Edward Weston (disambiguation), several people, including
  - Edward Weston (1886–1958), American photographer
  - Edward Weston (chemist) (1850–1936), American chemist
  - Edward Weston (pastoralist), Australian settler
  - Edward Weston (politician) (1703–1770), British politician
  - Edward Weston (priest) (1566–1635), English priest
  - Edward Burbank Weston (1846–1918), American archer
  - Edward Payson Weston (1839–1929), American pedestrian
- Eugene Weston Jr, Los Angeles architect
- Ezra Weston II (1772–1842), American shipbuilder, also known as King Caesar
- Francis Weston (c. 1513 – 1536), English royal attendant
- Galen Weston (1940–2021), Canadian businessman, son of W.G. Weston
- Galen Weston, Jr. (born 1972), son of Galen Weston and head of Loblaws
- Garry Weston (1927–2002), Canadian-born British businessman, son of W.G. Weston
- George Weston (1864–1924), founder of Weston Bakeries
- George Weston (physicist) (1925–2009), English physicist
- George G. Weston (born 1964), British businessman, son of Garry Weston
- Guy Weston (born 1960), British businessman, son of Garry Weston
- Harold Weston (1894–1972), American modernist painter
- Harold Weston Jr. (born 1952), American boxer
- Harry Weston (1928–2008), British basketball player, brother of Stanley
- Harry J. Weston (1874–1955), Australian painter
- Hilary Weston (1942–2025), Irish-born Canadian businesswoman and politician
- Jack Weston (1924–1996), American actor
- James A. Weston (1827–1895), American politician
- Jerome Weston, 2nd Earl of Portland (1605–1662), English nobleman
- Jessie Weston (scholar) (1850–1928), British writer on Arthurian legend
- Jessie Weston (writer) (1867–1939), New Zealand novelist and journalist
- Joan Weston (1935–1997), American roller derby athlete
- John Weston (disambiguation), several people
- Joseph Dodge Weston (1822–1895), English merchant, shipping magnate and politician
- Joseph Fegan Weston (1893–1963), Los Angeles architect
- Kathy Weston (born 1958), American middle-distance runner
- Kim Weston (born 1939), American soul singer
- Kris Weston (born 1972), British electronic musician
- Leslie Weston (1896–1975), British actor
- Margaret Weston (1926–2021), British museum director
- Maria Weston Chapman (1806–1885), American abolitionist
- Martin Weston (born 1959), English cricketer
- Michael Weston (born 1973), American actor
- Mildred Weston (1892–1975) American author and composer
- Neville Weston (1936–2017), English Australian artist and art historian
- Pamela Weston (1921–2009), British clarinettist
- Paul Weston (1912–1996), American music arranger
- Paul Weston (footballer) (born 1957), Australian rules footballer
- Paul Weston (politician) (born 1964), Political activist
- Percy Weston (1852–1905), played football for England in 1871 and 1872
- Peter Weston (1943–2017), English businessman and organizer of science fiction symposia
- Phil Weston (born 1973), English cricketer
- Rae Weston, New Zealand professor of banking and management
- Randy Weston (1926–2018), American jazz pianist
- Rhys Weston (born 1980), Welsh footballer
- Richard Weston (disambiguation), several people
- Riley Weston (born 1967), American actress
- Roswell Weston (1774–1861), New York politician and judge
- Roz Weston (born 1974), Canadian television personality
- R. P. Weston (1878–1936), English songwriter
- Samuel Weston (politician) (died 1716), English politician
- Simon Weston (born 1961), Welsh soldier and Falkland Islands veteran
- Stanley Weston né Weinburger (1919–2002), American sports magazine publisher
- Stanley Weston (basketball) (1923–2000), British basketballer, brother of Harry
- Stephen Weston (1665–1742), English bishop and educator
- Stephen Weston (F.R.S.) (1747–1830), English linguist, poet, and translator
- Steve Weston (1940–1985), Canadian actor
- Thomas Weston (disambiguation), several people
- Tim Weston (born 1982), New Zealand cricketer
- Tommy Weston (1895–1952), English footballer who played for Aston Villa and Stoke City
- Tony Weston (footballer, born 1946), English footballer
- Tony Weston (footballer, born 2003), English footballer
- W. Garfield Weston (1898–1978), Canadian businessman and former British MP
- Walter Weston (1861–1940), English clergyman and mountaineer
- William Weston (disambiguation), several people

== Fictional characters ==
- Levi Weston, protagonist in Power Rangers Ninja Steel
- Paul Weston (In Treatment), a character from the American television series In Treatment
- Professor Weston, the great physicist who invented space travel in Out of the Silent Planet, a Science Fiction novel by C.S. Lewis

== See also ==
- Weston (disambiguation)
- Weston family
- Westons (disambiguation)
