= Weston =

Weston may refer to:

== Places ==
=== Australia ===
- Weston, Australian Capital Territory, a suburb of Canberra
- Weston, New South Wales
- Weston Park, Canberra, a park

=== Canada ===
- Weston, Nova Scotia
- Weston, Toronto, Ontario
  - Weston GO Station, a GO Transit station
- Weston, Winnipeg
- Weston Island, an uninhabited island in James Bay

=== United Kingdom ===
- Weston, Berkshire
- Weston, Cheshire East, a village
- Weston, Runcorn, Cheshire
- Weston-on-Trent, Derbyshire
- Weston, Devon
- Weston, Dorset
- Weston-sub-Edge, Gloucestershire
- Weston, East Hampshire, Hampshire
- Weston, Southampton, Hampshire, a suburb
  - Weston Secondary School
- Weston, Herefordshire
- Weston under Penyard, Herefordshire
- Weston, Hertfordshire
- Weston, Lincolnshire
- Weston Longville, Norfolk
- Weston, Northamptonshire
- Weston by Welland, Northamptonshire
- Weston, North Yorkshire
- Weston, Nottinghamshire
- Weston-on-the-Green, Oxfordshire
- Weston Rhyn, Shropshire
- Weston-under-Redcastle, Shropshire
- Weston, Bath, Somerset
- Weston in Gordano, Somerset
- Weston-super-Mare, Somerset
- Weston, Staffordshire (near Stafford)
- Weston Coyney, Staffordshire
- Weston-under-Lizard, Staffordshire
- Weston, Suffolk
- Weston-on-Avon, Warwickshire
- Weston under Wetherley, Warwickshire

=== United States ===
- Weston, Colorado
- Weston, Connecticut, a New England town
  - Weston (CDP), Connecticut, the main village in the town
- Weston (Middletown, Delaware), a historic home and farm
- Weston, Florida
- Weston, Georgia
- Weston, Idaho
- Weston, DuPage County, Illinois, defunct, grounds of Fermilab
- Weston, McLean County, Illinois
- Weston, Iowa
- Weston, Kentucky
- Weston, Louisiana
- Weston, Maine
- Weston, Massachusetts
- Weston, Michigan
- Weston, Missouri
- Weston, Nebraska
- Weston, New Jersey
- Weston Mills, New York
- New Weston, Ohio
- Weston, Ohio
- Weston, Oregon
- Weston, Pennsylvania
- Weston, Texas
- Weston, Vermont
- Weston, Washington
- Weston (Casanova, Virginia), a historic home and farm
- Weston, West Virginia
- Weston, Wisconsin (disambiguation)
- Weston, Wyoming
- Weston County, Wyoming

=== Other places ===
- Weston, Sabah, Malaysia, a small town
- Weston, New Zealand, a town
- Weston Airport, near Dublin, Ireland

== Businesses ==
- George Weston Limited, a Canadian food production and distribution company
- J. M. Weston, a French shoe company
- Weston Electrical Instrument Corporation, a company founded by Edward Weston
- Weston & Weston, a former architecture film in Los Angeles

== Other uses ==
- Weston (surname), people with the surname Weston
- Weston (band), a pop-punk/indie band from Pennsylvania
- Weston-super-Mare A.F.C., a semi-professional football club in Weston-super-Mare, Somerset, England
- Weston Workers Bears FC, a football club in Weston, New South Wales, Australia
- Weston (software), the reference implementation of a Wayland compositor
- Weston cell, an electrochemical element

== See also ==
- George Weston Foods, an Australian food company
- George Weston (disambiguation)
- Westons (disambiguation)
