= Michael Weston (disambiguation) =

Michael or Mike Weston may refer to:

== Real people ==
- Michael Weston (born Michael Rubinstein; 1973–), American television and film actor
- Mike Weston (Michael Philip Weston; 1938–2023), English rugby union player and captain
- Sir Michael Weston (British diplomat), the 1990–1992 ambassador of the United Kingdom to Kuwait, the Chairperson of the Advisory Group of the Preparatory Commission for the Comprehensive Nuclear-Test-Ban Treaty Organization, etc.
- Michael Weston (swimmer), mentioned in various other pages
- Michael Weston, past member of English band The Lilac Time
- Michael Weston, contributor to the development of Pandora (computer)

== Fictional characters ==
The actor's name is in parentheses when applicable.

- Mike Weston (Thomas Ian Griffith), in Behind Enemy Lines (1997 film), American action movie
- Michael Weston, in Bleeding Hearts (Harvey novel), 1994 crime novel by Ian Rankin
- Mike Weston (Bill Owen), in Carry On Regardless, 1961 British comedy film
- § Mike Weston (Shawn Ashmore), in The Following, 2013–2015 American TV drama series
- Mike Weston, in Naked Came the Manatee, 1996 novel by thirteen Florida writers
- Mike Weston (Danny Walters), in episode 3 "War Machine" of Our World War, 2014 British TV mini-series

== See also ==
- Michael Westen, main character of television series Burn Notice
- Mike Western, a British comics artist
