= Weston Centre =

Weston Centre may refer to:

== Buildings ==
- Weston Centre (San Antonio) in San Antonio, Texas, USA
- Weston Centre (Toronto) in Toronto, Ontario, Canada

== See also ==
- Weston Creek Centre, Australian Capital Territory
- Weston Center, Connecticut, USA
