= Westons =

Westons or Weston's may refer to:

- Weston's Cider, Herefordshire, England
- Westons Mill Pond, East Brunswick, New Jersey, United States
- Weston's Music Hall, London, England
- George Weston Limited, a Canadian food production and distribution company

== See also ==
- Weston (disambiguation)
- Weston (surname), disambiguation
