= Kettle Creek Historic District =

Historic district in Connecticut, United States

- U.S. National Register of Historic Places
- U.S. Historic district
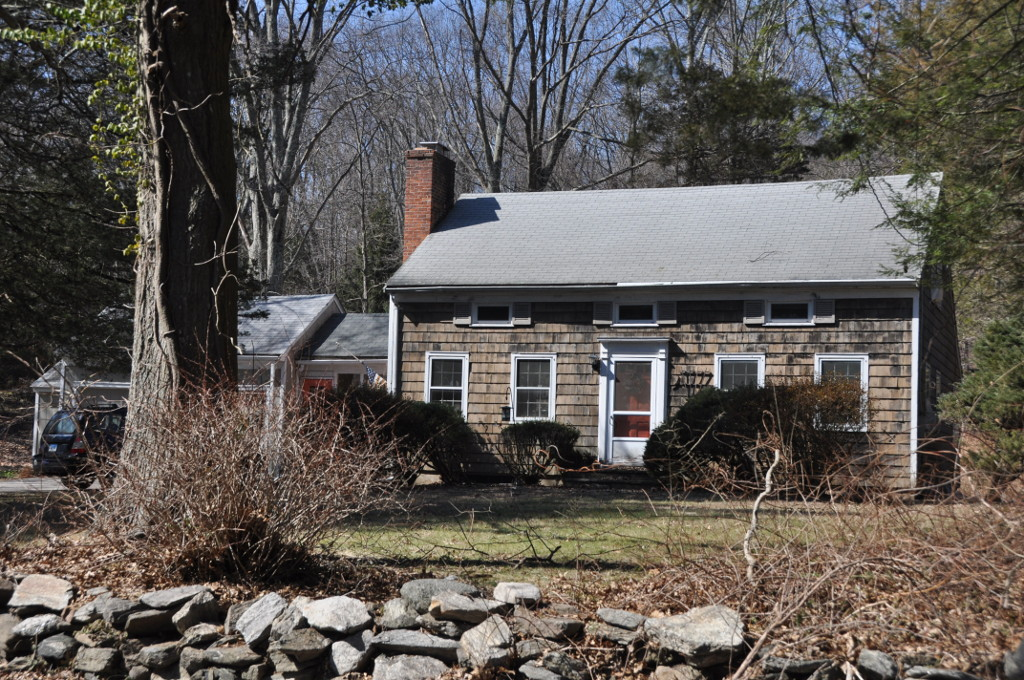

- Location within Connecticut Location within the United States
- Location: Roughly, Weston and Old Weston Road, North of Broad Street, Weston, Connecticut
- Coordinates: 41°11′12″N 73°22′15″W
- Area: 15 acres (6.1 ha)
- Architectural style: Colonial Revival, Colonial, Post Medieval English
- NRHP reference No.: 95001348
- Added to NRHP: November 22, 1995

The Kettle Creek Historic District encompasses one of the earliest settlement areas of the town of Weston, Connecticut. It consists of a small crossroads village center, extending north from the Junction of Weston Road (Connecticut Route 57) and Broad Street to the Junction with Old Weston Road, and includes a small number of well-preserved 18th and 19th-century houses. It was listed on the National Register of Historic Places in 1985.

== Description and history ==
The Kettle Creek district is located south of Weston's current town center, and takes its name from an eponymous brook, and a historic school district. It is a basically linear district extending along Weston Road, and includes four houses, three on the west side of the road and one on the east. Three of the houses were built before 1800, two of which are Capes and one of which is a Dutch Colonial. The fourth house is an early Colonial Revival structure, built in 1895. Each of the properties has one or more outbuildings, including several 19th-century barns and an early (c. 1920) automobile garage.

Weston's colonial settlement history begins in the 18th century, when the area was part of Fairfield. It developed as a dispersed collection of farmsteads, mostly located along area waterways. Weston Road was a principal north–south route, joining coastal communities to Danbury further north. Scribner's Tavern, which survives in part in one of the older homes in this district, was a major stop on that stagecoach route. In the 19th century, the village was substantial enough to include a post office, store, and blacksmith's shop.

== See also ==
- National Register of Historic Places listings in Fairfield County, Connecticut
