= John Curran (financial journalist) =

John Jude Curran (November 21, 1953 – July 5, 2013) was an American financial journalist and editor. Curran was a journalist at Fortune magazine from 1978 to 1998. He then served as the editor of Mutual Fund magazine from 1998 until the publication's closure in 2003. He joined Bloomberg News in 2010, working as a senior writer and editor for Bloomberg Markets magazine. He also appeared as a regular business commentator on NBC News at Sunrise for ten years.

Curran was born in the Bronx, New York, on November 21, 1953, to John Francis and Catherine Curran. His father worked for Kraft Foods as a marketing executive. Curran was raised in White Plains, New York. He attended Catholic schools and received a bachelor's degree in languages and literature from Bard College in 1975.

Curran joined the staff of Fortune magazine as a journalist in 1978. He focused on Wall Street, banking, business and international economics. He received the Overseas Press Club award in 1988 for his reports on Japan.

He left Fortune in 1998 to become the editor of the now defunct Mutual Fund magazine. He was the recipient of the Time Inc. Luce Award in 2001 for commissioning a story on international terrorism, which was published six months before the September 11th terrorist attacks. Mutual Fund, a Time Inc. publication, was closed in 2003.

He joined Bloomberg News in 2010 as a senior journalist for Bloomberg Markets magazine. Curran then became the news director at Bloomberg.com.

Curran died aged 59 at home in Weston, Connecticut, on July 5, 2013, after suffering from amyotrophic lateral sclerosis (ALS), or Lou Gehrig's disease, for 14 months. He was survived by his wife, Joan, and their four children, Alissa, Alexandra, Joanna, and John Richard.
