= Angelo and Ettore Rossetti =

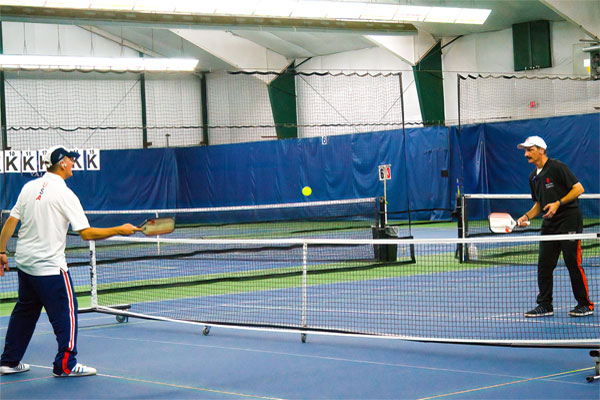
The Rossetti brothers pass the 15K milestone on their way to a new Guinness World Record for the Longest pickleball rally in 2021

Angelo and Ettore Rossetti are identical twin brothers from Connecticut known for setting three Guinness World Records in racket sports.

The Rossetti brothers are the current record holders for the longest tennis volley rally and the longest pickleball rally. Their most recent record was set on October 10, 2021, when they rallied a pickleball 16,046 times in Rocky Hill, Connecticut. The rally went on for six hours and 11 minutes.

A record they no longer hold is for the longest tennis rally, which they set from the baseline at 25,944 strokes in 2008.

In Weston, Connecticut in 2015 the twins made an attempt to regain their tennis rally record, which if successful would have won $1,000,000 for Save the Children, through an annuity put up by a promotions company. The new world record they needed to beat was 50,970 strokes, set by a pair from Germany. For their record attempt the brothers rallied with volleys rather than from the baseline as the task was time limited. At the 5 hour and 28 minute mark, after 30,579 strokes, the ball was hit into the net. The rally fell short of the Germans' tally but set a Guinness World Record for tennis volleys.

== See also ==
- Vicki Nelson-Dunbar and Jean Hepner, holders of the longest rally in professional tennis
