= Bradley Edge Tool Company Historic District =

Historic district in Connecticut, United States

- U.S. National Register of Historic Places
- U.S. Historic district
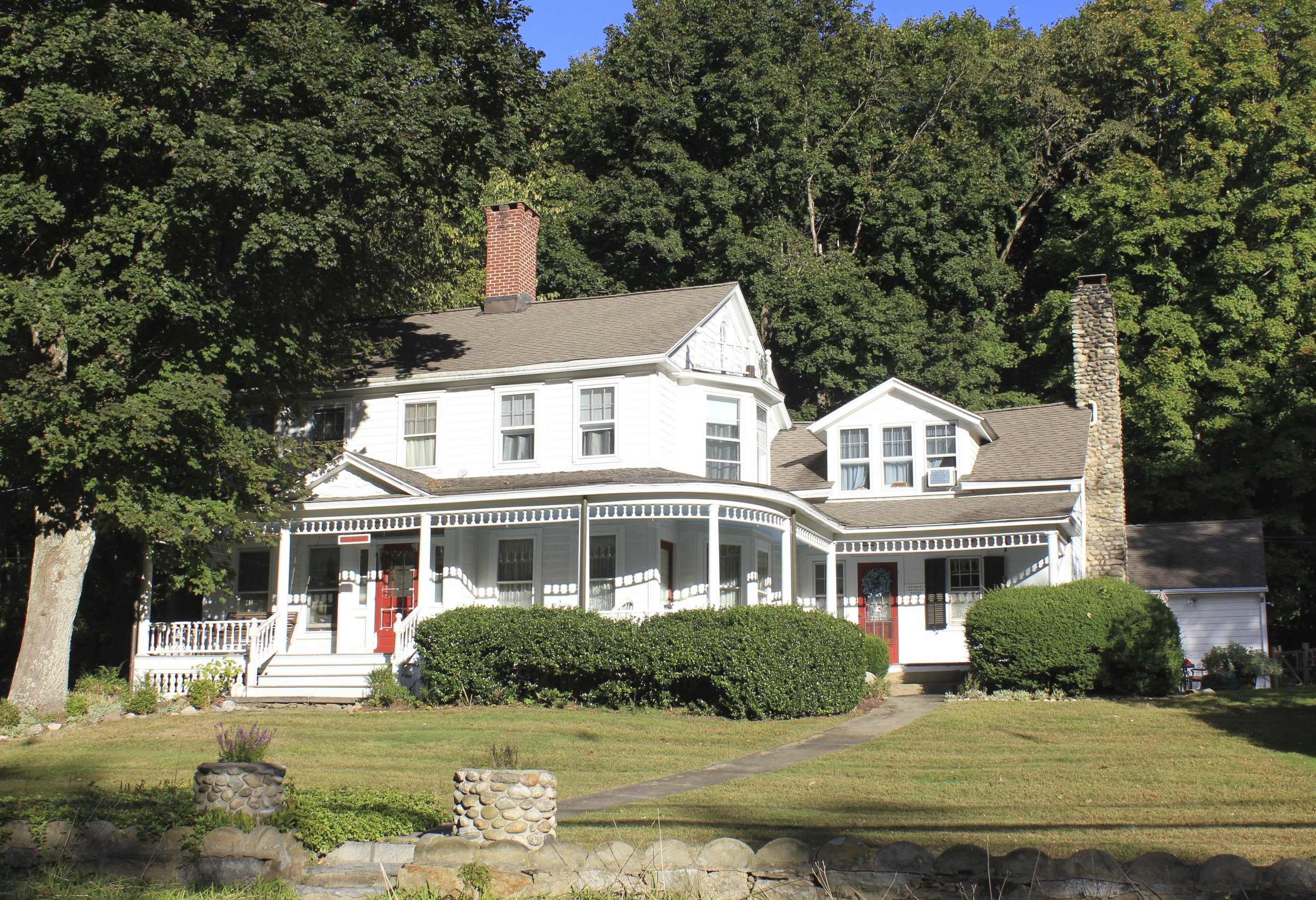
- Gershom W. Bradley House

- Location within Connecticut Location within the United States
- Location: Roughly, Lyons Plains Road North and South of Junction with White Birch Road, Weston, Connecticut
- Coordinates: 41°11′52″N 73°21′13″W
- Area: 30 acres (12 ha)
- Architectural style: Greek Revival, Italianate, Colonial Revival
- NRHP reference No.: 95001347
- Added to NRHP: November 22, 1995

The Bradley Edge Tool Company Historic District encompasses the surviving remnants of a historic 19th-century industrial village in Weston, Connecticut. Extending along Lyons Plain Road near White Birch Road and the Saugatuck River, the area was home to the Bradley Edge Tool Company, which flourished here between 1834 and 1870. The principal surviving elements are residences which were built for the owners and workers of the company; the factory itself burned in 1911. The district was listed on the National Register of Historic Places in 1995.

== Description and history ==
The Bradley Edge Tool Company Historic District is located in southeastern Weston, in what is now a rural-suburban setting. It is centered on the junction of White Birch Road and Lyons Plain Road, extending for about 1/3 mile in each direction along the latter roadway. It is about 30 acres (12 ha) in size, with more the 30 historically significant buildings. All are residential in nature, built with wood framing, and finished in vernacular styles of the mid-19th century. Some of the houses were built by the Bradleys for their workers, while the house of owner Miles Bradley (1859) is one of the best examples of Italianate architecture in the district.

The Bradley Edge Tool Company was founded in 1834 by Gershom W. Bradley, on a site that previously hosted a comb factory. The company manufactured farm implements, and came in later years to specialize in tools for use on Southern plantations. Increasing urban industrialization and a high cost of transportation led to a decline in the company's fortunes after 1870. The factory was sold by the Bradleys in 1909, and burned down in 1911. In addition to the surviving houses, archaeological elements of the factory also remain.

Contributing properties include:

- the Gershom W. Bradley House, with a Greek Revival style doorway (see accompanying photo #1)
- the Miles Bradley House, an "exceptional example of Italianate architecture", has unusual "double bullseye windows" (see photos #3,4)
- the Osborne House, apparently originally Greek Revival but given a Colonial Revival portico later
- the Lockwood House, a "three-quarter house" (see photo #13)
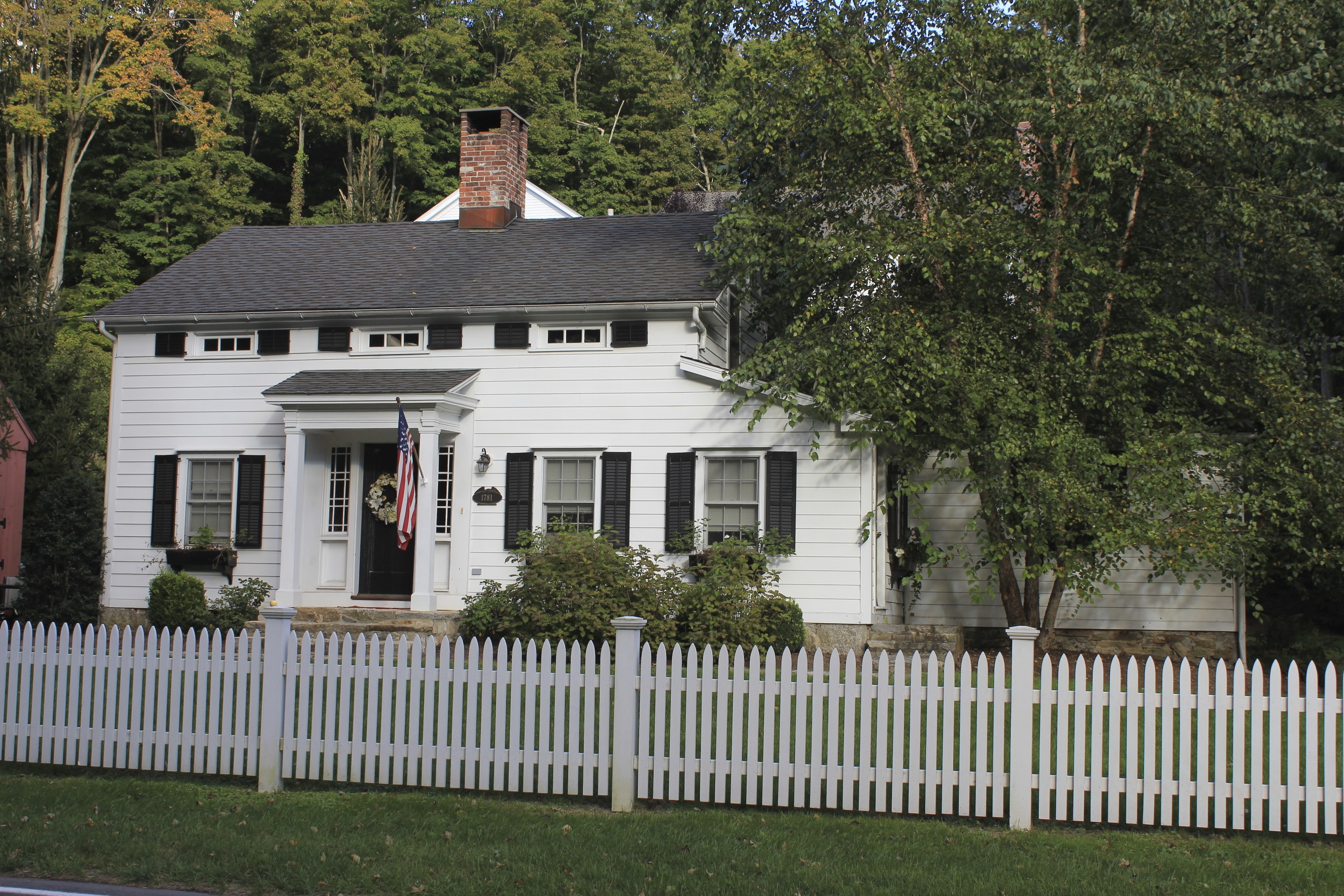
Curtis Wood House

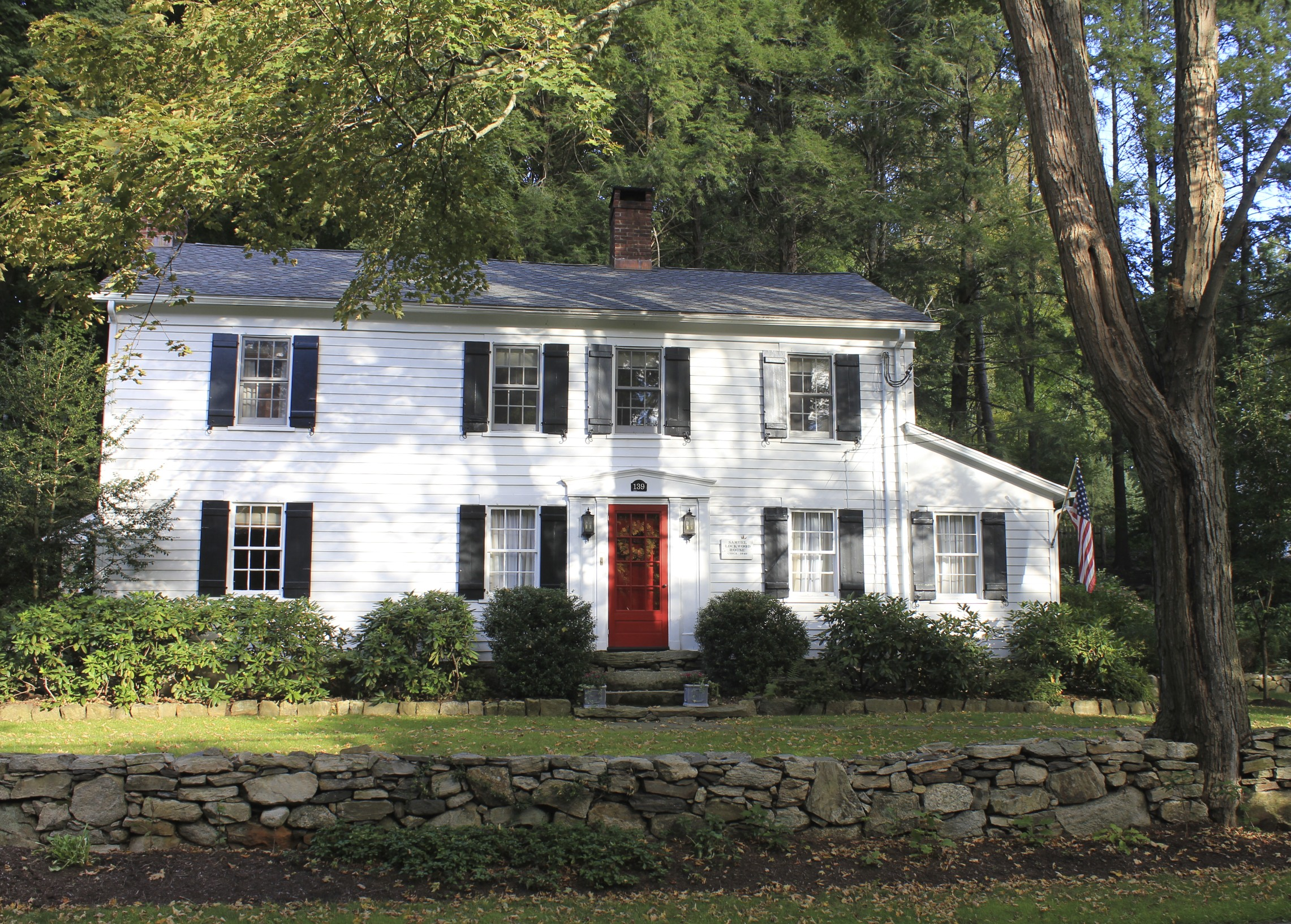
Samuel Lockwood House

== See also ==
- National Register of Historic Places listings in Fairfield County, Connecticut
