= George Weston (disambiguation) =

George Weston (1864–1924) was a Canadian businessman and the founder of George Weston Limited.

George Weston may also refer to:

== People ==
- George Weston (lawyer) (1876–1957), New Zealand lawyer and cricketer
- George Weston (physicist) (1925–2009), English physicist and author
- George G. Weston (born 1964), British businessman
- George W. Weston (1931–2006), American singer

== Other uses ==
- George Weston Limited, a Canadian food production and distribution company
- George Weston Foods, an Australian food company
