= Tom Weston (disambiguation) =

Tom Weston is a New Zealand Queen's Counsel and poet.

Tom Weston may also refer to:

- Tom Weston, a character in the British TV series The Guardians
- Tom Weston, a character in the 1916 American silent film The Love Hermit

== See also ==
- Thomas Weston (disambiguation)
