= Thomas Weston =

Thomas Weston may refer to:

- Thomas Weston, 4th Earl of Portland (1609–1688)
- Thomas Weston (actor) (1737–1776), British actor
- Thomas Weston (horticulturalist) (1866–1935), Australian horticulturalist
- Thomas Weston (merchant adventurer) (c. 1584–1647/48), English merchant and settler in America
- Thomas Weston (MP), member of parliament for Cricklade 1369–1388
- Thomas Crowley Weston (born 1958), Cook Islands justice
- Thomas S. Weston (1836–1912), New Zealand judge and politician
- Thomas Shailer Weston Jr. (1868–1931), member of the New Zealand Legislative Council
- Tommy Weston (1890–1952), English footballer
- Tommy Weston (jockey) (1902–1981), British jockey
- Thomas Weston (comics), fictional character from DC Comics

== See also ==
- Tom Weston (disambiguation)
