= Hugh Weston =

English churchman and academic

Hugh Weston (c. 1505 – 1558) was an English churchman and academic, Dean of Westminster and Dean of Windsor, and Rector of Lincoln College, Oxford.

== Life ==
He was born at Burton-Overy, Leicestershire, about 1505, and educated at Balliol College, Oxford, migrating to Lincoln College. He graduated B.A. on 18 July 1530, M.A. on 14 January 1533, B.M. on 30 May 1537, B.D. on 2 May 1539, and D.D. in July 1540, being incorporated D.D. at Cambridge in 1554. On 16 July 1533, he was elected as one of the officials of Oxford market, and in 1537 was proctor. On 8 January 1538, he was elected Rector of Lincoln College, and in 1540 was appointed Lady Margaret professor of divinity.

On 15 September 1541, he was collated rector of St. Nicholas Olave, and on 19 May 1544, rector of St. Botolph's, Bishopsgate. On 17 October 1547, he was appointed Archdeacon of Cornwall, and in the same year he became rector of Burton-Overy. Early in 1549, his Catholic views brought him into collision with the university visitors; he was ejected from his professorship, and on 11 September following Alexander Seymour was paid for arresting Weston in Leicestershire and conveying him to the Fleet prison.

How long he remained in confinement is uncertain, but he retained all his offices except his professorship, and received further preferment on Queen Mary's accession. On 18 September 1553 he was installed dean of Westminster, and on 22 January 1554 was collated to the archdeaconry of Colchester; he also received the living of Cliff-at-Hoo, Kent, on 2 April 1554, resigning the rectorship of Lincoln in 1555. His services as a controversialist were in great demand. He acted as confessor to Henry Grey, 1st Duke of Suffolk and Sir Thomas Wyatt at their execution, was prolocutor of the convocation that met on 16 October 1553, and preached at St. Paul's Cross four days later, and before the queen on Ash Wednesday (7 February 1553–4) during Wyatt's rebellion. He examined Thomas Philpot, had disputations with Nicholas Ridley and John Bradford, and presided over Thomas Cranmer's trial in St. Mary's, Oxford, on the 14th, and over the disputation between Latimer and Richard Smith on 18 April 1554.

In 1556, when it was decided to restore Westminster Abbey to its monastic character, Weston was induced to resign his deanery in favour of John de Feckenham, receiving instead the deanery of Windsor. In August 1557, he was deprived by Cardinal Pole of his deanery and the archdeaconry of Colchester for gross immorality, but retained, through Edmund Bonner's complaisance, his parochial preferments; his moral delinquencies (he was caught committing adultery) are detailed by various Protestant writers of the time, and especially in "Michael Wood"'s preface to the 1553 edition of Stephen Gardiner's 'De Vera Obedientia'. He determined to appeal against Pole's decision to the Roman curia, but was arrested at Gravesend when setting out, and lodged in the Tower of London. He was released on plea of sickness on 3 December 1558, and died at the house of one Winter in Fleet Street on 8 December, being buried in the Savoy. By his will, dated 26 November 1558, he provided for masses for his soul at Balliol and Lincoln Colleges, at St. Mary's, Oxford, at Burton-Overy, and at Islip, of which he is said to have been rector. His Oratio coram Patribus et Clero habita 16 October 1553 was published in that year (London), and disputations are printed in John Foxe's Actes and Monuments. Edward Weston was his great-nephew.
