= John Case (Aristotelian writer) =

John Case (or Johannes Casus) (died 1600) was an English writer on Aristotle.

== Life ==
Case was born between 1539 and 1546 at Woodstock, Oxfordshire, and was a chorister at New College and Christ Church, Oxford. He was elected to a scholarship at St. John's in 1564. He was B.A. in 1568, M.A. in 1572, and became a fellow of his college. He had a high reputation as a disputant. Being "popishly affected," says Anthony Wood, he "left his fellowship and married" in 1574. His wife was Elizabeth Dobson, the widow of John Dobson, the keeper of Bocardo prison. Case's stepdaughter Anne Dobson married Regius Professor of Medicine (Oxford) Bartholomew Warner.

Case obtained leave from the university to read logic and philosophy to young men, chiefly Roman Catholics, in his own house in Oxford; it became a largely attended philosophical school due to Case's reputation as a logician and dialectician. Among his pupils was Edward Weston. He wrote various handbooks for his students' use, which were published and for a time popular, though they had fallen into disrepute in Wood's day. He is described as "a man of an innocent, meek, religious and studious life," an agreeable conversationalist, an enthusiastic teacher, and a great favourite with his pupils. He was in addition an authority on music and a distinguished physician, becoming M.D. in 1589.

Case made money in the practice of medicine and left various sums to St. John's College, New College, and the poor of Woodstock. In 1589 he became Canon of Sarum. He died on 23 January 1599 – 1600 and was buried in the chapel of St. John's College. His portrait is in the Bodleian Library.

== Works ==
Title page of John Case's Sphaera Civitatis (1588)

Most of Case's works were commentaries on various treatises of Aristotle (Organon, Nicomachean Ethics, Politics, Economics, Physics) under curious titles; they enjoyed a large circulation during his time, and were frequently reprinted.

His works include Summa veterum interpretum in universam dialecticam Aristotelis (1584, on the Organon) and Speculum moralium quaestionum in universam ethicen Aristotelis (1585, a commentary on the Nicomachean Ethics; verses prefixed by Laurence Humphrey), which was the first book printed at the press presented to Oxford by their chancellor, Robert Dudley, 1st Earl of Leicester, and which had been reprinted eight times in Frankfurt by 1625.

Sphaera Civitatis (1588, a commentary on Aristotle's Politics), like other books by Case, was reprinted abroad, and Barnes, the printer, obtained an order from the university in 1590 that every bachelor should take one copy on "determining."

Case's later works were Reflexus Speculi Moralis (1596, a commentary on the Magna Moralia), Thesaurus Oeconomiae (1597, a commentary on the pseudo-Aristotelian Economics), Lapis philosophicus seu commentarius in VIII libros Physicorum Arisotelis in quo arcana physiologiae examinantur (1599, a commentary on Aristotle's Physics; despite the title it bears no relation to alchemy) and Ancilla Philosophiae (1599, an epitome of the Physics).

He also wrote an Apologia Musices, tam vocalis quam instrumentalis et mixtae (1588), of which there is a copy in the Lambeth Library. The Praise of Musicke; wherein...is described the sober and lawful use of the same in the Congregation and Church of God (1586) is also attributed to him. This is dedicated to Sir Walter Raleigh by the printer Barnes, who calls it "an orphan of one of Lady Musicke's children." A contemporary, Thomas Watson, wrote some verses, now in the Rawlinson manuscripts, to Case on the publication called "A Gratification unto Mr. John Case for his learned book lately made on the Praizes of Musick."

There are three letters from Case in British Library Harley MS 6995. He prefixed a letter to Nicholas Breton's Pilgrimage to Paradise.
