= Weston, Wisconsin (disambiguation) =

Weston, Wisconsin is a village in the United States.

Weston may also refer to the following places in Wisconsin:

- Weston, Clark County, Wisconsin, a town
- Weston, Dunn County, Wisconsin, a town
- Weston (community), Dunn County, Wisconsin, an unincorporated community
- Weston (town), Marathon County, Wisconsin, a town

== See also ==
- Weston (disambiguation)
