= Richard Weston =

Richard Weston may refer to:

== Politicians ==
- Richard de Weston, MP for Coventry 1295
- Sir Richard Weston (treasurer) (1465–1541), English Sub-Treasurer of the Exchequer, father of Francis Weston who was associated with Anne Boleyn
- Richard Weston (died 1572), MP for Lostwithiel, Saltash, Maldon and Lancaster between 1553 and 1555
- Richard Weston (MP for Petersfield) (1564–1613), MP for Petersfield, 1593
- Richard Weston, 1st Earl of Portland (1577–1635/5), English nobleman and political figure
- Sir Richard Weston (Royalist) (1579–1652), English judge and politician
- Richard Weston (MP for Stafford) (1608/9-1652), Royalist soldier and politician, MP for Stafford (UK Parliament constituency) in 1640
- Richard Weston (died 1681) (1620–1681), English MP

== Others ==
- Sir Richard Weston (canal builder) (1591–1652), English canal builder and agriculturalist
- Richard Weston (botanist) (1733–1806), English botanist
- Richard Weston (architect) (born 1953), architect, writer and professor
