= Edward Weston (disambiguation) =

Edward Weston (1886–1958) was an American photographer and co-founder of Group f/64.

Edward Weston may also refer to:

- Edward Weston (priest) (1566–1635), English Roman Catholic controversialist
- Edward Weston (politician) (1703–1770), English didactic writer and politician
- Edward Weston (chemist) (1850–1936), English chemist who migrated to Newark, New Jersey and developed electroplating
- Edward Faraday Weston (1878–1971), his son, designer of the Weston exposure meter which established the Weston film speed ratings
- Edward Payson Weston (1839–1929), pedestrian
- Edward Weston (pastoralist), officer of the East India Company who arrived in Australia in 1825
- Edward Burbank Weston (1846–1918), American archer and medical doctor
- Professor Weston (Edward Rolles Weston), a character created by C. S. Lewis
