= Matthew Kellison =

English Roman Catholic priest

Matthew Kellison (c. 1560 – 21 January 1642) was an English Roman Catholic theologian and controversialist, and a reforming president of the English College, Douai.

== Life ==
Born about 1560 at Harrowden, Northamptonshire, he was son of a servant and tenant of William Vaux, 3rd Baron Vaux of Harrowden. In 1581 he entered the English College of Douai, then temporarily at Rheims, and in September 1582 he was sent with six of his fellow-students to the English College at Rome. In August 1587 he received orders, probably those of sub-deacon, and in September 1589, the year of his advancement to the priesthood, was sent back to Rheims to succeed William Giffard as professor of scholastic theology. He moved to Douai with the other professors and students of the college in 1593, and matriculated in the university there on 1 April 1594. Afterwards he returned to Rheims, and having taken the degree of D.D., he was appointed in 1601 regius professor, and on 30 January 1606 magnificus rector or chancellor of the university. When Arras College was founded at Paris in 1611 to associate scholars for the purpose of writing controversial works, Kellison was one of the five first admitted. He frequently visited the college.

During the disputes at Douai College, in consequence of the subservience of the president, Thomas Worthington, to the Jesuits, the cardinal-protector summoned Worthington to Rome, and appointed Kellison as provisional head. Kellison arrived at Douai on 10 June 1613, and in November he was installed as the fourth president of the college. He resigned his preferments at Rheims, despite the inducement to remain held out by the Duke of Guise.

At Douai he appointed professors, obtained the discharge of the Jesuit confessor, and withdrew the scholars from Jesuit schools to be taught in the College. Within a few years he had expelled Edward Weston and Thomas Singleton, leading supporters of the Jesuits within Douai. His reforms made him enemies, but the nuncios at Brussels and Paris supported him. The English secular clergy three times without result recommended him to be their bishop, in 1608, 1614, and 1622. After presiding over Douai College for 27 years he died there, on 21 January 1642.

== Works ==
His works include:

- A Survey of the New Religion. Detecting manie grosse absurdities which it implieth, Douai, 1603, with dedication to James I; 'newly augmented,' Douai, 1605. Matthew Sutcliffe, dean of Exeter, published two replies in 1606.
- Kellison's Reply to Sutcliffe's Answer ..., in which most points of the Catholike doctrine is explicated, and al is averred and confirmed; and almost al pointes of the New Faith of England disproved, Rheims, 1608.
- Examen Reformationis novae praesertim Calvinianae, in quo Synagoga et Doctrina Calvini, sicut et reliquorum hujus temporis novatorum, tota fece ex suis principiis refutatur, Douai, 1616. This work and Kellison's Reply to Sutcliffe were attacked by Francis Mason, archdeacon of Norfolk, in his 'Vindication of the Church of England,' London, 1613. fol., translated into Latin in 1625.
- The Right and Jurisdiction of the Prelate and the Prince, a Treatise of Ecclesiasticall and Regall Authoritie. Compyled by J. E., Student in Divinitie, for the ful Instruction and Appeacement of the Consciences of English Catholikes, concerning the late Oath of Pretended Allegiance, Douai, 1617 and 1621. Here, in a work of political thought, he argued against Thomas Preston, and for the deposing power of the papacy. This was an exposition in plain English of scholastic ideas, where he followed in particular Gabriel Vásquez.
- The Gagge of the Reformed Gospell. Briefly discovering the errors of our time, with the refutation by expresse textes of their owne approved English Bible, Douai, 1623; republished, under the title of The Touchstone of the Reformed Gospel, 1675; re-edited by Bishop Challoner under the title of The Touchstone of the New Religion, 1734, and frequently reprinted. Long attributed to Kellison, this is now considered to be by the printer John Heigham. A reply by Richard Montagu was called A Gagg for the New Gospel?, 1624.
- A Treatise of the Hierarchie and divers Orders of the Church against the Anarchie of Calvin, Douai, 1629. This work, which gave offence to the regular clergy, was attacked by the Jesuits John Floyd and Edward Knott, and gave rise to a protracted controversy. It was written to support Richard Smith, and adopted some Gallican ideas.
- A brief and necessary Instruction for the Catholicks of England, touching their Pastor, 1631, answered by Floyd.
