= Thomas Weston, 4th Earl of Portland =

English nobleman (1608–1669)

Thomas Weston, 4th Earl of Portland (9 October 1609 – May 1688) was a younger son of the 1st Earl of Portland, by his second wife Frances Walgrave. He was born at Nayland in Suffolk, England.

His elder brother Jerome succeeded their father in 1635, and passed the title to his own son, Charles, in 1662. However, the 3rd Earl did not marry and produce a direct heir of his own prior to his death in 1665, so Thomas succeeded as Earl of Portland.

Lord Portland married Anne Boteler, daughter of the 1st Baron Boteler and widow of the 1st Earl of Newport, but they had no children. When he died, his estates passed to his nieces, the daughters of the 2nd Earl, but his title became extinct.

Peerage of England
Preceded by Charles Weston	Earl of Portland; 1665–1688	Extinct
