= Thomas Preston (monk) =

English Benedictine monk (1563–1640)

Thomas Preston (1563 – 3 April 1640?) was an English Benedictine monk serving as one of the leaders of the mission to re-establish the Benedictine Order in England after the closure of monasteries during the 16th century. He is also remembered for his writings upholding the cause of James I of England in the allegiance oath controversy.

== Life ==
Born in Shropshire, Preston studied in the English College, Rome, where he was taught by Gabriel Vasquez. He joined the Benedictine Order at Monte Cassino in 1590. Following the decree granted by the Inquisition and confirmed by Clement VIII in 1602 for a mission to the Benedictines in England, Preston and Anselm Beech were sent to England in the spring of 1603. They landed at Great Yarmouth and made contact with Sigebert Buckley, last survivor of the monks of Westminster Abbey, who had recently been released from imprisonment in Framlingham. They lived with Buckley, who by letters of 1607 and 1609 granted and confirmed to them authority to admit brethren to membership of the monastery and Congregation of which he had been the only surviving representative. To Preston, already the superior of the English of the Congregation of Monte Cassino, he entrusted the care of the English Congregation. Buckley died in 1610. Meanwhile, Preston had been indicted as a priest, and was soon afterwards imprisoned.

Expelled from England three years later, he took part at Rheims in the negotiations for the union of the English monks of Monte Cassino, Valladolid, and the old English Congregation. He returned to England and was again imprisoned, first in The Clink in Southwark, and later in Croydon Palace of the Archbishop of Canterbury.

Preston passed much of the rest of his life in prison. He died in The Clink prison, 5 April 1640. In one prison or another he wrote, under the assumed name of Widdrington, several works treating of the oath of allegiance. Preston "evermore disowned" the books written under the name of Widdrington, but there is no doubt that he was the author of them. Towards the end of his life, however, he seems to have altered his views, or at any rate to have made full submission on the question of the oath to the authorities of Rome.

== Works ==
Preston took the pen name of Roger Widdrington for his controversial writings, concealing his own authorship, and using the real name of a Roman Catholic squire in Northumberland, a Bailiff of Hexham who was associated with the recusant Radcliffe family and the conspirator Thomas Percy. These publications upheld the oath of allegiance to King James I which the King himself was proposing (Preston being one of the group of Benedictines and secular priests who were apologists for it), against the opposing policy of the Jesuits. The 1611 Apologia was given a false imprimatur although in fact being published in London by government order: it is possible that the real Widdrington was complicit in the use of his name, though it was quickly recognised that he was unlikely to be the true author.

Among his works are:

- Apologia Cardinalis Bellarmini pro Jure Principum. Adversus suas ipsius Rationes pro Auctoritate papali Principes sæculares in Ordine ad bonum spirituale deponendi, Cosmopoli [Lond.], 1611.
- R. W. ... Responsio apologetica ad Libellum cujusdam Doctoris Theologi, qui ejus Pro Jure Principum Apologiam, tanquam Fidei Catholicæ ... repugnantem ... criminatur, Cosmopoli [Lond. 1612]. This was attacked in 1617 by Matthew Kellison. Preston replied in 1620.
- Disputatio theologica de Juramento Fidelitatis ... Paulo Papæ quinto dedicata. In qua potissima omnia Argumenta, quæ a ... Bellarmino, J. Gretzero, L. Lessio, M. Becano, aliisque nonnullis contra recens Fidelitatis Juramentum ... facta sunt, ... examinantur. (R. W. ... Apologeticæ Responsionis ad Libellum cujusdam Doctoris Theologi Præfatio), 2 pts., Albionopoli [Lond.], 1613.
- Purgatio, 1614. At the demand of the Cardinals de Propaganda Fide.
- A cleare ... confutation of the ... Reply of T. F., who is knowne to be Mr. Thomas Fitzherbert, an English jesuite. Wherein also are confuted the chiefest objections which Dr. Schulckenius, who is commonly said to be Card. Bellarmine, hath made against Widdrington's Apologie for the Right, or Soveraigntie of temporall princes. By R. W., an English Catholike, 1616.
- Appendix ad Disputationem theologicam de Juramento Fidelitatis, in quo omnia Argumenta, quæ à F. Suarez ... pro Potestate Papali Principes deponendi, et contra recens Fidelitatis Juramentum allata sunt ... examinantur, Albionopoli [Lond.], 1616.
- R. Widdrington ... ad ... Paulum Quintum Pontificem hæc ... Supplicatio cui adjungitur Appendix, in quo plurimæ Calumniæ ... quas A. Schulckenius Widdringtono ... imposuit, ... deteguntur, 2 pt., Albionopoli [Lond.], 1616.
- The tryal and execution of Father H. Garnet ... for the Powder-Treason. Collected by R. W. ... Printed in Latin in 1616 ... and thence translated. Now published to make it further evident that it is no new thing for Jesuits to curse and ban to justifie a lie Lond. 1679.
- Discussio Discussionis Decreti Magni Concilii Lateranensis, adversus L. Lessium nomine Guilhelmi Singletoni personatum, in quâ omnia Argumenta, quæ idemmet Lessius pro Papali Potestate Principes deponendi adducit, ... examinantur & refutantur et quædam egregia ... Cardinalis Peronii Artificia ... deteguntur & refutantur, Augustæ [Lond.], 1618.
- R. Widdringtons last reioynder to Mr. T. Fitz-Herberts Reply concerning the Oath of Allegiance and the Popes power to depose princes ... Also many replies ... of ... Bellarmine in his Schulckenius, and of L. Lessius in his Singleton are confuted, and divers cunning shifts of ... Peron are discovered, 1619, 4to, and [Lond.?], 1633.
- A New Yeares Gift for English Catholikes, or a brief and cleare Explication of the New Oath of Allegiance. By E. I., Student in Divinitie [Lond.], 1620. Also published in Latin the same year, under the title of Strena Catholica.
- An Adjoinder to the late Catholick New Year's Gift, 1620.

Schulckenius was Adolf Schulcken, a Dutch theologian and supporter of Robert Bellarmine, thought at the time by many opponents to be pseudonymous.

== See also ==
- R.H. Connolly and J. McCann, Memorials of Father Augustine Baker and other Memorials of the English Benedictines, Catholic Record Society Vol 33 (London 1933).
- E. L. Taunton, 'Thomas Preston and Roger Widdrington', English Historical Review XVIII (1903), pp. 116–19.
- S. Tutino, 'Thomas Preston and English Catholic Loyalism: Elements of an International Affair', The Sixteenth Century Journal, The Journal of Early Modern Studies 41 (for 2010) Part 1 (Spring), pp. 91–109.
- W. K. L. Webb, ‘Thomas Preston, O.S.B., alias Roger Widdrington (1567–1640)’, Biographical Studies 2 (1953–54), pp. 216–68.
