= Weston (CDP), Connecticut =

Census-designated place in Connecticut, United States

Weston, Connecticut
- Census-designated place
- Location within Connecticut Location within the United States
- Coordinates: 41°12′2″N 73°22′50″W
- Country: United States
- State: Connecticut
- County: Fairfield
- Town: Weston

Area
  - Total: 1.50 sq mi (3.88 km^{2})
  - Land: 1.50 sq mi (3.88 km^{2})
  - Water: 0 sq mi (0.0 km^{2})
- Elevation: 311 ft (95 m)
- Time zone: UTC-5 (Eastern (EST))
  - Summer (DST): UTC-4 (EDT)
- ZIP Code: 06883
- Area codes: 203/475
- FIPS code: 09-83360
- GNIS feature ID: 2805975

Weston is a census-designated place (CDP) in the town of Weston, Fairfield County, Connecticut, United States. It comprises the center of town government and surrounding residential areas. The area was known as "Norfield" from 1795 to 1920, and the Norfield Historic District, which occupies the center of the CDP, around the intersection of Norfield Road and Weston Road, preserves the older name.

The CDP is in the southwestern part of the town of Weston. Connecticut Routes 53 and 57 pass through the community. Route 57 leads south 4.6 miles (7.4 km) to the center of Westport and north 5.2 miles (8.4 km) to Georgetown, while Route 53 leads northeast 7 miles (11 km) to Redding and southwest the same distance to the center of Norwalk.

Weston was first listed as a CDP prior to the 2020 census.
