= Charles Weston, 3rd Earl of Portland =

- Predecessor: Jerome Weston, 2nd Earl of Portland
- Successor: Thomas Weston, 4th Earl of Portland
- Born: 19 May 1639
- Died: 3 June 1665 (aged 26)

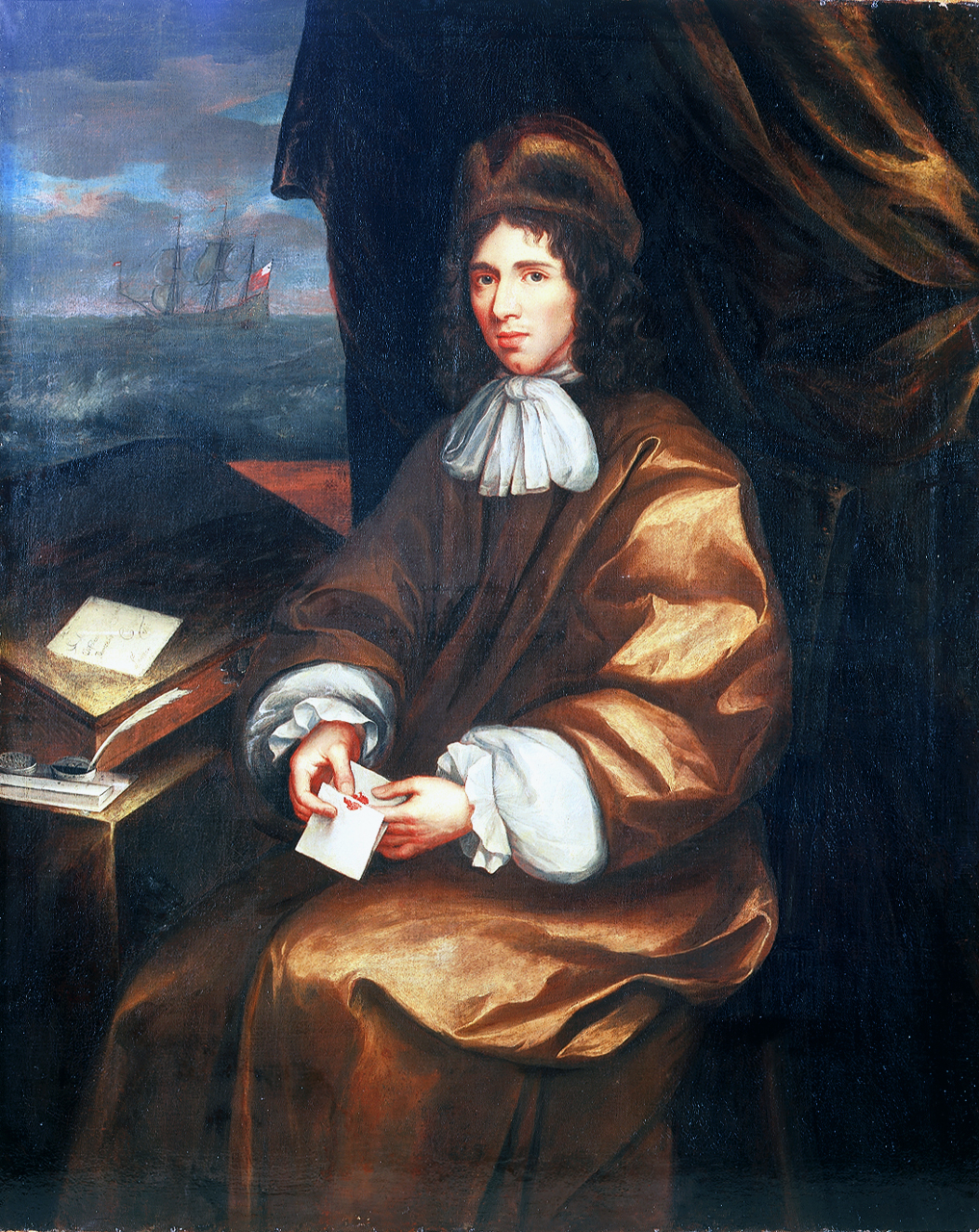
Charles Weston (1639–1665), 3rd Earl of Portland (1664 or 1665)

Charles Weston, 3rd Earl of Portland (19 May 1639 – 3 June 1665), was the only son and heir of the 2nd Earl of Portland and Lady Frances Stuart.

The only son of Jerome Weston, 2nd Earl of Portland, Weston was christened at St Margaret's, Westminster, on 19 May 1639. He succeeded his father as Earl of Portland in 1663. In May 1665, he went as a volunteer with the Duke of York, when he took command of the English fleet to fight the Dutch. Weston was at sea on the Royal James, when he was killed by a cannon shot in the Battle of Lowestoft, having made a will a few days before on 29 May 1665. Since he never married, his title and entailed property was passed to his uncle, Thomas Weston.

Peerage of England
Preceded by Jerome Weston	Earl of Portland; 1663–1665	Succeeded by Thomas Weston
