= William Weston =

William or Bill Weston may refer to:

== Politicians ==
- William Weston I (c.1351–c.1419), MP for Surrey 1380–1419
- William Weston II, MP for Sussex in 1415
- William Weston III, MP for Guildford 1415, 1419, 1423 and 1431, and for Surrey 1447
- William Weston (c. 1546–1594), MP for Weymouth and Melcombe Regis in 1593
- William Weston (Australian politician) (1804–1888), third Premier of Tasmania
- William Weston (Vermont politician) (1803-1875), member of the Vermont Senate
- William Weston (MP for City of London) (died c.1427)

== Others ==
- Billy Weston (1847–1935), billiards player
- William Weston (engineer) (1763–1833), canal engineer
- William Weston (explorer) (circa 1445 – 1504/5), English merchant and explorer
- William Weston (footballer) (1882–1948), English soccer player
- William Weston (Jesuit) (c. 1550–1615), English Jesuit
- Sir William Weston (prior) (died 1540), English prior of the knights of St. John
- William Basil Weston (1924–1945), British Army officer, awarded the Victoria Cross
- William C. Weston (1886–1932), New Zealand-born American architect
- William H. Weston Jr. (1890–1978), American mycologist
- Bill Weston (rugby union), English international rugby union player
- Bill Weston (stuntman) (1941–2012), English actor and stuntman
- William Weston, character in Ecotopia

== See also ==
- William Weston Patton (1821–1889), American abolitionist
- William Weston Young (1776–1847), American Quaker entrepreneur
