= Norfield Historic District =

Historic district in Connecticut, United States

- U.S. National Register of Historic Places
- U.S. Historic district
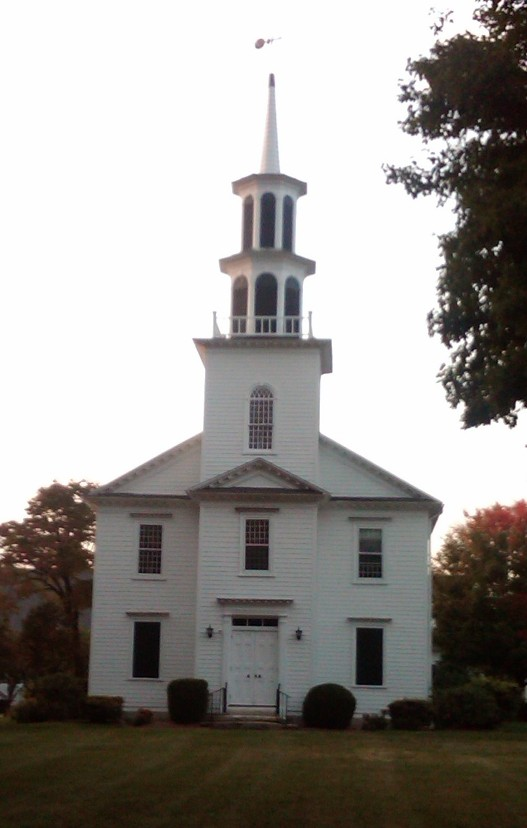
- Norfield Congregational Church

- Location within Connecticut Location within the United States
- Location: Roughly, Junction of Weston and Norfield Roads Northeast to Hedgerow Common, Weston, Connecticut
- Coordinates: 41°12′4″N 73°22′44″W
- Area: 18 acres (7.3 ha)
- Architectural style: Colonial Revival, Greek Revival, Federal
- NRHP reference No.: 91000955
- Added to NRHP: July 31, 1991

The Norfield Historic District is a 18-acre (7.3 ha) historic district in Weston, Connecticut, United States, that was listed on the National Register of Historic Places in 1991. It includes the present-day town center of Weston, which was known as "Norfield" from 1795 to 1920.

It was listed for its meeting architectural criteria, and included 16 contributing buildings. The district includes a total of 25 institutional and residential buildings, of which nine are more modern and non-contributing including the town hall and town library. The Norfield Congregational Church is the most prominent building.

== Norfield Congregational Church ==
Built in 1831, the church is located at 64 Norfield Road and still holds Sunday services. The church property includes the Christian Education Building, a parish hall, a parking area, a memorial garden and a front lawn including the Weston World War II memorial.

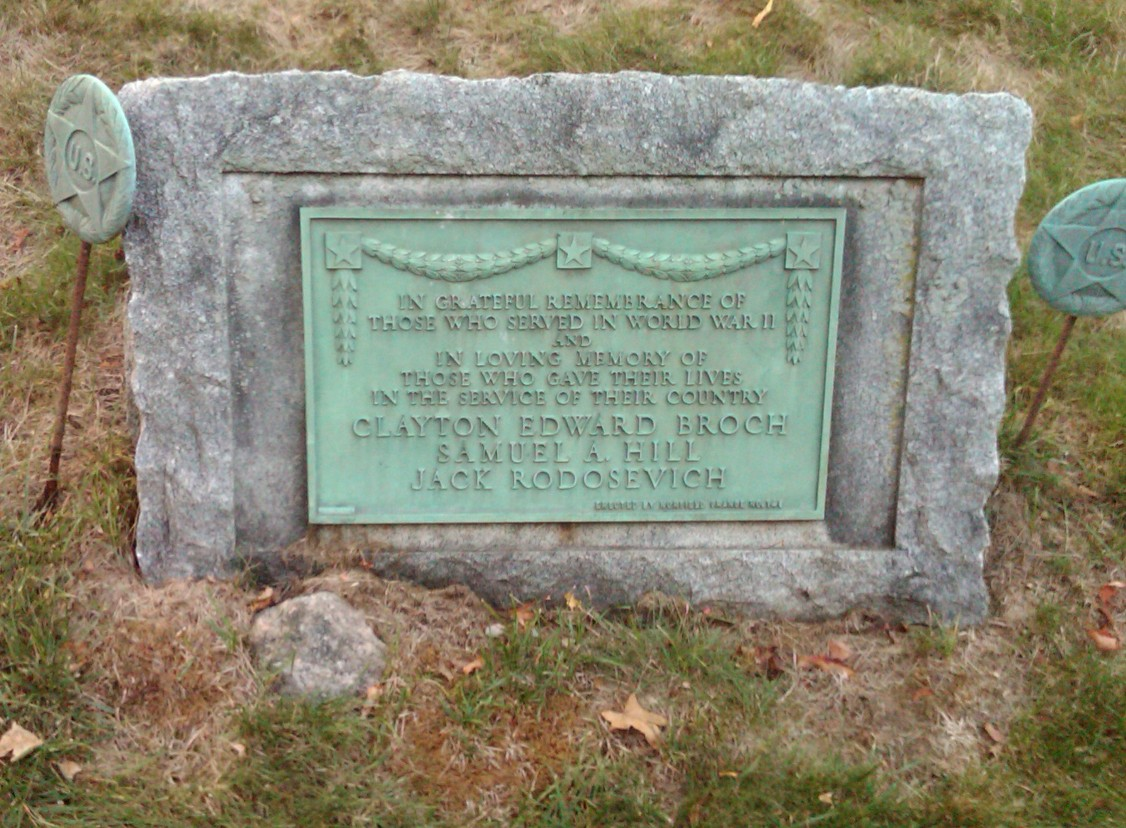
World War II memorial in front of the Norfield Congregational Church.

== See also ==
- National Register of Historic Places listings in Fairfield County, Connecticut
