= Richard Weston, 1st Earl of Portland =

English noble and Chancellor of the Exchequer under King Charles I

The Right Honourable The Earl of Portland KG PC
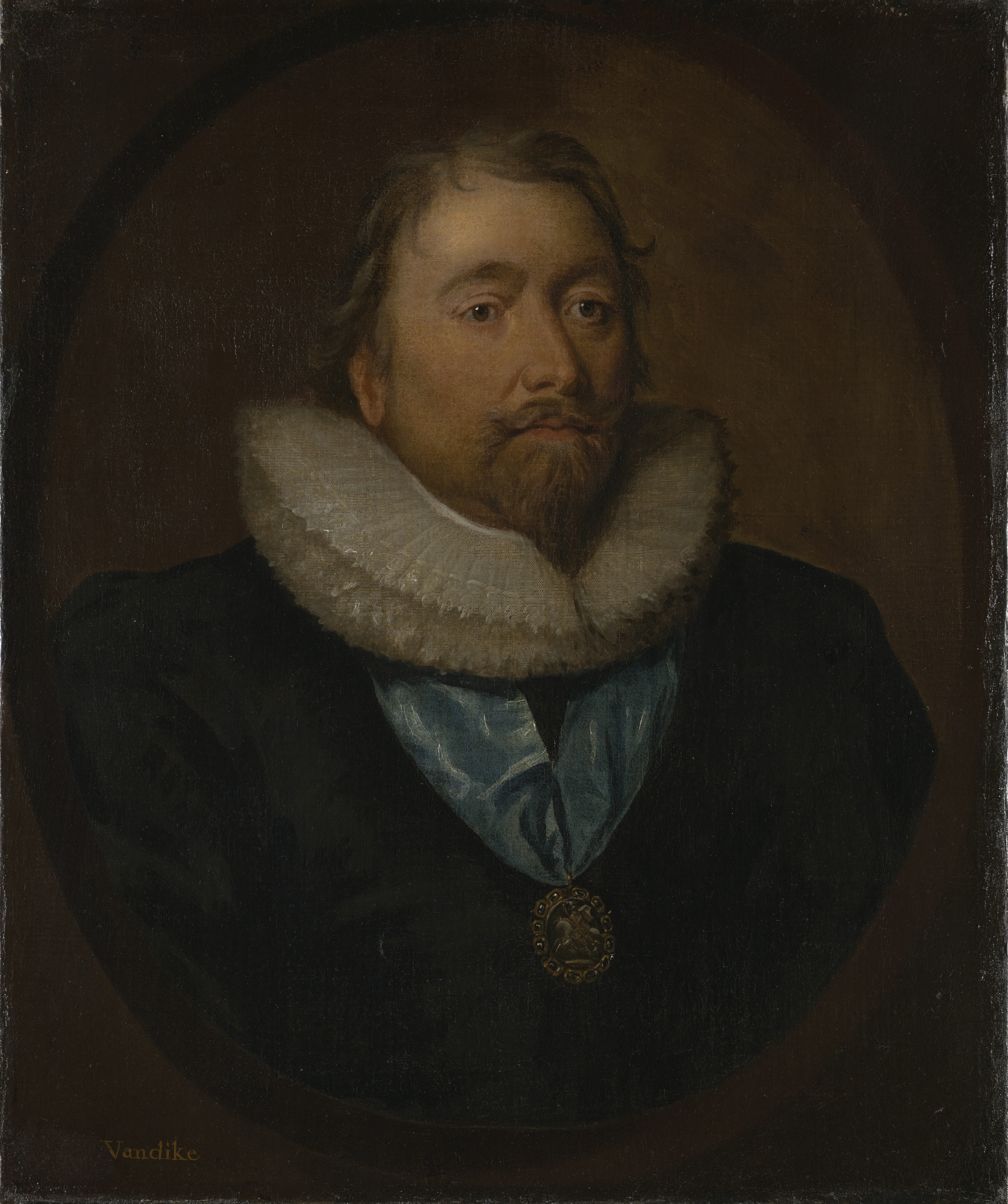

Lord High Treasurer
- In office 1628–1635
- Preceded by: James Ley, 1st Earl of Marlborough
- Succeeded by: William Juxon

Chancellor of the Exchequer
- In office 1621–1628
- Monarchs: James I Charles I
- Preceded by: The Lord Brooke
- Succeeded by: The Lord Barrett of Newburgh

First Lord of the Admiralty
- In office 1628–1635
- Monarch: Charles I
- Preceded by: Office established
- Succeeded by: Robert Bertie, 1st Earl of Lindsey

Personal details
- Born: 1 March 1577 Roxwell, Essex, England
- Died: 13 March 1634/1635 (aged 56-58)
- Children: 10, including Thomas and Jerome

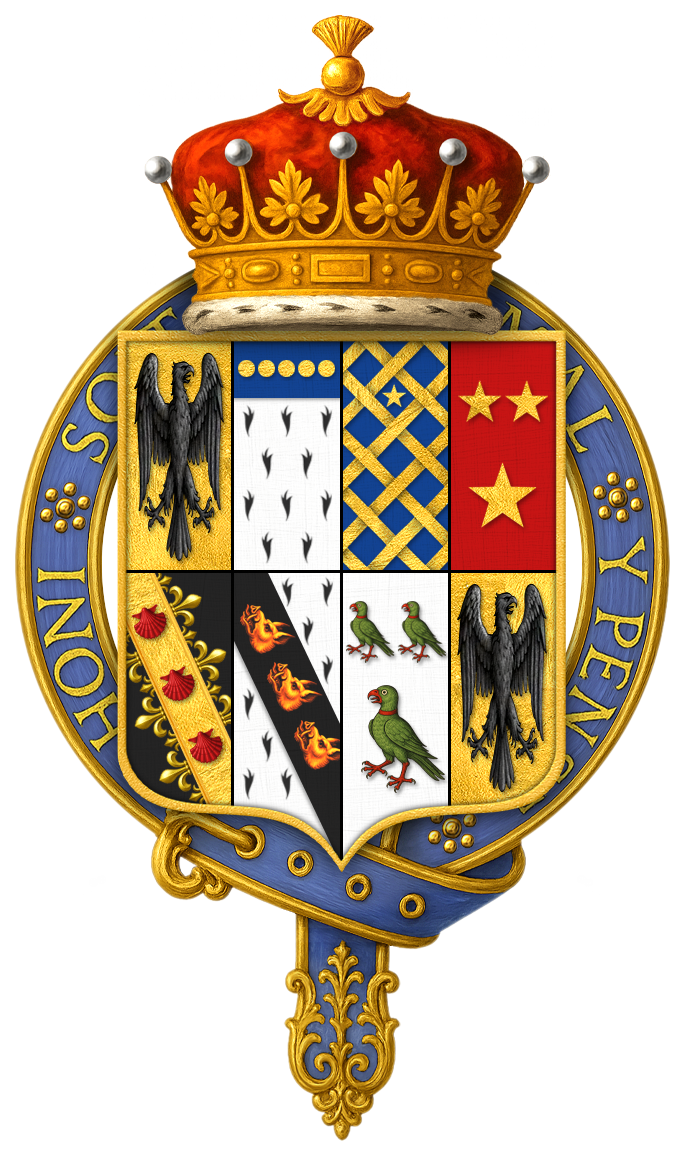
Quartered arms of Sir Richard Weston, 1st Earl of Portland, KG

Richard Weston, 1st Earl of Portland, KG (1 March 1577 – 13 March 1634/1635), was Chancellor of the Exchequer and later Lord Treasurer of England under James I and Charles I, being one of the most influential figures in the early years of Charles I's Personal Rule and the architect of many of the policies that enabled him to rule without raising taxes through Parliament.

== Biography ==
Weston was the eldest son and heir of Sir Jerome Weston, High Sheriff of Essex for 1599, and the former Mary Cave. He was born at Roxwell, Essex, and was a student of the Middle Temple. He served as Member of Parliament (MP) for a number of constituencies including Maldon (1601–1603), Midhurst (in the parliament of 1604–1611), Essex (in the Addled Parliament of 1614), Arundel (1622), Bossiney (1624), Callington (1625) and Bodmin (1626). He was knighted in 1603.

During the reign of King James I of England, Weston was sent on embassies to Bohemia, Brussels, and Spain. On the last assignment, he negotiated for the restitution of the Palatine. Upon his return to England in 1621, he was made Chancellor of the Exchequer, and retained the post after the accession of Charles I; he proved a capable financial manager but incurred popular hatred as a (justly) suspected Roman Catholic, while also later earning the enmity of the (Catholic) queen, Henrietta Maria for refusing grants to her favourites. He opposed wars with Spain in 1623 and France in 1626, but managed to find ways of raising the money to fund them when required, even when it was impossible to secure the cooperation of Parliament.

Weston was elevated to the peerage on 13 April 1628 as Baron Weston of Nayland in Suffolk. He was subsequently made Lord Treasurer of England and invested with the Order of the Garter. His policies proving highly unpopular, he escaped impeachment in 1629 only by the dissolution of Parliament. Nevertheless, he played an important role in the King's Personal Rule without Parliament, finding new sources of revenue while preventing any further increase in the King's expenditure, and being for a time the most influential of Charles's advisers. He persuaded the King to make peace with France in 1629 and Spain in 1630, removing the biggest drain on the treasury, and to sign the secret treaty with Spain in 1634. By the time he died in 1635, the Crown was solvent.

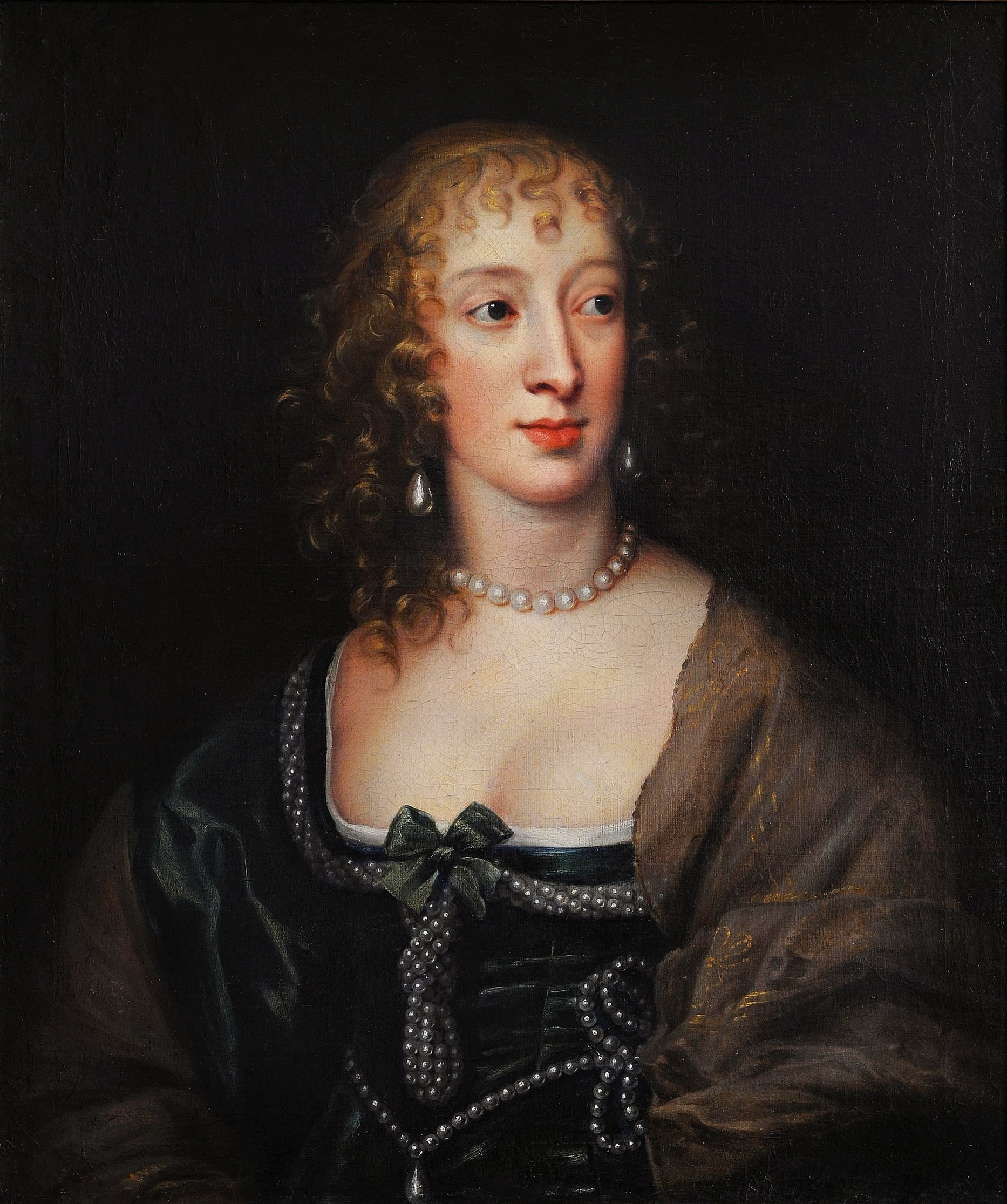
Frances Waldegrave, Countess of Portsmouth by Anthony van Dyck

On 17 February 1633, Weston was created Earl of Portland. Lord Portland was married twice. His first wife was Elizabeth Pincheon of Writtle in Essex. His second wife was Frances Waldegrave of Borley in Essex. He had three children by his first marriage, including Lady Mary Weston (2 January 1603-after August 1678), who married the 2nd Lord Aston of Forfar in 1629, and Lady Elizabeth Weston (died 1656), who married John Netterville, 2nd Viscount Netterville. He had seven children by his second marriage, including his son Thomas, who later succeeded as 4th Earl, and Lady Anne Weston, the first of the four wives of Basil Feilding, 2nd Earl of Denbigh. His nephew (his sister's son), Jeremy Clarke, became a Governor of Rhode Island in the American colonies.

On his death, he was succeeded by his second but eldest surviving son, Jerome.

== Sources ==
- Lee, Sidney, ed. (1899). "Weston, Richard (1577-1635)" . Dictionary of National Biography. Vol. 60. London: Smith, Elder & Co.

Political offices
Preceded by The Lord Brooke	Chancellor of the Exchequer; 1621–1628	Succeeded by The Lord Barrett of Newburgh
Preceded by The Earl of Marlborough	Lord Treasurer; 1628–1635	Succeeded by In Commission
Preceded by The Earl of Sussex; The Earl of Warwick	Lord Lieutenant of Essex jointly with The Earl of Warwick; 1629–1635	Succeeded by The Lord Maynard; The Earl of Warwick
Preceded by The Viscount Conway	Lord Lieutenant of Hampshire; 1631–1635	Succeeded by The Duke of Lennox; The Earl of Portland
Peerage of England
New title	Earl of Portland; 1633–1635	Succeeded by Jerome Weston
New title	Baron Weston; 1628–1635	Succeeded by Jerome Weston
