= Edward Weston (priest) =

Edward Weston (1566–1635) was an English Roman Catholic priest and controversialist.

== Life ==
The son of William Weston, of Lincoln College, Oxford and afterwards a member of Lincoln's Inn, by his wife, daughter of John Story, he was born in London in 1566. Hugh Weston was his great-uncle. Edward matriculated at Lincoln College on 20 March 1579. Afterwards he was put under the tuition of John Case.

After he had spent at least five years at Oxford, his parents, who were Catholics, took him from the university and sent him to France, where for a short time he settled in the English College at Reims. He was sent on 8 March 1585 to the English College, Rome, where he spent six years in studying philosophy and theology, and was ordained priest. He was created D.D. by the university of Monreale. Then he returned to Reims, where, on 3 November 1592, he began a course of lectures on cases of conscience. In 1593 the college moved to Douai, where Weston lectured in divinity for about ten years. Later he went on mission in England, returning to Douai on 23 September 1612.

He maintained a correspondence with Cardinal Robert Bellarmine, who held similar political views. He was dismissed from Douai in 1617 by Matthew Kellison. Later he was made canon of the collegiate church of St. Mary, Bruges, where, according to Hippolyte-Romain-Joseph Duthillœul, he died in 1635.

== Works ==
His works are:

- ‘De triplici Hominis Officio, ex notione ipsius Naturali, Morali, ac Theologica; Institutiones orthodoxæ, contra Atheos, Politicos, Sectarios,’ Antwerp, 1602.
- ‘Juris Pontificii Sanctuarium. Defensum ac propugnatum contra Rogerii Widdringtoni in Apologia & Responso Apologetico Impietatem’ [Douai], 1613. Against Thomas Preston writing as Roger Widdrington.
- ‘The Triall of Christian Truth by the Rules of the Vertues, namely these principall, Faith, Hope, Charitie, and Religion; serving for the discoverie of Heresie, and Antichrist in his Forerunners and Misteries of Iniquitie,’ Douay, 1614–15, 3 vols.
- ‘Probatio, seu Examen Veritatis Christianæ,’ Douay, 1614.
- ‘The Repaire of Honour, falsely impeached by Featlye, a minister; wherein (by occasion) the Apostles disciple S. Ignatius his religion, against Protestantisme, is layd open,’ Bruges, 1624.
- ‘Theatrum Vitæ civilis ac sacræ: sive de Moribus Reipub. Christianæ Commentaria,’ in 5 books, Bruges, 1626.
- ‘Jesu Christi Domini nostri Coruscationum, simulque earum vi dictorum, factorumque quarumdam Personarum, eodem Christo præsente, in Evangelica Historia recensitorum, Enarrationes philosophicæ, theologicæ, historicæ,’ Antwerp, 1631.

== Notes ==
Attribution

This article incorporates text from a publication now in the public domain: "Weston, Edward (1566-1635)". Dictionary of National Biography. London: Smith, Elder & Co. 1885–1900.
