= Weston, Connecticut =

Town in Connecticut, United States

- Town
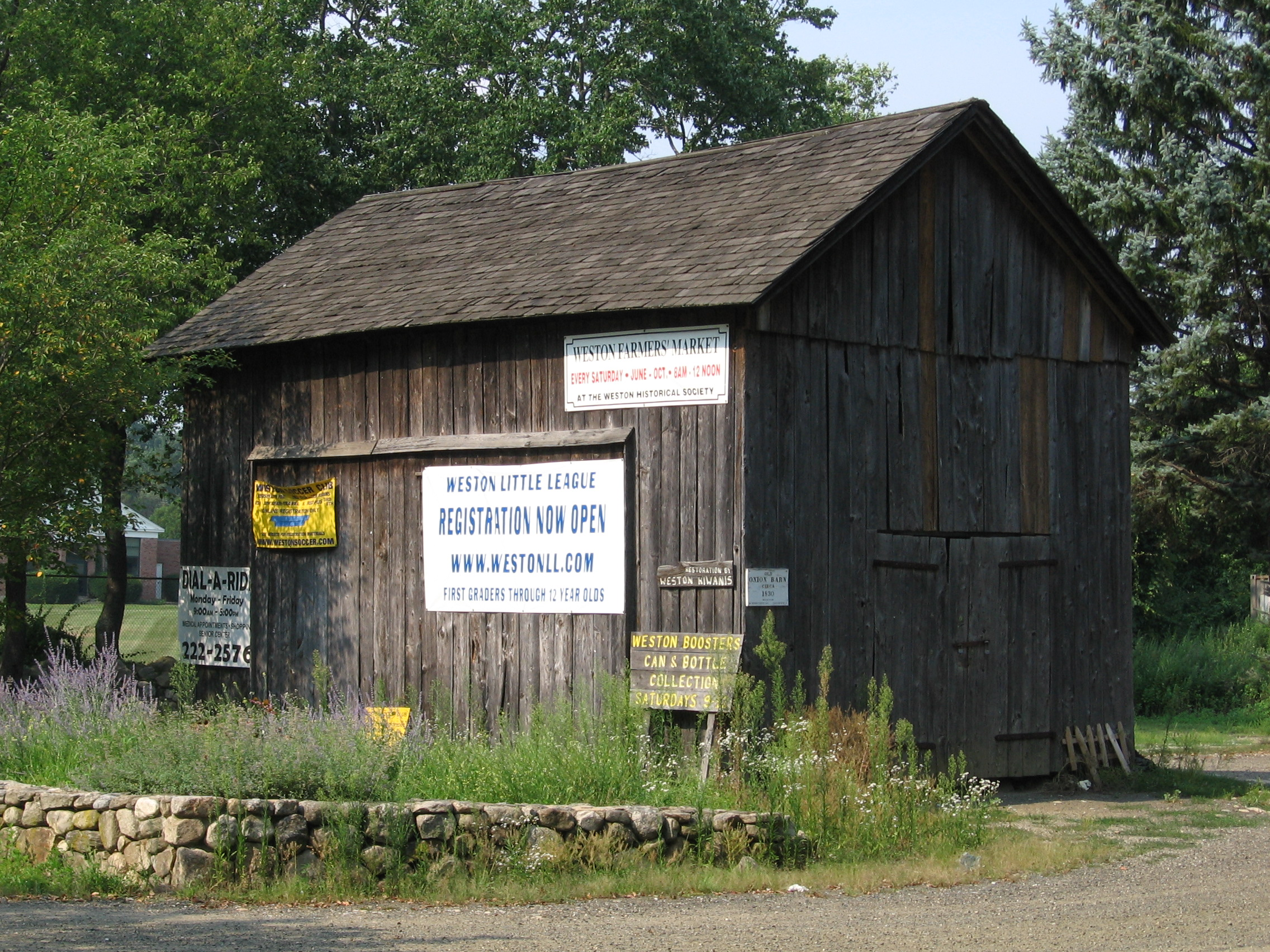
- The Onion Barn, where community bulletins are posted

- Seal Logo

- Coordinates: 41°13′32″N 73°22′14″W
- Country: United States
- U.S. state: Connecticut
- County: Fairfield
- Region: Western CT
- Incorporated: 1787

Government
  - Type: Selectman-town meeting
  - First selectman: Samantha Nestor (D)
  - Selectman: Kerem Dinlec (R)
  - Selectman: Anthony Pesco (D)
  - Town administrator: Karl Kilduff

Area
  - Total: 20.7 sq mi (53.6 km^{2})
  - Land: 19.8 sq mi (51.3 km^{2})
  - Water: 0.93 sq mi (2.4 km^{2})
- Elevation: 315 ft (96 m)

Population (2020)
  - Total: 10,354
  - Density: 491.7/sq mi (189.8/km^{2})
- Time zone: UTC-5 (Eastern Standard Time)
  - Summer (DST): UTC-4 (Eastern Daylight Time)
- ZIP codes: 06883, 06829
- Area codes: 203/475
- FIPS code: 09-83430
- GNIS feature ID: 213531
- Website: www.westonct.gov

Weston (/ˈwɛstən/ WEST-ən) is a town in Fairfield County, Connecticut, United States. The population was 10,354 at the 2020 census and had the highest median income in the state of Connecticut. The town is part of the Western Connecticut Planning Region. The town is served by Route 57 and Route 53, both of which run through the town center. Approximately 19% of the town's workforce commutes to New York City, about 45 miles (72 km) to the southwest.

In 2017, SafeWise ranked Weston the safest town in Connecticut and the sixth safest town in the country.

Weston is the closest Connecticut town to New York City without a train station. Aside from a handful of stores that form the town's center, Weston has little commercial development and residential development is limited by two-acre zoning. Most of Devil's Den Preserve, a 1,746-acre (707 ha) nature reserve, which gets 40,000 visits a year, is located in the town.

== History ==
Town sign for Weston (front)

In the 17th century, Weston's first English settlers were mostly farmers living in the town of Fairfield, Connecticut, the boundaries of which extended to Weston until the late 18th century. The Norfield Parish was created in the area now occupied by the towns of Weston and Easton. In 1787, the area was formally incorporated as the Town of Weston. It is believed to be named after Weston-super-Mare, which was a small fishing village surrounded by countryside farmland, which many of the early British farming settlers originated from. In 1845, the Town of Easton was split off from Weston.

A meteor exploded above the town on December 14, 1807. Six pieces, totaling 28 pounds (13 kg), were recovered and examined by scientists, who issued a report. This experience provided information that expanded the contemporary thinking about meteors for many.

Despite rocky soil, farmers in town grew apples, onions, and potatoes. Grist, cider, lumber, and fulling mills were built. The town had nine manufacturers by 1850, but two decades later only the Bradley Edge Tool Company still thrived. That factory burned down in 1911.

Unlike other nearby towns, Weston never had a railroad built through it, which stifled the development of non-agricultural businesses. Between the Civil War and the Great Depression, the town's population dropped from approximately 1,000 to a low of 670, by 1930. Artists, writers, and actors from New York became attracted to the community in the 1930s and began settling in it. Construction of the Merritt Parkway, which arrived to the south of Weston in 1938, resulted in further population growth.

== Geography ==
According to the United States Census Bureau, the town has a total area of 20.7 square miles (54 km^{2}), of which 19.8 square miles (51 km^{2}) is land and 0.9 square miles (2.3 km^{2}), or 4.39%, is water.

The Saugatuck River begins to the north in Redding. It flows through the town and ends in Long Island Sound in neighboring Westport.

Weston is bordered by Westport to the south, Wilton to the west, Redding to the north, Easton to the east, and Fairfield to the southeast.

=== Principal communities ===
- Georgetown (part)
- Lyons Plains
- Weston Center (Norfield Historic District)
- Aspetuck

Other minor communities and geographic areas are Devil's Den, Norfield, Upper Parish, and Valley Forge.

== Demographics ==
Historical population
Census	Pop.	Note	%±
1790	2,469		—
1800	2,680		8.5%
1810	2,618		−2.3%
1820	2,767		5.7%
1830	2,997		8.3%
1840	2,561		−14.5%
1850	1,056		−58.8%
1860	1,117		5.8%
1870	1,054		−5.6%
1880	918		−12.9%
1890	772		−15.9%
1900	840		8.8%
1910	831		−1.1%
1920	703		−15.4%
1930	670		−4.7%
1940	1,053		57.2%
1950	1,988		88.8%
1960	4,039		103.2%
1970	7,417		83.6%
1980	8,284		11.7%
1990	8,648		4.4%
2000	10,037		16.1%
2010	10,179		1.4%
2020	10,354		1.7%
U.S. Decennial Census

As of the 2010 census, there were 10,025 people, 3,289 households, and 2,811 families residing in the town. The population density was 506.0 inhabitants per square mile (195.4/km^{2}). There were 3,629 housing units at an average density of 178.4 per square mile (68.9/km^{2}). The racial makeup of the town was 95.75% White, 0.88% African American, 0.11% Native American, 1.94% Asian, 0.10% Pacific Islander, 0.25% from other races, and 0.98% from two or more races. Hispanic or Latino of any race were 2.05% of the population.

There were 3,289 households, out of which 49.8% had children under the age of 18 living with them, 78.4% were married couples living together, 5.0% had a female householder with no husband present, and 15.1% were non-families. 11.2% of all households were made up of individuals, and 4.9% had someone living alone who was 65 years of age or older. The average household size was 3.03 and the average family size was 3.28.

In the town, the age of the population is spread out, with 31% under the age of 18, 4% from 18 to 24, 31% from 25 to 49, 23% from 50 to 64, and 11% who were 65 years of age or older. The median age was 42 years. For every 100 females, there were 96.5 males. For every 100 females age 18 and over, there were 92.9 males.

As of 2017, the median income for a household in the town was $219,868. Males had a median income of $168,472 versus $103,345 for females. The per capita income for the town was $95,534. About 2.6% of the population were below the poverty line.

In 2019, The National Council for Home Safety and Security ranked Weston the 4th safest town in the state of Connecticut. The National Council for Home Safety and Security ranked the safest towns and cities in Connecticut based on the most recent FBI Uniform Crime Report statistics and population sizes.

== Government ==
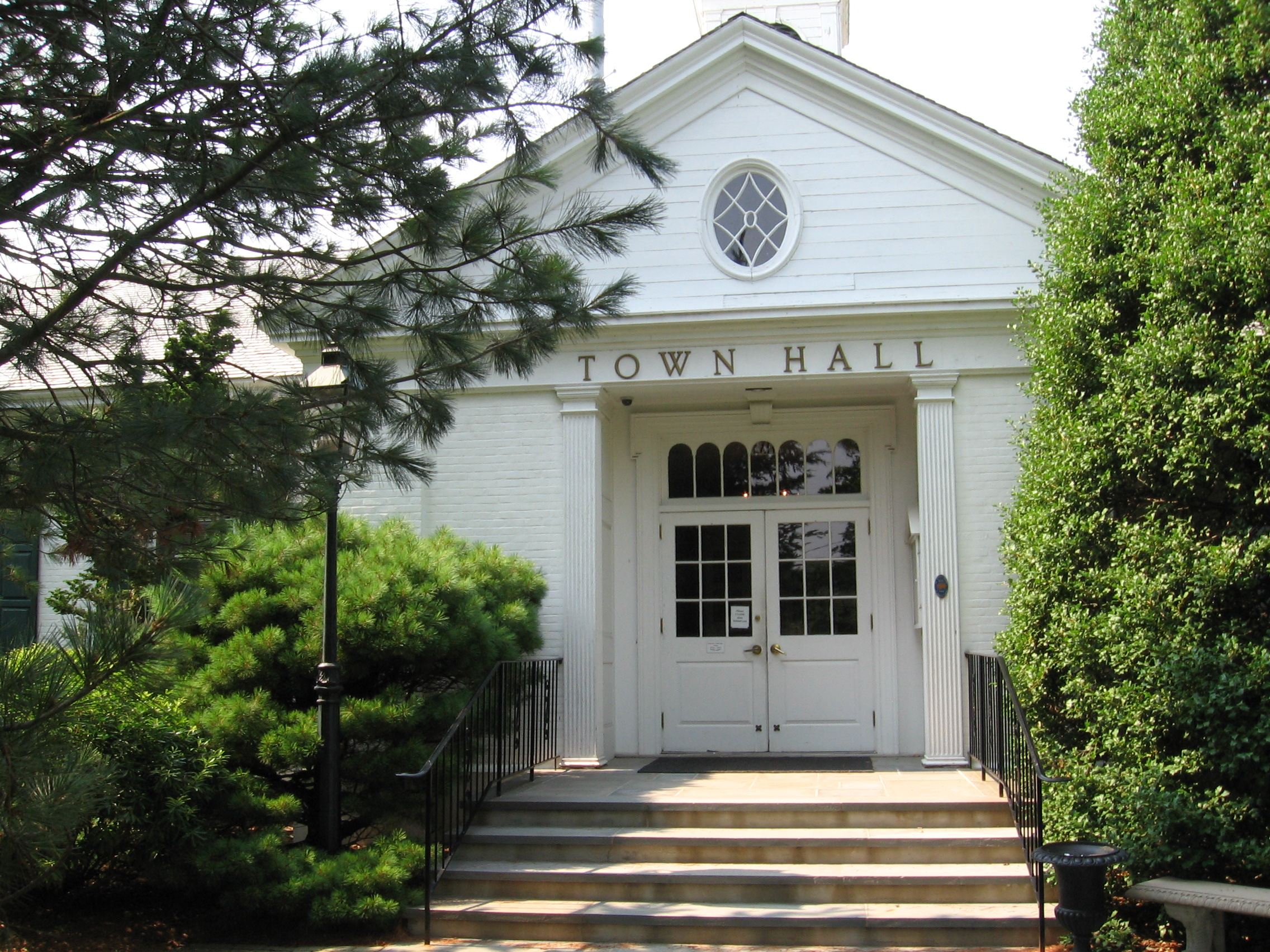
Entrance to Town Hall

Like many other New England towns, the government of Weston consists of the Town Meeting, and elective and appointive boards. First among the elective boards is the Board of Selectmen. Samantha Nestor is the First Selectwoman. By charter, the First Selectman is the Chief Executive and Administrative Officer of the town. The town's legislative powers are divided between the Board of Selectmen and the Town Meeting. Among other elective boards are the Board of Education, the Board of Finance, the Planning and Zoning Commission, and the Board of Police Commissioners.

On August 19, 2021, Martin Mohabeer became the first African-American to become a member of the Board of Selectmen when the Board voted to appoint him to fill a vacant seat. His subsequent election to a new two year term in November 2021 marked the first time an African-American was elected in Weston.

In the 2008 presidential election, Weston residents voted for Democrat Barack Obama with 62.21%. Republican John McCain received 37.33%. In 2016, Democrat Hillary Clinton carried Weston over Republican Donald Trump.

=== Budget and taxes ===
For the fiscal year of 2023-2024, the Town of Weston’s net budget is about $80-million. About 73% of the town’s budget is spent on the Weston Public Schools. Weston raises taxes on the basis of property value. With real estate assessed at 70% of market value, the mill rate evolved as follows:

Fiscal year	Mill rate
2004–2005	24.07*
2005–2006	26.21*
2005–2007	27.04*
2007–2008	27.81*
2008–2009	28.58*
2009–2010	28.90*
2010–2011	29.21*
2011–2012	29.31*

Fiscal year	Mill rate
2012–2013	29.41*
2013–2014	29.25*
2014–2015	30.02*
2015–2016	30.48*
2016–2017	30.36*
2017-2018	30.73*
2018-2019	31.24*
2019-2020	32.37

Fiscal year	Mill rate
2020–2021	32.37
2021–2022	32.92
2022–2023	32.97
2023–2024	33.06

To make the mill rates comparable, the asterisked numbers are adjusted to account for the real estate revaluation of 2018-2019. The revaluation decreased the grand list by 6.3 percent. The numbers for 2013-2014 and prior years are also adjusted for revaluations in 2014 and 2009, respectively.

== Town Center ==
Commercial development in Weston is limited to the Town Center area located at the intersection of Weston Road and Norfield Road. The Town Center contains a grocery store, community bank, liquor store, casual restaurant, dry cleaner, realtor, gas station, pharmacy and a post office.

== On the National Register of Historic Places ==
- Bradley Edge Tool Company Historic District – Roughly, Lyons Plains Road, north and south of the junction with White Birch Road (added December 22, 1995)
- Kettle Creek Historic District – Roughly, Weston and Old Weston Roads, north of Broad Street (added December 22, 1995)
- Norfield Historic District – Roughly, at the junction of Weston and Norfield Roads northeast to Hedgerow Common (added August 31, 1991)

== Education ==
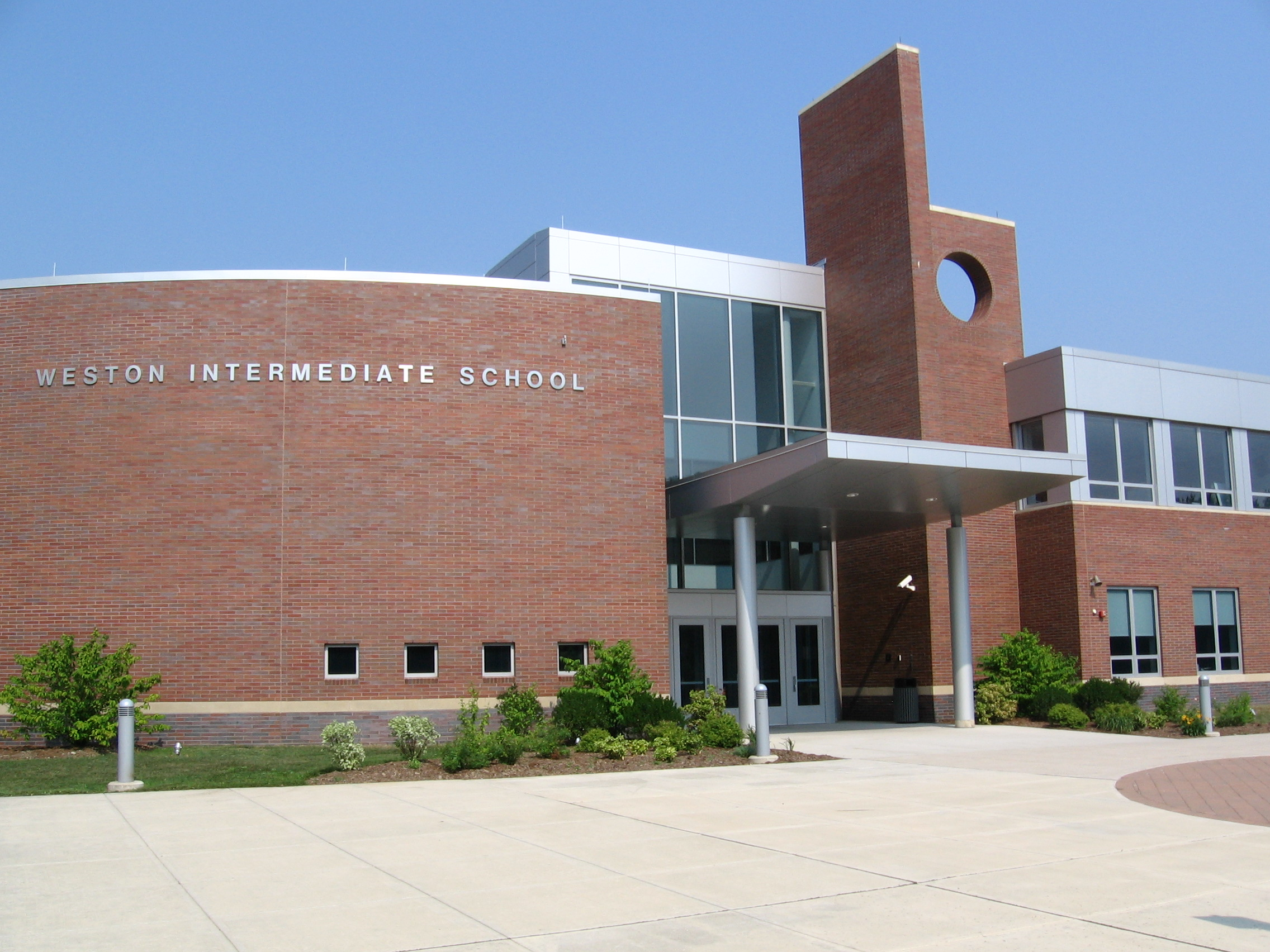
Weston Intermediate School entrance

There are four public schools in the Weston Public Schools district, all located on School Road:

- Weston High School (WHS) – grades 9–12, with about 800 students. Most Weston High School (WHS) seniors go on to attend selective colleges and universities. Recently the high school underwent a significant building expansion, which included construction of a new science department and playing fields. The high school auditorium was also updated in 2008.
- Weston Middle School (WMS) – grades 6–8, with about 600 students.
- Weston Intermediate School (WIS) – grades 3–5, with about 600 students. The school opened in September 2005 as the town's newest school.
- Hurlbutt Elementary School (HES) – pre-kindergarten-grade 2, with about 600 students

In June 2012, 24/7 Wall St. ranked Weston as the second wealthiest school district in the United States.

In 2013 and 2014, U.S. News & World Report ranked Weston High School as the third best high school in Connecticut and the 240th best high school in the United States.

Weston High School was awarded the gold medal for its high level of student performance. The methodology of ranking this honor is based on student performance on standardized tests as well as participation in Advanced Placement (AP) and International Baccalaureate (IB) programs. AP programs are offered across a variety of subject matters, with sixty percent of WHS students participating.

In August 2015, Newsweek ranked Weston High School number 47 for America's Top High Schools in the country, public and private.

In August 2015, Weston High School was ranked the best in the state and 47th best in the country according to a survey conducted by Newsweek magazine. Each year, the magazine ranks the top 500 high schools in the country based on which institutions do the best job of preparing students for college. According to the study, Weston High School has a 97.2% college enrollment rate, a 100% graduation rate, an AP/IB/Dual Enrollment Composite of 73, a weighted SAT/ACT score composite of 69.4, a student retention rate of 91.7% and a counselor-to-student ratio of 1:156. In addition, the average SAT score at Weston High School is 1784, the average ACT score is 26.6, and the average AP test score is 3.87. [

In April 2019, U.S. News & World Report ranked Weston High School second best high school in the state and 169th best high school in the country out of 17,245 high schools ranked. In addition, Weston High School was also ranked 65th in STEM High Schools with a town graduation rate of 100%. U.S. News gave Weston a scorecard of 99.02% out of a possible 100. The Best High Schools rankings identify the country's top-performing public high schools. The goal is to provide a clear, unbiased picture of how well public schools serve all of their students—from the highest to lowest achieving—in preparing them to demonstrate proficiency in basic skills as well as readiness for college-level work.

The Connecticut State Department of Education has ranked the Weston schools in District Reference Group A (formerly the Educational Reference Group A), the nine most affluent and low-need-for-extra-assistance districts among the 162 school districts in Connecticut.

Several pre-schools in town are run by various churches, including Emmanuel Nursery School and Norfield Nursery School.

== Parks ==
The landscape of Weston is characterized by open spaces. Almost one quarter of the town is permanently devoted to open space use, including:

- Devil's Den Preserve, with a wide variety of flora and fauna, and with a 20-mile (32 km) trail system that connects with the extended 70-mile (110 km) Saugatuck Valley Trails System;
- Bisceglie Park, with three pickleball courts, baseball fields, a swimming hole, a two-mile (3 km) jogging trail and fitness stations, along the west branch of the Saugatuck River;
- Morehouse Farm Park, with eight, partially overlapping ball fields;
- Sixteen preserves of the Aspetuck Land Trust, for a total of 645 acres (2.61 km^{2}), scattered all around town;
- Katherine Ordway Preserve, with 62 acres (250,000 m^{2}) of woodland, three miles (5 km) of trails and an arboretum;
- Keene Park, with 6 acres (24,000 m^{2}), with a small playground and park is along the each branch of the Saugatuck River;
- Lachat Town Farm
- Open land around the Saugatuck Reservoir, with trails and opportunities for fishing.

== Politics ==
Weston town vote by party in presidential elections
Year	Democratic	Republican	Third Parties
2024	69.18% 4,294	28.95% 1,797	1.87% 116
2020	72.57% 4,733	25.76% 1,680	1.03% 234
2016	66.65% 3,807	28.59% 1,633	4.76% 272
2012	53.27% 2,947	45.84% 2,536	0.89% 49
2008	62.21% 3,571	37.33% 2,143	0.46% 26
2004	55.90% 3,136	42.96% 2,410	1.14% 64
2000	52.07% 2,767	43.88% 2,332	4.05% 215
1996	46.69% 2,252	45.97% 2,217	7.34% 354
1992	41.56% 2,306	42.65% 2,366	15.79% 876
1988	37.89% 1,901	61.43% 3,082	0.68% 34
1984	32.68% 1,639	66.92% 3,356	0.40% 20
1980	23.73% 1,117	59.91% 2,820	16.36% 770
1976	36.55% 1,608	63.06% 2,774	0.39% 17
1972	36.73% 1,500	62.24% 2,542	1.03% 42
1968	38.14% 1,246	59.35% 1,939	2.51% 82
1964	57.36% 1,473	42.64% 1,095	0.00% 0
1960	30.51% 655	69.49% 1,492	0.00% 0
1956	26.41% 455	73.59% 1,268	0.00% 0

Voter registration and party enrollment as of October 26, 2021
Party	Active voters	Inactive voters	Total voters	Percentage
Democratic	2,902	273	3,175	39.51%
Republican	1,455	158	1,613	20.07%
Unaffiliated	2,873	303	3,130	38.95%
Minor parties	104	14	118	1.47%
Total	7,288	748	8,036	100%

== Notable people ==
- Lucie Arnaz (born 1951), actress, daughter of Lucille Ball and Desi Arnaz
- George Balanchine (1904–1983), choreographer and influential figure in ballet
- Paul Cadmus (1904–1999), painter
- Liz Cho (born 1970), television anchor
- Frank Converse (born 1938), actor
- John Curran (1953–2013), financial journalist
- Rodney Dangerfield (1921–2004), comedian
- Bette Davis (1908–1989), actress
- Kyle Dunnigan (born 1971), comedian and actor
- José Feliciano (born 1945), singer and songwriter
- Daniel Gerroll actor, Chariots of Fire
- Michel Gill (born 1960), actor, Pres. Walker, House of Cards, Mr. Robot (Golden Globe/ensemble), writer, producer
- Seth Grahame-Smith (born 1976), author, screenwriter, film and television producer and director, grew up in town
- Patti Hansen (born 1956), model, actress and wife of Keith Richards
- John Marshall Harlan II (1899–1971), Associate Justice of the Supreme Court, summered in Weston, buried in Weston's Emmanuel churchyard
- Kellie Nalbandian (born 1993), contestant on Survivor season 45
- Jayne Atkinson (born 1959), Emmy-winning actor (ensemble, "24"), writer, producer (Hidden Meadow)
- Mariette Hartley (born 1940), actress, native of Weston
- Fred Hellerman (1927-2016), singer and songwriter, founding member of the Weavers. Hellerman died on September 1, 2016, at his home in Weston
- Evan Hunter (1926–2005), author who wrote under the pen name "Ed McBain"
- Erica Jong (born 1942), author
- Patricia Kalember actor, thirtysomething and Sisters
- Eartha Kitt (1927–2008), entertainer, moved to town in 2002
- Lawrence Langner (1890–1962), playwright, author, and producer. Lived on what is now called Langner Lane
- Eva Le Gallienne (1899–1991), actress
- Billy Mann (born 1968), songwriter, record producer
- Stanley Matthews, former Wimbledon Boys' Champion and son of Sir Stanley Matthews
- Paul Michael Levesque (born 1969), "Triple H", wrestler, World Wrestling Entertainment
- Marilyn Monroe (1926-1962), actress, lived on Fanton Hill in 1955 after completing the Seven Year Itch
- Brent Musburger (born 1939), sportscaster
- James Naughton (born 1945), actor
- Victor Niederhoffer (1943– 2026), hedge fund manager, U.S. Squash Champion and Paddleball Champion, bestselling author, and statistician.
- Jane Paknia (born 2000), musician
- Sachi Parker (born 1956), actress, daughter of Shirley Maclaine, frequent visitor of Weston
- Jacob Pitts (born 1979), actor
- Christopher Plummer (1929–2021), actor
- Paul Rand (1914–1996), graphic designer
- Robert Redford (1936–2025), actor, had a home in town
- Fritz Reiner (1888–1963), conductor of the New York Philharmonic, the Metropolitan Opera, and other notable orchestras. Lived on Davis Hill beginning in 1938
- Jamey Richard (born 1984), pro football player
- Keith Richards (born 1943), musician, member of The Rolling Stones
- Angelo and Ettore Rossetti, Guinness World Record holders in racket sports
- John Seigenthaler, Jr. (born 1955), former NBC News weekend anchor
- James Thurber (1894–1961), writer
- Willard Thorp Harry Truman‘s Assistant Secretary of State, among other roles
- Mike Vranos (born 1961), hedge fund manager and philanthropist
