= George Weston (physicist) =

British physicist (1925–2009)

George Frederick Weston
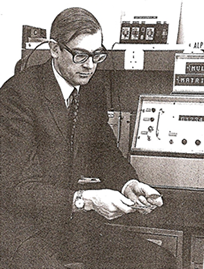
- Weston working on the matrix tube display
- Born: 2 February 1925; Catford, London, England
- Died: 25 July 2009 (aged 84); Dorking, Surrey
- Education: London University
- Known for: Ultrahigh vacuum practice; Glow discharge display; Cold cathode glow discharge tubes; Alphanumeric displays
- Scientific career
- Fields: Physics
- Workplaces: Mullard Research Laboratories

George Frederick Weston (2 February 1925 – 25 July 2009) was an English physicist and author. He is best known for his work associated with cold cathode glow discharge devices, and has published over a dozen papers and a book dealing with the subject. In 1956, Weston took leadership of a small group of physicists, investigating cold cathode tubes, which gained a reputation as one of the foremost research units in the field. George Weston has a MSc degree and is a Fellow of the Institute of Physics.

== Early life ==
George Weston was born in Catford, London, where he attended St. Dunstans College but later moved with his family to Reigate, Surrey due to the school's involvement in the World War II evacuation program.
