= Jerome Weston, 2nd Earl of Portland =

English diplomat and landowner

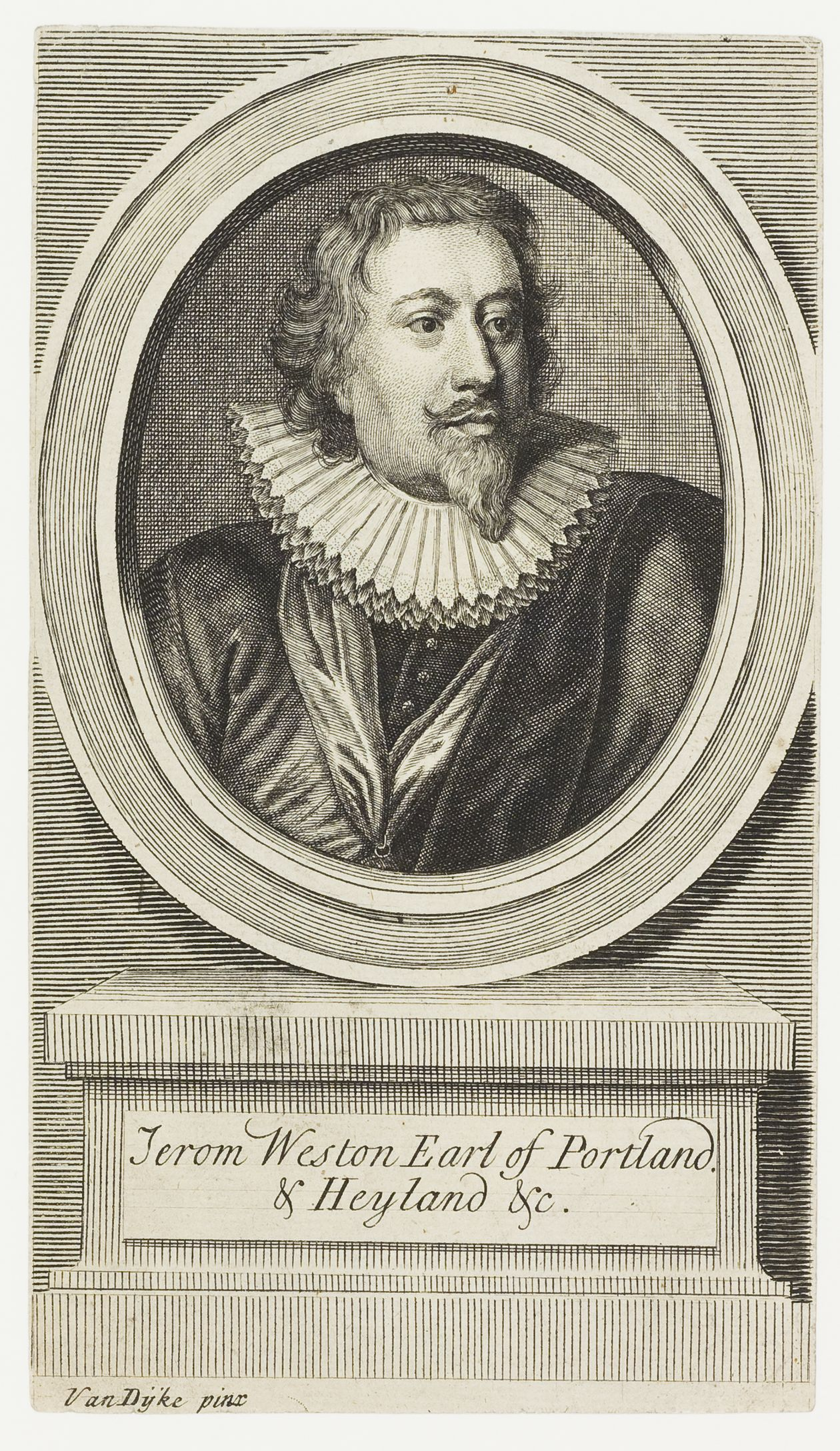
Jerome Weston, 2nd Earl of Portland

Jerome Weston, 2nd Earl of Portland (16 December 1605 – 17 March 1663) was an English diplomat and landowner who held the presidency of Munster, Kingdom of Ireland.

== Life ==
He was the second, but the eldest surviving son, of the 1st Earl of Portland, by his second wife Frances Walgrave. He was born at Nayland in Suffolk, England.

Weston was elected to Parliament as member for Gatton on 11 March 1628, but there was a double return. Weston was one of four members returned for two seats, the other three being Sir Samuel Owfield, Sir Charles Howard and Sir Thomas Lake. Weston's election was declared void on 26 March, when Owfield and Howard were instead declared elected. Weston was instead returned for the vacant seat at Lewes, after the previous holder, Sir George Goring, was elevated to the peerage.

In 1632 and 1633, he undertook a diplomatic mission to the courts of France, Savoy, Florence and Venice. He succeeded his father as Earl of Portland in 1635.

Supplementing Portland's estates, in 1663 Charles II granted Coulsdon manor in Surrey, which had no male heir, to "Jerome second Earl of Portland" in consideration of his surrender of the presidency of Munster to the Crown.

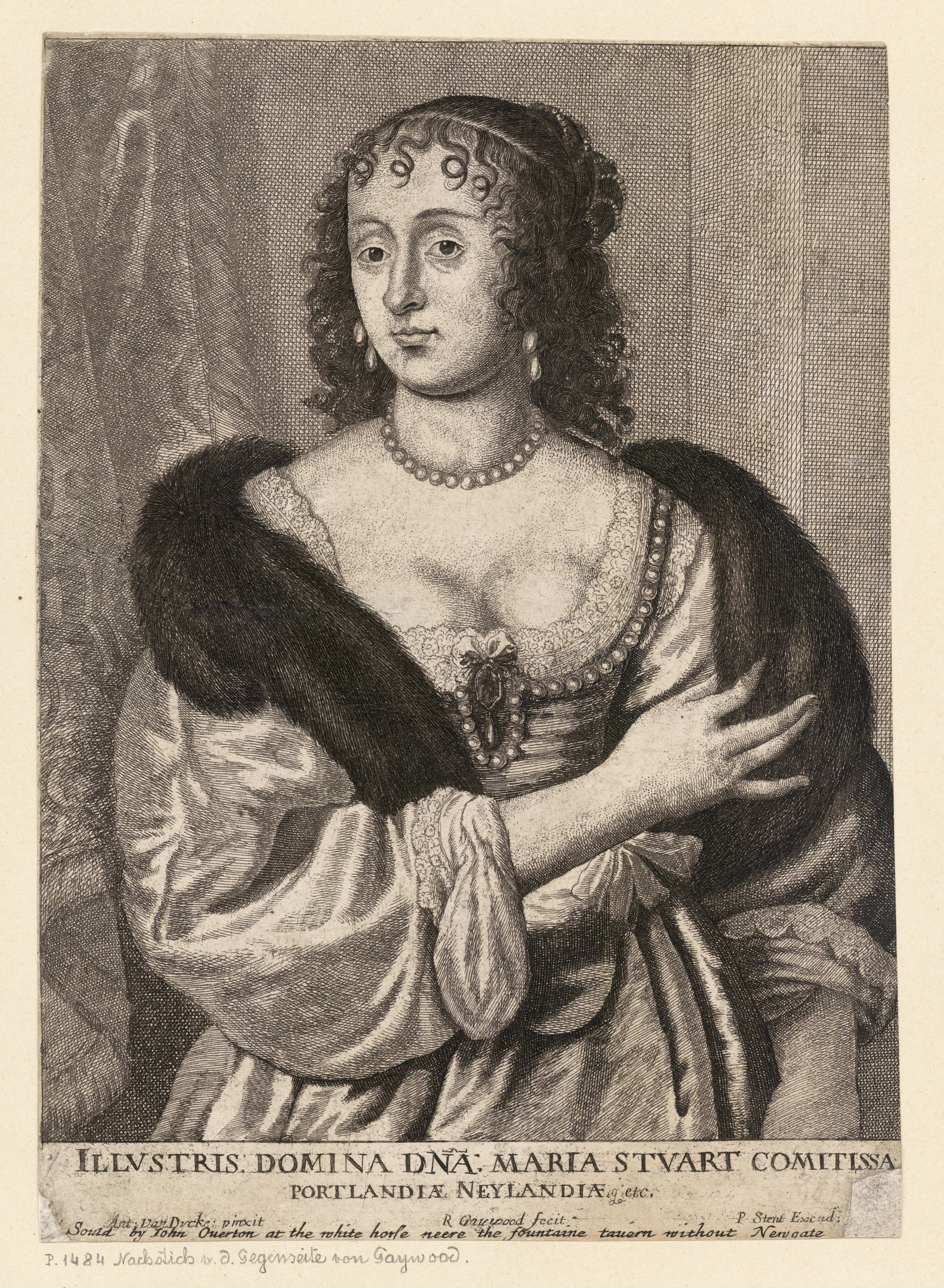
Engraving of Frances Stuart, Countess of Portland by Wenceslas Hollar after Anthony van Dyck

== Family ==
Lord Portland married Lady Frances Stuart (19 March 1617 − 13 March 1694), a daughter of the 3rd Duke of Lennox, on 10 June 1632. He was succeeded by their son Charles.

He was a first cousin of Jeremy Clarke, a Governor of Rhode Island in the American Colonies.

Parliament of England
Preceded by Anthony Stapley; Sir George Goring	Member of Parliament for Lewes; 1628–1629; With: Anthony Stapley	Parliament suspended until 1640
Political offices
Unknown	Governor of the Isle of Wight; 1633–1642	Succeeded by The Earl of Pembroke (Parliamentary)
Preceded by The Earl of Portland	Lord Lieutenant of Hampshire; 1635–1646; With: The Earl of Southampton 1641–1646 and The Duke of Richmond	English Interregnum
Preceded by The Earl of Portland	Vice-Admiral of Hampshire; 1635–1646	Vacant Title next held by The Earl of Pembroke (Parliamentary)
Honorary titles
Preceded by Sir Anthony Ashley Cooper	Vice-Admiral of Hampshire; 1660–1662	Succeeded by The Lord Colepeper
Preceded by Sir Anthony Ashley Cooper	Governor of the Isle of Wight; 1660–1661	Succeeded by The Lord Colepeper
Peerage of England
Preceded by Richard Weston	Earl of Portland; 1635–1663	Succeeded by Charles Weston
