= Ballybane =

Suburb of Galway, Ireland

Ballybane An Baile Bán
- Suburb
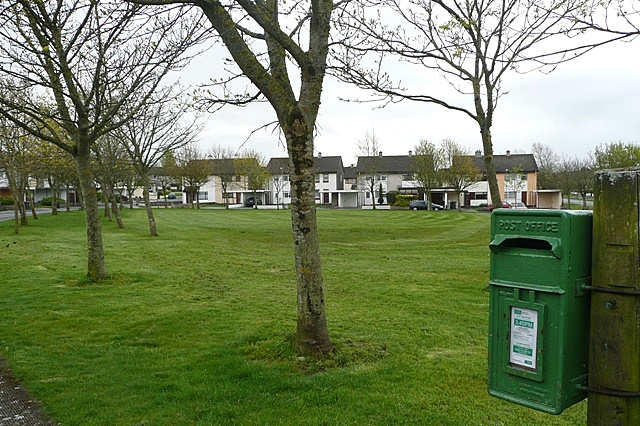
- A housing estate in Ballybane

- Location in Ireland
- Coordinates: 53°17′03″N 9°00′23″W
- Country: Ireland
- Province: Connacht
- County: County Galway
- Time zone: UTC+0 (WET)
  - Summer (DST): UTC-1 (IST (WEST))

Ballybane (Irish: An Baile Bán, meaning 'the white homestead') is a suburb of Galway city in County Galway, Ireland. Ballybane is an ill-defined area, but is roughly bounded by the Old Dublin Road (R338) to the south, Mervue to the west, Ballybrit to the north, and Doughiska to the east. The townland of Ballybaan More (An Baile Bán Mór) is in the civil parish of Saint Nicholas and the historical barony of Galway.

== History ==
=== Development ===
Evidence of ancient settlement in the area includes ringfort and souterrain sites in the townland of Ballybaan More. The ruins of the medieval church of St. James, and an associated graveyard, are in nearby Ballybaan Beg townland.

The area was developed in the late 20th century, with the Ballybane shopping centre opening in 1981 and the local Catholic parish (St Brigid's) dating to 1995.

=== 21st century ===
In May 2019, it was reported in the Irish Times that the Traveller halting sites of Clós na Choile and Fana Glas, both located in Ballybane, were in need of works to rectify ongoing issues with damp and mould, heating, overflowing sewerage systems, and the lack of playing areas for children.

The following month (in the weeks preceding the 2019 Irish local elections), Independent councillor Noel Larkin released drone footage showing burnt out houses in the Fána Glas housing estate with piles of rubbish scattered around them. The three occupied houses were in good condition, however the remaining five were "destroyed", having been "boarded up, their roofs either missing or almost totally stripped of slates (or) filled with rubbish". Cllr Larkin said that he "hired the drone to show the 'wanton destruction' of council-owned property and the 'atrocious lack of respect' to taxpayers by those who caused it". Some local residents said they were happy that Larkin had released the footage, as it highlighted the issue of illegal dumping. A spokesman for Galway City Council said it was impossible to know "with certainty how the homes had fallen into such disrepair or who was responsible for the damage and dumping".

As of the 2020s, there were a number of other reports of antisocial behaviour in the area.

In January 2024, as part of Irish anti-immigration protests, a demonstration was held in Ballybane by local residents in opposition to the planned introduction of 150 refugees in the locality. Locals complained that they hadn't been consulted in the plans.

== Education ==
The Galway city branch of the Atlantic Technological University (formerly GMIT until April 2022) is located at the southern end of the suburb, next to the Old Dublin Road. Owing to its proximity, many students live in the Ballybane area, and student residences have been built to cater for them, such as at Glasán Student Village.

The Ballybane Community Resource Centre offers community education courses, including in subjects such as cookery, yoga, beauty courses and D.I.Y.

== Facilities ==
Ballybane Shopping Centre is located in the suburb. Until November 2021, a branch of Irish supermarket Joyce's existed onsite until the chain was purchased by Tesco Ireland.

A pub named the Lantern Bar operated in Ballybane until 2019 when it was closed following complaints and incidents in which Garda Síochána (Irish police) callouts were required. A 2022 news article, on GalwayBeo, suggested that the pub "could reopen soon".

St. Brigid's Catholic church is located off Castlepark Road in the locality.

Community groups in the locality include a men's shed and Ballybane community garden. Ballybane is also the site of one of only three libraries that are operated by Galway City Council in the environs of the city.

== Notable residents ==
Former or current residents of the suburb have included:

- Baba Adeeko (born 2003), Irish professional footballer who plays for Wigan Athletic
- Michael Faherty (1934–2010), Ballybane pensioner who died in Ireland's first reputed case of death by spontaneous human combustion
- Gerry Healy (1913–1989), Irish-born British political activist, was born in Ballybane

== See also ==
- St James' GAA
- Merlinpark Castle, a nearby castle dating from the 12th century
