= Pat Quinn (businessman) =

Irish businessman, founder of the Quinnsworth supermarket chain

- Born: 1 July 1935; Cloone, County Leitrim, Irish Free State (now Ireland)
- Died: 23 November 2009 (aged 74); Toronto, Ontario, Canada
- Occupation: Founder of Quinnsworth
- Spouse: Anne
- Children: Bernard, Patrick, Lisa, Gavin, Paul, Tanya, Barry-John

Pat Quinn (1 July 1935 – 23 November 2009) was an Irish publican, hotelier, music promoter, storyteller, former millionaire and founder of the Quinnsworth (now Tesco Ireland) group, Ireland's first supermarket chain. He invented the term "yellow pack". According to The Irish Times, he was "one of the country's best-known business figures in the 1960s and 1970s", "the whizz kid of the Irish grocery business" and "a well-known figure in the Irish-Canadian community" at his death. He worked, honeymooned and eventually settled with his family in Toronto. The Toronto Sun described him as "County Leitrim's favourite son".

== Early life ==
Quinn was born on 1 July 1935 and grew up in Cloone, County Leitrim. His mother ran McNamee's, a nearby public house and grocery store, and his father was a local member of the Garda Síochána. The family were also funeral undertakers. His brothers Fersey, Fintan, and Kevin, and sister Annette Maher survived him, though another sister, Mary Lynch, died before him. Quinn boarded at St. Mel's College, County Longford.

== Business life ==
=== Woolworths and family business ===
Quinn began work as a stockboy at Woolworths in Limerick, being promoted to the position of store manager at the age of 22. In 1958, Quinn and his uncle, Peter Quinn, opened Quinn Co on Longford's Main Street.

=== Promoter of music events ===
Quinn was a promoter of music events during the 1960s in Ireland. He hosted events at Quinn County, featuring pop stars such as Joe Dolan, The Drifters and the Royal Showband. He met his future wife, Anne, at one of these performances in 1960.

Quinn advanced his knowledge of the grocery and music business in Canada, and promoted artists such as The Beach Boys, Johnny Cash, The Dave Clark Five, The Dubliners, Roy Orbison and The Supremes. He introduced the Rolling Stones to North America in 1965, with Canadian police being called to a riot at the band's debut concert in London, Ontario.

=== H. Williams and Quinnsworth ===
Quinn returned to his homeland in 1965 when he was hired as general manager of the H Williams supermarket group. He asked them to open a branch of their chain in the new shopping centre in Stillorgan in Dublin. When they refused, Quinn established his first Quinnsworth supermarket at the Stillorgan Shopping Centre in December of the following year, inspired by the Woolworths brand. He worked alongside his wife to clean up in the evenings after the store closed. Quinn opened six stores and made £6 million within five years.

Upon learning that the fee to hire football player George Best to open one of his stores was £1,000, Quinn donated the money to charity instead, believing he had a high enough profile to perform the ceremony on his own.

==== Rival stores ====
Quinn's supermarket rivals were other Irish stores such as Dunnes Stores and Superquinn, the latter of which had to change its name to avoid confusion with Quinnsworth.

=== Sale ===
Quinn sold his Quinnsworth chain to Galen Weston's Associated British Foods in the early 1970s, becoming a millionaire at the age of 36. By the time he sold Quinnsworth he had stores in Crumlin, Ballymun, Dundrum, Rathfarnham, Douglas, Wilton, Galway and Shannon.

=== Promotion and style ===
Quinn is noted for participating in his own advertising, wearing a white polo neck jumper in "the fashion and retailing statement of the late 1960s", as Sam Smyth dubbed it in the Irish Independent after his death. Quinn's love for polo necks led him to arrive at one funeral dressed in a pink polo neck.

=== Hospitality businesses ===
Quinn purchased several Irish pubs, such as the Dead Man's Inn in Palmerstown (closed in 1975) and Mooneys (which went into receivership).

He went on to set up a hotel and sports complex in Kilternan, County Dublin. Quinn's intention had been to create a similar facility to that seen in The Shining, but the 1973 oil crisis disrupted this plan. The Pat Quinn Club later was called "one of the most spectacular [Irish] business failures on record".

Quinn opened three pool halls, initially above Rathmines's Stella cinema and later in Bray and Drogheda and also set up an "executive coach service" for businessmen travelling around Ireland.

There were also discount stores in Ballymun and Finglas, Ringsend's Pierrot snooker and gaming club and the Shoparound Centre on Dublin's South Great George's Street.

The last venture shut in early 1986 following below average Christmas trading in 1985. Quinn moved to Toronto in 1986, emigrating to escape the recession which gripped Ireland at this time.

=== Later years ===
Quinn initially sold books and crisps in Canada. He set up his first bar there in 2001. His family are known in Canada for their Toronto restaurants and pubs, which include the "Irish Embassy" and "PJ O'Brien's", as well as one Montreal bar. He appeared in the Toronto Star's business section to demonstrate his prowess in the Canadian business industry. Quinn also continued his music promotion after his return to Canada.

== Personal life ==
Quinn purchased a house in Killiney and two Rolls-Royce cars, one silver and one Maroon with a telephone, and a third car, a Mercedes for the family. He owned three racehorses, one which was called "Lucky Leitrim".

Quinn and his wife, Anne, had their honeymoon in Toronto, a place where they were to spend much of their life from then onwards. They had seven children Bernard, Patrick, Lisa, Gavin, Paul, Tanya and Barry-John. Two became orthodontists, one works in the medical profession and the other four succeeded Quinn in his Canadian pub business.

=== Death ===
He died in Canada on 23 November 2009, aged 74, when he succumbed to kidney failure. Senator Feargal Quinn, the founder of rival Superquinn, remarked upon the death of his namesake: "He certainly changed retailing in Ireland [...] He was always on the microphone in the shop giving away cars and houses". Louis Copeland, the tailor responsible for the suits he wore in his advertisements, commented: "I remember going to his house in Killiney and the phone never stopped, calls from people down the country looking for jobs. And Pat tried to fix something for all of them." Quinn's funeral at St. Michael's Cathedral on 28 November 2009 was attended by more than 800 people, including the mayor of Toronto. Tenor Colm Wilkinson sang the hymn "Amazing Grace". Irish ambassador to Canada, Declan Kelly, described Quinn and his wife as "the embodiment of Ireland".
