= Self-ignition =

Self-ignition can refer to:

- spontaneous combustion or
- the ability of diesel fuel to ignite under high compression in diesel engines.

== See also ==
- Self-ignition temperature
