= St James' GAA =

St James' GAA may refer to:

- St James' GAA (Cork), a sports club in Ardfield–Rathbarry, Ireland
- St James' GAA (Galway), a sports club in Doughiska, Ireland
- St James' GAA (Wexford), a sports club in Ramsgrange, Ireland
