= Joyce's (supermarket) =

Irish supermarket chain

- Type: Private
- Industry: Retail
- Founded: 1951
- Founder: Patrick Joyce (senior), Pat Joyce
- Fate: Acquired by Tesco Ireland on 30 November 2021. Oranmore supermarket acquired by Musgrave Group.
- Successor: Tesco Ireland; SuperValu
- Headquarters: Headford, County Galway, Ireland (former) Oranmore, County Galway, Ireland
- Number of locations: 9
- Products: consumer goods
- Number of employees: 200
- Website: http://joycesupermarket.ie/

Joyce's, formerly Joyces 365, was a supermarket chain based in Headford, County Galway, Ireland.

== Locations ==
The chain had nine supermarkets, with five located in County Galway towns (Headford, Oranmore, Tuam, Inverin and Athenry) and four in the Galway city areas of Knocknacarra, Doughiska, Ballybane and Claddagh.

== History ==
Joyces 365 was founded in 1951 and had around 230 employees. Pat Joyce was the owner and manager of the supermarket chain.

The late 1970s saw two new developments with "Joyce & Sons Headford Ltd" as a hardware business and "Kevin Joyce" as a drapery business by brother of Patrick Joyce (senior), which opened on 8 December 1978 and closed on 20 May 2023.

In 1982, a second supermarket opened at the site of Walsh's Bakery in Headford.

In 1991, the two were made bigger by buying Monaghan's Stationery Shop nearby to create a filling station in 1992.

On 10 May 1999, Joyce's opened a new shop in Knocknacarra, and in 2005 opened a third shop in Athenry. In June 2008, Joyce's became the supply chain of Nisa in Ireland.

In November 2010, Joyce's announced that it would open a supermarket in the Tuam shopping centre.

In July 2014, Joyce's took over the SuperValu supermarket in Inverin, "Siopa an Phobail", which had been in receivership for more than two years.

In 2017, Joyce's took over the Galway-based Nestor's Supermarket Group, which had been franchised as SuperValu stores (and Centra, in the case of the Doughiska branch), and rebranded all of its supermarkets under its own name.

On 30 November 2021, Tesco Ireland announced it had purchased all Joyce's supermarkets for an undisclosed amount, and the shops began to be rebranded as Tesco in 2022. The Oranmore supermarket was not included in the rebrand because Tesco had agreed to sell it to a competitor, in order to allay the Competition and Consumer Protection Commission's concerns at the time of acquisition, due to a Tesco supermarket being already present in the town.

In November 2023, it was announced that the Musgrave Group were to buy the Oranmore supermarket from Tesco Ireland, and that it would be rebranded as SuperValu, putting an end to Joyce's after 74 years.
