= List of shipwrecks in September 1834 =

The list of shipwrecks in September 1834 includes ships sunk, foundered, wrecked, grounded or otherwise lost during September 1834.

== 2 September ==
List of shipwrecks: 2 September 1834
Ship	State	Description
Delta	France	The brig was wrecked at Tampico, Mexico. She was on a voyage from Sète, Hérault to Pará, Brazil.
Elizabeth	United Kingdom	The ship was in collision with Betty's Delight (United Kingdom) in the River Tyne and sank.

== 3 September ==
List of shipwrecks: 3 September 1834
Ship	State	Description
Britannia	United Kingdom	The ship sprang a leak and was abandoned in the Atlantic Ocean (45°10′N 23°00′W). She was on a voyage from Waterford to Quebec City, Lower Canada, British North America.
Castle Eden	United Kingdom	The ship was wrecked near Helsinki, Grand Duchy of Finland. She was on a voyage from Saint Petersburg, Russian Empire to Stockton on Tees, County Durham.
Simpson	United Kingdom	The ship struck a rock off "Cape Reay" and was abandoned. She was on a voyage from Southampton, Hampshire to Quebec City.

== 4 September ==
List of shipwrecks: 4 September 1834
Ship	State	Description
Jeans	United Kingdom	The ship was driven ashore and wrecked at Wick, Caithness. Her crew were rescued. She was on a voyage from Belfast, County Antrim to the Shetland Islands.

== 5 September ==
List of shipwrecks: 5 September 1834
Ship	State	Description
Sir Edward Codrington	United Kingdom	The ship foundered in the Atlantic Ocean. Her crew were rescued by Independence and Samson (both United Kingdom). Sir Edward Codrington was on a voyage from Liverpool, Lancashire to Quebec City, Lower Canada, British North America.
Two Sisters	United States	The ship was wrecked in Pimlico Sound. She was on a voyage from "Newburn" to Barbados.

== 6 September ==
List of shipwrecks: 6 September 1834
Ship	State	Description
Thalia	Russia	The ship was wrecked on the "Neckermans Ground". Her crew were rescued. She was on a voyage from Matanzas, Cuba to Saint Petersburg.

== 9 September ==
List of shipwrecks: 9 September 1834
Ship	State	Description
Leonhard	Russia	The ship was wrecked on the "Island of Runa". She was on a voyage from Liverpool, Lancashire, United Kingdom to Pärnu.

== 10 September ==
List of shipwrecks: 10 September 1834
Ship	State	Description
Eliza	United Kingdom	The ship was wrecked on "Nerwo Island". Her crew were rescued by St John (Russia). She was on a voyage from London to Kronstadt, Russian Empire.
Minerva	United Kingdom	The barque was wrecked on a coral reef 4 to 5 nautical miles (7.4 to 9.3 km) west north west of Luconia Island, Spanish East Indies. She was on a voyage from Sydney, New South Wales to Manila, Spanish East Indies.

== 11 September ==
List of shipwrecks: 11 September 1834
Ship	State	Description
Landsturm	Prussia	The ship was driven ashore on Ameland, Friesland, Netherlands. Her crew were rescued. She was on a voyage from Königsberg to Amsterdam, North Holland, Netherlands.
Sybelle	United Kingdom	The ship was wrecked at Pictou, Nova Scotia, British North America with the loss of all 316 passengers and all but six of her crew. She was on a voyage from Cromarty, to Quebec City, Lower Canada, British North America.

== 12 September ==
List of shipwrecks: 12 September 1834
Ship	State	Description
Intrepido	Portugal	The ship was wrecked on the St. Ignacio Bank. She was on a voyage from Lisbon to Bahia, Brazil.

== 13 September ==
List of shipwrecks: 13 September 1834
Ship	State	Description
Petina	Hamburg	The ship was wrecked on Texel, North Holland, Netherlands with the loss of all but one of her crew. She was on a voyage from Antwerp, Belgium to Hamburg.

== 14 September ==
List of shipwrecks: 14 September 1834
Ship	State	Description
Joseph and Ann	United Kingdom	The schooner was in collision with the brig Hotspur (United Kingdom) in the River Thames and sank. All on board were rescued. She was later refloated. Joseph and Ann was on a voyage from Youghal, County Cork to London.
Rosewarne	Denmark	The ship was wrecked on Skagen. She was on a voyage from Falmouth, Cornwall, United Kingdom to Riga, Russia.

== 15 September ==
List of shipwrecks: 15 September 1834
Ship	State	Description
Elizabeth	United Kingdom	The ship sprang a leak off the Falconera Islet, Greece and foundered. Her crew were rescued.
Margaret	United Kingdom	The ship was driven ashore and wrecked near Thisted, Denmark. Her crew were rescued.
Portuense	Portuguese Navy	The corvette was wrecked south of Bugio Island.
Triton	United Kingdom	The ship sprang a leak in the Atlantic Ocean. She was abandoned two days later. Her eighteen crew were rescued by Thomas Gelston (United Kingdom). Triton was on a voyage from Newry, County Antrim to Quebec City, Lower Canada, British North America.

== 16 September ==
List of shipwrecks: 16 September 1834
Ship	State	Description
Minerva	United Kingdom	The barque was wrecked on a reef off Cape Santiago, Spanish East Indies. She was on a voyage from Sydney, New South Wales to Manila, Spanish East Indies.

== 17 September ==
List of shipwrecks: 17 September 1834
Ship	State	Description
Mary	United Kingdom	The ship was abandoned in the Atlantic Ocean (50°N 37°W). Her ten surviving crew were rescued by Daniel O'Connell (United Kingdom). Mary was on a voyage from Quebec City, Lower Canada, British North America to Bristol, Gloucestershire.
Two Brothers	United Kingdom	The ship was abandoned in the Atlantic Ocean. Her crew were rescued by Mary Ann (United Kingdom). Two Brothers was on a voyage from Quebec City to Dublin.

== 19 September ==
List of shipwrecks: 19 September 1834
Ship	State	Description
Chebucto	United States	The ship was wrecked on George's Island, Massachusetts.

== 20 September ==
List of shipwrecks: 20 September 1834
Ship	State	Description
Antelope	(United Kingdom of Great Britain and Ireland) Dominica	The sloop was wrecked in a hurricane at Dominica with the loss of her captain.
Basque	France	The ship was driven ashore and wrecked in a hurricane at Martinique.
Catherine	(United Kingdom of Great Britain and Ireland) Barbados	The ship was driven ashore and wrecked in a hurricane at Dominica with the loss of seven lives.
Dolphin	(United Kingdom of Great Britain and Ireland)	Dominica: The ship was driven ashore and wrecked in a hurricane at Dominica.
Eagle	United Kingdom	The ship was abandoned in the Atlantic Ocean (45°N 37°W). All on board were rescued by Jackson (United Kingdom). Eagle was on a voyage from Cork to Saint John's, Newfoundland, British North America.
Jacques	France	The ship was driven ashore and wrecked in a hurricane at Martinique.
Union	France	The ship was driven ashore in a hurricane at Martinique.

== 21 September ==
List of shipwrecks: 21 September 1834
Ship	State	Description
Catherina Maria	Rostock	The ship was driven ashore and wrecked near Warnemünde, Rostock. She was on a voyage from Rostock to Saint Petersburg, Russia.

== 23 September ==
List of shipwrecks: 23 September 1834
Ship	State	Description
Active	Spain	The ship was lost off Gran Canaria, Canary Islands. She was on a voyage from São Miguel, Azores, Portugal to Lanzarote, Canaryu Islands.

== 26 September ==
List of shipwrecks: 26 September 1834
Ship	State	Description
Adelaide Packet	United Kingdom	The ship was driven ashore at Buenos Aires, Argentina.
Jane Brown	United Kingdom	The smack capsized at Londonderry. Her six crew were rescued.
Perfida	Brazil	The schooner was lost on the English Bank, in the Atlantic Ocean off the coast of Brazil.
Wave	United Kingdom	The brig was lost in the River Plate.

== 27 September ==
List of shipwrecks: 27 September 1834
Ship	State	Description
Carolina	United States	The full-rigged ship was lost in the River Plate.
Caroline	United States	The brig was lost in the River Plate.
David Moffat	United States	The brig was lost in the River Plate.
Earl of Eldon	United Kingdom	The ship was destroyed by fire 1,039 nautical miles (1,924 km) off Mauritius. All 45 people on board survived. She was on a voyage from Bombay, India to London.
Golcondria	United Kingdom	The brig was lost in the River Plate.
Scott	United Kingdom	The brig was lost in the River Plate.
Vesuvia	Kingdom of the Two Sicilies	The brig was lost in the River Plate.

== 30 September ==
List of shipwrecks: 30 September 1834
Ship	State	Description
Elizabeth	United Kingdom	The ship was abandoned off Madeira, Portugal. She was on a voyage from Sierra Leone to London.

== Unknown date ==
List of shipwrecks: Unknown date 1834
Ship	State	Description
Charles	France	The ship was wrecked on the coast of Senegal before 22 September.
Cumberland	(United Kingdom of Great Britain and Ireland) New South Wales	The cutter was wrecked in Mangles Bay with some loss of life. She was on a voyage from Sydney to Port Augusta.
Duke of Kent	United Kingdom	The brig was wrecked near George Town, Van Diemen's Land. Her crew survived. She was on a voyage from Mauritius to Hobart, Van Diemen's Land.
Ebelia	Netherlands	The ship foundered in the Baltic Sea. She was on a voyage from Rotterdam, South Holland to Saint Petersburg, Russia.
Fifeshire	United Kingdom	The barque was wrecked on the coast of Cochinchina before 29 April with the loss of six of her nine crew. She was on a voyage from Calcutta, India to Canton, China.
Happy Return	United States	The schooner was scuttled off Norfolk, Virginia.
Lord of the Isles	United Kingdom	The ship was wrecked in the Hooghly River before 20 September. She was on a voyage from Calcutta to London.
Marie Elisabeth	France	The ship was wrecked off "Fogliere".
New Orleans	United States	The ship was wrecked on the Sugar Loaf Reef. She was on a voyage from St. Ubes, Spain to Bath, Maine.
Republican	United States	Theschooner was run down and sunk by the steamship Pocahontas (United States). All on board were rescued. Republican was on a voyage from the Back River, Maryland to Baltimore, Ohio.
