= 2010 Galway county football team season =

Galway
2010 season
- Manager: Joe Kernan
- Stadium: Pearse Stadium, Salthill
- NFL D1: 5th
- All-Ireland SFC: Round 2 qualifier
- Connacht SFC: Semi-finalist

The following is a summary of Galway county football team's 2010 season.

Joe Kernan, the former All-Ireland Senior Football Championship (SFC) winning manager with Armagh, was appointed as Liam Sammon's successor as Galway manager.

== Competitions ==
=== National Football League Division 1 ===
The league campaign saw Galway come close to relegation. Galway won three and lost four league games. The team defeated Monaghan by a scoreline of 1–20 to 1–14, Tyrone by a scoreline of 1–15 to 0–14 and Dublin by a scoreline of 1–14 to 0–14, but lost to Mayo by a scoreline of 1–10 to 2–14, to Cork by a scoreline of 1–17 to 1–19, to Kerry by a scoreline of 1–9 to 2–16 and to Derry by a scoreline of 1–12 to 2–13.

Advanced to NFL final Automatic relegation to Division 2

Team	Pld	W	D	L	F	A	Diff	Pts
Mayo	7	6	0	1	9–86	5–78	+20	12
Cork	7	5	0	2	9–93	9–86	+7	10
Dublin	7	5	0	2	9–77	7–72	+11	10
Kerry	7	3	0	4	6–89	7–77	+9	6
Galway	7	3	0	4	7–97	8–104	−10	6
Monaghan	7	2	0	5	8–92	9–100	−11	4
Derry	7	2	0	5	5–85	8–87	−11	4
Tyrone	7	2	0	5	7–84	7–99	−15	4

- Cork were placed ahead of Dublin as they won the head-to-head match between the teams (20 March at Páirc Uí Rinn: 2–13 to 2–6).
- Kerry were placed ahead of Galway as they won the head-to-head match between the teams (14 March at Pearse Stadium: 2–16 to 1–9).
6 February 2010

Mayo	2–14 – 1–10	Galway
E Varley 1–1, M Ronaldson 0–4 (0-4f), T Mortimer 1–0, K McLoughlin, A Moran 0–2 each, P Gardiner, T Parsons, D Vaughan, A O'Shea, R McGarrity 0–1 each		M Meehan 1–3 (0-3f), N Joyce 0–3 (0-2f), S Armstrong, M Martin (0-2f) 0–2 each

McHale Park, Castlebar
Referee: Marty Duffy (Sligo)
14 February 2010

Galway	1–20 – 1–14	Monaghan
N Joyce 1–4 (0-3f), M Meehan 0–6 (0-5f), S Armstrong 0–5 (0-2f), F Breathnach 0–2, N Coleman, P Conroy, G Bradshaw 0–1 each		C McManus 0–5 (0-1f), P Finlay 0–4 (0-3f, 0–1 sideline), B McKenna 1–0, T Freeman 0–3 (0-1f), D Malone, V Corey 0–1 each

Pearse Stadium, Galway
Referee: D Fahy (Longford)
6 March 2010

Cork	1–19 – 1–17	Galway
P O'Neill 1–2, C O'Neill (0-3f), D O'Connor 0–4 each, P Kelly 0–3 (0-2f), P O'Flynn, D Goulding, 0–2 each, P Kerrigan, P Kissane 0–1		N Joyce 0–7 (0-5f), M Meehan 0–6 (0-3f), G Sice 1–0, S Armstrong (0–1 '45), C de Paor, D Reilly, D Cummins 0–1 each

Páirc Uí Rinn, Cork
Referee: M Condon (Waterford)
14 March 2010

Galway	1–9 – 2–16	Kerry
M Meehan 1–4 (0-3f, 0–1 '45), P Conroy 0–3, D Blake, F Breathnach 0–1		C Cooper 1–7 (0-5f), Declan O'Sullivan 1–1, D O'Callaghan, B Sheehan (0-1f) 0–3 each, A Maher, A O'Connell 0–1 each

Pearse Park
Referee: M Duffy (Sligo)
21 March 2010

Galway	1–15 – 0–14	Tyrone
M Clancy 1–3, E Concannon 0–4 (0-2f), J Bergin, G Sice 0–2 each, D Blake, P Conroy, C Bane, D Blake 0–1 each		M Penrose 0–8 (0-6f), C McCullagh, R Mellon, A Cassidy, S Cavanagh, T McGuigan (0-1f), C Cavanagh 0–1 each

Tuam
Referee: Marty Duffy (Sligo)
27 March 2010

Dublin	0–14 – 1–14	Galway
E Concannon 0–8 (0-5f), F Breathnach 1–0, N Joyce 0–3 (0-2f), G Sice 0–2, G Bradshaw 0–1		B Brogan 0–11 (0-7f), C O'Sullivan, K Bonner, C Keaney (0-1f) 0–1 each

Parnell Park
Referee: C Reilly (Meath)
11 April 2010

Galway	1–12 – 2–13	Derry
N Joyce 0–5 (0-4f), E Concannon 0–3 (0-3f), G O'Donnell 1–0, P Conroy 0–2, J Bergin, M Clancy 0–1 each		J Kielt 0-5f, D Mullan 1–2, SL McGoldrick 1–1, M Lynch 0–3 (2f), R Wilkinson, J Diver 0–1 each

=== Connacht Senior Football Championship ===
Galway narrowly avoided defeat to minnows New York in the 2010 Connacht SFC, emerging with a scoreline of 2–13 to 0-12. The Connacht SFC semi-final against Sligo showed little improvement, and at half-time, Galway trailed Sligo by a scoreline of 1–8 to 0–2. However, Galway managed to salvage an undeserved draw, with an Eoin Concannon goal and a Gareth Bradshaw point levelling the match at 1–10 apiece. Sligo defeated Galway in the replay, by a scoreline of 1–14 to 0-16, knocking Galway into the 2010 All-Ireland SFC qualifiers.

2 May 2010
Quarter-final

New York	0-12 – 2-13	Galway
D Doona 0-5, J Murtagh 0-4, B Reilly, A O'Connor, J Bell 0-1 each.	Report	P Joyce 1-6, N Joyce 0-4, C Bane 1-1, M Clancy, G Sice 0-1 each.

Gaelic Grounds, New York City
Referee: M. Condon (Waterford)
27 June 2010
Semi Final

Galway	1-10 - 1-10	Sligo
P Joyce 0-6, E Concannon 1-1, J Bergin, G Sice, G Bradshaw 0-1 each	Report	D Kelly 1-3, C McGee 0-3, A Costello, M Breheny, T Taylor, K Cawley 0-1 each

Pearse Stadium, Salthill
Attendance: 12,829
Referee: David Coldrick (Meath)
3 July 2010
Semi Final Replay

Sligo	1-14 - 0-16	Galway
D Kelly 1-2, M Breheny 0-4, A Marren 0-3, C McGee 0-2, K Cawley, A Costello, K Sweeney 0-1 each	Report	P Joyce 0-5, S Armstrong 0-4, M Clancy 0-2, G O'Donnell, J Bergin, M Meehan, E Concannon, P Conroy 0-1 each

Markievicz Park, Sligo
Referee: Maurice Deegan (Laois)

=== All-Ireland Senior Football Championship ===
In the 2010 All-Ireland SFC qualifier, Galway met Wexford in a Round 2 game at Pearse Stadium, a week after the Sligo defeat. A 1–11 to 0–13 defeat to Wexford knocked Galway out of the All-Ireland SFC, the team's second consecutive single-point All-Ireland SFC qualifier defeat. Kernan resigned as manager on 4 August 2010, after only one year in charge. Kernan said he felt his position as manager was being "undermined".

10 July 2010 Round 2	Galway	0-13 - 1-11	Wexford	Pearse Stadium, Salthill
	P Joyce 0-6, C Bane 0-4, G O'Donnell, M Clancy, S Armstrong 0-1 each	Report	C Lyng 1-6, A Flynn, E Bradley, C Morris, R Barry, M Forde 0-1 each	Referee: J. White (Donegal)
