= Life Style Sports =

Irish sports retailer

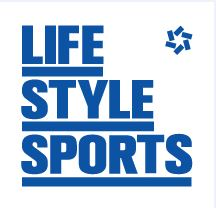
- Company type: Subsidiary
- Industry: Retail
- Founded: 1979; 47 years ago
- Headquarters: Mary Street, Dublin, Ireland
- Number of locations: 33 shops
- Key people: Mark Stafford (CEO)
- Products: Clothing; Sportswear; Accessories
- Owner: Stafford family
- Parent: Stafford Group
- Website: lifestylesports.com

Life Style Sports, officially Lifestyle Sports (Ireland) Limited is an Irish sports retailer, operating 33 outlets spread across the Republic of Ireland and Northern Ireland. They stock sporting goods and sport fashions.

== History ==
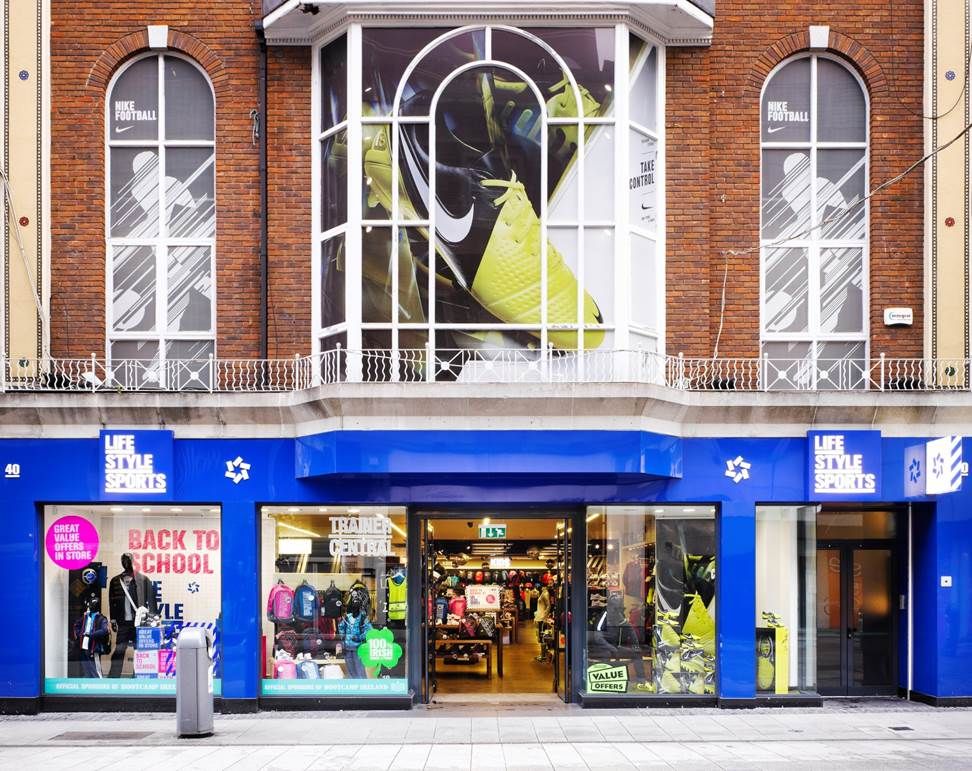
Life Style Sports in Mary Street, Dublin

Life Style Sports was established in 1979 in the Republic of Ireland by Quinnsworth, a subsidiary of Associated British Foods. In 1997 it was bought by Tesco PLC but was later spun off via a management buy-out of seven directors, led by MD Andrew Sharkey and venture capital firm, ACT.

In November 2005, it was acquired by Stafford Holdings – an Irish family-owned company who stated, "This latest acquisition is in line with its stated strategy of seeking acquisition opportunities in new sectors which offer strong growth potential, while maintaining a strong commitment to its current portfolio of businesses." In 2006, former Dunnes Stores senior director Eoin McGettigan was appointed CEO. Mark Stafford took up the role of chairman. In early 2009, Mark Stafford replaced McGettigan as CEO. He was joined by former Nike Ireland general manager Nigel Cowman as Finance Director, Dan Ryan from Penneys and Brown Thomas as Trading Director.

In September 2007 a new flagship shop opened in the Blanchardstown Centre, Dublin. This remained their largest shop, at 21,000 square feet (2,000 m^{2}). until July 2017, when the company's new flagship shop opened in The Capitol building St Patrick's Street in Cork.

In 2013, Life Style Sports became the official retail partner of Leinster Rugby, with a Life Style Sports shop located in Donnybrook Stadium and the Royal Dublin Society (RDS), home of Leinster Rugby. Life Style Sports is also the official retail partner of Munster Rugby.

=== Timeline of notable company events ===
- 1979 – Life Style Sports opens for business in the Republic of Ireland by Power Supermarkets Limited.
- 1997 – Life Style Sports expands to 32 shops nationwide.
- 2000 – Sienna Miller appears in the Life Style Sports Cinderella TV advert.
- 2004 – The Killers' single Mr. Brightside debuts on the Life Style Sports TV advert.
- 2005 – Company acquired by Stafford Holdings, an Irish family-owned company.
- 2009 – MTV presenter, Natasha Gilbert, stars in the first ever Life Style Sports Woman's Fitness Campaign "Your Life, Your Style, Your World”.
- 2011 – New Life Style Sports brand identity launched.
- 2012 – New shops on Mary Street and in Dundrum Town Centre, both in Dublin, are opened.
- 2012 – Life Style Sports relaunched its website as a full e-commerce site.
- 2017 - A new flagship shop was launched in Cork.

== See also ==
- Tesco Ireland
- Elverys Sports
- JD Sports
