= Johnny Duane =

Irish Gaelic footballer from Galway

Personal information
- Born: 18 October 1991 (age 35) Galway, Ireland
- Height: 1.83 m (6 ft 0 in)

Sport
- Sport: Gaelic football
- Position: Centre Back
Club
- Years: Club
- 2008–: St James'
Club titles
- Galway titles: 1
- Connacht titles: 1
Inter-county
- Years: County
- 2011–2015, 2017–2021 2016: Galway; New York
Inter-county titles
- Connacht titles: 1
- NFL: 1

Johnny Duane (born 18 October 1991) is an Irish Gaelic football player from Galway. Duane plays club football for St James' and inter-county football for Galway.

Duane was a key part of Galway's All-Ireland Under-21 Football Championship win in 2011.

He made his senior debut in 2011 against Mayo in a Connacht semi-final, which Galway lost thus sending them to the qualifiers.

== Honours ==
Galway

- Connacht Under-21 Football Championship (1): 2011
- All-Ireland Under-21 Football Championship (1): 2011
- Connacht Senior Football Championship (1): 2018
