= Fine Fare =

UK supermarket chain, 1951–1988

Fine Fare (Holdings) Ltd
- Type: Private company, subsidiary
- Industry: Retail
- Founded: 1951; 75 years ago
- Defunct: 1988; 38 years ago
- Fate: Sold and rebranded to Gateway
- Successor: The Dee Corporation
- Headquarters: Welwyn Garden City, United Kingdom
- Key people: Garfield Weston; James Gulliver (chairman 1967–1972); Garry Weston
- Parent: Howardsgate Trust (1951–1954); Allied Bakeries via subsidiary Howardsgate Holdings (1954-1963); Dicoa (1963-1967); Associated British Foods (1967–1986); Dee Corporation (1986–1988)
- Subsidiaries: Melias, Shoppers Paradise

Fine Fare was a chain of supermarkets which operated in the United Kingdom from 1951 until 1988. During the 1960s the company was the largest operator of supermarkets in Europe. Their Yellow Pack budget own-label range, introduced in 1980, was the first own brand basic range to be introduced in the UK. In 1983, it was the first British supermarket to sell organic food.

The business for most of its existence was owned by companies controlled by Garfield Weston and his family. In 1986 it was sold to the Dee Corporation, operators of Gateway Foodmarkets. Following this, the stores were closed or rebranded, and by late 1988 the Fine Fare name had been phased out.

== History ==
=== Early history ===
In 1921, a year after Welwyn Garden City had been founded, Welwyn Stores opened there as an all-encompassing department store and social hub owned by the Welwyn Garden City Company, the business formed by Ebenezer Howard, the founder of the garden city movement. The business would open further branches in Hertfordshire selling groceries. Welwyn Garden City Company refused to allow any other retailer in the new town until 1936, when the Co-op were allowed to open a branch. The business opened the newly purpose-built Welwyn Department Store in 1939 to replace the former Welwyn Stores. In 1948, Welwyn Garden City Company transferred the development of the town to the Welwyn Garden City Development Corporation under the New Towns Act 1946, with the remaining parts of the business transferring to the Howardsgate Trust in 1951. Fine Fare was opened as a single supermarket in 1951, as an offshoot of the Welwyn Department Store.

=== Arrival of Weston ===
In December 1954, Garfield Weston's Allied Bakeries business, the forerunner of Associated British Foods, purchased from Howardsgate Trust the Fine Fare Supermarket, the Welwyn Store grocery branches and the bakery business owned by the Trust. In 1955, Allied Bakeries entered an agreement with Cooper & Co, a Scottish grocery retailer, purchasing shares in the business but with Coopers maintaining its management, while in the same year they also added the North London department store business of B.B. Evans, purchasing the business from Littlewoods through its retail subsidiary Howardsgate Holdings. They also completed the purchase of the Welwyn Department Store (and its subsidiary, the ladies' fashion store Cresta) from the Howardsgate Trust, and added the south east grocery multiple, Forrest Stores. By 1958, Howardsgate Holdings had added the 200+ stores of Joseph Burton & Sons to the business, as well as 100 stores of The London & Newcastle Tea Company and the Midlands & South West based Fearis Group, and the 30 grocery stores of Clarks in South East London. Joseph Burton & Co had started as a greengrocer in Nottingham during 1858 expanded rapidly and was incorporated and listed on the London Stock Exchange in 1900. The business operated under various names including the India & China Tea Stores; Valentine Stores; Shaw Brothers; Leckeby's; Swansons and J L Allcock. At the time, Howardsgate controlled over 600 stores, with Fine Fare accounting for 50+ grocery stores and 18 supermarkets.

In January 1959, the company won a court case against Brighton Corporation, which had insisted that its outlets closed on Wednesday afternoons under the Shops Act 1950. In the same year, the company disposed of the North London department store B.B.Evans to the Harrow Stores group, and the Cresta ladies fashion stores to Debenhams. In 1959, multiple grocery retailers like Fine Fare only had 25% of the whole market. The company went on an expansion plan in the late 50s and early 60s, designed by their own in-house architect team led by Bryan Russel Archer and by 1962 had opened 236 supermarkets across the Fine Fare, Coopers and Burton brands, 30% of the total number of British supermarket stores, with a plan to open further supermarkets. In 1960, Garfield Weston brought in 500 Canadian supermarket clerks to train the management as the business struggled to find the required business leaders.

=== 1960s ===
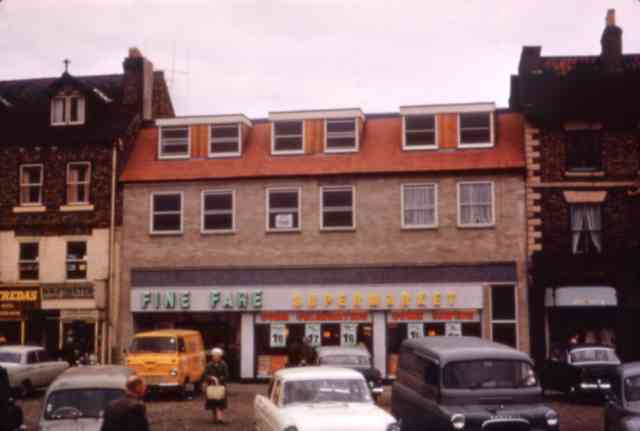
A Fine Fare store in Thirsk, 1968

In 1963, with the company struggling with its rapid expansion and not having enough junior managers, Garfield Weston stopped the supermarket building plan, with 46 of the stores not opened being sold or leased to rivals, like Tesco. Soon after it was reported that business had made a net loss of $3.7 million to the year ending 30 March 1963, with many criticising the company for what they saw as poor marketing. In June 1963, Associated British Foods sold 51% of Howardsgate Holdings to DICOA, a holding company owned by Weston's principal Canadian investment business, Wittington Investments. The deal saw DICOA (Diversified Companies of America) pay $11.7 million for the stake plus a further $17 million advance to cover some of Fine Fare's loans. As part of the deal, George Metcalfe, the boss of Weston's Canadian grocery chain Loblaws joined as chair of Howardsgate Holdings. The company at the time had 275 supermarkets and 375 grocery stores operating under such names as John Shental; Albert Hausen; Fred Brown; Boyce Adams and Arthur Davy & Sons. Welwyn Department Store was not part of the sale of Howardsgate Holdings and was transferred directly to Associated British Foods. The DICOA deal took the huge losses off Associated British Foods consolidated balance sheet.

Soon after joining, Metcalf introduced Sperry & Hutchinson Pink Saving Stamps, which were already given out at Loblaws in Canada, and stated he would restart the supermarket rebuilding programme with the aim to open 1,000 supermarkets. However Sainsbury's joined forces with other grocery firms to form the Distributive Trades Alliance. In protest at the issuing of the stamps, the alliance members stopped stocking Associated British Foods Sunblest bread brand, and by 1964 Fine Fare cancelled their contract with Sperry & Hutchinson, though Cooper stores in Scotland continued. By 1965, the management team were still trying to turn the business around, opening the largest supermarket in England, with some stores being turned into a discount store Busy B, while they realised that 1 in 10 were uneconomical and would need to be remodelled and open under new names. Another plan was to turn the company into three focused brand, Cooper for the top end of the market, Fine Fare as the middle market store and Busy B for the discount market. Many of the Canadian management team resigned that summer as the strain took its toll as they struggled to turn the business around. The company, the largest supermarket chain in Europe at the time, made a pre-tax profit of just £85,000 in 1965, while rival Tesco had made £2.5 million. Garfield Weston replaced these with British management, with James Gulliver appointed as Chief Executive. Gulliver, 35, had worked as a consultant for Associated British Foods construction subsidiary and impressed Weston enough to offer him the management role at Fine Fare.

In 1966, George Weston Limited, another Weston company, bought DICOA, clearing the $18.7m debt that had occurred when DICOA had purchased Fine Fare. The company name was changed from Howardsgate Holdings to Fine Fare (Holdings) Ltd. Gulliver meanwhile was introducing a scheme called Management by Objective, splitting the central management structure into four regional groups, creating own brand products and revising operating processes from warehousing to shelf stocking. This included a new computerised distribution centre in Washington at the cost of £400,000 which opened in 1968. In 1967, Associated British Foods repurchased 31% of the shares owned by DICOA in Fine Fare for $23,376,000, adding to the 49% it still owned. Gulliver's changes was seeing improvements, and in 1967 he was made chairman of Fine Fare. The company continued to grow, purchasing the 28 store East Anglian chain of Elmo for £1m from South African retailer O.K. Bazaars, and opening new supermarkets like Preston in the St. John's Shopping Centre, while Cooper's was rebranded under the trading name of Cooper's Fine Fare. Gulliver also opened Fine Ware, a non food chain of stores selling general merchandise, with Fine Ware gondolas appearing in Fine Fare stores. The remaining 20% of Fine Fare (Holdings) were purchased from George Weston in 1968 for $2,243,000 by Associated British Foods, making it a wholly owned subsidiary for the first time since 1963. In the same year, Fine Fare purchased the northern based grocery business of Great Universal Stores, William Cusson, with its supermarket subsidiary Carline, who operated 40 supermarkets and the high end grocery chain Hodgson & Hepworth in Doncaster. Under Gulliver's reorganisation Fine Fare's profit before tax in 1968 had grown to £2.7m. During 1968, the company introduced new products, including plants, a first for a British supermarkets which was not followed by its rivals until two years later, and its own brand wines and spirits. The company also moved into the off-licence trade, with 21 stores opened by 1969. By 1969, market share in the British grocery trade for supermarkets had grown to 41%. The company announced that they would be spending £400,000 on updating their tills in preparation of decimalisation. Fine Fare's profits in the same year continued to grow to £4.5m, and although they had greatly improved since 1965 (by over 5000%), they were still behind Tesco who had posted a profit of £10m.

=== 1970s and 1980s ===
At the beginning of the 1970s, Fine Fare was the fourth largest UK supermarket chain in terms of market share. The business continued to grow by buying rival grocery chains, purchasing the 200 strong Waterworth business based in Lancashire. The company were still operating a variety of brands including Elmos, Carlines, Forrest Stores, Blower Bros., Scott's Fine Fare and Chas H. Sheen. The company opened one of Britain's biggest supermarkets in Aberdeen, and was not sure what name to call it, but named it superstore after the local bus company put it as the destination on the front of the bus. Fine Fare's parent company, Associated British Foods, had in 1967 had purchased a controlling share holding in the grocery firm Melias, who also operated Merlin Supermarkets, and in 1970 agreed to share costs amongst both companies and allow the Fine Fare brand to be used on Melias supermarkets. The connection between Fine Fare and Melias grew further in 1971, when James Gulliver became chairman of the business after the retirement of Mr J C Sanderson. Associated British Foods would buy the remaining shares in Melias in 1972, merging the business into Fine Fare.

In 1972, Gulliver was named Britain's Young Businessman of the Year but left the company to set up his own business. Seven years after Gulliver's appointment as chairman, the turnover had grown from £35 million to £200 million. The company continued to grow, purchasing grocery firm City Stores, who had recently opened the 58,000 sq. foot Shoppers Paradise hypermarket in Bedworth. Fine Fare announced that they would be the third UK retailer to withdraw from the full price records market in 1973, and that they planned to open 8 new superstores. The company announced a profit of £6m in 1973, with further growth to £7.4m a year later. In 1975, the company launched Shoppers Paradise as the company's discount chain, offering a small range of bare necessities, opening them in competitive areas or in smaller former Fine Fare locations. They also announced a £10m building program over the next 12 months. and had moved into the burgeoning freezer centre market, having opened four stores. In 1976, Fine Fare bought 47 stores of the East Anglian-based Downsway supermarket chain, which was owned by the Vestey family business, Union International Group. Another chain purchased was Mercury Market, a north west-based chain started by the De Rooy family

By 1977, Fine Fare operated 460 supermarkets and a further 372 stores. In the same year, before Tesco launched their Checkout campaign, Fine Fare were cheaper than Tesco on branded products, although they were dearer on own-brand goods. In 1978 the expansion of the discount centres under the Shoppers Paradise and Elmo brands continued, and were opening further superstores, with Blackpool, built on the site of the former North Station, opening in 1979. Fine Fare however had dropped behind in the cheapest supermarket race, with Asda, Tesco, Sainsbury's, Key Markets and International being cheaper in branded and own brands by 1979. By 1980, the business was still in fourth place in market share, though Asda now had a larger share than Fine Fare, and Sainsbury's and Tesco's market share had nearly doubled since 1970. To improve their competitiveness in the low price wars, Fine Fare launched Yellow Pack, Britain's supermarket first basic range, which followed the idea originated by Carrefour in 1976. The launch may have helped Fine Fare reach 25% of all sales being own brand in the same year, but they were still behind Sainsbury's and Waitrose who were above 50% and 40% in own-brand sales respectively. In addition to Yellow Pack, the company introduced the Fine Fare Guarantee, a price guarantee that stated Fine Fare would offer the best price week in, week out, and if the customer could prove that an item was cheaper elsewhere they would be given a refund. The business grew further in 1980 by the purchase of 57 Pricerite stores in the south of England from owner BAT adding them to their 131 Shoppers Paradise chain, and started to experiment with the use of bar code scanners at tills. In November 1980, Fine Fare opened their largest store yet, the Birchwood Hypermarket; however, they sold their 16 freezer centres to Bejam. The company made a pre-tax profit of £17.6m for 1980–81.

The business moved into the burgeoning DIY industry with their Fix'n'Fit counters in superstores, before opening their own standalone stores. The business was sold to WHSmith Do It All in 1986. By 1982, the business had rebranded under the three umbrella brands of Fine Fare, for superstores and supermarkets, Shoppers Paradise, for minimum lines discount stores and Melias, for convenience stores. During 1982 and 1983, Fine Fare announced plans to open 17 new stores. Fine Fare became Britain's first supermarket to sell organic foods when they introduced them to their stores in 1983. The company made a pre-tax profit of £35.3m in 1984–85, more than double made at the start of the decade, and by 1985 they were operating 437 stores including 40 superstores and 155 Shoppers Paradise. The company had continued to roll out the use of bar code scanning laser pen readers to stores, including all Shoppers Paradise shops so they could increase product lines from 650 to 1,250.

=== Associated British Foods exit, Dee arrive ===
Although Fine Fare spent money on closing down 32 older stores and opening a further 13 new stores, profits had grown by 25%, and the chain was the fastest growing business within Associated British Foods, with Garry Weston announcing a further 15 new stores would be opened during 1986. However, investors were speculating that the business would be sold, with James Gulliver's Argyll group being mentioned as a potential purchaser. The rumours were true, as Weston had decided that to try and compete with giants Tesco and Sainsbury's was not practical. However Gulliver did not make a bid, and two interested bidders came to the fore. David Smith, an accountancy consultant who had worked for Arthur Young, had joined forces with former Asda boss John Fletcher to make a bid, while a rival bid came from the Dee Corporation, operators of Gateway Foodmarkets. In June 1986, Associated British Foods sold the company to The Dee Corporation in a deal worth £668 million, that was paid in a mixture of cash and a £308 million issue of new Dee shares. All Dee Corporation's newly acquired stores were then either rebranded as Gateway Foodmarkets or closed, meaning the Fine Fare name (including Shoppers Paradise and Melias) disappeared by the end of 1988.

== Advertising and sponsorship ==
In 1968, Garland Compton replaced Fine Fare's previous agency, G S Gerrard, with a £250,000 contract. Their first advertisement was a customer recommendation piece with the tag line You will always find fairness at Fine Fare.The tagline was replaced soon after to Fine Fare Care, but due to a price error in an advert, Garland Compton had to reimburse Fine Fare and would need to repitch for the business which they retained. Another tag line used during this time was Where you can be fair to your family, and your purse. From 1973, Fine Fare used the advertising agency Collett Dickenson Pearce after they signed an £850,000 contract, replacing their previous advertising agent Garland Compton. Fine Fare changed its advertising agency again in 1980, awarding Young & Rubicom London a £2m contract. Young & Rubicom London's advertising campaign for the launch of Fine Fare's new Birchwood Hypermarket received second prize in the IPA Effectiveness Awards. In 1985, Fine Fare increased its annual advertising spend by 30% to £4.3m, after spending around £3.3m to £3.5m in the three years previously.

Fine Fare sponsored the Scottish Football League for three years from the season of 1985–86 (beginning August 1985) to the season of 1987–88 (which ended in May 1988, around the same time that the last Fine Fare stores closed). The business also advertised on television, with some of the commercials fronted by the actor Gordon Jackson. A Fine Fare Yellow Pack advert by the advertising agency Collett Dickenson Pearce won a Bronze Arrow at the British Television Awards.

== Fine Fare operating names and companies ==
Below is a list of names and companies that Howardsgate Holdings/ Fine Fare operated under or purchased from 1951 to its sale to the Dee Corporation in 1986.

- Boyce Adams
- J L Allcock (via purchase of Joseph Burton & Sons)
- Blower Bros
- Fred Brown
- Joseph Burton & Sons
- Busy B
- Carline
- Clarks
- City Stores
- Cooper's & Co
- Cresta (sold to Debenhams)
- William Cusson
- Arthur Davy & Sons
- Elmo
- B.B. Evans (sold to Harrow Stores)
- Fearis Group
- Fine Fare
- Fine Fare Freezer Centres (sold to Bejam)
- Fine Ware
- Fix'n'Fit (sold to WH Smith Do It All)
- Forrest Stores
- Albert Hausen
- Hodgson & Hepworth
- India & China Tea Stores (via purchase of Joseph Burton & Sons)
- Leckeby's (via purchase of Joseph Burton & Sons)
- London and Newcastle Tea Company
- Mercury Market
- Melias
- Scott's Fine Fare
- Shaw Brothers (via purchase of Joseph Burton & Sons)
- Chas H. Sheen
- John Shental
- Shoppers Paradise
- Swansons (via purchase of Joseph Burton & Sons)
- Valentine Stores (via purchase of Joseph Burton & Sons)
- Waterworth
- Welwyn Stores

== Depots ==
- Welwyn Garden City (Hertfordshire)
- East Kilbride (Lanarkshire)
- Washington (Tyne & Wear) Opened 1968
- Cheadle Hulme (Stockport)
- Hucknall (Nottinghamshire)
- Tuffley (Gloucester)
- Aylesford (Kent)
- Weedon (Northampton)
- Stevenage (Hertfordshire)
- Farnborough (Hampshire)
- Bromsgrove (Worcestershire) Opened 1979.

== In popular culture ==
Fine Fare is mentioned in the song Aisle of Plenty from the album Selling England by the Pound by the progressive rock band, Genesis. It was also the subject of a song by the punk band Toy Dolls called Nowt Can Compare to Sunderland Fine Fare from their fourth album Bare Faced Cheek.
