= London and Newcastle Tea Company =

Established in 1874, the London and Newcastle Tea Company's offices were in Charlotte Square, Newcastle upon Tyne, England. Early branches were in New Bridge Street, Sandhill, Scotswood Road, Shields Road, Westgate Road and Clayton Street but the firm later expanded to outlying parts of the city, and down throughout County Durham. It went out of business between 1959 and 1964.

According to James B. Jefferys, the London and Newcastle Tea Company was one of the first five firms in Britain in the grocery and provisions trade to operate in a multiple branch scale. In 1875, it ran between 10 and 20 branches; in 1880, it was the second biggest grocery chain in Britain, with between 40 and 50 branches, just ahead of Thomas Lipton's rapidly expanding empire.

The firm had a loyalty scheme in operation as early as 1875. The network of grocers, which sold the company's tea, gave a brass check with each purchase. Customers were invited to save the checks until they had acquired enough to claim a prize such as a toy, an item of crockery or a household gadget. The checks are now collector's items. By 1928, the shop at 212 Chillingham Road, Heaton, had been acquired by the London and Newcastle Tea Company. The London and Newcastle Tea company (L&N Stores) was by 1958 part of Garfield Weston's Associated British Foods retail group, Howardsgate Holdings, which included the Fine Fare supermarket chain. General Manager was Henry Tushingham. First supermarkets in north east were in Cockerton, Darlington and Northgate Darlington, then under the L&N supervision of Cecil Bell, area manager. Quickly the management was transferred to the new Fine Fare team under W. De Smidd - Director, North East area manager M.G. Bastiani with George Colley (supervisor) working from York. The 7600 sq ft Northgate store was managed by Alan Tushingham, son of the General manager (L&N) and its opening in 1962 caused a complete blockage of the main Northgate thoroughfare, when Frankie Vaughan was chosen to officially open the store. Two Canadian managers were brought over to assist, Lennie Hanna and Nelson Sianchuck. The opening was a fiasco with the celebrity retreating to the safety of the managers office, whilst the police were dealing with the vast crowds trying to enter the store to get a glimpse of the celebrity. A complete 25 ft gondola shelf fitting holding many products including jam, was knocked over, and the resultant staining of the new floor was apparent months after. The police stopped people leaving the store, and rear and emergency doors were used to ease crowding.

The company used the Brook Bond Tea Chimps, and the Dagenham Girl Pipers to open future stores (as can be seen in the film version of Keith Waterhouse, and Willis Hall's Billy Liar, which featured a Fine Fare a store opening in the story line), As new Fine Fare stores were opened, L&N Stores were gradually closed around 1964.
