= Quinnsworth =

Irish supermarket chain

- Type: Limited company
- Industry: Retailing
- Founded: 1966; 60 years ago
- Founder: Pat Quinn
- Defunct: 2001
- Fate: Acquired by Tesco (1997)
- Successor: Tesco Ireland
- Headquarters: Dublin, Ireland
- Number of locations: 88 supermarkets
- Area served: Ireland
- Key people: Maurice Pratt (Chief Executive)
- Products: Grocery
- Parent: Power Supermarkets Ltd

Quinnsworth was a supermarket chain that operated in Ireland from 1966 to 2001. During its time in operation, it grew to be one of Ireland's leading retailers, with approximately one quarter of the grocery market in the Republic of Ireland, and some 88 supermarkets across the island of Ireland, including its Crazy Prices brand operated at some of its larger outlets. It was acquired by UK chain Tesco in 1997, with its supermarkets being gradually rebranded as Tesco Ireland over the following four years.

== Formation and development ==
Quinnsworth was founded by Leitrim-born Pat Quinn. Quinn had worked as General Manager of the H Williams supermarket chain and had proposed that the chain open a supermarket in the Stillorgan Shopping Centre. H Williams rejected the proposal, and Quinn decided to open a supermarket there himself in December 1966, which became the first shop in the Quinnsworth chain. By 1971, Quinnsworth had grown to six shops and had a turnover of IR£6 million. It opened its first supermarket outside of Dublin at Douglas, Cork in December 1971.

In 1972, the business, which by then had seven supermarkets (in Ballymun, Dundrum, Rathfarnham, Douglas, Wilton, Galway and Shannon), was acquired by Power Supermarkets Ltd, which in turn was owned by the Weston family and controlled the rival chain, Power's Supermarkets. The Power's supermarkets were rebranded under the Quinnsworth name.

== Acquisitions ==
During the 1970s, the company was acquired by Associated British Foods plc. During that period, it used the slogan "Let's get it all together at Quinnsworth". It was one of the leading supermarket chains in Ireland in terms of turnover, and by 1978, it had 41 outlets, rising to 43 outlets in 1979. It acquired rival chain Five Star, which had 26 outlets, from Tullamore-based Williams Group for IR£5 million in 1979. (Note: Five Star had supermarkets at 22 Upper Drumcondra Road in Dublin 9, St Agnes Road in Crumlin, Northside Shopping Centre in Coolock, 296-300 Ballyfermot Road in Ballyfermot, 181 Howth Road in Killester, Stillorgan Shopping Centre in Stillorgan, Seven Towers Shopping Centre in Ballymun, 5-11 Main Street, Blackrock in Dublin, 105-106 Main Street in Bray, 54-54A Patrick Street in Cork, Clashduv in Cork, 36-37 Oliver Plunkett Street in Cork, 13 Oliver Plunkett Street in Mullingar, O'Connell Street in Sligo, Roxboro Shopping Centre in Limerick, Upper Rathmines Road in Rathmines and Upper Baggot Street in Dublin.)

By 1981, following the acquisition of Five Star, Quinnsworth had 71 supermarkets. That same year, the business announced that it intended to close 7 of its 31 supermarkets in Dublin (in Baggot Street, Blackrock, Dolphin's Barn, Finglas, Killester, Ranelagh and Rosemount). The Irish Association of Distributive Trades criticised this development as "clear proof that the supermarket giants have now achieved monopolistic control of the Dublin grocery market" and that the takeover of Five Star by Quinnsworth should not have been permitted. Quinnsworth responded by citing size limitations and a modernisation programme, and countered that it was carrying out a major expansion of its Rathfarnham supermarket that year, and that it intended to open a shopping centre in Artane, to extend its Ennis and Wexford shops, and to open new supermarkets in Tullamore and Navan in 1982. It contended that it had bigger and better outlets near the closing shops, including on Upper Baggot Street, where the acquired Five Star supermarket was located almost directly opposite the existing Quinnsworth outlet.

== Branding and promotion ==
In the early 1980s, the business introduced the Crazy Prices brand, which had previously been used only in Northern Ireland, to the Republic of Ireland. The Crazy Prices brand was used on some of its larger outlets. These outlets were known for their low prices. Crazy Prices was one of the first retailers in Ireland to introduce late night opening (until 9pm) on Wednesdays, dubbing this night "Crazy Night" and running special in-store promotions. Until the mid-1990s, most Irish retailers only opened late one night a week, usually Thursday (in Dublin city) or Friday. KVI branding was Crazy Prices equivalent to the Quinnsworth Yellow pack. It came in blue red and white striped packaging. K.V.I. stood for "Keen Value Item" and was the equivalent of the previous Quinnsworth Yellow Pack, except perhaps even further downmarket.

One of Quinnsworth's "most memorable" developments was the addition of the phrase Yellow Pack to the retailing lexicon. Towards the end of Quinnsworth's life, Yellow Pack was replaced by K.V.I. label as the low-cost generic grocery brand, and a high quality generic line called Premium Choice modeled after Loblaws President's Choice (Loblaws being owned by another branch of the Weston family). Quinnsworth was also remembered for its advertising campaigns featuring its marketing director (and later chief executive) Maurice Pratt, who would personally introduce new product promotions, ending each advert with the company slogan, "That's Real Value".

Quinnsworth grew to gain a 25% share of the Irish grocery market by the 1990s.

== Sale ==
In 1996, Quinnsworth announced that it had taken a large unit in the new Golden Island Shopping Centre, which was due to open in late 1997. It was anticipated that its existing supermarket in the ageing Athlone Shopping Centre would be rebranded as Crazy Prices.

On 20 March 1997, it was announced that Quinnsworth, including its Crazy Prices outlets, had been acquired by the UK supermarket company, Tesco, for IR£630 million. By then, the business had 57 Quinnsworth-branded supermarkets, and 31 branded as Crazy Prices (21 in the Republic of Ireland and 10 in Northern Ireland). The acquisition also included Stewart's Supermarkets in Northern Ireland. The first Tesco-branded supermarket was the unit acquired by Quinnsworth in the Golden Island Shopping Centre the previous year, which opened as Tesco rather than Quinnsworth in October 1997. All shops were rebranded over the following years, with the rebranding process almost completed by April 2001.
