= John Irving Bentley =

Incinerated physician (1874 – 1966)

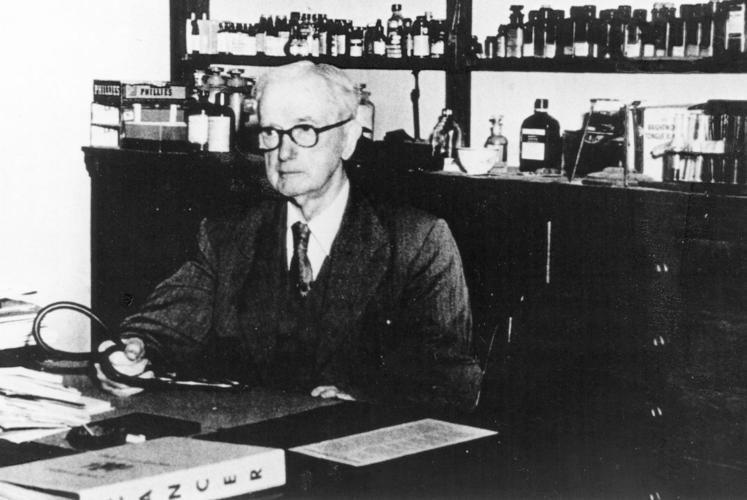
- Born: April 15, 1874; Ludlow, Vermont
- Died: December 5, 1966 (aged 92); Coudersport, Pennsylvania
- Cause of death: Burning; spontaneous human combustion (speculated)
- Occupation: Physician
- Known for: Unusual death

John Irving Bentley (15 April 1874 – 5 December 1966) was a physician who burned to death at the age of 92 in the bathroom of his house in Coudersport, Pennsylvania. His death is sometimes speculated to have been caused by spontaneous human combustion.

== Discovery of Bentley's remains ==
Bentley was last seen alive 4 December 1966, when friends visiting his home wished him good night at about 9 p.m. The following morning, meter reader Don Gosnell let himself into Bentley's house, as he had permission to do due to Bentley's infirmity, and went to the basement to check the meter. While in the basement, Gosnell noticed a strange smell and a light blue smoke. He explained the smoke to be "somewhat sweet, like starting up a new oil-burning central heating system". On the ground was a neat pile of ash, about 35 centimetres (14 in) in height. The floor underneath the ash was unmarked. Had he looked up, he would have seen a hole about a foot long square in the floorboards above. Intrigued, he went upstairs to investigate. The bedroom was smoky, and, in the bathroom, he found Bentley's cremated remains.

All that was left of Bentley was the lower half of his right leg with the slipper still on it. The rest of his body had been reduced to a pile of ashes in the basement below. His walker lay across the hole in the floor generated by the fire. The rubber tips on it were still intact and the nearby bathtub was barely scorched. Gosnell ran from the building to get help. He reached the gas company office screaming "Doctor Bentley's burned up!" to his colleagues. They later stated that he looked as white as a sheet.

== Theories ==
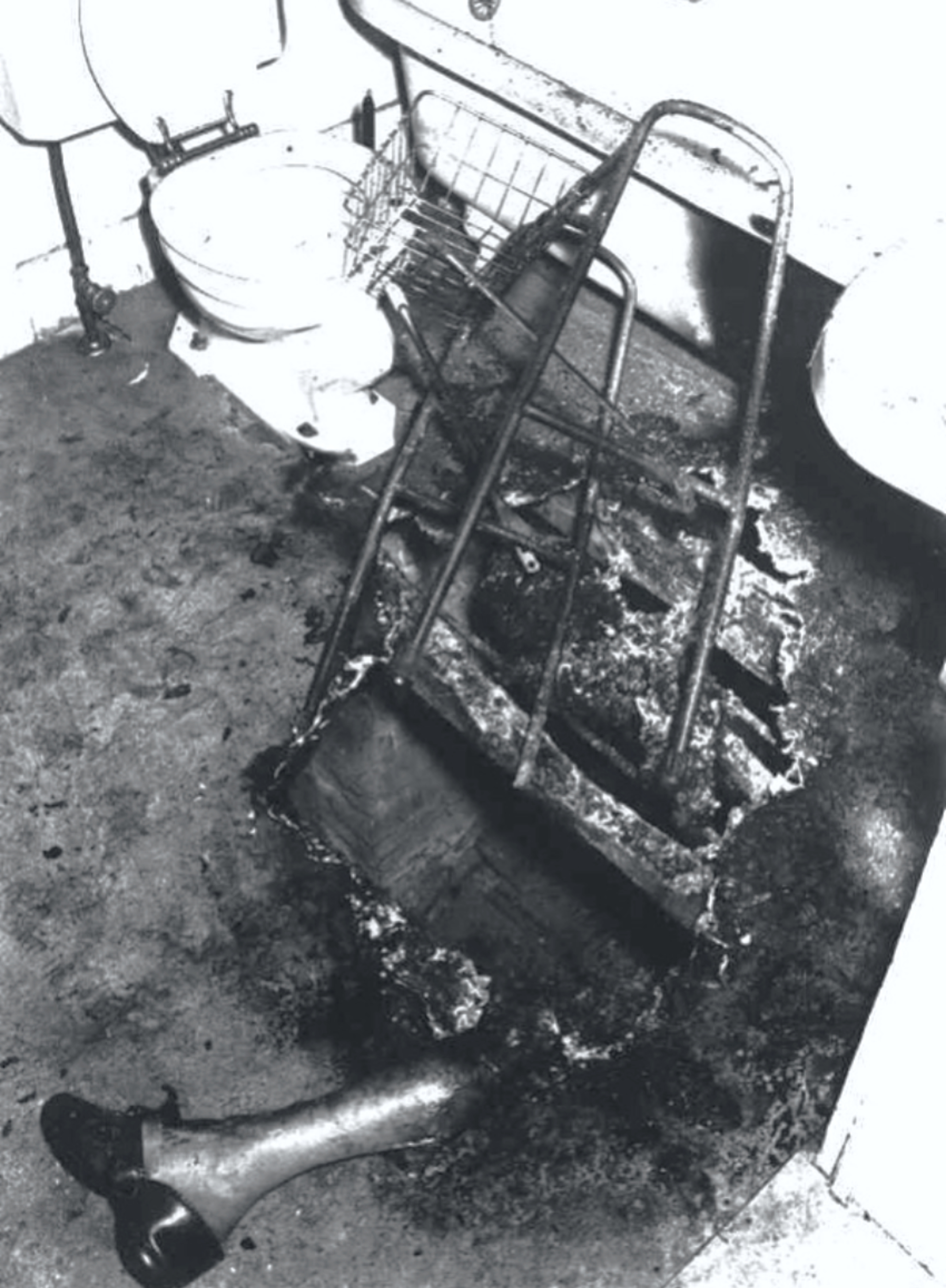
Bentley's remains as they were discovered in the bathroom.

The first theory put forward was that Bentley had set himself on fire with his pipe, but his pipe was still on its stand by the bed in the next room. Perplexed, the coroner could only record a verdict of "death by asphyxiation and 90 percent burning of the body."

Joe Nickell, in his book Secrets of the Supernatural, gives an account of this event he got from Larry E. Arnold's article "The Flaming Fate of Dr. John Irving Bentley," printed in the Pursuit of Fall 1976. Nickell mentions that the hole in the bathroom floor measured 2½ feet by 4 feet, and details the remains as being Bentley's lower leg burned off at the knee.

Nickell mentions that Bentley's robe was found smoldering in the bathtub next to the hole, and that the broken remains of "what was apparently a water pitcher" were found in the toilet; he adds that the doctor had dropped hot ashes from his pipe onto his clothing previously (which "were dotted with burn spots from previous incidents"), and that he kept wooden matches in his pockets which could transform a small ember into a blazing flame.

Nickell believes that Bentley woke up to find his clothes on fire, walked to the bathroom, and passed out before he could extinguish the flames. Then, he suggests that the burning clothes ignited the flammable linoleum floor, and cool air drawn from the basement in what is known as "the stack effect" kept the fire burning hotly.

== See also ==
- Spontaneous human combustion
