= Death of Mary Reeser =

American woman who died by burning (1884–1951)

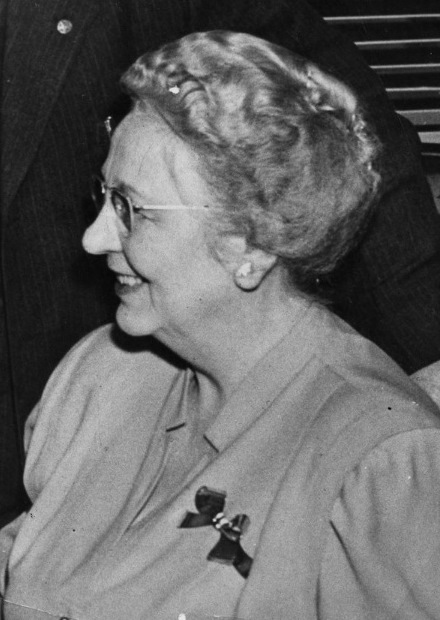
- Only known photo of Reeser, taken in 1947
- Born: Mary Hardy; March 8, 1884; Columbia, Pennsylvania, US
- Died: July 2, 1951 (aged 67); St. Petersburg, Florida, US
- Known for: Mysterious immolation
- Children: 1

Mary Hardy Reeser (March 8, 1884 – July 2, 1951) of St. Petersburg, Florida, was a woman whose unusual death by burning was surrounded by mystery, and even controversially reported at the time to be a case of spontaneous human combustion. She was often referred to as the "cinder lady" in newspaper accounts of the day.

== Death ==
At roughly 8 a.m. on July 2, 1951, Reeser's landlady, Pansy Carpenter, arrived at Reeser's apartment at 1200 Cherry St. NE, St. Petersburg, Florida, with a telegram. Trying the door, she found the metal doorknob to be uncomfortably warm to the touch and called the police. Reeser's remains, which were largely ashes, were found among the remnants of a chair in which she had been sitting.

=== Details ===
All that remained of Reeser, who contemporaneously became known as the "cinder lady", were part of her left foot (that was wearing a slipper), her backbone, and her skull. Plastic household objects at a distance from the seat of the fire were softened and had lost their shapes. Reeser's skull had survived and was found among the ashes, but shrunken "to the size of a teacup", a description disputed by a fire researcher who was in Bradenton for a conference at the time and managed to view the scene.

== Investigation and results ==
On July 7, 1951, St. Petersburg police chief J. R. Reichert sent a box of evidence from the scene to FBI director J. Edgar Hoover. He included glass fragments found in the ashes, six "small objects thought to be teeth", a section of the carpet, and the surviving shoe. Reichert included a note saying: "We request any information or theories that could explain how a human body could be so destroyed and the fire confined to such a small area and so little damage done to the structure of the building and the furniture in the room not even scorched or damaged by smoke."

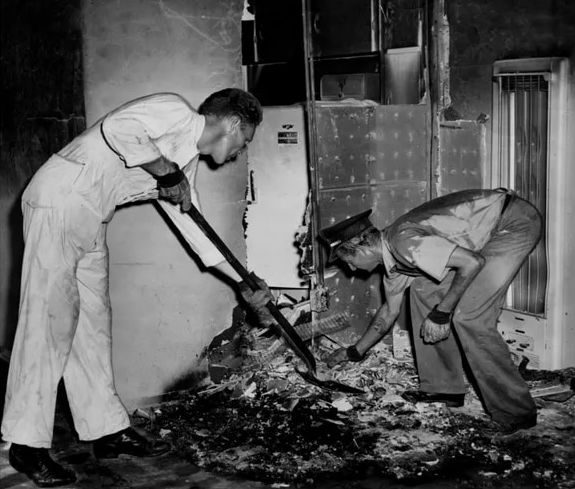
Workers clean up the scene of Reeser's death

The FBI eventually declared that Reeser had been incinerated by the wick effect. As she was a known user of sleeping pills, they hypothesized that she had fallen unconscious while smoking and set fire to her nightclothes. "Once the body starts to burn," the FBI wrote in its report, "there is enough fat and other inflammable substances to permit varying amounts of destruction to take place. Sometimes this destruction by burning will proceed to a degree which results in almost complete combustion of the body."

When interviewed by a local paper, Reeser's daughter-in-law said: "the cigarette dropped to her lap. Her fat was the fuel that kept her burning. The floor was cement, and the chair was by itself. There was nothing around her to burn".

== Personal life ==
Mary Reeser was born in Columbia, Pennsylvania and married Richard Reeser. Their only surviving child, also named Richard Reeser, was born in Pennsylvania in 1910. She was buried in the Chestnut Hill Cemetery outside Mechanicsburg, Pennsylvania. Her son died in 1998 at the age of 88. He had a daughter, Mary Carole, named for her grandmother, who died in 2005, and another daughter, Nancy, who died in 2021. Their mother died in 2008.
