= Spontaneous human combustion =

Allegedly unexplained human incineration

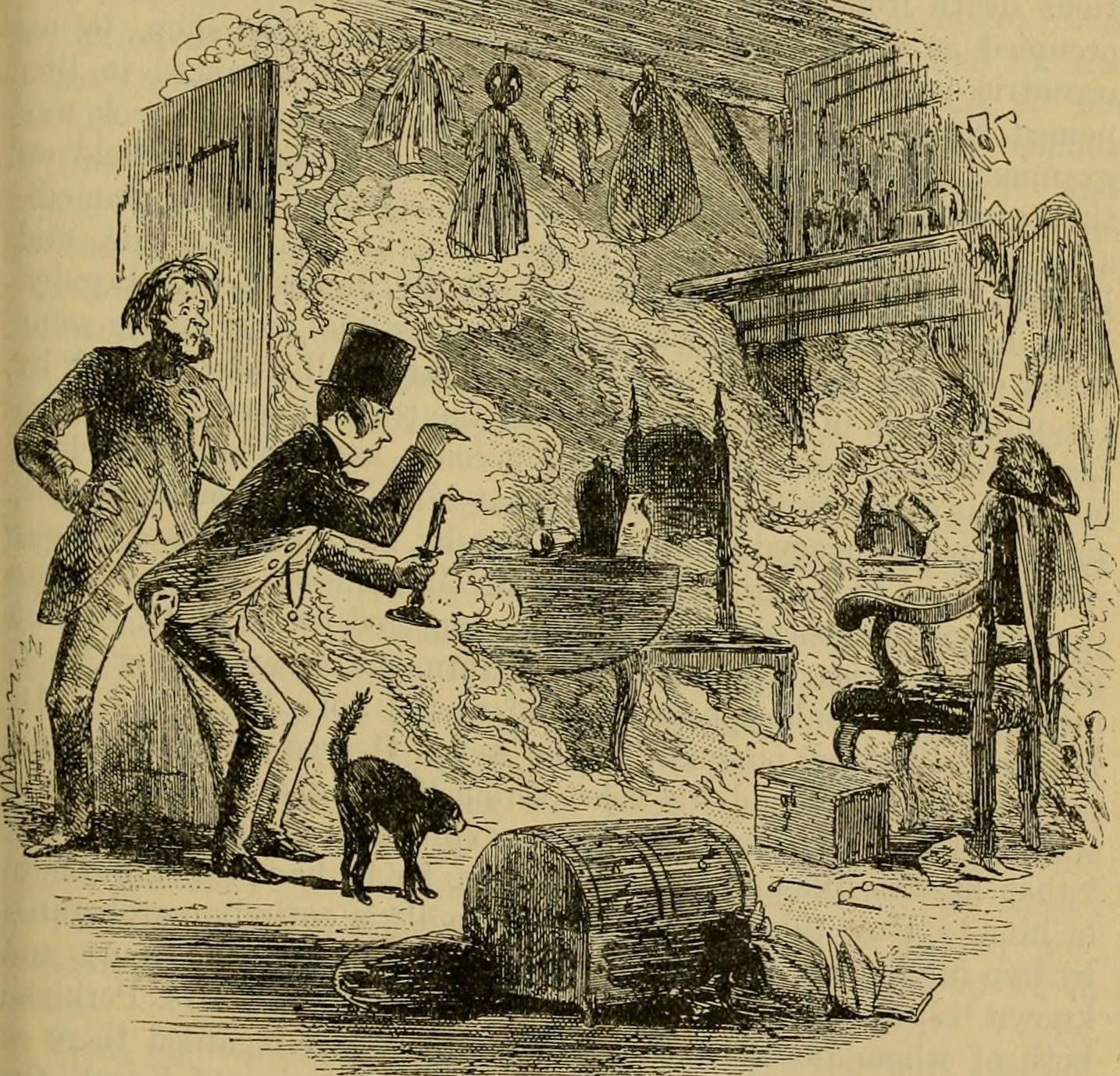
Depiction of spontaneous combustion from the Charles Dickens novel Bleak House by Hablot Knight Browne

Spontaneous human combustion (SHC) is the pseudoscientific concept of the spontaneous combustion of a living (or recently deceased) human body without an external source of ignition on the body. In addition to reported cases, descriptions of the alleged phenomenon appear in literature, and both types have been observed to share common characteristics in terms of circumstances and the remains of the victim.

Scientific investigations have attempted to analyze reported instances of SHC and have resulted in hypotheses regarding potential causes and mechanisms, including victim behavior and habits, alcohol consumption, and proximity to potential sources of ignition, as well as the behavior of fires that consume melted fats. Natural explanations, as well as unverified natural phenomena, have been proposed to explain reports of SHC. The current scientific consensus is that purported cases of SHC involve overlooked external sources of ignition.

== Overview ==
"Spontaneous human combustion" refers to the death from a fire originating without an apparent external source of ignition: a belief that the fire starts within the body of the victim. This idea and the term "spontaneous human combustion" were both first proposed in 1746 by Paul Rolli, a Fellow of the Royal Society, in an article published in the Philosophical Transactions concerning the mysterious death of Countess Cornelia Zangari Bandi. Writing in The British Medical Journal in 1938, coroner Gavin Thurston describes the phenomenon as having "apparently attracted the attention not only of the medical profession but of the non-medical professionals one hundred years ago" (referring to a fictional account published in 1834 in the Frederick Marryat cycle). In his 1995 book Ablaze!, Larry E. Arnold, a director of ParaScience International, wrote that there had been about 200 cited reports of spontaneous human combustion worldwide over a period of around 300 years.

=== Characteristics ===
The topic received coverage in the British Medical Journal in 1938. An article by L. A. Parry cited an 1823-published book Medical Jurisprudence, which stated that commonalities among recorded cases of spontaneous human combustion included the following characteristics:

1. the victims are chronic alcoholics;
2. they are usually elderly females;
3. the body has not burned spontaneously, but some lighted substance has come into contact with it;
4. the hands and feet usually fall off;
5. the fire has caused very little damage to combustible things in contact with the body;
6. the combustion of the body has left a residue of greasy and fetid ashes, very offensive in odour.

Alcoholism is a common theme in early SHC literary references, in part because some Victorian era physicians and writers believed spontaneous human combustion was the result of alcoholism. As of the mid-1800s, there were enough cases collected for a common etiology to emerge: the victims are fat middle-aged women who drink excessively. This made their tissues highly flammable. Once ignited, they burn a light-blue that cannot be extinguished by water. Almost all cases were women of disrepute, some of whom were said to subsist entirely on alcoholic drinks. A rare exception was countess Cornelia Zangari de Bandi, who was said to bathe regularly in "camphorated spirits of wine".

== Scientific investigation ==
An extensive two-and-a-half-year research project, involving 30 historical cases of alleged SHC from 1725 to 1982, was conducted by science investigator Joe Nickell and forensic analyst John F. Fischer. Their lengthy, two-part report was published in 1984 in the journal of the International Association of Arson Investigators, and incorporated into their 1988 book Secrets of the Supernatural. Nickell has written frequently on the subject, appeared on television documentaries, conducted additional research, and lectured at the New York State Academy of Fire Science at Montour Falls, New York, as a guest instructor.

The Nickell and Fischer investigation, which looked at cases in the 18th, 19th and 20th centuries, showed that the burned cadavers were close to plausible sources for the ignition: candles, lamps, fireplaces, and so on. Such sources were often omitted from published accounts of these incidents, presumably to deepen the aura of mystery surrounding an apparently "spontaneous" death. The investigations also found that there was a correlation between alleged SHC deaths and the victim's intoxication (or other forms of incapacitation) which could conceivably have caused them to be careless and unable to respond properly to an accident. Where the destruction of the body was not particularly extensive, a primary source of combustible fuel could plausibly have been the victim's clothing or a covering such as a blanket or comforter.

However, where the destruction was extensive, additional fuel sources were involved, such as chair stuffing, floor coverings, the flooring itself, and the like. The investigators described how such materials helped to retain melted fat, which caused more of the body to be burned and destroyed, yielding still more liquified fat, in a cyclic process known as the "wick effect" or the "candle effect".

According to the Nickell and Fischer investigation, nearby objects often remained undamaged because fire tends to burn upwards, but burns laterally with some difficulty. The fires in question are relatively small, achieving considerable destruction by the wick effect, and nearby objects may not be close enough to catch fire themselves (much as one can closely approach a modest campfire without burning). As with other mysteries, Nickell and Fischer cautioned against a "single, simplistic explanation for all unusual burning deaths" but rather urged investigating "on an individual basis". Neurologist Steven Novella has said that skepticism about spontaneous human combustion is now bleeding over into becoming popular skepticism about spontaneous combustion.

In a 2002 study, Angi M. Christensen of the University of Tennessee cremated both healthy and osteoporotic samples of human bone and compared the resulting color changes and fragmentation. The study found that osteoporotic bone samples "consistently displayed more discoloration and a greater degree of fragmentation than healthy ones." The same study found that when human tissue is burned, the resulting flame produces a small amount of heat, indicating that fire is unlikely to spread from burning tissue.

== Suggested explanations ==
The scientific consensus is that incidents which might appear as spontaneous combustion did in fact have an external source of ignition, and that spontaneous human combustion without an external ignition source is extremely implausible. Pseudoscientific hypotheses have been presented which attempt to explain how SHC might occur without an external flame source. Benjamin Radford, science writer and deputy editor of the science magazine Skeptical Inquirer, casts doubt on the plausibility of spontaneous human combustion: "If SHC is a real phenomenon (and not the result of an elderly or infirm person being too close to a flame source), why doesn't it happen more often? There are 8 billion people in the world [ today in 2024], and yet we don't see reports of people bursting into flame while walking down the street, attending football games, or sipping a coffee at a local Starbucks."

=== Natural explanations ===
- Almost all postulated cases of SHC involve people with low mobility due to advanced age or obesity, along with poor health. Victims show a high likelihood of having died in their sleep, or of having been unable to move once they had caught fire.
- Smoking is often seen as the source of fire. Natural causes such as heart attacks may lead to the victim dying, subsequently dropping the cigarette, which after a period of smouldering can ignite the victim's clothes.
- The "wick effect" hypothesis suggests that a small external flame source, such as a burning cigarette, chars the clothing of the victim at a location, splitting the skin and releasing subcutaneous fat, which is in turn absorbed into the burned clothing, acting as a wick. This combustion can continue for as long as the fuel is available. This hypothesis has been successfully tested with pig tissue and is consistent with evidence recovered from cases of human combustion. The human body typically has enough stored energy in fat and other chemical stores to fully combust the body; even lean people have several pounds of fat in their tissues. This fat, once heated by the burning clothing, wicks into the clothing much as candle wax is drawn into a lit candle wick, providing the fuel needed to keep the wick burning. The protein in the body also burns, but provides less energy than fat, with the water in the body being the main impediment to combustion. However, slow combustion, lasting hours, gives the water time to evaporate slowly. In an enclosed area, such as a house, this moisture will recondense nearby, possibly on windows. Feet don't typically burn because they often have the least fat; hands also have little fat, but may burn if resting on the abdomen, which provides all of the necessary fat for combustion.
- Scalding can cause burn-like injuries, sometimes leading to death, without setting fire to clothing. Although not applicable in cases where the body is charred and burnt, this has been suggested as a cause in at least one claimed SHC-like event.
- Brian J. Ford has suggested that ketosis, possibly caused by alcoholism or low-carb dieting, produces acetone, which is highly flammable and could therefore lead to apparently spontaneous combustion.
- SHC can be confused with self-immolation as a form of suicide. In the West, self-immolation accounts for 1% of suicides, while in other countries it can be higher.
- Sometimes there are reasonable explanations for the deaths, but proponents ignore official autopsies and contradictory evidence in favor of anecdotal accounts and personal testimonies.
- Inhaling or digesting phosphorus in different forms may lead to the formation of phosphine, which can autoignite.

== Examples ==
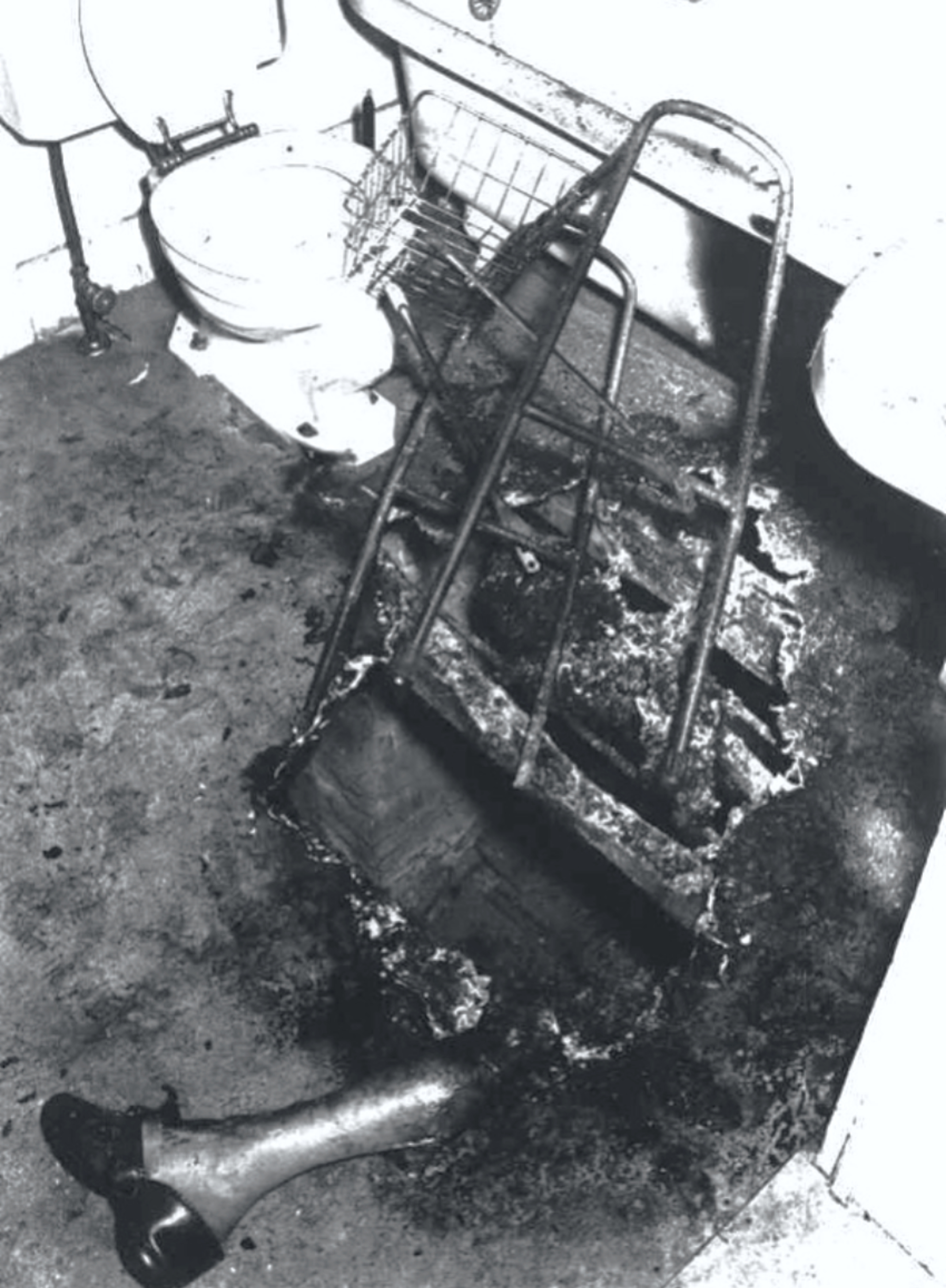
Death scene of John Irving Bentley in December 1966

On 2 July 1951, Mary Reeser, a 67-year-old woman, was found burned to death in her house in St. Petersburg, Florida, after her landlady noted that the house's doorknob was unusually warm. The landlady notified the police, and upon entering the home they found only a leg of Reeser's and the rest completely burned in ash. The chair she was sitting in was also destroyed. Reeser had taken sleeping pills and had also been a smoker. Despite its proliferation in popular culture, the contemporary FBI investigation ruled out the possibility of SHC. A common theory was that she was smoking a cigarette after taking sleeping pills and then fell asleep while still holding the burning cigarette, which could have ignited her gown, ultimately leading to her death. Her daughter-in-law stated, "The cigarette dropped to her lap. Her fat was the fuel that kept her burning. The floor was cement, and the chair was by itself. There was nothing around her to burn".

Margaret Hogan, an 89-year-old widow who lived alone in a house on Prussia Street, Dublin, Ireland, was found burned almost to the point of complete destruction on 28 March 1970. Plastic flowers on a table in the centre of the room had been reduced to liquid and a television with a melted screen sat 12 feet from the armchair in which the ashen remains were found; otherwise, the surroundings were almost untouched. Her two feet, and both legs from below the knees, were undamaged. A small coal fire had been burning in the grate when a neighbour left the house the previous day; however, no connection between this fire and that in which Mrs. Hogan died could be found. An inquest, held on 3 April 1970, recorded death by burning, with the cause of the fire listed as "unknown".

On 24 November 1979, during Thanksgiving weekend, Beatrice Oczki, a 51-year-old woman, was found charred to death in her home in the village of Bolingbrook, Illinois, United States.

Henry Thomas, a 73-year-old man, was found burned to death in the living room of his council house on the Rassau estate in Ebbw Vale, South Wales, in 1980. Most of his body was incinerated, leaving only his skull and part of each leg below the knee. The feet and legs were still clothed in socks and trousers. Half of the chair in which he had been sitting was also destroyed. Police forensic officers decided that the incineration of Thomas was due to the wick effect.

In December 2010, the death of Michael Faherty, a 76-year-old man in County Galway, Ireland, was recorded as "spontaneous combustion" by the coroner. The doctor, Ciaran McLoughlin, made this statement at the inquiry into the death: "This fire was thoroughly investigated and I'm left with the conclusion that this fits into the category of spontaneous human combustion, for which there is no adequate explanation."

The Skeptic magazine has discussed the 1899 case of two children from the same family who were burned to death in different places at the same time. The evidence showed that although the coincidence seemed strange, the children both loved to play with fire and had been "whipped" for this behavior in the past. Looking at all the evidence, the coroner and jury ruled that these were both accidental deaths.

== In popular culture ==
- Charles Brockden Brown's 1798 novel Wieland: or, The Transformation: An American Tale features the death of the Wieland family's patriarch via spontaneous human combustion during prayer within his property's temple.
- In the novel Redburn by Herman Melville published in 1849, a sailor, Miguel Saveda, is consumed by "animal combustion" while in a drunken stupor on the return voyage from Liverpool to New York.
- In the novel Bleak House by Charles Dickens, the character Mr. Krook dies of spontaneous combustion at the end of Part X. Dickens researched the details of a number of contemporary accounts of spontaneous human combustion before writing that part of the novel and, after receiving criticism from a scientist friend suggesting he was perpetuating a "vulgar error", cites some of these cases in Part XI and again in the preface to the one-volume edition. The death of Mr. Krook has been described as "the most famous case in literature" of spontaneous human combustion.
- The idea of spontaneous human combustion is brought up in two episodes in X-Files, even believed by the more skeptical Agent Scully. But for each episode where it's theorized as a possibility, another cause was found and its not combustion. In Soft Light, it is found that the victim's molecules are split into pure energy by a black hole like effect. In Trevor, the victims are killed by large sudden electrical burns and not combustion.
- In the 1984 mockumentary film This is Spinal Tap , both the band's drummer Peter "James" Bond, and drummer Mick Shrimpton die from spontaneous human combustion onstage.

== See also ==
- Exploding animal
- Fan death
- Pyrokinesis
