= Tesco Ireland =

Irish retailer and subsidiary of Tesco

Tesco Ireland Limited
- The current logo
- Formerly: Quinnsworth (1966–1997)
- Type: Subsidiary, Limited company
- Industry: Retailing
- Predecessor: Powers' Supermarkets Ltd
- Founded: 1966; 60 years ago
- Founder: Pat Quinn
- Headquarters: Dun Laoghaire, County Dublin, Ireland
- Number of locations: 194 stores
- Area served: Ireland
- Key people: Andrew Yaxley (Chief Executive Officer); Gabriel Kyle (Chairman)
- Products: Grocery, clothing, electrical, homewares
- Revenue: €31.95 billion (2022)
- Operating income: €2.99 billion (2022)
- Number of employees: 13,500 (2026)
- Parent: Tesco plc
- Website: tesco.ie

Tesco Ireland Limited is the Irish subsidiary of supermarket group Tesco. Tesco Ireland was formed by Tesco plc's 1997 purchase of the Irish retailing operations of Associated British Foods, namely Powers' Supermarkets Limited and its subsidiaries, trading as Quinnsworth and Crazy Prices. There are 152 Tesco stores in operation in Ireland as of August 2018. Tesco had approximately 21% of the Irish grocery market in 2021 and its main competitors are Dunnes Stores and SuperValu.

Tesco operates mid to full-sized supermarkets under the main Tesco brand, hypermarkets branded as Tesco Extra, a small number of convenience stores as Tesco Express, as well as internet shopping service Tesco.ie. It previously operated several petrol stations, which were divested in August 2019 to DCC plc. In 2007, the company launched its mobile telephone service, Tesco Mobile. Tesco Ireland operated a number of 24-hour stores, but has abandoned 24-hour opening as of 2014, with all stores closed from 00:00-06:00.

== History ==
=== Quinnsworth era ===
Quinnsworth logo

The company was founded as "Quinnsworth" by Pat Quinn in 1966, and was later sold to Power Supermarkets. During the 1970s the slogan used was "Let's get it all together at Quinnsworth". Power Supermarkets Ltd. became the parent company but used Quinnsworth as its marketing name. The company became a wholly owned subsidiary of Associated British Foods plc.

Quinnsworth is remembered for its choice of store sites, its most memorable act was the addition of the phrase Yellow Pack to the retailing lexicon. Towards the end of Quinnsworth's life, Yellow Pack was replaced by K.V.I. label as the low-cost generic grocery brand, and a high quality generic line called Premium Choice modeled after Loblaws President's Choice (Loblaws being owned by another branch of the Weston family). Quinnsworth was also remembered for its advertising campaigns featuring its marketing director (and later chief executive) Maurice Pratt, who would personally introduce new product promotions, ending each advert with the company slogan, "That's Real Value".

Crazy Prices (occasionally Super Crazy Prices) was a brand used by Quinnsworth on some of its larger outlets. These were known for their cheap prices. Crazy Prices was one of the first retailers in Ireland to introduce late night opening (until 9pm) on Wednesdays, dubbing this night "Crazy Night" and running special in-store promotions. Until the mid-1990s, most Irish retailers only opened late one night a week, usually Thursday (in Dublin city) or Friday. KVI branding was Crazy Prices equivalent to the Quinnsworth Yellow pack. It came in blue red and white striped packaging. K.V.I. stood for "Keen Value Item" and was the equivalent of the previous Quinnsworth Yellow Pack, except perhaps even further downmarket.

=== Tesco era ===
On 6 May 1997, Tesco acquired the retailing and supply chain operations of Associated British Foods - with the sole exception of Primark - for £643 million.

The grocery businesses acquired were those held by Comar Limited in the Republic of Ireland and Stewarts Supermarkets Limited in Northern Ireland. Comar was the parent company of Powers Supermarkets Ltd (trading as Quinnsworth) and Crazy Prices in the Republic of Ireland. Stewarts Supermarkets included Crazy Prices in Northern Ireland.

Other businesses acquired were the Stewarts Wine Barrel off-licence chain, the sports goods retailer Lifestyle Sports, the meat processing and packing business Kingsway Fresh Foods Ltd. and the Fresh fruit and vegetable distributor Daily Wrap Produce Ltd.

The Northern Ireland operations were folded into Tesco's core UK business, while the Republic of Ireland operations became Tesco Ireland. Lifestyle Sports was demerged in 1997 via a management buy-out of seven directors and the venture capital company, ACT. Stewarts Wine Barrel was sold to United Wine Merchants.

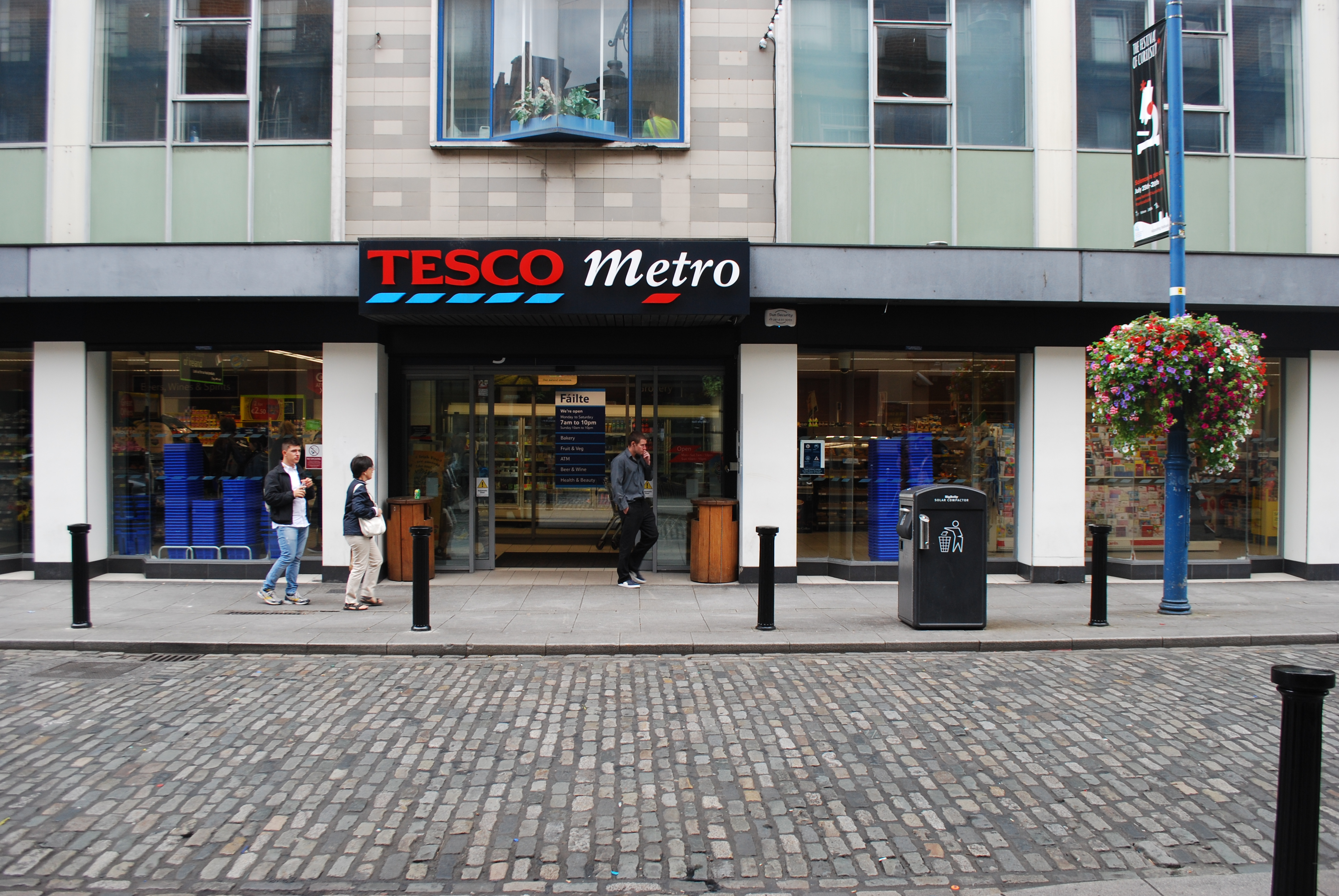
Tesco Metro in Temple Bar, Dublin.

After the acquisition of Power Supermarkets (PSL) by Tesco, the company name changed to "Tesco Ireland Limited". The first signs of the new regime was the almost immediate introduction of the Tesco own-brand (with advertising stating "Tesco at Quinnsworth and Crazy Prices"), with the completion of the phasing out of Yellow Pack and the other PSL own-brands such as KVI and Premium Choice. Maurice Pratt stayed on as chief executive of the Irish operations.

Over the next few years, the Quinnsworth and Crazy Prices chains were rebranded as Tesco Ireland, using a white-on-blue variation of the familiar Tesco logo. The first store to open under the Tesco name was in Athlone in 1997. The changeover was at first relatively slow, with the Quinnsworth and Crazy Prices names continuing to appear on adverts for some time after the launch of the new company identity. Tesco's initial policy was not to change the name over the door until the store had been upgraded to Tesco's standards, in some older stores this meant a significant rebuild of the premises. The first fully rebuilt store opened in Maynooth in 2000, which has since been redeveloped again as a Tesco Extra. Some older stores continued to trade under the Quinnsworth and Crazy Prices name until the early 2000s.

In 2001, Maurice Pratt, who had been the public face of Quinnsworth, left the company to become chief executive of C&C, later taking up a post as chairman of Bank of Scotland (Ireland). He was replaced by Gordon Fryett.

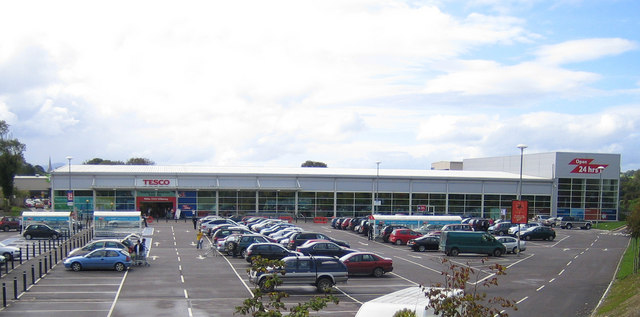
Tesco Superstore in Killarney.

In the late 2000s, Tesco Ireland gradually rebranded as simply "Tesco", using the regular red-on-white Tesco logo.

The company opened its first Irish "Tesco Extra" hypermarket at the Clare Hall Shopping Centre in Coolock, north Dublin in 2004, and has also branched into filling stations. Many stores are now also open 24 hours. The company has also moved into the convenience store market, with the first a converted Quinnsworth (then the smallest store in the chain) in Drumcondra, opened as a "Tesco Local". This was the only store to use this brand in Ireland, with one store in Northern Ireland using the name as well, as subsequent new convenience stores use the "Tesco Express" brand instead.

Tesco has also expanded its product range in Ireland. The Tesco Extra hypermarkets, as well as larger Tesco stores, now stock a range of clothing, electrical goods, music, DVDs and video games, as well as newspapers, magazines, and toys. The Naas, County Kildare store is the first in Ireland to have a Tesco Pharmacy.

On 30 November 2021, it was announced that Tesco Ireland had acquired the rival Joyce's supermarket chain. In 2022, the business began rebranding the former Joyce's shops. Tesco was required to sell Joyce's Oranmore supermarket in order to obtain the approval of the Competition and Consumer Protection Commission's, due to there already being a Tesco supermarket in the town.

== Tesco.ie ==
In October 2000, Tesco Ireland launched its Tesco.ie online shopping service for the Dublin area. The service expanded and by the end of the decade it was available nationwide.

== Criticisms ==
=== Operations ===
Tesco Ireland has come in for increased criticism for apparently high prices in its Irish stores. However, there have been general criticisms of the similar pricing between Irish supermarkets, and economic reports noting the high prices in Ireland generally. Research from Forfas, concluded that only a five per cent difference in the cost of goods between North and South was justifiable. Despite claims from Tesco that it matched prices in the Republic of Ireland with prices in Northern Ireland, a November 2009 survey by Consumers Choice magazine has claimed that, on average, prices are still 18% more expensive in the Republic In June 2012, Eurostat blamed "overly dominant supermarkets" as a factor why Ireland is the fifth most expensive nation in the EU in terms of supermarket prices. Tesco increased the prices of some well-known products significantly just weeks into 2011 before reducing them as part of a 1,000-product price promotion launched in March 2011.

Tesco Ireland was one of seven shops fined for failing to display prices properly by the National Consumer Agency in July 2008.

Tesco Ireland decided in 2019 not to make home deliveries in Tallaght due to anti-social behaviour incidents in the area.

Tesco apologised for selling anti-Jewish literature to customers in Ireland. Sheikh Dr Shaheed Satardien, head of the Muslim Council of Ireland, said this was effectively "polluting the minds of impressionable young [Islamic] people with hate and anger towards the Jewish community".

The supermarket refused in 2002 to stock any of the million postcards which were aimed at closing the controversial nuclear reprocessing plant at Sellafield in Cumbria, in England. Competing retailers did sell the postcards.

Tesco tried to hide its policy of buying directly from UK suppliers. An internal document said that ensuring its policy of taking deliveries directly from UK suppliers went unnoticed and "invisible to the Irish customer" was a key objective. At the same time the Irish Farmers' Association president said there was deep anger about Tesco's decision to displace local produce with imports "will inevitably lead to thousands of job losses and will put Irish producers of local, fresh produce out of business,"

In 2008 The Irish Independent reported that roles in Tesco Ireland's head office in Dún Laoghaire were being redeployed to the UK and outsourced to India. The Irish Times commented in April 2011 that "Increasingly, Ireland is being viewed as a provincial backwater by the parent company – albeit a very profitable little backwater – and all the strategic decisions are being taken in the UK.

Tesco used the slogan "Change for Good" as advertising, which is trademarked by Unicef for charity usage but is not trademarked for commercial or retail use which prompted the agency to say "it is the first time in Unicef's history that a commercial entity has purposely set out to capitalise on one of our campaigns and subsequently damage an income stream which several of our programmes for children are dependent on". They went on to call on the public "who have children’s welfare at heart, to consider carefully who they support when making consumer choices".

Large supermarket chains were accused by Fine Gael of putting up to 100,000 Irish jobs at risk by forcing suppliers to pay €160 million a year in "hello money". The company was the subject of claims in February 2010 of demanding up to €500,000 per supplier for stocking goods. The leader of the Labour Party described the practice as "outrageous extortion" and was "like the kind of thing you expect to see in The Sopranos."

In early 2011, Tesco warned Irish publishers that it would ban their books from its shelves if they did not comply with its rules. A bestseller, which sparked the controversy over the revelation about Sean FitzPatrick's golf meeting with Taoiseach Brian Cowen, was published in secret and distributed directly to Easons and selected bookstores—but not to Tesco or other supermarkets. The secret last-minute delivery was organised to avoid any legal complications that might have prevented publication. Tesco said "if we find evidence of this happening (again), the offending publisher will have all their titles removed from sale and returned". One publisher pointed out that Tesco sometimes implements exclusive deals itself.

Tesco was convicted of a breach of consumer law for not displaying the right price of goods in October 2011.

In January 2012, a former Tesco employee was awarded damages at the Employment Appeals Tribunal where he claimed there was a link between his dismissal and his HIV status. Tesco stated that he was dismissed for gross misconduct, i.e. consuming a product without paying for it.

In February 2013, it was reported that staff at a Tesco warehouse were made to wear digital arm-band devices that monitor their performance.

Tesco was branded "hypocritical" by Irish poultry farmers for its commitment to source all UK-sold fresh poultry from the UK, but not doing the same in Ireland. This is putting pressure on prices in Ireland as surplus poultry meat from the UK is being dumped on the market.

=== Marketing and advertising ===
The Irish Advertising Standards Authority in January 2009 found that Tesco Ireland advertising was misleading.

Britain's Advertising Standards Authority said a leaflet produced by Tesco Ireland Ltd, was ‘‘irresponsible’’ and breached clauses in the advertising code on substantiation and weight control in May 2010.

Tesco pleaded guilty and was fined, after sending unsolicited marketing emails to a number of customers and for having a problem with the email "opt-out" option.

=== Food safety ===
The Food Safety Authority of Ireland, has on a number of occasions ordered the recall of Tesco branded products, including a case of glass contamination. Environmental Health Officers served a closure order on Tesco's store in Prussia Street, Dublin, the day after they inspected it, for a number of breaches of Food Hygiene Regulations. Most food is imported from Britain, where the BBC's Whistleblower programme showed undercover footage showing the sale of products after their sell-by date; allegations that the company illegally sold 'back-labelled' products after their use by date; falsification of temperature records; and the sale of partially cooked mince mixed with uncooked mince.

In May 2012, it pleaded guilty to selling "gone off" (decayed or rotten) meat and the next month was prosecuted and fined for breaches of consumer law.

The Food Safety Authority of Ireland found horse meat, consumption of which is considered taboo in Ireland, accounted for approximately 29% of the meat content in beef burger products from Tesco in January 2013.

== Financial performance ==
Tesco's Irish profit margin was 9.3 per cent in 2008, making the Irish operation Tesco's most successful worldwide in margin terms.

== Tesco Mobile ==
On 26 October 2007, Tesco Ireland announced that 'An extensive range of Tesco Mobile prepay handsets will be rolled out to 48 Tesco stores from Monday 29 October'. Tesco Mobile launched as a Mobile Virtual Network Operator (MVNO), piggybacking on the O_{2} Network in Ireland. It had also outsourced the running of Tesco Mobile to Fujitsu Ireland. The network uses the 089 prefix.

Up to March 2015, Tesco Mobile Ireland operated as an MVNO on the O2 Ireland network. O2 Ireland has since been purchased and merged with Three Ireland and as a result, Tesco Mobile now operates as an MVNO on the Three Ireland Network with 99.6% coverage.

== See also ==
- Tesco Donabate Distribution Centre
