= Merlinpark Castle =

Ruined tower house in County Galway, Ireland

- Caisleán Pháirc Mhuirlinne (Irish)
- Merlin Castle
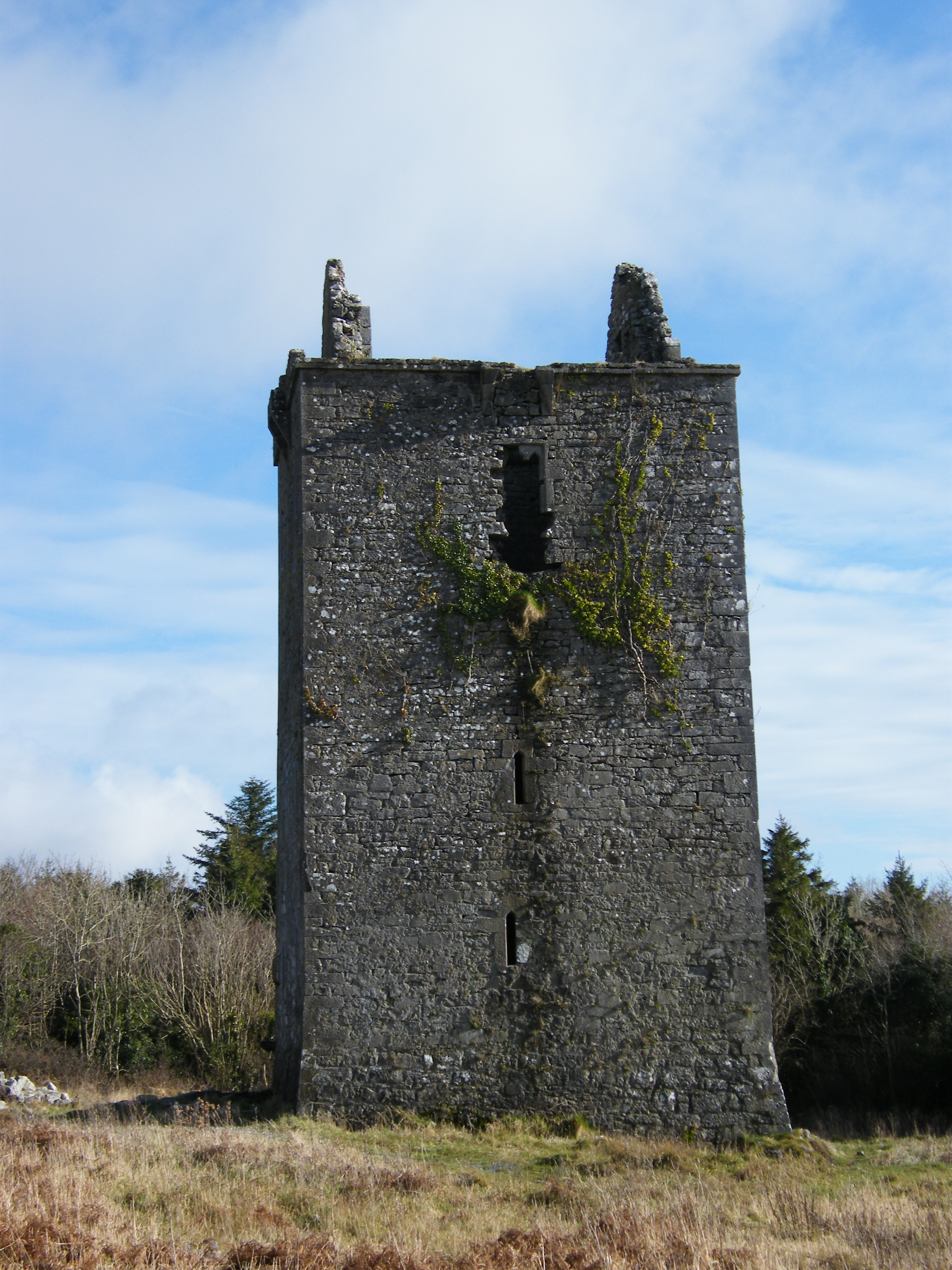

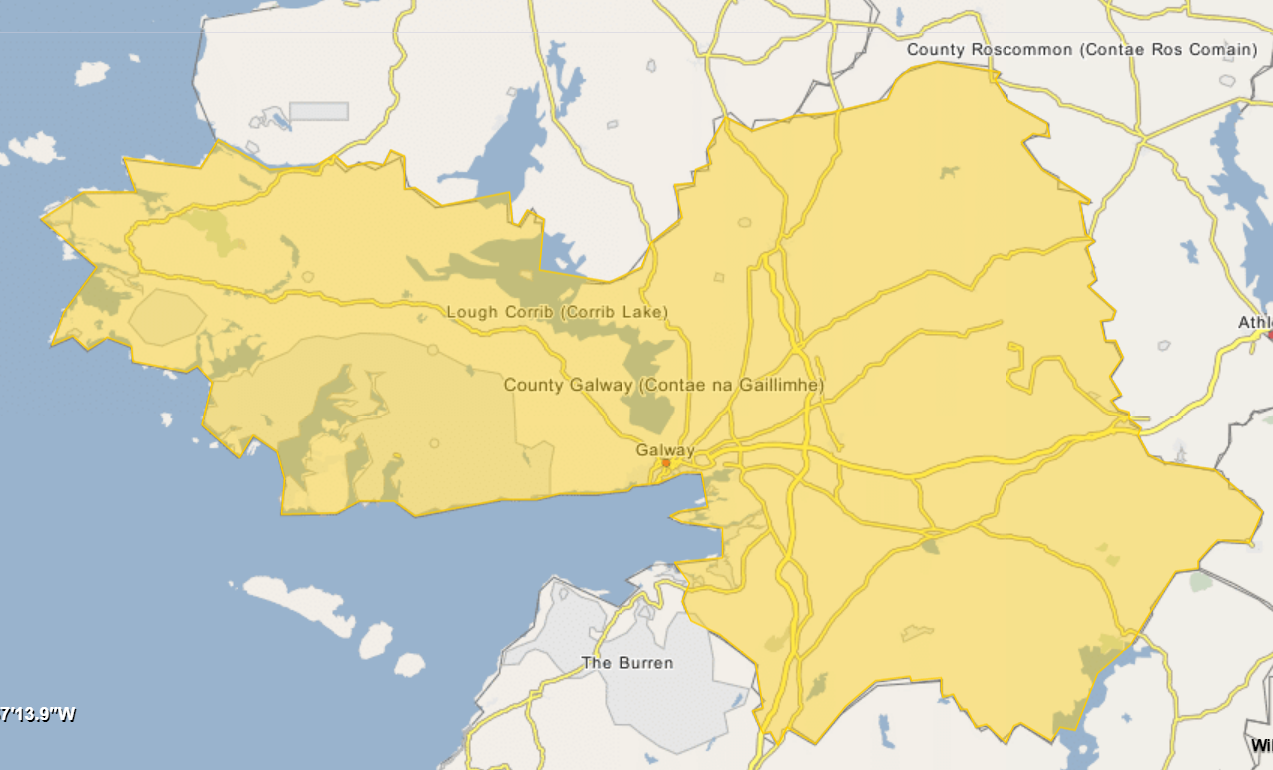
- Location within County Galway
- 53.27975°N 8.99808°W
- Type: tower house
- Location: Merlin Park, Galway, Ireland

History
- Built: 15th century

Site notes
- Owner: State

National monument of Ireland
- Official name: Merlinpark Castle
- Reference no.: 609

Merlinpark Castle or Merlin Castle is a tower house and national monument located in County Galway, Ireland, close to the grounds of Merlin Park University Hospital.

== Location ==
Merlinpark Castle, also sometimes known as Merlin Castle or Doughiske Castle, is located 4 km (2½ miles) east-northeast of Galway city centre in the townland of Merlinpark.

== History ==
While the area may have contained an earlier fortification associated with Tairrdelbach Ua Conchobair (King of Connacht and High King of Ireland in the 12th century), the tower house of Merlin Castle dates from the 15th or 16th century. It was owned by the Lynch family (Ó Loingsigh) in the 16th century. Still in good condition, it was lived in until the mid-19th century.

The tower house, which was known as 'Doughiske Castle' until the 18th century, has the remains of a sheela na gig carving on the second floor.
