= Eoin Concannon (Gaelic footballer) =

Irish Gaelic football player

Personal information
- Native name: Eoin Ó Concheanainn (Irish)
- Born: 6 June 1988 (age 38) Galway, Ireland
- Height: 5 ft 11 in (180 cm)

Sport
- Sport: Gaelic Football
- Position: Right corner forward
Club
- Years: Club
- 2005–: St James'
Club titles
- Galway titles: 1
- Connacht titles: 1
Inter-county
- Years: County
- 2010–2014: Galway

Eoin Concannon (born 6 June 1988 in Galway) is a Gaelic football player who plays club football for St James' and inter-county for Galway from 2010 until he was dropped from the squad in 2014.

Concannon represented the Galway Minor team in 2005 and 2006, winning a Connacht Minor Football Championship in 2005.
