= Galway Clinic =

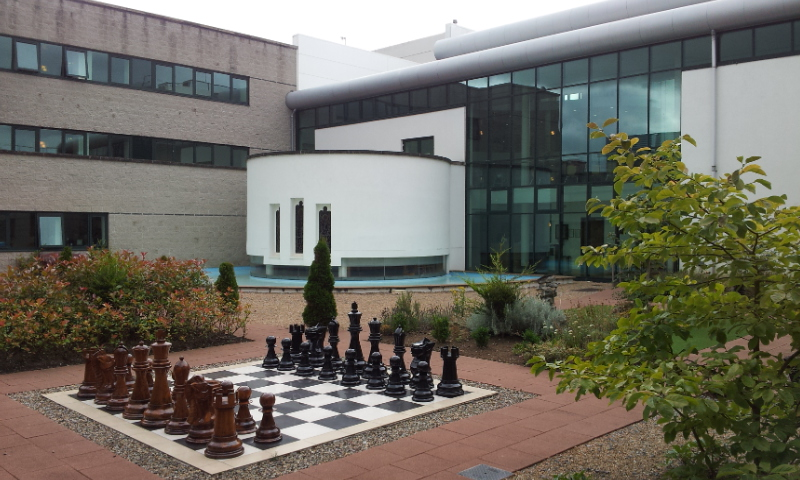
- Central Courtyard, Galway Clinic

- Shown in Ireland

Geography
- Location: Galway, Ireland
- Coordinates: 53.2823°N 8.9762°W

Services
- Emergency department: Yes
- Beds: 136

History
- Founded: 2004

Links
- Website: www.galwayclinic.com

The Galway Clinic (Irish: Clinic na Gaillimhe) is a private hospital in Galway, Ireland.

== History ==
The hospital was founded by surgeons Joseph Sheehan and Jimmy Sheehan, who had established the Blackrock Clinic in Dublin. It was built at a cost of €100 million and opened in June 2004. It brought radiation therapy, cardiac surgery and PET/CT scanning to the west of Ireland for the first time.

== Services ==
The hospital has 136 beds and 36 consultant suites.
