= Wick effect =

Fire hazard of clothed human body

The wick effect is an alleged partial or total destruction of a human body by fire, when the clothing of the victim soaks up melted human fat and acts like the wick of a candle. The wick effect, in conjunction with an external source of ignition, is one possible explanation for incidents attributed to the phenomenon of spontaneous human combustion.

== Details ==
The wick effect theory describes how a person can be kept aflame through their own subcutaneous fats after being ignited, accidentally or otherwise. The clothed human body acts like an "inside-out" candle, with the fuel source (human fat) inside and the wick (the clothing of the victim) outside. Hence there is a continuous supply of fuel in the form of melting fat seeping into the victim's clothing. Fat contains a large amount of energy due to the presence of long hydrocarbon chains.

== Examples ==
=== Mary Reeser case ===
Mary Reeser (1884–1951) of St. Petersburg, Florida was most likely a victim of the wick effect. It was suspected that she had accidentally ignited herself with a cigarette. The fat which over time had been absorbed by her clothing likely acted as fuel for the fire. At the scene, investigators found melted fat in the rug near Mary's body.

=== 1963 Leeds case ===
An investigation of a 1963 case in Leeds included an experiment with a wick effect. A small portion of human fat was wrapped in cloth to simulate clothing. A Bunsen burner flame was then applied to the "candle". Due to the high water content of human fat, the flame had to be held on the "candle" for over a minute before it would catch fire:

"One end of the candle was ignited by a Bunsen flame, the fat catching fire after about a minute. Although the Bunsen was removed at this point, combustion of the fat proceeded slowly along the length of the roll, with a smoky yellow flame and much production of soot, the entire roll being consumed after about one hour."

This gives some indication of the slow speed with which the wick effect will proceed.

=== 1991 Oregon murder ===
In February 1991, in woodland near Medford, Oregon, USA, two hikers came across the burning body of a female adult identified as Roseanne Walter, lying face down in fallen leaves. They alerted the officials and a local deputy sheriff soon arrived. She had been stabbed several times in the upper regions of the chest and back. Both arms were spread outwards from the torso. The lower legs and surface of the neck showed signs of fire damage. The soft tissues of the right arm, torso and upper legs were consumed. The majority of bones of these parts retained their integrity, although friability was increased. Between the victim's mid-chest and knees the fleshy parts of the body were mostly destroyed. Crime scene personnel reported that the pelvis and spine were "not recoverable", having been reduced to a grey powder. Her killer had soaked the clothes and corpse in nearly a pint of barbecue starter fluid and set her on fire. In the well-oxygenated outdoor environment, this combination of circumstances, an immobile and clothed body with a high fat-to-muscle ratio, accelerant (lighter fluid), and artificial ignition, made it prime for the wick effect to occur. The murderer, James E. Griffin Jr. was arrested and made a full confession. He claimed to have set the body alight some 13 hours before it was discovered.

=== 1998 experiment ===
A larger scale experiment conducted for the BBC television programme Q.E.D. involved a dead pig's body being wrapped in a blanket and placed in a furnished room. The blanket was lit with the aid of a small amount of petrol. The body took some time to ignite and burned at a very high temperature with low flames. The heat collected at the top of the room and melted a television. However, the flames caused very little damage to the surroundings, and the body burned for a number of hours before it was extinguished and examined. On examination, it was observed that the flesh and bones in the burnt portion had been destroyed.

=== 2006 Geneva case ===
In October 2006, the body of a man was discovered at home in Geneva, almost completely incinerated between the mid-chest and the knees, most probably due to heart attack while smoking, followed by the wick effect. The chair containing the body was mostly consumed, but other objects in the room were almost undamaged, albeit covered with a brown oily or greasy coating. The source of the fire was most likely a cigarette or cigar. The man's dog also died in another room of the man's apartment; this was attributed to carbon monoxide poisoning.

=== 2010 Galway case ===
In December 2010, the cremated body of a 76-year-old man was found alongside an open fireplace in his home in Clareview Park at Ballybane in the Irish city of Galway. The fire investigators concluded that no accelerants were used and that the open fireplace was not the cause of the fire. The coroner in the case could not identify the cause of the death due to extensive internal organ damage and concluded that "this [case] fits into the category of spontaneous human combustion, for which there is no adequate explanation".

The body of the man, Michael Faherty, was found in the living room of his home on 22 December 2010. The scene was searched by forensic experts from the Gardaí and the fire service, and a post-mortem was carried out by pathologist Grace Callagy. Callagy noted that Faherty had suffered from Type 2 diabetes and hypertension, but had not died from heart failure. Callagy concluded that the "extensive nature of the burns sustained precludes determining the precise cause of death". In September 2011, the west Galway coroner informed an inquiry into the death that he had searched medical literature, and referred to Professor Bernard Knight's book on forensic pathology, which states that a high number of alleged incidents of spontaneous human combustion had taken place near an open fireplace or chimney. Benjamin Radford, deputy editor of the science magazine Skeptical Inquirer, questioned why the coroner had "conclusively ruled out" other possible explanations.
