= Spontaneous combustion =

Type of combustion

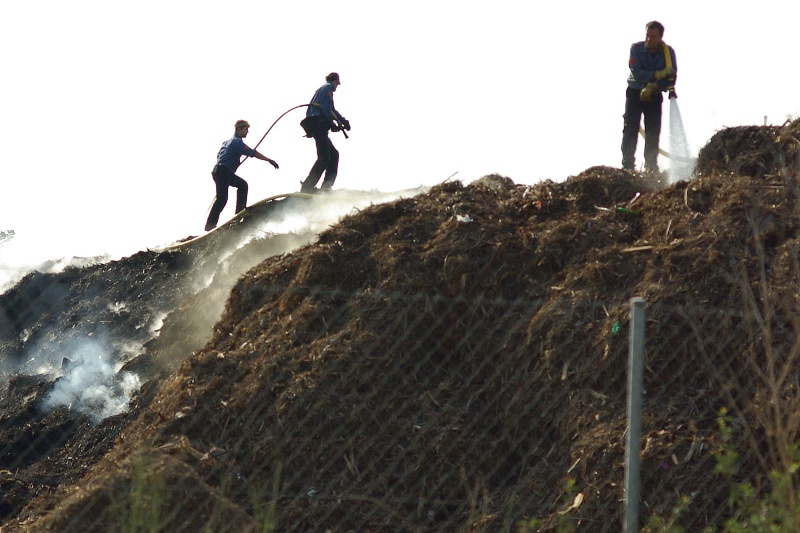
A large compost pile can spontaneously combust if improperly managed.

Spontaneous combustion or spontaneous ignition is a type of combustion which occurs by self-heating (increase in temperature due to exothermic internal reactions), followed by thermal runaway (self heating which rapidly accelerates to high temperatures) and finally, autoignition. It is distinct from (but has similar practical effects to) pyrophoricity, in which a compound needs no self-heat to ignite. The correct storage of spontaneously combustible materials is extremely important, as improper storage is the main cause of spontaneous combustion. Materials such as coal, cotton, hay and oils should be stored at proper temperatures and moisture levels to prevent spontaneous combustion. Reports of spontaneous human combustion are not considered truly spontaneous, but due to external ignition.

== Cause and ignition ==
Spontaneous combustion can occur when a substance with a relatively low ignition temperature such as hay, straw, peat, etc., begins to release heat. This may occur in several ways, either by oxidation in the presence of moisture and air, or by bacterial fermentation, which generates heat. These materials are thermal insulators that prevent the escape of heat causing the temperatures of the material to rise above its ignition point. Combustion will begin when a sufficient oxidizer, such as oxygen, and fuel are present to maintain the reaction into thermal runaway.

Thermal runaway can occur when the amount of heat produced is greater than the rate at which the heat is lost. Materials that produce a lot of heat may combust in relatively small volumes, while materials that produce very little heat may only become dangerous when well insulated or stored in large volumes. Most oxidation reactions accelerate at higher temperatures, so a pile of material that would have been safe at a low ambient temperature may spontaneously combust during hotter weather.

== Affected materials ==
=== Confirmed ===
Hay and compost piles may self-ignite because of heat produced by bacterial fermentation, which then can cause pyrolysis and oxidation that leads to thermal runaway reactions which can reach autoignition temperature. Rags soaked with drying oils or varnish can oxidize rapidly due to the large surface area, and even a small pile can produce enough heat to ignite under the right conditions. Coal can ignite spontaneously when exposed to oxygen, which causes it to react and heat up when there is insufficient ventilation for cooling. Pyrite oxidation is often the cause of coal's spontaneous ignition in old mine tailings. Pistachio nuts are highly flammable when stored in large quantities, and are prone to self-heating and spontaneous combustion. Large manure piles can spontaneously combust during conditions of extreme heat. Cotton and linen can ignite when they come into contact with polyunsaturated vegetable oils (linseed, massage oils); bacteria will slowly decompose the materials, producing heat. If these materials are stored in a way so the heat cannot escape, the heat buildup increases the rate of decomposition and thus the rate of heat buildup increases. Once ignition temperature is reached, combustion occurs with oxidizers present (oxygen). Nitrate film, when improperly stored, can deteriorate into an extremely flammable condition and combust. The 1937 Fox vault fire was caused by spontaneously combusting nitrate film.

=== Hay ===
Hay is one of the most widely studied materials in spontaneous combustion. It is very difficult to establish a unified theory of what occurs in hay self-heating because of the variation in the types of grass used in hay preparation, and the different locations where it is grown. It is anticipated that dangerous heating will occur in hay that contains more than 25% moisture. The largest number of fires occur within two to six weeks of storage, with the majority occurring in the fourth or fifth week.

The process may begin with microbiological activity (bacteria or mold) which ferments the hay, creating ethanol. Ethanol has a flash point of 14 °C (57 °F), so with an ignition source such as static electricity, e.g. from a mouse running through the hay, combustion may occur. The temperature then increases, igniting the hay itself.

Microbiological activity reduces the amount of oxygen available in the hay. At 100 °C (212 °F), wet hay absorbed twice the amount of oxygen of dry hay. There has been conjecture that the complex carbohydrates present in hay break down to simpler sugars, which are more readily fermented to ethanol.

=== Charcoal ===
Charcoal, when freshly prepared, can self-heat and catch fire. This is separate from hot spots which may have developed from the preparation of charcoal. Charcoal that has been exposed to air for a period of eight days is not considered to be hazardous. There are many factors involved, among them the type of wood and the temperature at which the charcoal was prepared.

=== Coal ===
Extensive studies have been completed on the self-heating of coal. Improper storage of coal is a main cause of spontaneous combustion, as there can be a continuous oxygen supply and the oxidization of coal produces heat that doesn't dissipate. Over time, these conditions can cause self-heating. The tendency to self-heat decreases with the increasing rank of the coal. Lignite coals are more active than bituminous coals, which are more active than anthracite coals. Freshly mined coal consumes oxygen more rapidly than weathered coal, and freshly mined coal self-heats to a greater extent than weathered coal. The presence of water vapor may also be important, as the rate of heat generation accompanying the absorption of water in dry coal from saturated air can be an order of magnitude or more than the same amount of dry air.

=== Cotton ===
Cotton too can be at great risk of spontaneous combustion. In an experimental study on the spontaneous combustion of cotton, three different types of cotton were tested at different heating rates and pressures. Different cotton varieties can have different self-heating oxidation temperature and larger reactions. Understanding what type of cotton is being stored will help reduce the risk of spontaneous combustion. A striking example of a cargo igniting spontaneously occurred on the ship Earl of Eldon in the Indian Ocean on 24 August 1834.

=== Oil seeds and oil-seed products ===
Oil seeds and residue from oil extraction will self-heat if too moist. Typically, storage at 9–14% moisture is satisfactory, but limits are established for each individual variety of oil seed. In the presence of excess moisture that is just below the level required for germinating seed, the activity of mold fungi is a likely candidate for generating heat. Many oil seeds generate oils that are self-heating. Rags soaked in linseed oil can spontaneously ignite if improperly stored or discarded.

=== Copra ===
Copra, the dried, white flesh of the coconut from which coconut oil is extracted, has been classed as dangerous goods due to its spontaneously combustive nature. It is identified as a Division 4.2 substance.

=== Human ===
There have been unconfirmed anecdotal reports of people spontaneously combusting. This alleged phenomenon is not considered true spontaneous combustion, as supposed cases have been largely attributed to the wick effect, whereby an external source of fire ignites nearby flammable materials and human fat or other sources.

=== Wool ===
Self-heating of wet wool in compressed bales is regarded as a likely cause of fires in wool, either at storage facilities or as ship cargoes.

== Predictions and preventions ==
There are many factors that can help predict spontaneous combustion and prevent it. The longer a material sits, the higher the risk of spontaneous combustion. Preventing spontaneous combustion can be as simple as not leaving materials stored for extended periods of time, controlling air flow, moisture, methane, and pressure balances. There are also many materials that prevent spontaneous combustion. For example, spontaneous coal combustion can be prevented by physical based materials such as chlorine salts, ammonium salts, alkalis, inert gases, colloids, polymers, aerosols, and LDHs, as well as chemical-based materials like antioxidants, ionic liquids, and composite materials.

== Bibliography ==
- Babrauskas, Vytenis (2003). Ignition Handbook. Boston: Society of Fire Protection Engineers. ISBN 978-0-9728111-3-2.
- Bowes, P. C. (1984). Self-heating: evaluating and controlling the hazards. London: Department of the Environment, Building Research Establishment. ISBN 978-0-11-671364-3.
