= Doughiska =

Doughiska Dabhach Uisce
- Townland
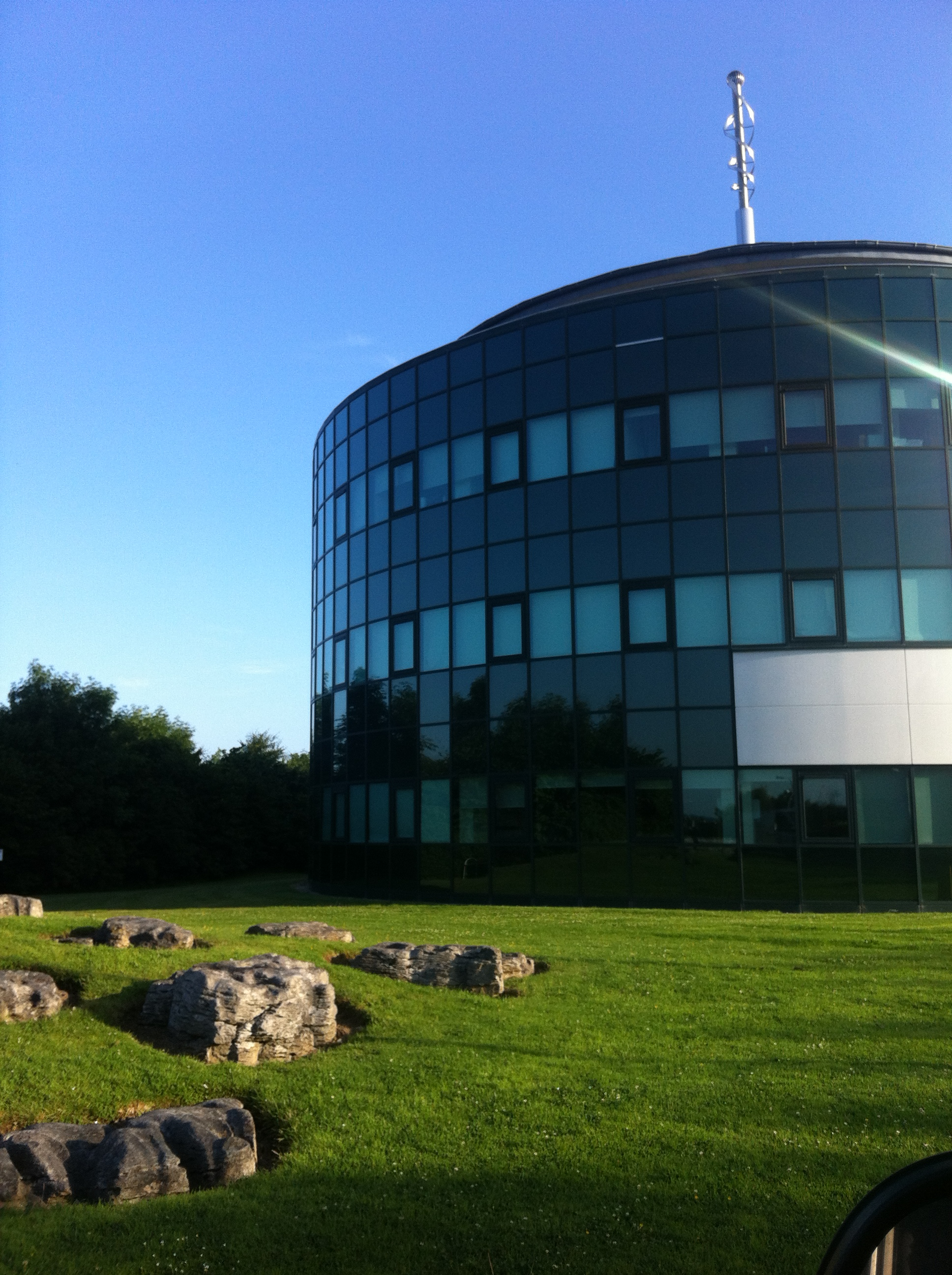
- Building within the Galway Clinic complex in the east of Doughiska

- Location in Ireland
- Coordinates: 53°17′00″N 8°59′02″W
- Country: Ireland
- Province: Connacht
- County: County Galway
- Time zone: UTC+0 (WET)
  - Summer (DST): UTC-1 (IST (WEST))
- Irish grid reference: M344264

Doughiska (Irish: Dabhach Uisce, meaning 'water basin') is a townland and suburb of Galway City in County Galway, Ireland. There has been continuous urban development between Doughiska and the city centre due to the growth of Galway City in the early 21st century.

== Name ==
In Origin and History of Irish Names of Places, published in the late 19th century, Patrick Weston Joyce proposes that the name Doughiska is a corruption of dubh uisce meaning "black water". The academic Tomás Seosamh Ó Máille, writing for the Galway Archaeological and Historical Society in 1949, suggests that the Irish name is "probably a corruption" of dumhach uisce, and that the area may have been referred to as Doughuske as early as the 16th century.

== Development ==
The area remained a rural area on the outskirts of Galway City, with only a few families farming the area until the late 20th century. The area also contained a "very fine marble quarry", with marble from this quarry being used in the refurbished Galway Cathedral.

Most of the open fields are now being developed for housing, hotels and business parks. The main reason for this is the presence of Bóthar na dTreabh, the dual carriageway leading into the city from the east. The area was the subject to significant development and demographic change in the early 21st century. Galway City council planners designated the area for development from the 1990s. Houses were built at a rapid rate and infrastructure was slow in following. However, in later years, the situation improved and the city's bus service was expanded to provide more frequent services to and from the city centre. The area is adjacent to the Parkmore Industrial Estate as well as the Clayton Hotel and Briarhill Shopping centre.

Doughiska now has a primary and secondary school serving the area. Doughiska also has a park, several playing pitches, basketball and tennis court as well as a skateboard park. The area is also served by two hospitals with Merlin Park University Hospital to the west and the private Galway Clinic to the east of Doughiska.

The area also contains Merlin Park woods.

== Sport ==
Merlin Woods FC & Sports Club is located in the area. Doughiska is also in the catchment area of Castlegar GAA hurling club. Castlegar became the first club from west of the River Shannon to win a club All Ireland in 1980. The area is also home to St James' GAA club, which fields Gaelic football teams. Both clubs compete in the Galway Senior Club Championship. The area is also adjacent to Ballybrit racecourse, home of the Galway Races.

== Notable events ==
Pope John Paul II visited Ballybrit racecourse on 30 September 1979 during his visit to Ireland. There was a mass held for the young people of Ireland where the Pope famously said "Young people of Ireland, I love you". There were 280,000 people in attendance that day.

Doughiska has also hosted outdoor concerts for the Galway Arts Festival.
