= St James' GAA (Galway) =

Gaelic sports club in Galway, Ireland

St James'
- Naomh Séamus
- Founded: 1994
- County: Galway
- Nickname: The Jimmies
- Colours: Maroon & Green
- Grounds: Mervue & Renmore
- Coordinates: 53°17′00″N 9°00′50″W

Playing kits
Standard colours

St James' is a Gaelic games club based on the east side of Galway, a city in western Ireland. It is a member of the Galway GAA branch of the Gaelic Athletic Association. The club's catchment area covers the parishes of Renmore, Mervue, Ballybane and Good Shepard (Doughiska).

== History ==
The club was formed in 1994, when Renmore and Mervue GAA clubs amalgamated to cater for their adult football teams, and was initially called 'Mervue/Renmore'. In 1998, the club was renamed to St James'. The name St James' comes from the historic church and graveyard of St James, located approximately half-way between the Mervue GAA pitch and Renmore GAA pitch. Renmore and Mervue continued to compete separately at juvenile level, with Minor and U21 teams gradually being added, and in 2007 the clubs fully amalgamated. As the population of the surrounding areas grew, the catchment area subsequently spread to include Ballybane and Good Shepard (Doughiska) parishes.

Underage teams up to U-16's play in the Galway league and championships while they also compete at higher levels. The club won back to back Minor A County Championships in 2006 and 2007, as well as two Minor A West Board titles in the same years. They finished top of the Minor League in 2006.

At Intermediate level, the club narrowly missed out on the 2006 and 2009 county titles. Ultimately, in 2010, they won the Galway Intermediate Championship, beating An Spidéal in the final. They progressed to win the Connacht Club Intermediate Championship, and from there beat Gneevguilla of Kerry in the All-Ireland Intermediate Club semi-final in Mallow, County Cork. St James' faced Lisnaskea Emmets of Fermanagh in the All Ireland intermediate club football final in Croke Park, on 12 February 2011. They were narrowly beaten by 4 points, on a score line of 1-16 to 0-15.

The club has played in the Galway Senior Football Championship since 2011.

== Honours ==
- Connacht Intermediate Club Football Championship (1): 2010
- Galway Intermediate Football Championship (1): 2010
- Galway Minor Football Championship (3): 2006, 2007, 2009

== Notable players ==
- Eoin Concannon
- Paul Conroy, the 2024 All Star Footballer of the Year
- Johnny Duane
