= Earl of Eldon (1830 ship) =

UK merchant ship 1830–1834

History

United Kingdom
- Name: Earl of Eldon
- Namesake: Lord Eldon
- Owner: J. Barrie, Whitby
- Builder: J. Barrie, Whitby
- Launched: 1830
- Fate: Destroyed by fire at sea 1834

General characteristics
- Tons burthen: 513 (bm)
- Length: 119 ft 3 in (36.3 m)
- Beam: 31 ft 6 in (9.6 m)
- Propulsion: Sail
- Notes: Carvel built

Earl of Eldon was launched at Whitby in 1830 but registered in London. Her master was Captain E. Theaker and her owner was J. Barry. She first appeared in Lloyd's Register in 1830; in 1831 her trade was London-India. Spontaneous combustion that occurred in the cargo resulted in her destruction in 1834 in the Indian Ocean about 1,000 nautical miles (1,900 km; 1,200 mi) from Rodrigues Island at 10°S 77°E.

== Loss ==
Earl of Eldon departed Bombay on 24 August 1834, bound for London with many passengers and a cargo of cotton. Her cargo had been loaded into the ship's hold in a damp condition. What one passenger some time later believed was steam billowing from the hold turned out to be smoke. Within the hour, the deck was ablaze and by mid-afternoon, the entire vessel was in flames. Forty-five men, women and children and the crew took to three ship's boats to make their escape. After they had rowed for an hour, Earl of Eldon's powder-magazine exploded, causing the ship to disintegrate spectacularly.

On 10 October, after 13 days and a voyage of 450 miles at sea in open boats, all 45, including four women and an infant, arrived safely at Rodrigues. Lloyd's List reported on 20 January 1835 that Earl of Eldon had burnt at sea.
