= Yellow Pack =

European brand of generic groceries

Yellow Pack was a brand of generic groceries, first launched in March 1980 by Fine Fare, a British regional supermarket chain ultimately owned by the Weston family, whose extensive interests include the UK's Associated British Foods, Loblaw Companies in North America, and a range of upmarket retailers such as Selfridges, Brown Thomas and Fortnum & Mason.

Distinctively packaged in yellow with bold black print, under a brand name ("Yellow Price Packs") invented in January 1980 by the Collett Dickenson Pearce advertising agency, Yellow Packs, unlike previous generic grocery launches in North America and Europe, were positioned, next to an own-label range, as the cheapest version of the product concerned available in Britain.

In most cases, this involved product or packaging re-engineering, or uncovering of new sources. The range's colour scheme design was derived from the No Name brand of generics launched a year or two earlier by Fine Fare's Canadian sister grocery chain, Toronto-based Loblaws.

The Yellow Pack brand was reasonably successful, accounting for 30% of the chain's grocery sales by the time Fine Fare was acquired by the Dee Corporation – then mostly trading as Gateway, latterly Somerfield – in mid 1986. It was then discontinued in Great Britain.

In the meantime, after initial internal hostility to someone else's idea, the range was adopted by Fine fare's Irish sister company, Quinnsworth, where it featured heavily in advertising presented by Quinnsworth's advertising manager, Maurice Pratt. Whereas in Fine Fare's Scottish and Teesside heartland, Yellow Packs had merely been a successful product launch, they acquired a semi-iconic status in Ireland, and were extended throughout Quinnsworth's affiliate chains within the Power supermarket group (such as Stewarts and Crazy Prices in Northern Ireland and Crazy Prices in the Republic).

The term "Yellow Pack" became a generic term for cheap products or low-paid jobs in Ireland.

As a promotional offer, Quinnsworth started offering reduced-price flights to its customers. These were soon given the nickname Yellow Pack Flights.

In the mid 1990s, Power Supermarkets began to phase out the Yellow Pack brand, replacing them with two new brands. Budget products were branded "Five Star" (later "K.V.I" (Keenest Value in Ireland)), and a more upmarket "Premium Choice" brand created for higher quality goods. After the acquisition of the Irish business by Tesco, the brand was completely replaced by Tesco own-brands, including the similar in concept Tesco Value, using white rather than yellow packaging).

Tesco Value had been developed (as "Value Lines") in 1981, as Tesco's answer in Britain to Yellow Packs. Derived from the company's Victor Value chain, Tesco's Value range has, since the early 1980s played a consistent, though minor, role in Tesco's repertoire of private brands.
