= Kaliště =

Kaliště or Kalište may refer to places:

== Czech Republic ==
- Kaliště (Jihlava District), a municipality and village in the Vysočina Region
- Kaliště (Pelhřimov District), a municipality and village in the Vysočina Region
- Kaliště (Prague-East District), a municipality and village in the Central Bohemian Region
- Kaliště, a village and part of Bohdalovice in the South Bohemian Region
- Kaliště, a village and part of Dolní Hbity in the Central Bohemian Region
- Kaliště, a village and part of Nadějkov in the South Bohemian Region
- Kaliště, a village and part of Švihov (Klatovy District) in the Plzeň Region
- Kaliště, a village and part of Votice in the Central Bohemian Region
- Kaliště u Lipí, a village and part of Lipí in the South Bohemian Region

== Serbia ==
- Kalište, a village

== Slovakia ==
- Kalište (Slovakia), a former village
