= Bert Wiegman =

British private equity manager

- Born: Albert Edward Bernard Wiegman; March 1952 (age 74)
- Education: Rugby School
- Alma mater: University of Bristol
- Occupation: Private equity manager
- Known for: Founder and partner, Langholm Capital
- Spouse: Gail Wiegman

Albert Edward Bernard Wiegman (born March 1952) is a British private equity manager, founder and partner of Langholm Capital.

== Early life ==
Wiegman was educated at Carshalton College of Further Education, and the Manchester University.

== Langholm Capital ==
Under Wiegman, Langholm Capital's successful investments have included Just Retirement, Bart Spices, Dorset Cereals, Lumene, and Tyrrells.

Wiegman is the Renter Warden of the Worshipful Company of Wheelwrights.

== Personal life ==
Wiegman is married to Gail, and lives in London.
