= Chase Distillery =

British single-estate distillery

Chase Distilery, Ltd
- Company type: Private company limited by shares
- Industry: Distillery
- Founded: 2008
- Founder: William Chase
- Headquarters: Chase Farm, Rosemaund, Preston Wynne, Herefordshire, United Kingdom
- Area served: World Wide
- Key people: William Chase
- Products: Vodka; Gin; Cider
- Production output: 10,000 (bottles per week) (February 2016)
- Brands: Chase vodka Chase GB Extra Dry Gin; Williams Elegant Gin; Willy's Cider
- Owner: William Chase
- Website: chasedistillery.co.uk

Chase Distillery, Ltd. was a British single-estate distillery based at Chase Farm in Preston Wynne, Herefordshire, United Kingdom. William Chase, the former owner and founder of Tyrrells crisps, founded the family-run business in 2008. Using ingredients sourced on-site at Rosemaund Farm, the distillery focuses its production on potato vodka, gin and cider.

Chase Distillery won the "Best Vodka Award" at the San Francisco World Spirits Competition in 2010 for its Chase vodka.

The distillery was acquired by Diageo in 2021. The Chase Distillery site in Herefordshire was closed in January 2025 with production moving to Cameronbridge distillery in Fife, Scotland.

== Company history ==
On a trip to the US in 2004, Chase realised that he could use his potatoes to produce vodka. With this realisation, he decided to convert one of his barns into a distillery and purchase a large still. The first harvest occurred on 1 April 2008 and the first batch of vodka was produced in June of the same year. In late 2008, the company expanded its production to include gin. Today, Chase Distillery exports its products to 36 countries around the world, and since February 2016, it sells an average of 10,000 bottles per week.

On 26 October 2020 Diageo released a communication that it had acquired Chase Distillery.

== Production ==
=== Single-estate distillery ===
As a single-estate distillery, all spirits produced by Chase Distillery are made using home-grown ingredients. Chase Vodka, for example, is made from King Edward and Lady Claire potatoes sourced straight from Rosemaund Farm. Williams Gin is made from the fermentation of organic cider apples grown in the on-site orchard.

=== Chase Vodka ===
Chase Vodka (40% abv) is the only potato-based vodka produced in England. In 2010, it won "Best Vodka Award" at the San Francisco World Spirits Competition.

Other vodka products made by Chase Distillery include:

- Naked Chase Apple Vodka (42% abv)
- Marmalade Vodka (40% abv)
- Chase Rhubarb Vodka (40% abv)
- Chase Smoked Vodka (40% abv)
- Chase Brandy Cask Aged Vodka (40% abv)

=== Chase Gin ===
Introduced in 2008, both Chase GB & Williams Elegant Gin is the UK's only single-estate gin. Its two main variants are Williams Elegant Gin (48% abv) and Chase GB Extra Dry Gin (40% abv). In 2013, it was named one of The Daily Telegraph's "best new gins".

First produced in 2008, Williams Elegant Gin is a clear, non-vintage, un-aged gin distilled from apple spirits. It contains a blend of 11 botanicals, including juniper, coriander seeds, liquorice, lemon and orange peels, hops, elderflower and Bramley apples, among others. Launched in Spain in 2012, Chase GB Extra Dry Gin uses Chase Vodka as its base. To create the gin, the vodka is infused with juniper buds and berries, along with 10 botanicals including cinnamon, nutmeg, ginger, almond, coriander, liquorice and lemon. In 2016, it won a Double Gold Award at the San Francisco World Spirits Competition.

Other gin products made by Chase Distillery include:

- Chase Sloe and Mulberry Gin (29% abv)
- Chase Seville Orange Gin (40% abv)

=== Maison Williams Chase Wines ===
Since 2012 Chase Distillery has also been producing wines at Chateau Constantin, a 40-hectare (99-acre) estate near Aix-en-Provence, France.

Willy's Cider, first produced in 2009, serves as the base for Williams Gins and has been bottled as a product in its own right since 2013. The distillery also produces Willy's Cider Apple Sours.

=== Further products ===
From 2014, together with Hobsons Brewery in Shropshire, Chase was developing a whisky made from corn, rye, or barley. They have been laying casks since 2012 and a cask distilled on 7 March 2012 was spotted in 2018.

== See also ==
- Chase Vodka
- William Chase
- Tyrrells (crisps)
