= Kallos =

Kallos, Kallós, and Kalloś may refer to:

== People ==
- Ashley Kallos, Canadian curler
- Ben Kallos, American lawyer and politician
- Ede Kallós, Hungarian sculptor
- Garry Kallos (born 1956), Canadian wrestler and sambo competitor
- Sándor Kallós, Ukrainian composer

== Other uses ==
- Kalište (Slovakia) (Hungarian: Kallós), a former village

== See also ==
- Kallø, a brand name of Royal Wessanen
- Kallósd, a village in Zala County, Hungary
- Renata Kallosh (born 1943), theoretical physicist
