= PDP London =

British architectural firm

Studio PDP, formerly known as Paul Davis + Partners or PDP London, is an architectural practice based in the UK, founded in 1994. Chairman Paul Davis retired from the practice as chairman in 2013, with the other 10 partners continuing to lead. Its head office is at Eccleston Yards, London. In recent years it has expanded, opening an office in Hong Kong in 2011 and offices in Bath and Madrid in 2018.

It has been on the Architects' Journal AJ 100 list of the top 100 UK practices since 2012, winning the awards for Practice of the Year and Sustainable Practice of the Year, while also being highly commended in the categories for Fastest Growing Practice and International Practice of the Year.

== Notable projects ==
- Cambridge House Hotel, formerly premises of the In and Out Club, London
- 3-10 Grosvenor Crescent, London
- Park Lane for the Dorchester Collection, London
- Code 5 Housing Project, Carryduff, Belfast
- 100 Princedale Road, London
- Duke of York Square, London
- The Westminster Terrace, Hong Kong
- Saatchi Gallery, London
- Cadogan Hall, London
- St George's Church Tufnell Park, London

== Sustainability ==
The practice has a close collaboration with Eight Associates, who focus on the delivery of BREEAM-accredited sustainable buildings.

In 2010, Studio PDP completed work on the refurbishment of a social housing project (100 Princedale Road) to Passivhaus standards, reducing CO_{2} emissions by 83% and using 94% less energy. Described by the founder of Passivhaus as "one of the most advanced worldwide," it won the award for best small housing project at the AJ Retrofit Awards 2012.
