= Ryvita =

British brand of rye crispbread

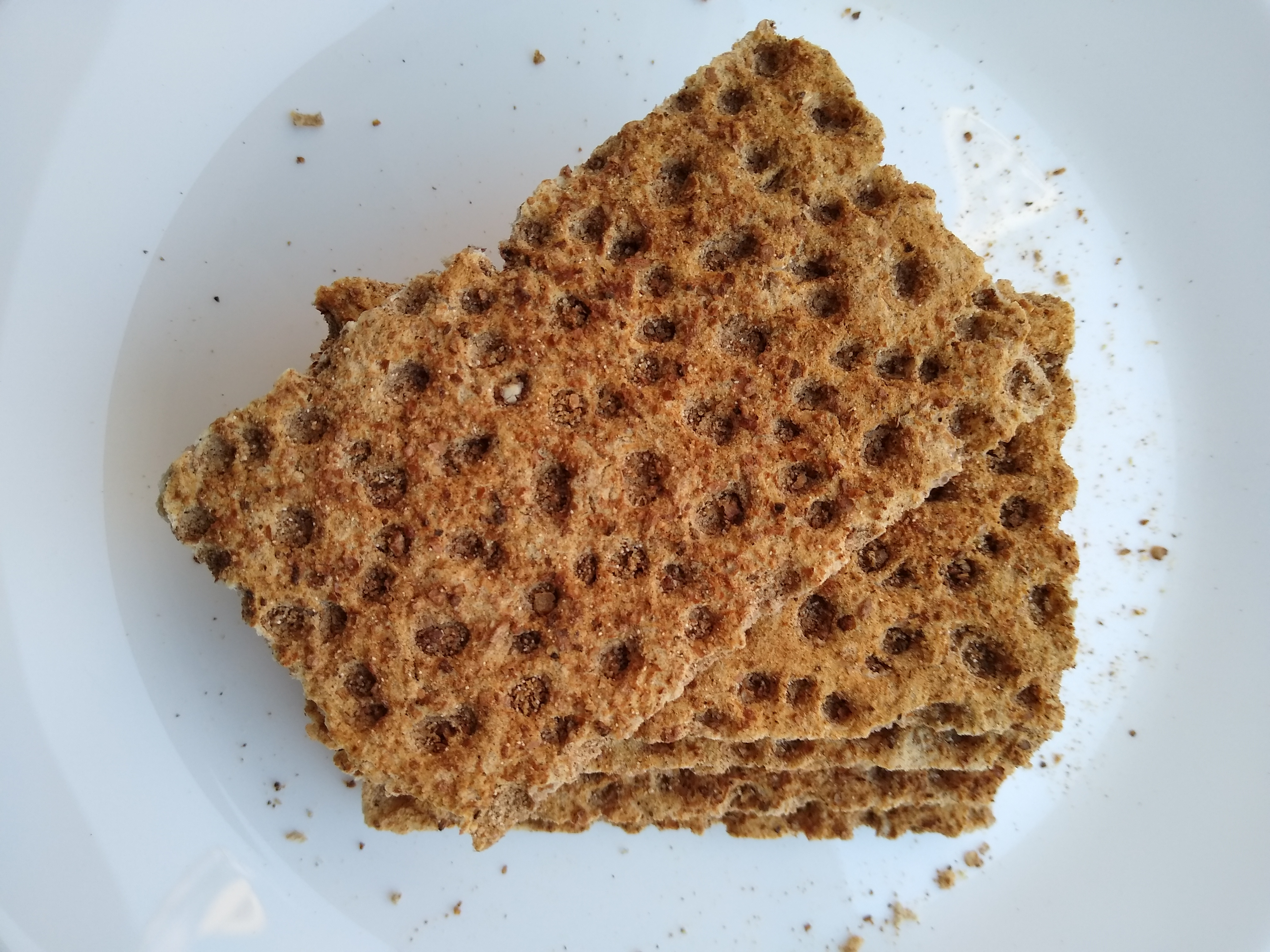
- “Dark Rye" Ryvita
- Type: Rye-based Crispbread
- Place of origin: Birmingham, England
- Created by: John Edwin Garratt

Ryvita is a brand of rye crispbread from Great Britain. The brand started in the 1920s and has been owned by Associated British Foods (ABF) since 1949. Today Ryvita products are manufactured and sold by Jordans Dorset Ryvita, a subsidiary of ABF.

== Products ==
The Ryvita range includes varieties of baked products that the company calls crispbreads, crackerbreads and thins, some with adjuncts such as dried fruit and seeds and some using other grain flours, such as wheat.

== History ==
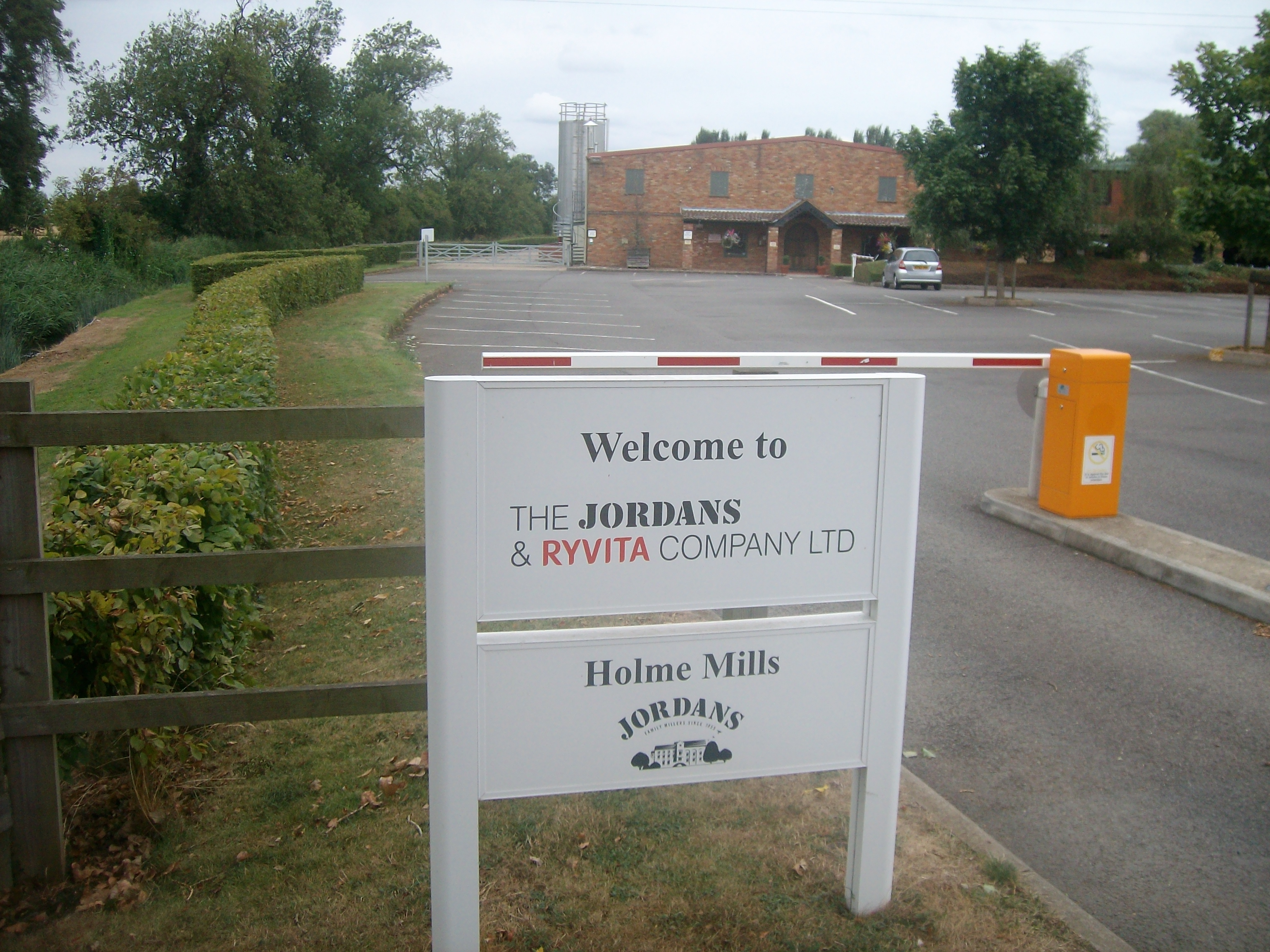
Ryvita and Jordans factory in Biggleswade, Bedfordshire

The Ryvita company was founded in 1925 by John Edwin Garratt. It initially imported rye crispbreads from Scandinavia but in 1932 started production in Birmingham in England.

The Ryvita factory was destroyed during the Second World War and replaced in 1949 by a new production facility in Poole in Dorset, a port on the south coast of England.

In 1949, the company was acquired by Associated British Foods (ABF). It is currently part of ABF subsidiary Jordans Dorset Ryvita, that also produces cereal-based foods under the Jordans and Dorset Cereals brand names.

The company held royal warrants as manufacturers of crispbreads, granted by King George VI and by Queen Elizabeth II.

== See also ==
- Ry-Krisp
