= William Chase (entrepreneur) =

British entrepreneur

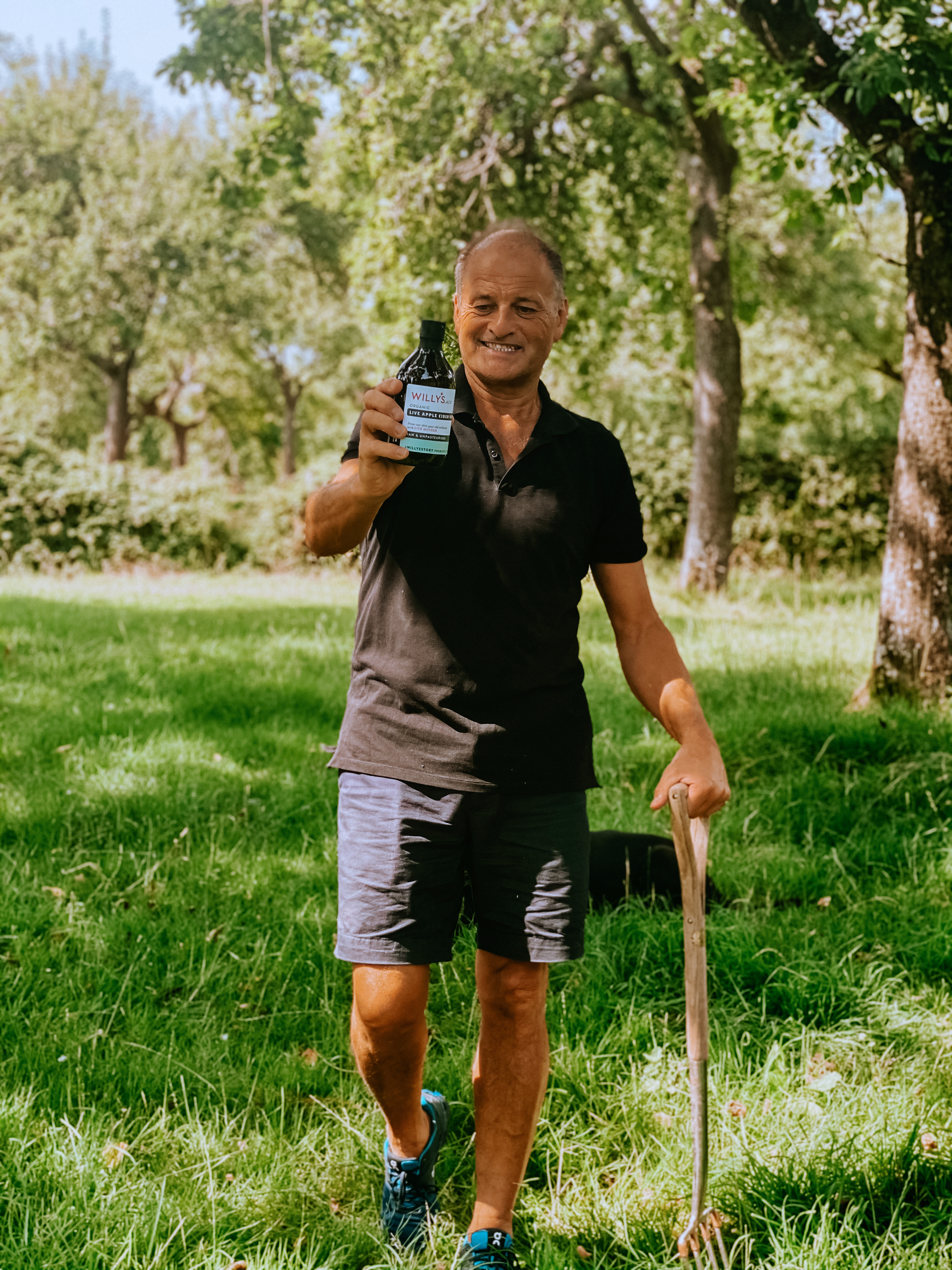
- Chase in his Herefordshire apple orchards
- Born: Herefordshire, West Midlands, England
- Occupation: Entrepreneur
- Years active: 1980–present
- Children: James Chase; Harry Chase; Austin Chase; Thomas Chase

William Chase is an English entrepreneur. He is the founder of the Tyrrells Potato Chips brand and Chase Distillery, Ltd. that produces Chase Vodka and Williams Gin and more recently Willy's Probiotic Live Foods that produces fermented foods and drinks.

== Early life ==
Chase grew up on his family's farm, Tyrrells Court, near Dilwyn in Herefordshire. Having purchased the farm from his father at the age of 20 with a bank loan of £200,000, a poor potato harvest and high interest rates forced him to declare bankruptcy in 1992. He then re-established his business and began trading in potatoes to generate additional income.

== Tyrrells ==
In 2002, Chase launched Tyrrells: a crisp brand made from potato varieties grown on his farm, including Lady Rosetta and Golden Wonder. Chase initially favoured upmarket outlets such as Fortnum & Mason, Selfridges and Harrods, and independent retailers over mass-market sellers, notably by forcing Tesco to cease stocking the product in 2006. Turnover reached £14 million by 2008, when he sold a majority stake in the firm to investment company Langholm Capital for £30 million.

== Chase Distillery ==
Chase invested the proceeds from the sale of equity in Tyrrells to found the Chase Distillery, Ltd. in 2008. Initially, the distillery focused exclusively on producing high-quality potato vodka from potatoes grown on site. The construction of an exceptionally tall 70 ft rectification column enabled Chase Vodka to be distilled up to 119 times. Chase Vodka sales totalled £140,000 in the first year and the brand quickly achieved success on the export market. Chase gradually developed and brought new products to market including fruit liqueurs (notably Chase Elderflower Liqueur) and flavoured vodkas (e.g. Chase Marmalade Vodka and Chase Smoked English Oak Vodka).

Chase Distillery was also responsible for the production of Williams Gin, which uses Chase Vodka as its base spirit. The alcohol is then infused with botanicals using a traditional carter head style still to create a range of products including Williams Elegant Gin, Williams Sloe and Mulberry Gin, Chase Eureka Citrus Gin and Williams Seville Orange Gin.

Chase Distillery was acquired by Diageo on March 1, 2021 for an undisclosed amount.

== Selladore En Provence (formerly Williams Chase Wines) ==
As of 2016, the Chase Distillery forms part of the Williams Chase brand. Maison Williams Chase wines are cultivated at the Château Saint Jean de villecroze in the French Provence region.

== Willy's ACV - Organic Probiotic Live Foods ==
In 2014, William Chase launched Willy's ACV.

== Popcorn ==
In 2016 he launched Willy Chase's Fit Corn.
