= Jordans (cereal) =

British cereal foods manufacturer

- Industry: Food manufacturing
- Founded: 1855
- Founder: Richard Brown
- Fate: Merged in 2009 with the Ryvita Company, a subsidiary of Associated British Foods
- Successor: The Jordans & Ryvita Company Limited
- Headquarters: Biggleswade, Bedfordshire, England, United Kingdom
- Products: Breakfast cereals Cereal bars
- Number of employees: 400
- Website: jordanscereals.co.uk

Jordans is a British manufacturer of breakfast cereals and cereal bars. It is part of Jordans Dorset Ryvita, a subsidiary of Associated British Foods, that also encompasses Dorset Cereals and Ryvita crispbreads.

== History ==
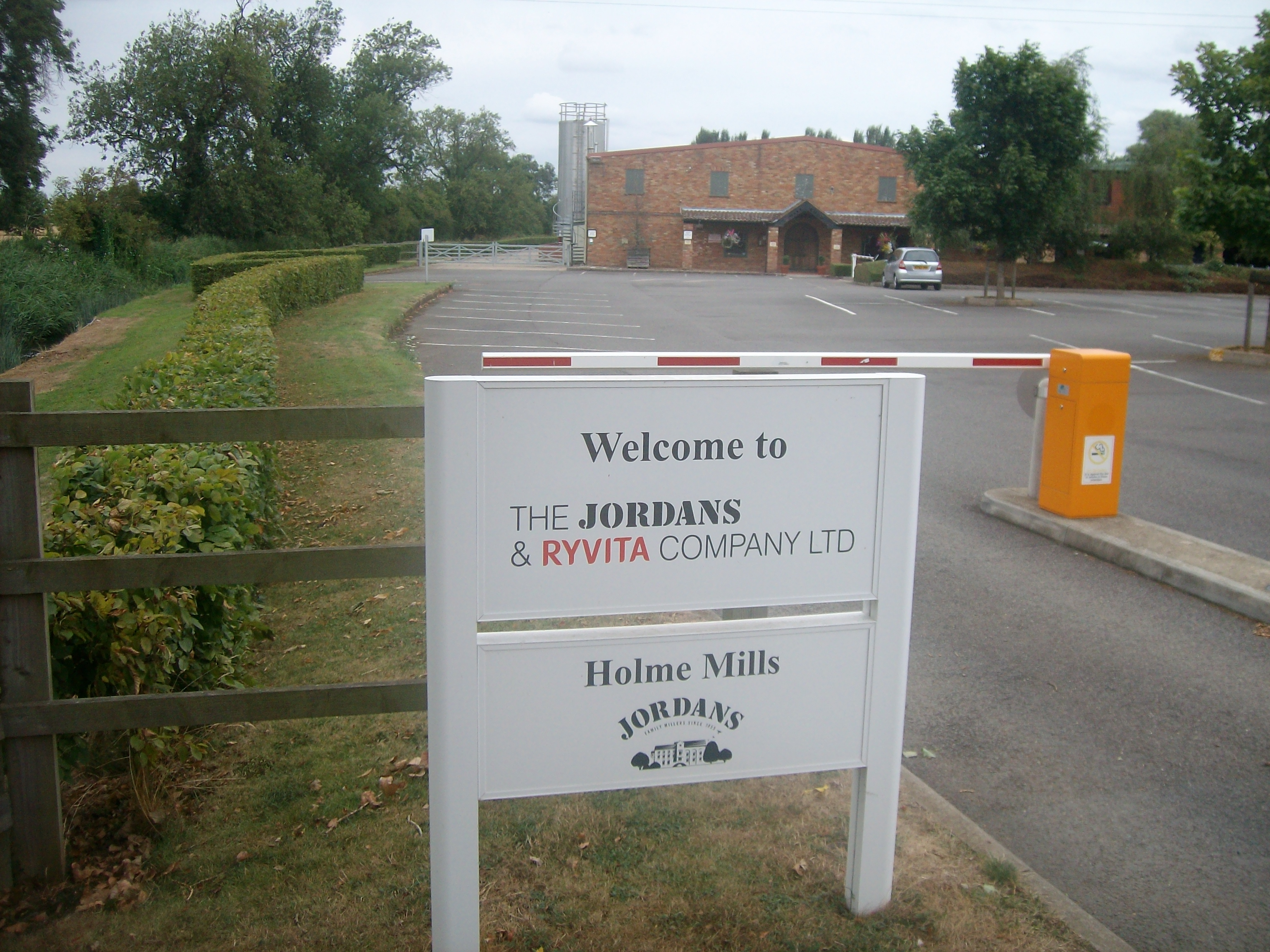
Holme Mills centre

In 1855, farmer William Herbert Jordan bought Holme Mills in Biggleswade, Bedfordshire, England. The mills produced flour until 1970. In 1972 the mill owners, brothers Bill and David Jordan, founded Jordans Cereals to produce granola, which they had discovered in California.

Their initial product was granola. In 1981, Jordans began production of a granola bar.

From 2002 to 2006 Jordans and Yeo Valley Organic backed the Organic and Natural Food Company, a startup that produced 'Green Machine' vending machines in UK schools that offered healthy foods to pupils and staff.

In April 2003, the company won a Queen's Awards for Enterprise.

Bill Jordan became an MBE in the 2005 New Year Honours for services to the food and drink industries.

In September 2007, 20% of the company was sold to Associated British Foods, followed by a further 42% in June 2008, becoming fully owned by ABF by 2013.

== Conservation efforts ==
The company campaigns against the rapid decline in the bee population. Its Big Buzz campaign was launched in May 2009 in collaboration with the British Beekeepers' Association and the Bumblebee Conservation Trust.

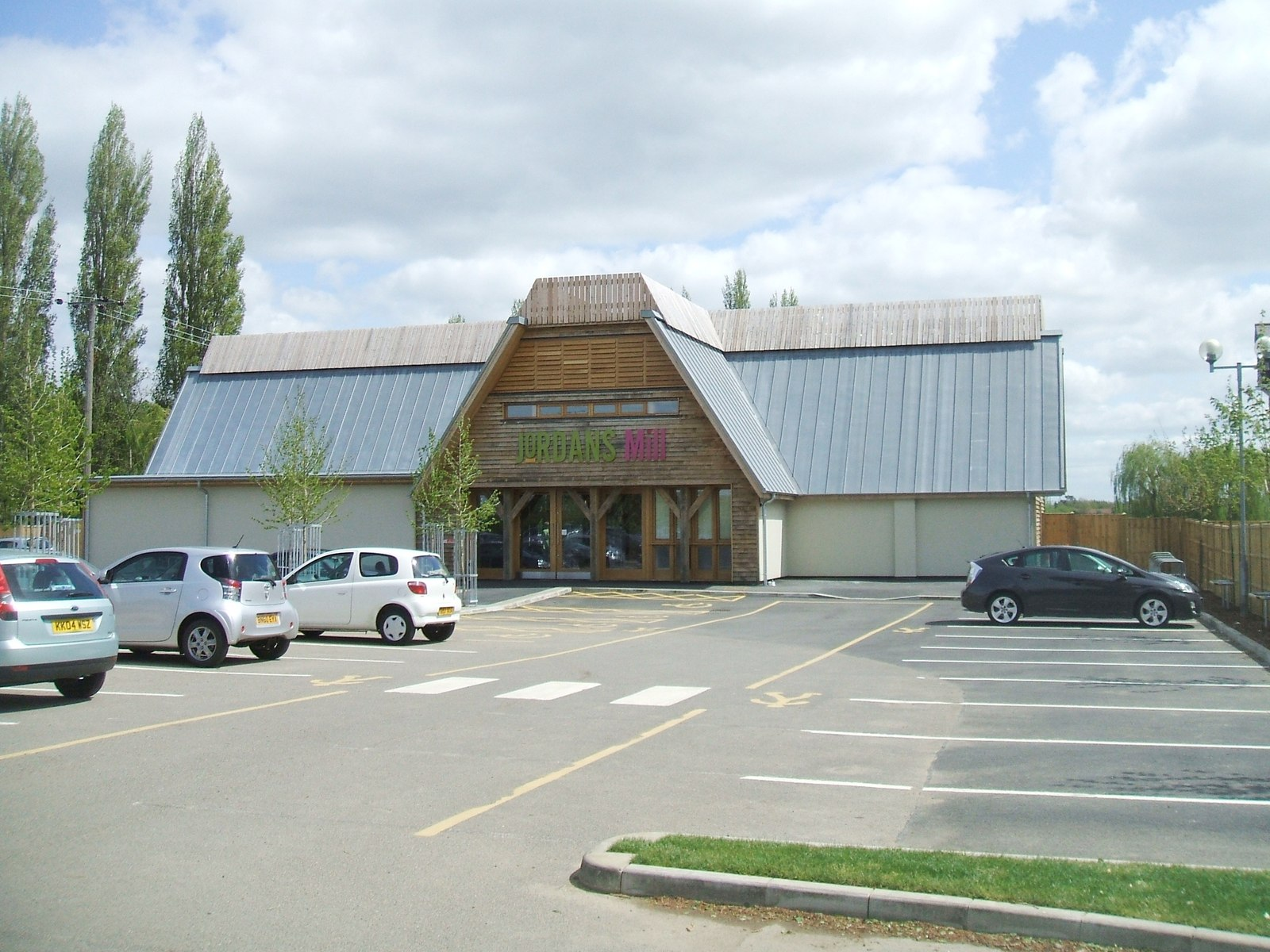
Jordans Mill Visitor Centre

== Market share ==
Jordans is the UK's fourth largest cereals manufacturer after Kelloggs, Nestlé and Weetabix.

Jordans belongs to the Association of Cereal Food Manufacturers, which is a member of the European Breakfast Cereal Association.

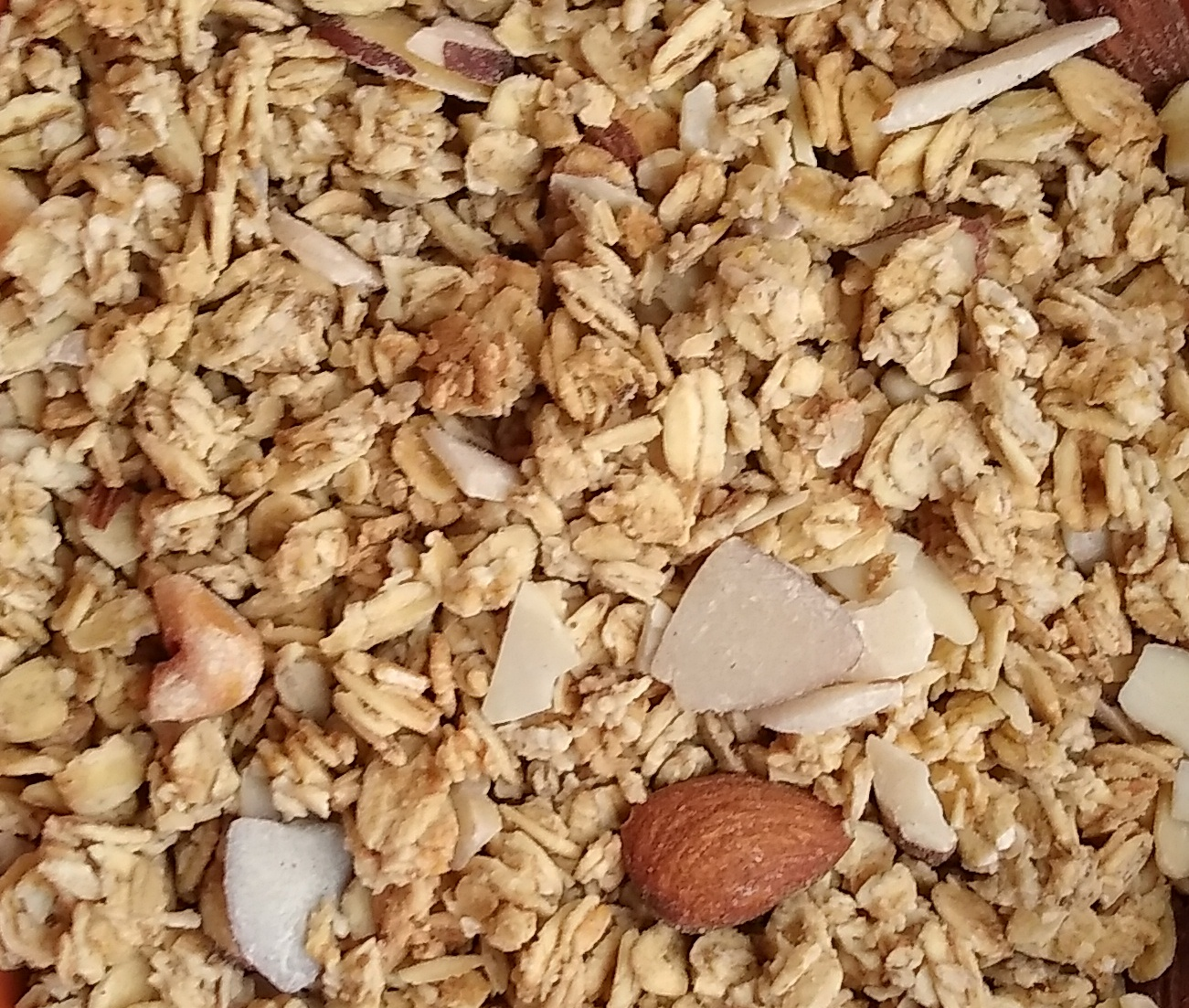
Super Nutty Granola
