= Lipi =

Lipi may refer to:

== People ==
- Bruno Lipi (born 1994), Albanian football player
- Syeda Zakia Noor Lipi, Bangladesh politician
- Tayeba Begum Lipi (born 1969), Bangladeshi artist

== Places ==
- Lipí, Czech Republic

== Other ==
- LIPI, the short form of Lembaga Ilmu Pengetahuan Indonesia (Indonesian for 'Indonesian Institute of Sciences')
- Lipi (script)
