= Bold Scandinavia =

Swedish marketing agency

- Industry: Branding agency
- Founded: 2011
- Founders: Oskar Lübeck; Carl-Fredrik af Sandeberg
- Headquarters: Stockholm, Sweden
- Number of locations: 4 (Stockholm, Copenhagen, Oslo, London)
- Number of employees: 80 (2026)
- Parent: The North Alliance (NoA)
- Website: boldscandinavia.com

Bold Scandinavia is a Swedish brand and design consultancy company with studios in Stockholm, Copenhagen, Oslo and London. Founded in Stockholm in 2011 by Oskar Lübeck and Carl-Fredrik af Sandeberg, the agency employs approximately 80 people as of 2025 and is a member of The North Alliance (NoA), a Nordic creative and technology group.

The agency's services span brand management and design, digital experience, motion identity, verbal identity, audio identity, typeface design, research and brand activation. Bold's notable projects have included brand identities for Mojang Studios, the video game franchise Minecraft, the Eurovision Song Contest 2024, Stegra (formerly H2 Green Steel), and Nordiska Museet.

== History ==
Bold was founded in Stockholm in 2011 by Oskar Lübeck and Carl-Fredrik af Sandeberg. In 2014, Bold joined The North Alliance, a Nordic group of agencies working in marketing, technology and innovation. The agency subsequently expanded beyond its original Stockholm location, opening studios in Copenhagen, Oslo and later London.

== Recognition ==
In 2025, Bold was named a finalist for Global Brand Agency of the Year by Campaign magazine. In 2021, Bold NoA (Stockholm) received the Regional Design Company of the Year award for Europe at the London International Awards. Bold has received gold in the Strategic Design category at the Swedish Effie Awards (100-wattaren) in both 2023 and 2024, a Gold Lion at Cannes Lions for its Minecraft identity, and a Grand Prix at Eurobest. Bold's work has also been recognised at the Red Dot Design Awards, the Epica Awards, and the Pentawards.
