= Perry Haydn Taylor =

British designer and entrepreneur (born 1966)

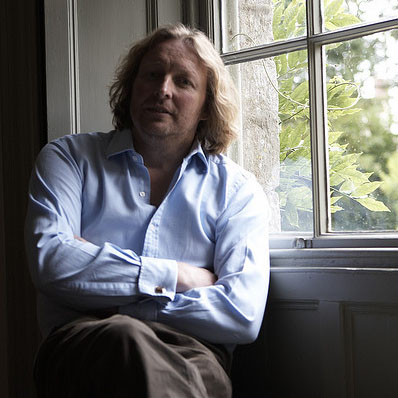
- Haydn Taylor in 2001
- Born: 21 June 1966 (age 60)
- Occupations: Founder and Chief stoker of Big Fish
- Years active: 1994–present
- Spouse: Vik Haydn Taylor
- Children: 3 daughters: Perpetua, Helvetica and Clarendon
- Website: bigfish.co.uk

Perry Haydn Taylor (born 1966) is an English creative director, designer and entrepreneur, who lives in Somerset and works in London. He is the founder of big fish a branding design and marketing consultancy.

== Career ==
Haydn Taylor founded Big Fish in 1994, and its clients have included British brands such as Yeo Valley Organic, Dorset Cereals, and Sipsmith. Haydn Taylor was consultant Creative Director for both Gü and Boden. He is also a shareholder and advisor for Boden. He has invested in and helped to start Sofa.com, Biscuiteers, Cornishware, The Coconut Collaborative, Katherine Hooker, Tom&Co, Chesil Smokery, Alma de Cuba, Tiba Tempeh, GrowUp Vertical Farms, Howdah Snacks and Pooky, a decorative lighting brand.

He was part of the startup team for Sofa.com, branding and designing the website at big fish. He cites it as "the most challenging and most successful digital project I've ever worked on". Between 1998 and 2003 Lauren Child worked for big fish whilst creating her early works, and includes Taylor in the dedications of her books. He has three daughters, each named after a different typeface: Perpetua, Helvetica and Clarendon.

== Awards and recognition ==
- Pentawards: Clipper Teas
- Design Week Award: Gü
- Design Week commendation: Dorset Cereals

In 2009, Haydn Taylor was a member of the jury for the Design and Art Direction (D&AD) design awards.
