= Den Norske Klub =

English social club for Norwegian expatriates

Coordinates: 51°30′29.31″N 0°8′5.25″W

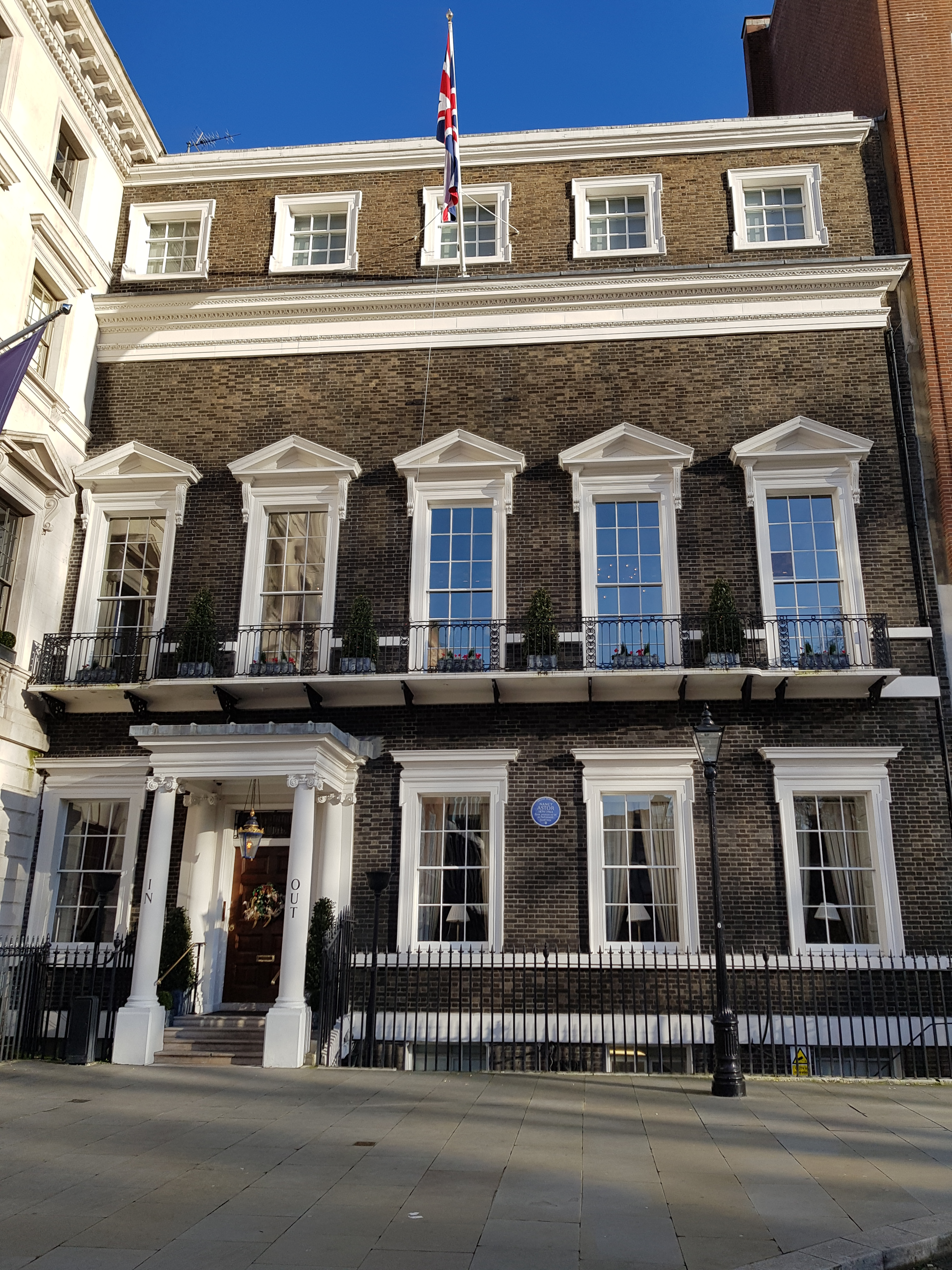
- The Naval and Military Club premises shared with Den Norske Klub
- Formation: 1887
- Headquarters: Since 1999
- Location: 4 St. James's Square
- Affiliations: Norwegian expatriates
- Website: dennorskeklub.co.uk

Den Norske Klub (The Norwegian Club, or DNK) is a social club based in London. It was founded on 17 May 1887. Its members are Norwegians living in London or Britons with a connection to or interest in Norway. It is the oldest club of its kind in the UK and is still an important meeting place for the Norwegian community in London.

As a result of DNK's long existence and extensive networks, DNK attracts high calibre speakers and guests to its events including royals, celebrities, business leaders, and members of parliament.

== History ==
=== Early years ===
The Klub owes its existence to a dozen young Norwegians who were celebrating their national day (17 May) in a bar in 1887. When, at closing time, they were told they could stay only if they were representing a private club, one of the participants had the presence of mind to declare, "Well, we represent the Norwegian Club in London." They jotted down some articles of association on a piece of paper, which they all signed, and that allowed them to carry on drinking: Den Norske Klub was born.

The first meetings took place every Thursday evening in a pub and the membership fee was fixed at 1 shilling per month. Most of the members were men in their 20s who had come to London to study or to train as businessmen, particularly in shipping, and only stayed in London a few years. The resident Norwegian colony, including the older gentlemen, were at first sceptical of the Klub but became involved after about 1900. In these early years, membership varied between 20-odd and about 50 members. Today it is around 300.

Women were originally only admitted as guests at Klub dinners and balls, but gained the right to become members in 1982.

=== Second World War (1939–1945) ===
For the first few decades, the Klub held its meetings and dances at hotels, inns, and pubs in central locations around London. This changed in 1924, when DNK moved to Norway House, in Cockspur Street, off Trafalgar Square, occupying the top three floors. This building came to play an important role during the Second World War, when many Norwegian institutions and government bodies were housed there. King Haakon VII and the members of his Norwegian government-in-exile became regular visitors to the Klub.

=== Royal patronage ===
King Haakon VII became DNK's first patron. His son, King Olav V, was honorary president from 1957 until his death in 1991. Princess Märtha Louise of Norway is an honorary member, as was her father the late king Harald V.

== Today ==
In 1997, Norway House was sold and, following a brief period sharing the premises of the Danish Club, the DNK moved in 2000 to the Naval and Military Club (also known as the In & Out) at 4, St James's Square, in the heart of London's "clubland". It continues to share a building, and to work in close cooperation, with the Naval and Military Club.
