= Clipper Teas =

British fairtrade tea company

Clipper Tea
- Industry: Fairtrade Tea
- Founded: 1984
- Founder: Lorraine and Mike Brehme
- Headquarters: Beaminster, Dorset, United Kingdom
- Area served: International
- Products: Tea, organic tea, hot chocolate, coffee
- Owner: Royal Wessanen
- Number of employees: 90 (2012)
- Website: www.clipper-teas.com

Clipper is a British Fairtrade tea company based in Beaminster, Dorset, founded in 1984. In 1994, it was one of the first companies in the UK to receive the Fairtrade Mark. Clipper was purchased in 2012 by Royal Wessanen (now Ecotone) for around £50 million.

== History ==
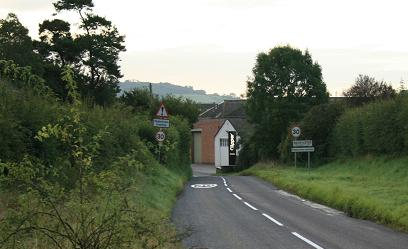
Clipper factory, Beaminster

Clipper Tea was started in 1984 by Lorraine and Mike Brehme. Already being in the tea industry, they cited increased amounts of child labour in the trade as their original motive to found Clipper.

Clipper Tea started in the couple's Dorset kitchen with two chests of Assam tea, which they bought for £50 and sold to local health food shops in the Dorset area. Their product approach was "always a pure, natural product – there isn't a single artificial ingredient in any of our products".

The couple divorced, and in 2007 they sold to Fleming Family & Partners, a fund backed by one of Britain's wealthiest families, for around £25–£30 million.

In 2008, Perry Haydn Taylor's creative branding agency was approached to rebrand the business. They created new Clipper packaging and the slogan "Natural, fair & delicious".

In 2012, the business was sold Royal Wessanen which is now a multinational named Ecotone, headquartered in France and owned by private equity. Creative branding agencies continued to work with the brand. Exports grew by 40% in 2012 and the manufacturing facility in Beaminster was expanded with capital investment.

In 2022, Clipper was the UK's sixth biggest tea brand and its tea was exported to over 50 countries.

Clipper produces 95 varieties of tea with up to two million tea bags made per day.

In Germany, Spain, Italy, Lithuania and Czech Republic the brand is called Cupper Tea because another tea brand had already registered the brand name "Clipper" in Germany.

== Ethics ==
Clipper was founded as an ethical alternative to other teas, and advocates Fairtrade and organic tea.

Clipper became involved with the Fairtrade Foundation in its earliest stages and policy development.

All of Clipper's tea is purchased from estates where there is no exploitation of workers.

In 1994, Clipper was one of the first three companies in the UK to receive the Fairtrade mark and then decided to produce a magazine, called The Teapot Times, about the history of tea production and the positive impact buying Fairtrade goods had on communities around the world. Clipper also became official advisors to the Fairtrade Foundation for tea.
