= Biscuiteers =

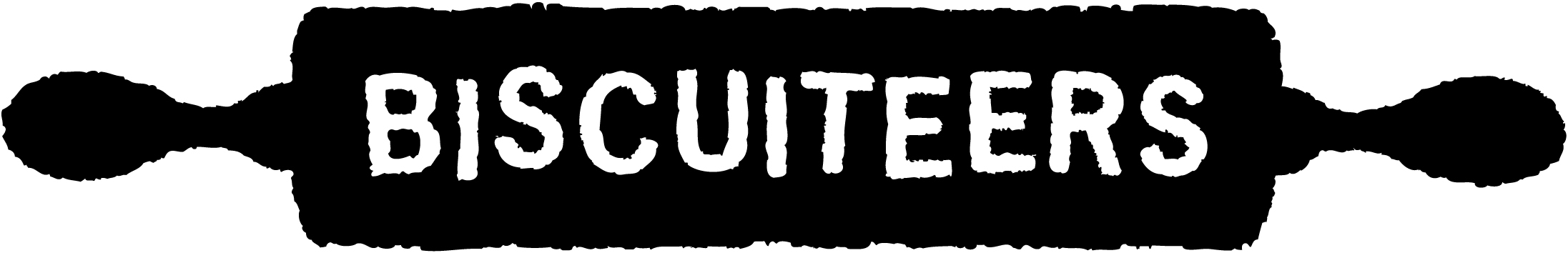
- Industry: retail
- Founded: 2007
- Headquarters: London, United Kingdom
- Number of locations: 2 London cafés (2024)
- Key people: Harriet Hastings; Stevie Congdon
- Website: Official website

Biscuiteers, also known as Biscuiteer Baking Company, is a British gifting retailer, specialising in hand-iced biscuits, chocolates and cakes. The business was started online in 2007 by husband and wife team Harriet Hastings and Stevie Congdon, delivering to both the UK and internationally. Biscuiteers also offers a bespoke and corporate service. The company was in the Real Business top 50 in 2011 and was named as one of the Accelerate 250 fastest growing British companies of 2013. Biscuiteers iced more than 2 million biscuits and dispatched to over 100 countries in 2018. All of the biscuits are made in their kitchens in London.

== History ==
Harriet Hastings co-founded Biscuiteers with her husband, Stevie Congdon in 2007. Hastings had just left her job as Director of Consumer Brands at Trimedia following the birth of her fourth child and was keen to create her own e-commerce brand. She saw an opportunity in food gifting in the UK and developed the idea of iced biscuits for their flexibility in design, shelf life and postability. Biscuiteers launched with a small range of designs called collections like the fashion world. For the first 5 years the brand sold online at Biscuiteers.com and to corporate and wholesale clients including Selfridges and Harrods. In 2012 the business opened their first Icing Café in Notting Hill, and their second Icing Café on the Northcote Road followed in 2014. In September 2017, the brand celebrated their 10th birthday with London's very first 'biscuit exhibition' at the Serpentine Gallery, a retrospective look at the company's past decade, represented by 10 intricate, 3D biscuit structures made from biscuit.

== Products ==
Biscuiteers receive corporate commissions such as logos and other designs for iced biscuits and cakes and have previously created bespoke biscuits for Anya Hindmarch, Mulberry, Boden, Swatch, Dior, Cartier, Gucci, Red Bull and Burberry among others, where they wanted very accurate representations of their designs. They also have a bespoke service for private parties, weddings, christenings, baby showers and birthday parties.

Biscuiteers products are stocked in Selfridges, Fenwicks, Harrods, Harvey Nichols, Le Bon Marche and Saint Laurent in Paris amongst others.

In September 2019, Biscuiteers unveiled a new purpose-built space known as the “Ministry of Biscuits” in the Wimbledon district of London which produces millions of hand-iced biscuits a year.

== Icing Cafes ==
The “Biscuiteers Boutique & Icing Café” on Kensington Park Road, Notting Hill opened its doors in 2012.

The company's second icing café opened on Northcote Road in Battersea in 2014. However, this café relocated to a larger, more central, location in Belgravia in November 2021. Biscuiteers' new flagship icing café in Eccleston Yards, Belgravia, serves as a hub for a lot of their events, including Icing Lates, School of Icing and their Prosecco bar.

The Biscuiteers' Icing Cafes have been named as one of 'London's quirkiest cafes' by the Telegraph and included in Vogue as 'The Most Instagrammable Places in London' roundup.

== Biscuiteers Books ==
Biscuiteers first book, “Biscuiteers Book of Iced Biscuits” by Harriet Hastings and Sarah Moore was published by Kyle Books in 2012. Their second book, “Biscuiteers Book of Iced Gifts” by Harriet Hastings was published by Michael Joseph (Publisher) in 2018.

== Crowdfunding ==
In October 2016 Biscuiteers embarked on a round of crowdfunding with crowdfunding platform Crowdcube. In total the business raised a total of £1.2 million. During the crowdfunding process Biscuiteers were awarded a top score of three gold medals from independent crowdfunding guide Crowdrating. This identified Biscuiteers as a strong investment opportunity.
