= Langholm Capital =

British private equity firm

- Company type: Private
- Industry: Private equity
- Founded: 2002
- Headquarters: 2nd Floor, 17 Waterloo Place; London, SW1; United Kingdom
- Key people: Bert Wiegman (founder and partner); Alistair Bird (partner)

Langholm Capital is a London-based private equity firm.

Langholm Capital was founded in 2002, and is based at 2nd Floor, 17 Waterloo Place, London.

Their investments have included Bart Spices, Dorset Cereals, Lumene, and Tyrrells. In July 2013, Langholm sold Tyrells to Investcorp for £100 million.

The partners are Bert Wiegman, who founded the company, and Alistair Bird.
