= CapMan =

Finnish private equity fund manager

CapMan Oyj
- Type: Julkinen osakeyhtiö
- Traded as: Nasdaq Helsinki: CAPMAN
- Headquarters: Helsinki, Finland
- Key people: Pia Kåll, CEO; Joakim Frimodig, Chair
- Revenue: 67.5 million euros (2022)
- Operating income: 55.7 million euros (2022)
- Number of employees: 186 (2022)
- Website: www.capman.com

CapMan Oyj, founded in 1989 and headquartered in Helsinki, Finland, is a Finnish private equity fund manager listed in Helsinki Stock Exchange. CapMan manages funds with capital raised mainly from European institutional investors, such as pension funds and insurance companies, endowments, family offices, funds of funds and public institutions. CapMan has three key investment areas – Private Equity, Real Estate and Infrastructure. Altogether, CapMan employs around 190 professionals in Helsinki, Stockholm, Copenhagen, Oslo, Luxembourg and London.

== History ==
In 2014, during CapMan's 25th anniversary, a book called "Into the driver's seat - Stories about entrepreneurs and CapMan" was written by journalist Marko Erola from Talouselämä magazine.

== Investment areas ==
CapMan has three key investment areas - Private Equity, Real Estate, and Infrastructure - each of which has its own dedicated investment teams and funds.

- Private Equity includes CapMan Buyout, which invests in unlisted Nordic mid-market companies in various industries; CapMan Growth, which makes minority investments in Nordic growth companies; CapMan Special Situations, which invests in turnarounds and restructurings, and CapMan Credit, which invests in private debt.
- Real Estate manages private equity real estate funds and mandates, which invest in office, retail, residential and hotel properties, in the Nordic countries.
- Infra invests in Nordic mid-cap infrastructure assets, focusing on energy, transportation and digital communications assets.

== Investments ==
Targets for CapMan's investment partnerships are mainly Nordic unlisted companies, real estate and infrastructure assets.

In December 2012, CapMan became a signatory of the UN Principles for Responsible Investment (UN PRI).

Over the years, CapMan has made investments in dozens of different companies, amongst others Norled, Cederroth, Esperi Care, Design-Talo, Lumene, Kämp Group, The North Alliance, Walki, Komas Ltd, LämpöLux and Havator Group.

CapMan has Euro 5 billion of capital under management.

== Ownership ==
Half of CapMan's shares are owned by Finnish households. The largest owner is Silvertärnan Ab. Other large shareholders include Ilmarinen Mutual Pension Insurance Company, Varma Mutual Pension Insurance Company and The State Pension Fund. Approximately four per cent is owned by management.
