= Ecotone (company) =

French multinational food company

- Type: Société par actions simplifiée
- Industry: Food processing
- Founded: 1765
- Founder: Adriaan Wessanen, Dirk Laan
- Headquarters: Lyon, France
- Key people: Christophe Barnouin (CEO); Frans Koffrie (Chairman of the supervisory board); Ronald Merckx (CFO)
- Products: Natural, vegetarian, organic foods
- Revenue: €706 million (2011)
- Net income: ▼ (€17.1 million) (2011)
- Total assets: €368.0 million (end 2011)
- Total equity: €166.1 million (end 2011)
- Number of employees: 1,998 (FTE, end 2011)
- Website: www.ecotone.bio

Ecotone (formerly Royal Wessanen) is a French multinational food company with a focus on organic, founded in the Netherlands and headquartered in France since November 2020. It has operations in Europe and North America. Worldwide it had approx 2,000 employees at the end of 2011, a year in which it reported a revenue of €706 million. The company is owned by PAI Partners (62%) and Charles Jobson (38%), shares for the company were delisted.

== History ==
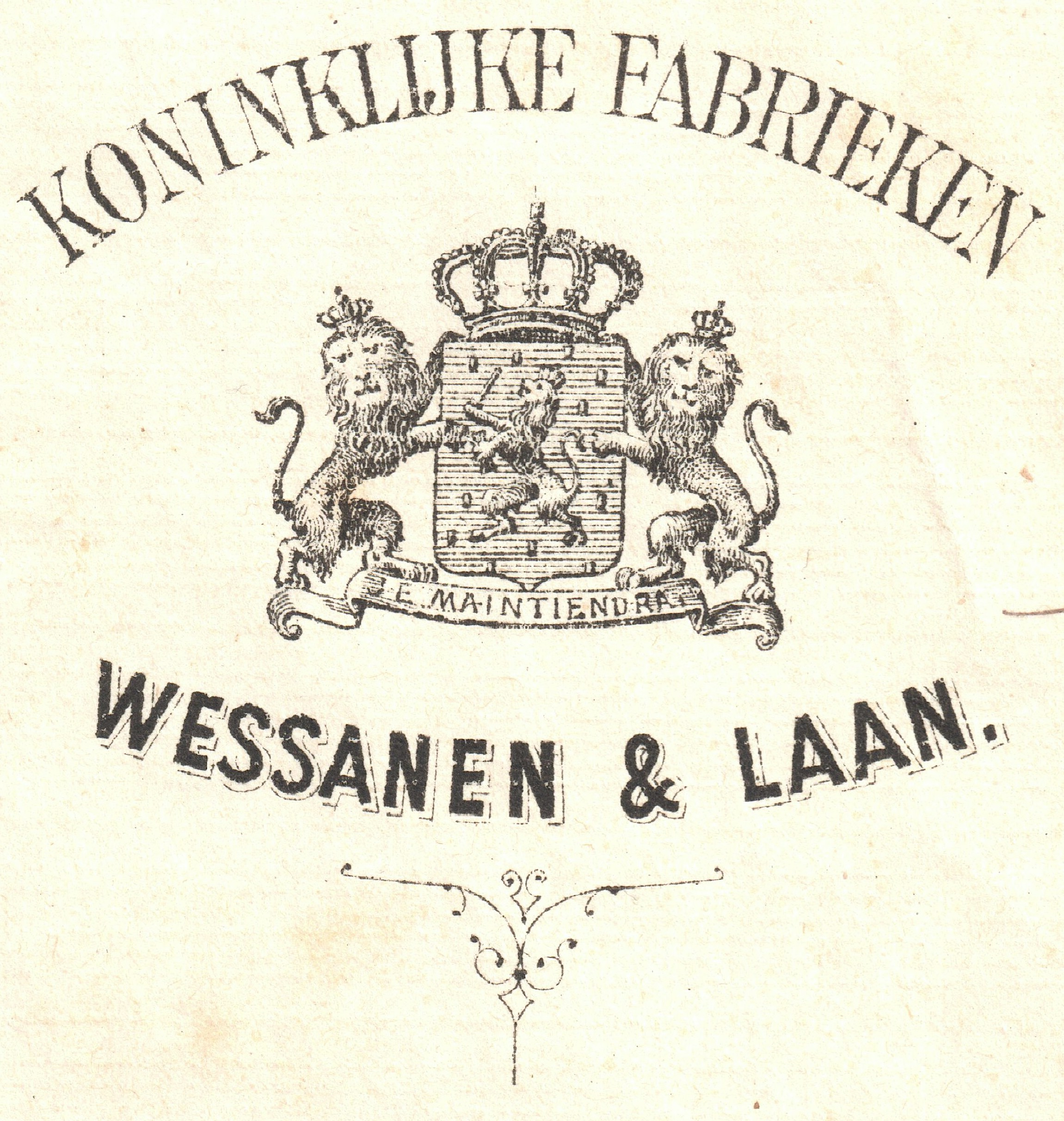
Wessanen & Laan letterhead, 1879

'Wessanen en Laan' was founded in 1765 in Wormerveer by Adriaan Wessanen and Dirk Laan to trade in ‘Mustard, Canary and other seeds’. The company flourished as new uses were found for all sorts of seeds. It was helped by the contemporary popularity for keeping caged birds, particularly canaries. At the beginning of the 19th century, the landscape around the Zaan river was dominated by merchants’ houses, their warehouses and, most distinctively, their windmills. In the pre-industrial age, the windmills functioned as sophisticated processing plants, using wind power to crush, grind and mix all manner of ingredients.

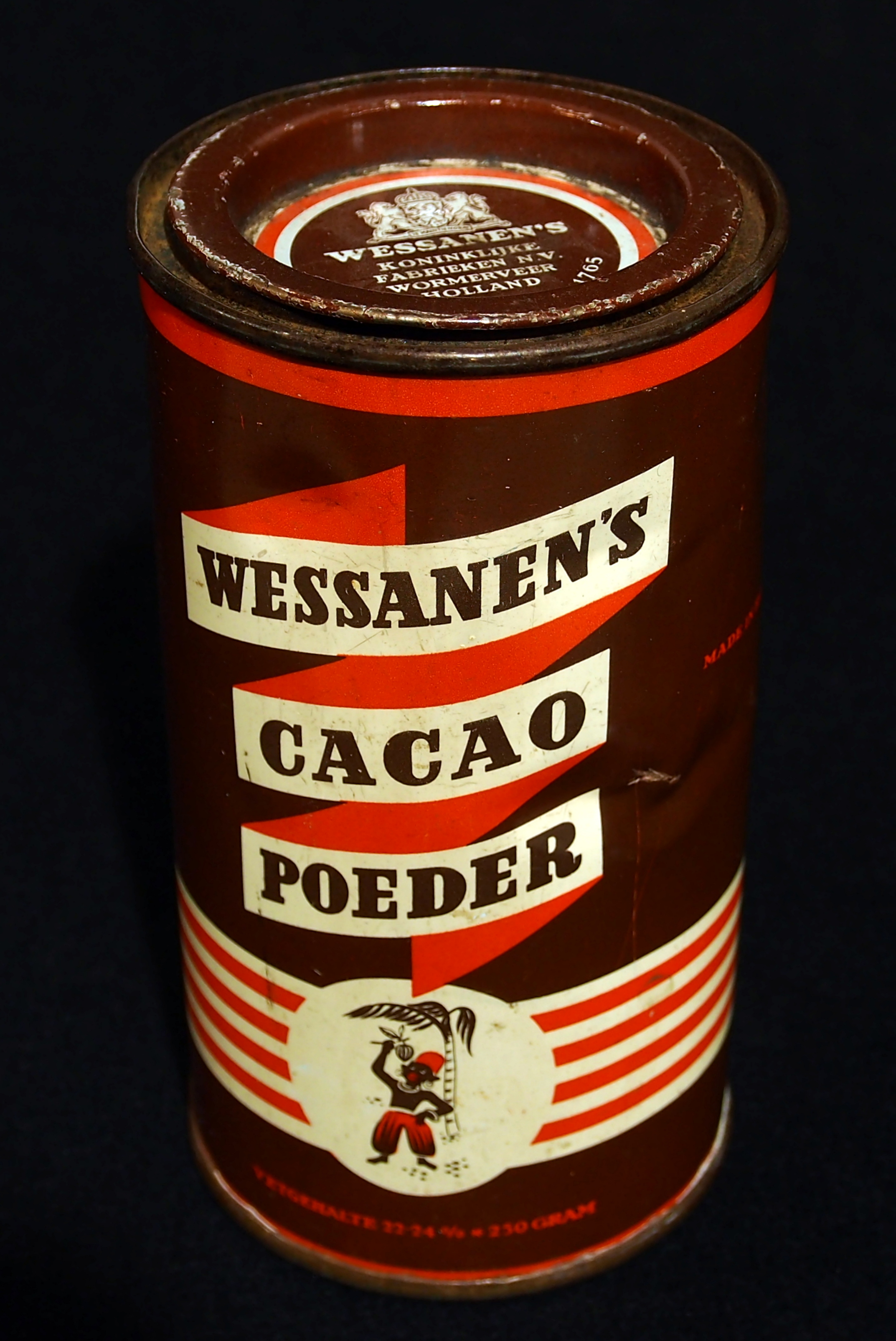
Old can of Wessanen cocoa powder

Wessanen was by the start of the 20th century a large company, and following the award of royal warrants it was now known as NV Wessanen Koninklijke Fabrieken (royal factories). With a diversified global sales market, it was able to survive war, tariff barriers and the demise of colonialism. But it was still a typically Dutch company, with production facilities on the Zaan River. In 2018, the company had annual sales of over 600 million euros. France is the largest sales market, more than half of sales are realized here. The Netherlands' share is less than 10%. It employed 1,360 people as of December 31, 2018. At year-end 2018, the market capitalization was €612 million (2017: €1307 million). Harborside, owned by American Charlie Jobson, has been the largest shareholder for years with a minority stake of 20-25%. In March 2019, French investor PAI, after coordinating with Jobson, made an offer of €11.50 per Wessanen share.

== Activities ==
Wessanen works with organic or natural food

In Europe Wessanen is, next to the Netherlands (Wessanen Benelux, Natudis, Foodprints, Kroon Biologische Verswaren), active in Belgium (Hagor-Bioservice), Germany (Allos Hof-Manufaktur GmbH, Allos GmbH, Allos Schwarzwald GmbH), France (Bjorg Bonneterre et Compagnie), the United Kingdom (Kallo Foods, Clipper tea) and Italy (Bio Slym, Abafoods).

Wessanen decided to leave the North American market. Its Tree of Life unit, part of the firm since 1985, was sold to Chicago-based Kehe Food Distributors for $190 million in early 2010. It concluded the €16.7 million sale of its bread products subsidiary Panos in December 2010, and sold American Beverage Corporation to Harvest Hill Beverage Co. in 2015.

== Brands ==
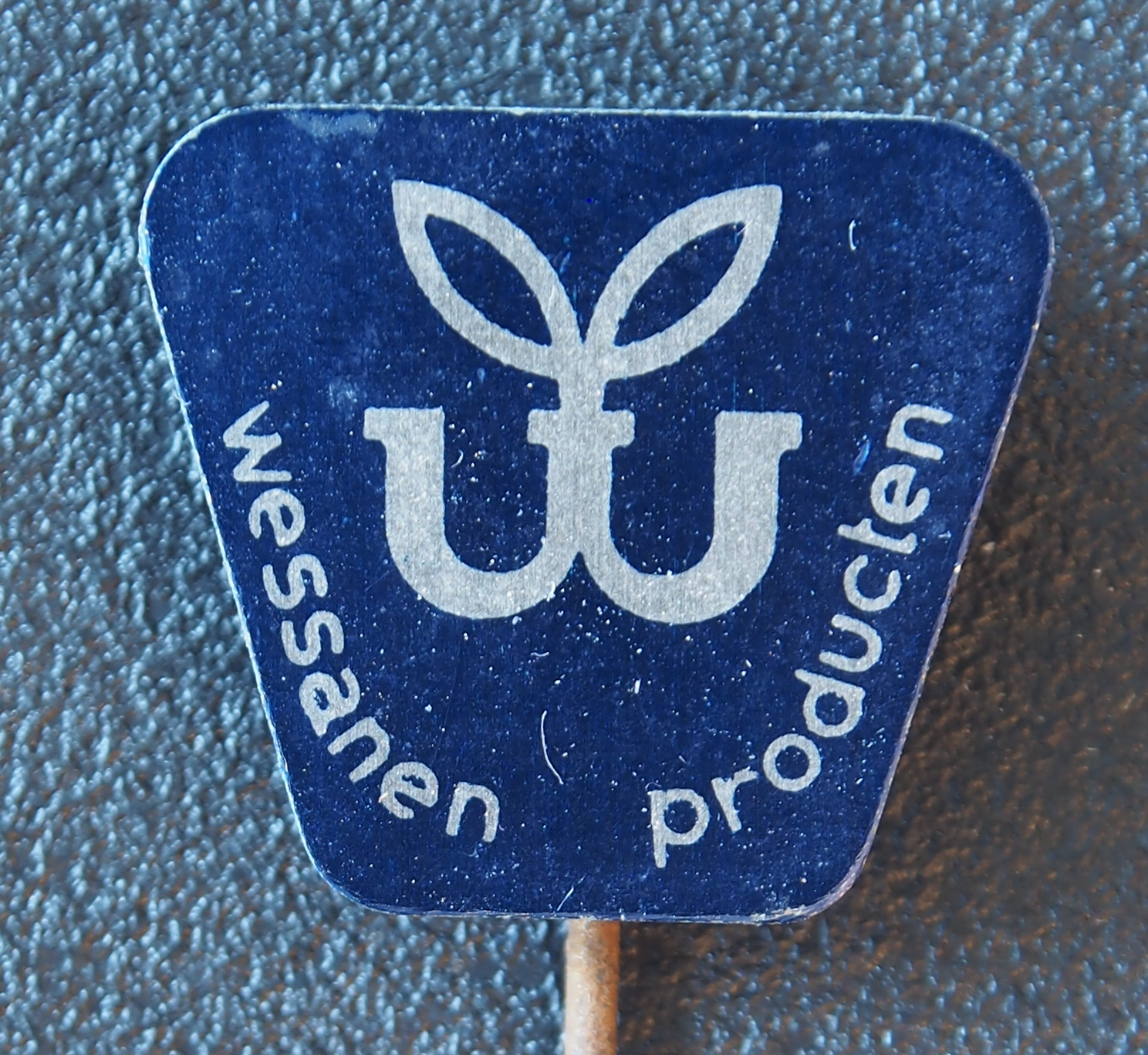
Advertising pin

Some of Wessanen's brands include:

- Allos
- Bjorg
- Bonneterre
- Clipper tea
- Kallø
- Tartex
- Whole Earth (sold to KP Snacks in 2024)
- Zonnatura

== Board of directors ==
=== Executive board ===
- Christophe Barnouin, CEO
- Ronald Merckx, CFO

=== Supervisory board ===
- Frank van Oers, Chairman
- Rudy Kluiber
- Ivonne Rietjens
- Patrick Mispolet
