= Chase Vodka =

Brand of British alcoholic drink

- Type: Vodka
- Manufacturer: Diageo
- Origin: United Kingdom
- Introduced: 2008
- Alcohol by volume: 40%
- Proof (US): 80
- Variants: Chase Original Vodka; Chase Marmalade Vodka; Chase English Oak Smoked Vodka; Naked Chase Apple Vodka; Chase Rhubarb Vodka
- Related products: Chase Elderflower Liqueur Chase Fresh Fruit Liqueurs Williams Chase Elegant Gin Williams Chase GB Extra Dry Gin Williams Chase Seville Orange Gin Chase Summer Fruit Cup
- Website: chasedistillery.co.uk

Chase Vodka is an English brand of vodka owned and produced by Diageo. The Chase brand began as a single estate potato vodka made in Herefordshire, England, UK by William Chase, who is also known for founding Tyrrells crisps.

Chase Vodka was voted Best in the world in April 2010 at the San Francisco World Spirits Competition.

Their distillery had the tallest rectification column in Europe.

== Company history ==
The Chase Distillery, the UK's first single-estate distillery, was founded on a farm in Herefordshire in 2008. It is a family business run by its founder, William Chase Proceeds from the sale of Tyrrells were then used to establish the Chase Distillery, which produced its first batch of vodka in June 2008. In its first year, Chase Distillery sales reached £140,000, and continued growth enabled the company to create a worldwide export market that included 36 countries between 2010 and 2016. As of February 2016, the Chase Distillery was selling 10,000 bottles of spirits per week.

Chase Distillery was acquired by Diageo on 1 March 2021. The Chase Distillery site in Herefordshire was closed in January 2025 with production moving to Cameronbridge distillery in Fife, Scotland.

== Product description ==
Chase Vodka is a premium potato-based vodka made from specialty potato varieties such as Lady Claire and King Edward. It is a single-estate vodka, meaning that the base ingredients used for the vodka are produced on site (including the apples used for Naked Chase Apple Vodka). The production process involves peeling, heating and mashing the potatoes before adding yeast for fermentation. Next the potatoes are transferred to a traditional copper pot still where steam is used to raise the temperature and encourage distillation. Vapours rise up through the 70 ft tall rectification column, resulting in a vodka that has effectively been distilled 119 times. Finally, distilled water from the onsite borehole – which draws water from underneath the farm's apple trees – is used to dilute the vodka to 40% ABV.

== Flavours ==
Chase Original Vodka is described on the company website as "a beautifully smooth vodka with a naturally sweet and creamy taste". Other potato vodka products from the Chase Distillery are flavoured with elderflower (Chase Elderflower Liqueur), fresh fruit (Chase Fresh Fruit Liqueurs), Seville orange (Chase Marmalade Vodka), smoked oak (Chase English Oak Smoked Vodka) and rhubarb (Chase Rhubarb Vodka). Chase also produces an apple vodka (Naked Chase Apple Vodka), using apples sourced from their estate, in addition to a range of gin products (Williams Gin).

== Awards ==
Chase Vodka was named as the world's best vodka at the 2010 San Francisco World Spirits Competition, beating 249 other vodkas from countries including Russia and Poland.

== See also ==
- William Chase
- Tyrrells (crisps)
