= Cambridge House =

Townhouse in Piccadilly, London, England

Coordinates: 51.5058°N 0.1452°W

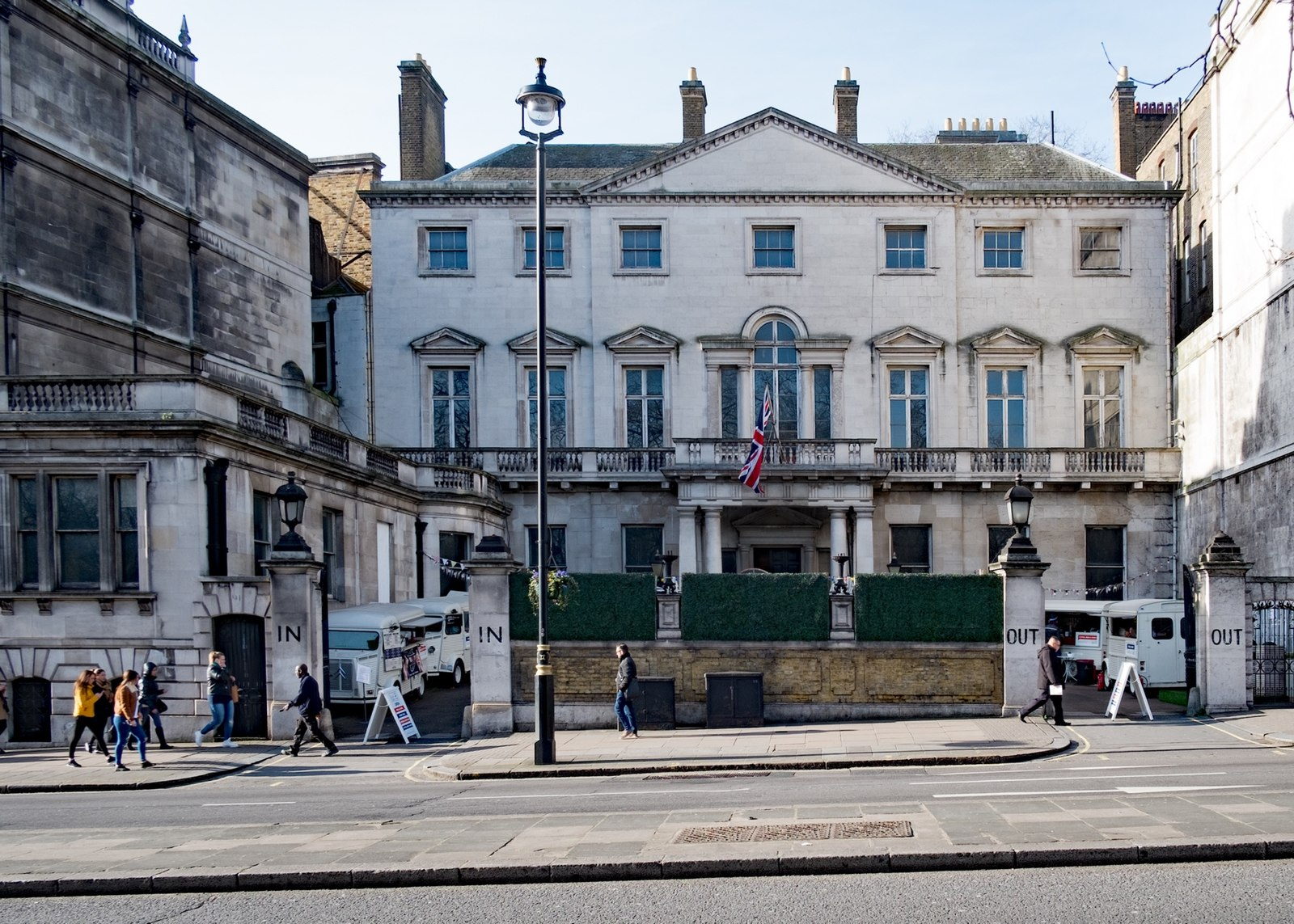
Cambridge House in 2010, showing the neoclassical main façade

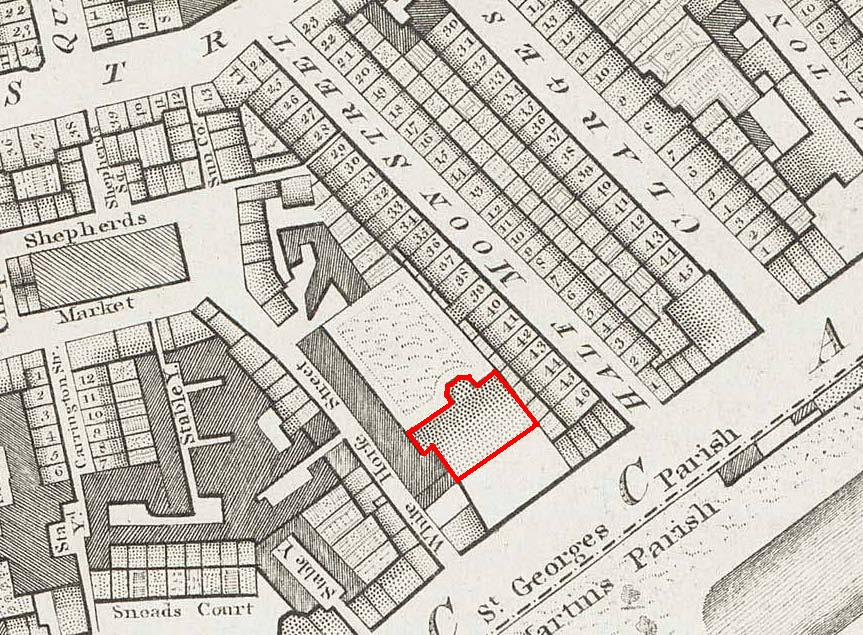
Position of Cambridge House, marked on a 1799 map of London

Cambridge House is a Grade I listed former townhouse in the City of Westminster, England. It sits on the northern side of Piccadilly at number 94, in the fashionable district of Mayfair. As of 2021, the property is being converted into a luxury hotel and seven residences.

The current name of the house comes from one of its former owners, Prince Adolphus, Duke of Cambridge (1774–1850), the seventh son of King George III, but it was originally known as Egremont House and then Cholmondeley House. From about 1865 to 1999, it was the home of the Naval and Military Club and was known colloquially as the In and Out Club, due to its prominently signposted one-way carriage drive.

== Early history ==
The house, situated in the fashionable parish of St George's, Hanover Square, Westminster, was built in 1756–1761 by Charles Wyndham, 2nd Earl of Egremont (1710–1763), of Orchard Wyndham in Somerset and of Petworth House in Sussex, Secretary of State for the Southern Department from 1761 to 1763, and was thus first known as Egremont House. The building is in the late Palladian style, to the design of the architect Matthew Brettingham. It has three main storeys plus basement and attics, and is seven bays wide. As is usual in a London mansion of the period, the first floor (piano nobile, "second floor" in American English) is the principal floor, containing a circuit of reception rooms. This floor has the highest ceilings and its status is emphasised externally by a Venetian window in the centre.

The house changed hands several times. For several years in the 1820s, it was occupied by George Cholmondeley, 1st Marquess of Cholmondeley, and was known as Cholmondeley House.

=== Royal residence ===
From 1829 to 1850, the house was the London residence of Queen Victoria's uncle Prince Adolphus, Duke of Cambridge, and became known as Cambridge House. In June 1850 Robert Pate assaulted the Queen by hitting her on head with his cane as she was leaving Cambridge House, where she had been visiting her dying uncle Adolphus.

=== Later occupants ===
After the death of the Duke of Cambridge in 1850, the house was leased by Sir Richard Sutton, 2nd Bt, who died at Cambridge House in November 1855.

The house was advertised as being for lease from December 1855 to mid-1856; in August 1856 the-then Prime Minister of the United Kingdom Henry Temple, 3rd Viscount Palmerston finalised an agreement to lease Cambridge House, and took possession of the property in November 1856. Cambridge House continued to serve as Lord Palmerston's London townhouse throughout the 1850s and early 1860s, and was the site of many splendid social and political gatherings. After Palmerston's death in 1865 at Brocket Hall in Hertfordshire, his body was taken to Cambridge House, whence his funeral procession departed to Westminster Abbey.

=== Clubhouse ===
Later that year, Cambridge House was sold to the Naval and Military Club, which had outgrown its previous headquarters. The club came to be known as the "In and Out", from the prominent traffic-directing signs on its entrance and exit gates. Members included Lawrence of Arabia and Ian Fleming.

== Recent history ==
In 1999, the Naval and Military Club moved to new premises, having sold Cambridge House in 1996 to entrepreneur Simon Halabi for £50 million. Halabi planned to convert the property into a private members' club and hotel, part of his Mentmore Towers project, and to build a swimming pool and squash courts underneath the forecourt of the house. However, the building remained vacant after 1999, and it fell into a state of disrepair. Plaster was falling off the ceiling in the first floor rooms, and many floorboards had been pulled up. In 2009, Halabi's companies went into bankruptcy.

In June 2010, Cambridge House and its adjoining buildings, 90–93 Piccadilly (and 42 Half Moon Street), 95 Piccadilly (the former American Club) and 12 White Horse Street (the rear section being vacant land), as well as 96–100 Piccadilly (on the other side of White Horse Street), were all offered for sale through property brokers JLL, collectively referred to as the Piccadilly Estate, for in excess of £150m. In June 2011, the site was acquired by David and Simon Reuben for a reported £130m through their investment company, Aldersgate. In October 2012, applications were submitted for a full refurbishment into private homes (Numbers 94 and 95) and residential apartments (Numbers 90–93 and 42).

In April 2013, David and Simon Reuben received approval to develop the property into a 5,630 square metres (60,600 ft^{2}) single home. It would likely have become the UK's most expensive home, estimated to be worth about £250 million after renovation. According to Bloomberg News, "the planning application for Number 94 was approved after the two investors offered to contribute £3.85 million to the construction of affordable housing in the borough."

However, that development plan subsequently changed, and a new plan was conceived to convert the property into the "Cambridge House Hotel and Residences", with a five-star hotel and seven serviced residences. Work on the project is being carried out by PDP London.
