= Golden Wonder potato =

Variety of potato

Potato 'Golden Wonder'
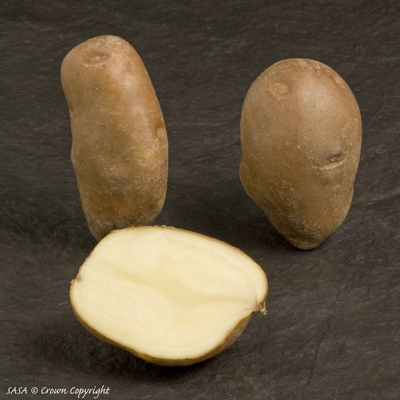
- Species: Solanum tuberosum
- Cultivar: 'Golden Wonder'
- Breeder: Mr. Brown of Arbroath
- Origin: Scotland

Golden Wonder is a late maincrop russet-skinned variety of potato. It is very dry and floury and is ideal for baking, roasting, and frying, but needs close attention paid when boiling, as it will disintegrate in the boiling water if left too long.

Despite common misconceptions, the Golden Wonder is unrelated to the better known King Edward variety.

The potato was originally found in the UK, by a Mr. Brown of Arbroath, Scotland, in 1906. It is a periclinal chimera with an outer layer of the variety 'Golden Wonder' and an inner core of the variety 'Langworthy'.

Yields of this potato tend to be on the low side. Although they can be susceptible to some diseases, slug and blight resistance are reasonable.

The crisp company Golden Wonder was named after the potato.
