= Kaliště (Prague-East District) =

- Municipality
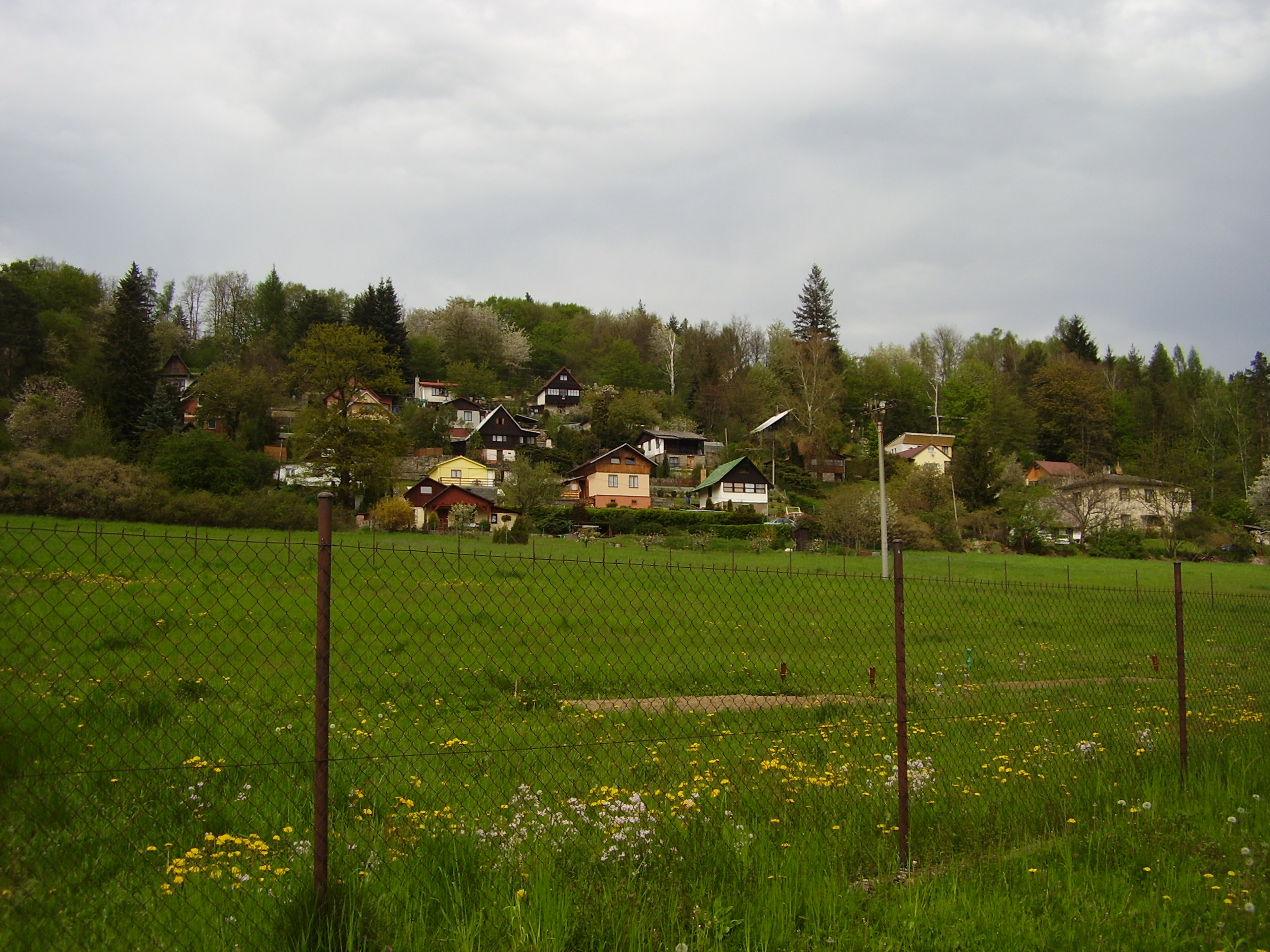
- Poddubí, a part of Kaliště

- Flag Coat of arms

- Location in the Czech Republic
- Coordinates: 49°52′58″N 14°46′28″E
- Country: Czech Republic
- Region: Central Bohemian
- District: Prague-East
- First mentioned: 1428

Area
  - Total: 6.24 km^{2} (2.41 sq mi)
- Elevation: 377 m (1,237 ft)

Population (2026-01-01)
  - Total: 384
  - Density: 61.5/km^{2} (159/sq mi)
- Time zone: UTC+1 (CET)
  - Summer (DST): UTC+2 (CEST)
- Postal code: 251 65
- Website: www.kaliste.eu

Kaliště is a municipality and village in Prague-East District in the Central Bohemian Region of the Czech Republic. It has about 400 inhabitants.

== Administrative division ==
Kaliště consists of three municipal parts (in brackets population according to the 2021 census):

- Kaliště (114)
- Lensedly (124)
- Poddubí (127)

== Etymology ==
The name Kaliště is derived from the Old Czech word kališče, i.e. 'puddle', 'mud'.

== Demographics ==
Historical population
Year	Pop.	±%
1869	356	—
1880	375	+5.3%
1890	412	+9.9%
1900	403	−2.2%
1910	393	−2.5%
1921	385	−2.0%
1930	386	+0.3%
1950	324	−16.1%
1961	334	+3.1%
1970	236	−29.3%
1980	203	−14.0%
1991	138	−32.0%
2001	158	+14.5%
2011	225	+42.4%
2021	365	+62.2%
Source: Censuses
