= Naval and Military Club =

Private members' club in London, England

Coordinates: 51.5080°N 0.1348°W

- Nickname: The In & Out
- Formation: 1 March 1862 (164 years ago)
- Purpose: Private members club, founded for Royal Navy and British Army officers
- Location: 4 St James's Square, London
- Members: Military officers (and some non-military members)
- Key people: HRH The Princess Royal (President); Richard Dilworth, MVO (Chairman)
- Website: theinandout.co.uk

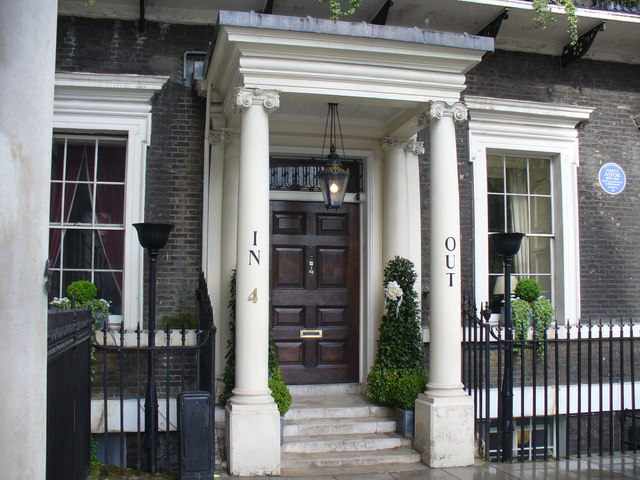
Entrance of the Naval and Military Club in St James's Square, with "IN" and "OUT" in humorous reference to previous Cambridge House premises

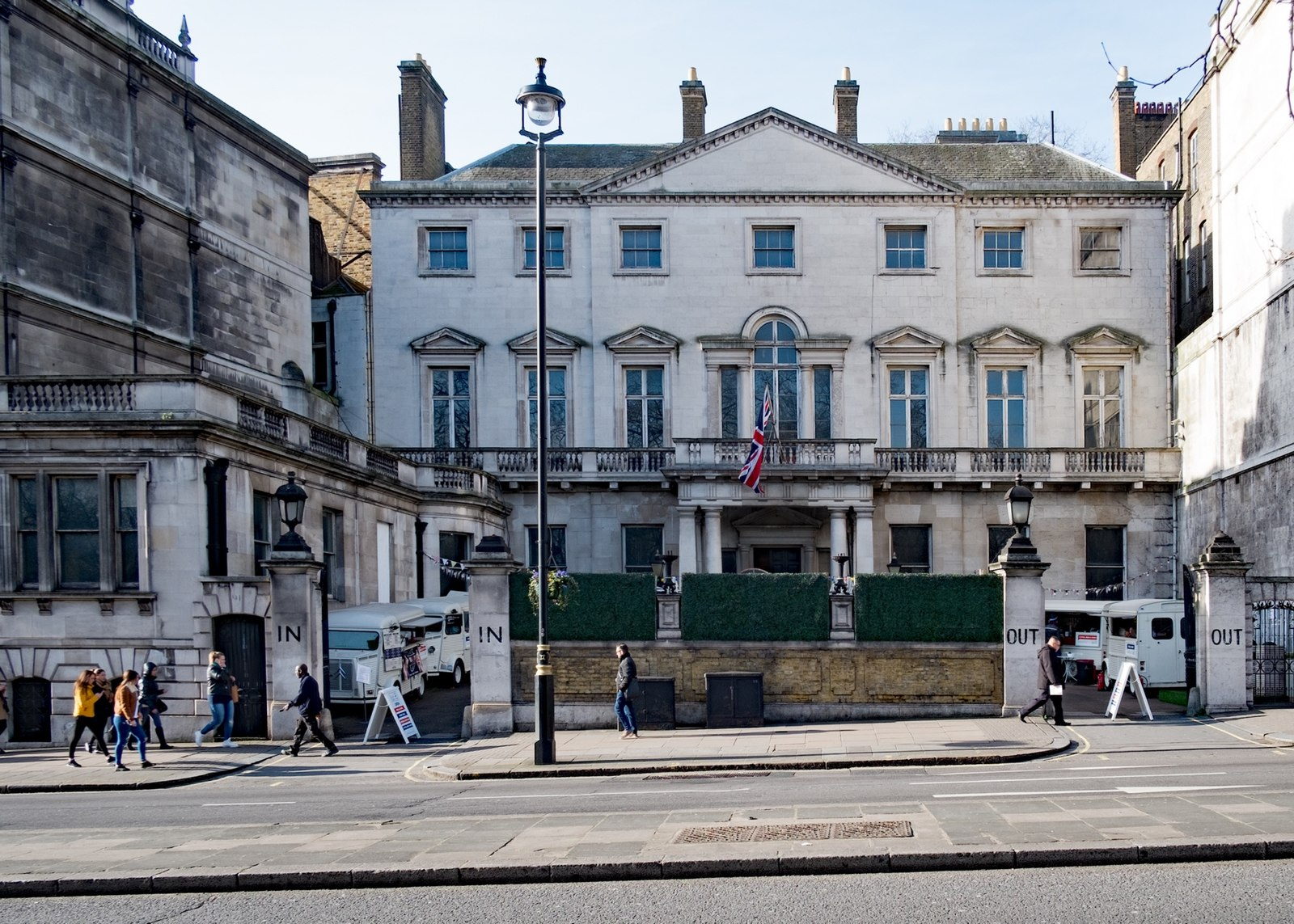
Cambridge House, the club's former premises on Piccadilly

The Naval and Military Club, informally known as The In & Out, is a private members' club located in St James's Square, London. It was founded in 1862 for officers of the Royal Navy and British Army. It now also accepts female members. While the club continues to observe service traditions, it now accepts applications for non-military membership.

== Origins ==
The club was founded in 1862 by six officers, chiefly from the Buffs, because the three then existing military clubs in London – the United Service, the Junior United Service, and the Army and Navy – were all full.

== Premises ==
The Club was formerly based at Cambridge House at 94 Piccadilly, opposite Green Park. It came to be known as "The In & Out" from the prominent signs on the building's separate vehicle entrance and exit gates. This building was bombed by the Provisional IRA on 11 December 1974. A bomb was thrown into the famous long bar of the club; one steward was injured in the blast, the only casualty of the attack.

In 1996, the club purchased its current premises at 4 St James's Square, designed by Edward Shepherd in 1679 for Anthony Grey, 11th Earl of Kent and the former London home of Waldorf and Nancy Astor from 1912 to 1942. After a programme of refurbishment the club took up occupancy on 1 February 1999. To perpetuate its traditional nickname, the words "In" and "Out" were painted on the two flanking columns of the portico of the house.

In 2011 Cambridge House, in disrepair, was acquired by property tycoons David and Simon Reuben. They planned to convert the Grade I listed building into a 48-room private house with a value estimated at £214 million but this plan was axed in 2017 in favour of a 102-room hotel and four serviced apartments.

== Facilities ==
The club has dining, banqueting and bar facilities, and 52 bedrooms available to members. At the front entrance, in keeping with the traditions of "Clubland", a dress code is observed (jacket and tie for gentlemen, and equivalent for ladies, although "military dress can, of course, also be worn"). The rear entrance in Babmaes Street, just off Jermyn Street, is less formal: it allows direct access to the business centre, gym, swimming pool and "The Goat" bar and brasserie.

The club co-operates closely with and shares its premises with the Norwegian association Den Norske Klub and the Latin American Canning Club. It also provides a home for the Fleet Air Arm Officers' Association and the International Wine and Food Society.

== Membership and subscriptions ==
In 2025, Anne, Princess Royal accepted the role of President of the club. This appointment was in succession to her father, Prince Philip, Duke of Edinburgh, who had been a member from 1947 until his death in 2021.

Other notable past members include Prince Louis of Battenberg, Louis Mountbatten, 1st Earl Mountbatten of Burma, Field Marshal the Earl Roberts, John Jellicoe, 1st Earl Jellicoe, Douglas Haig, 1st Earl Haig, Redvers Buller, David Niven, Michael Boyce, Baron Boyce, T. E. Lawrence, and Robert Falcon Scott, who is commemorated on the Club's Roll of Honour.

The club includes a total of thirty-three past members who have been awarded either the Victoria Cross or George Cross. All current recipients of these awards are honorary members of the club.

Andrew Mountbatten-Windsor was formerly a member, but resigned in March 2022.

Notable current members include William Astor, 4th Viscount Astor, Khalid bin Sultan, Peter de la Billière, and Peter Wall, who previously served as Chairman.

Membership, long restricted to military officers, now includes those who have not served in the armed forces. Members are, however, expected to respect service traditions.

The club no longer publicises its fees which are now only made available on receipt of an application form. Prospective members, who are not officers in the British Armed Forces, are normally required to have a proposer and seconder, both of whom must be members of two years standing, although in exceptional circumstances the membership committee may consider applicants without sponsors, following an interview with the club secretary.

Serving officers in the armed forces are not required to provide sponsors but are asked to provide evidence of current service.

== See also ==
- List of London's gentlemen's clubs
