= The North Alliance =

Scandinavian agency network

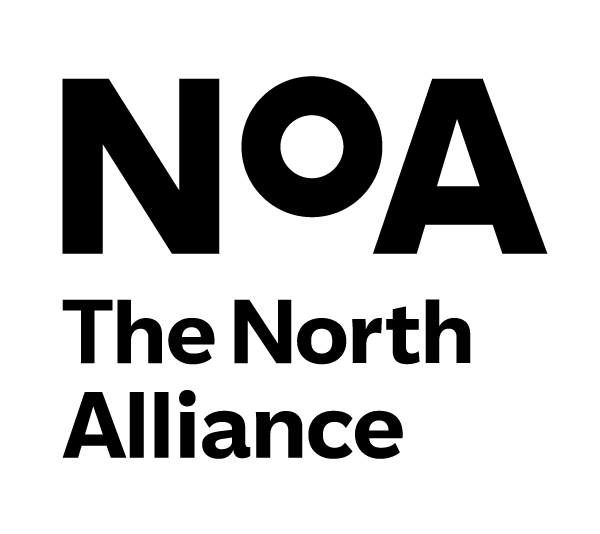
- Company type: Holding company
- Industry: Brand, Design, communications, technology, advertising, marketing
- Founded: 2014
- Founder: Thomas Høgebøl
- Headquarters: Oslo, Norway
- Area served: Worldwide
- Services: Branding & identity consumer insights design digital marketing market research public relations relationship marketing
- Revenue: 985 million NOK (2016)
- Number of employees: 1250 (2022)
- Subsidiaries: &Co, Åkestam Holst, Anorak, Axenon, BKRY, Bold, NoA Consulting, NoA Connect, NoA Health NoA Ignite, North Kingdom, Scienta, Agitec, DK&A, Bluebird, Bob the Robot & Unfold
- Website: www.thenorthalliance.com

The North Alliance (NoA) is a Scandinavian agency network, working with design, communication and technology. Founded in 2014, it is organized as a holding company and consists of 26 cooperating agencies in Denmark, Norway, Sweden, Finland and Poland with over 1250 employees. In 2016 the combined turnover was estimated at around €100 million.

== Agencies ==
- &Co
- Åkestam Holst
- Anorak
- Axenon
- Bold
- NoA Consulting
- NoA Connect
- NoA Elevate
- NoA Health
- NoA Ignite
- North Kingdom
- Unfold
- Agitec
- Bluebird
- Scienta
- Bob the Robot
- DK&A

== History ==
The conglomerate was formed in January 2014 by Thomas Høgebøl, former head of McCann Worldgroup, backed by Finnish private equity fund CapMan Group. 2017 Capman Group exited and the private equity firm Norvestor stepped in as new owner of NoA.
