= Lumene =

Finnish cosmetics manufacturer

Coordinates: 60°11′11″N 24°35′53″E

LUMENE Oy
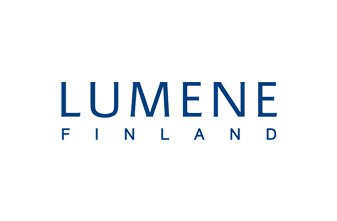
- Industry: Cosmetics
- Founded: 1948
- Headquarters: Espoo, Finland
- Revenue: €90 million (2014)
- Number of employees: 530
- Website: www.lumene.com

Lumene is a Finnish manufacturer of cosmetics, based in Kauklahti, Espoo. The majority of the Lumene products are developed and manufactured in Finland. The company's key markets are Finland, Scandinavia, UK and China.

As of September 2021, the main owner of the company is a Nordic capital investor Verdane. In February 2025, Swedish investment company Creades acquired a 20% minority stake in the company from Verdane.

The name of the brand is inspired by Lake Lummenne in Kuhmoinen, Central Finland.

== Sustainability ==
Between 2007 and 2019, Lumene reduced their water usage in their products by 40 percent. Their products contain sustainable Arctic Spring Water. The water is filtered through sand and gravel layers before being collected from a hole in the ice. The water has low mineral content, making it a neutral base for other active ingredients.

In 2010, the company began a WaterSmart program to help reduce water consumption. Between 2007 and 2019, Lumene reduced the use of water in their production by 40 percent.

in 2021, Lumene replaced microplastics in its exfoliating products with Finnish birch bark.

== History ==
Lumene was founded in 1970 by the Finnish pharmaceutical company Orion-yhtymä Oy as a cosmetics brand inspired by Nordic nature, with its name derived from Lake Lummenne in Central Finland. The brand became Finland’s market leader within just three years of its launch, and gained recognition for its use of Finnish natural ingredients such as Arctic berry oils and spring water.

Throughout the 1970s and 1980s, Lumene expanded its product range and began exporting to neighboring Sweden and later to other international markets. By the late 1990s, the brand had broadened its export footprint to include Russia, the Baltic countries, and the US, and was known for products leveraging native botanicals and wild berries.

In 2003, Orion divested its cosmetics business, selling Noiro Oy (which owned Lumene) to private equity investors led by CapMan, with later co-ownership by Langholm Capital LLP. The company was renamed Lumene Oy in 2005.

In September 2021, Nordic private equity firm Verdane became majority owner of Lumene. In December 2023, Lumene acquired the Swedish self-tanning and haircare brand Ida Warg Beauty, adding to its portfolio alongside the Cutrin professional haircare brand.

In February 2025, Swedish investment company Creades became a minority shareholder.
