= Kallø =

British organic foodstuffs company

Kallo Foods Limited (formerly Caraway Services Limited from January–March 1994, Garma Gourmet (UK) Limited from 1994 to 1997 and Garma Foods International Limited from 1997 to 2001), trading as Kallø, is a British company that specialises in organic and natural foodstuffs. The firm has belonged since 2001 to Ecotone (called Royal Wessanen until November 2020), a company headquartered in France with origins the Netherlands.

== Products ==
The Kallø range of products includes (adapted from the Kallø website):

- puffed rice, corn and lentil cakes
- stock cubes
- gravy powder
- puffed rice
