= Eccleston Yards =

Open-air mall in Belgravia, London

Coordinates: 51.4936°N 0.1483°W

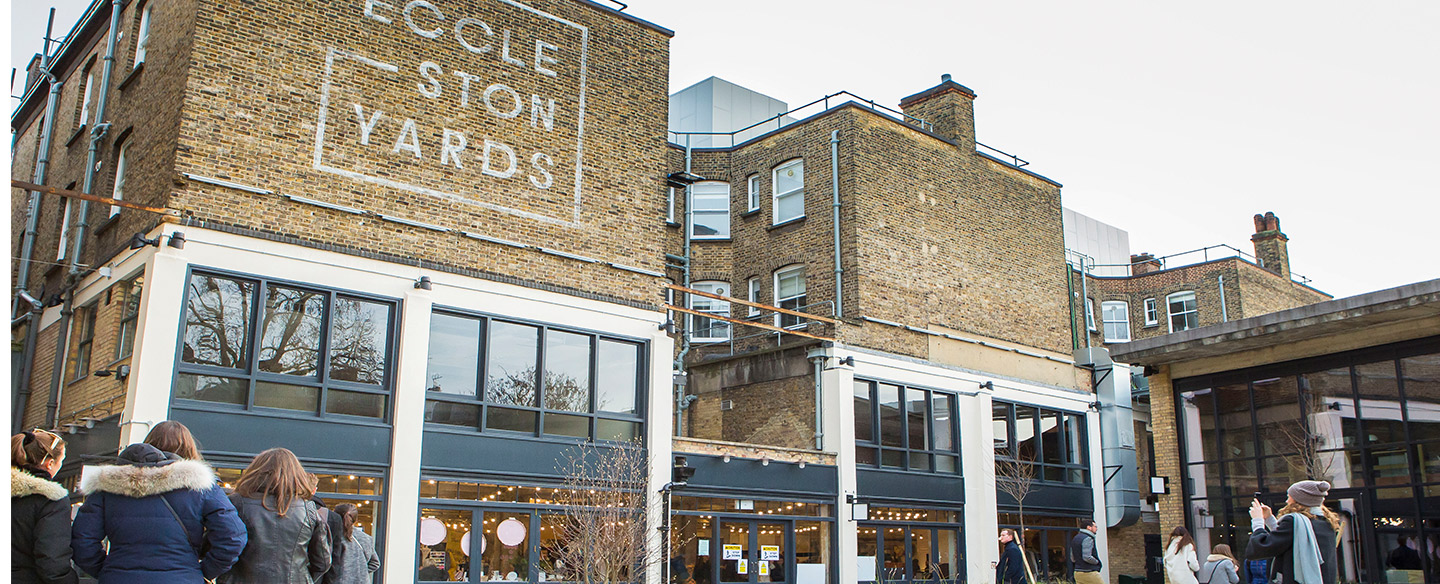
Eccleston Yards in the winter

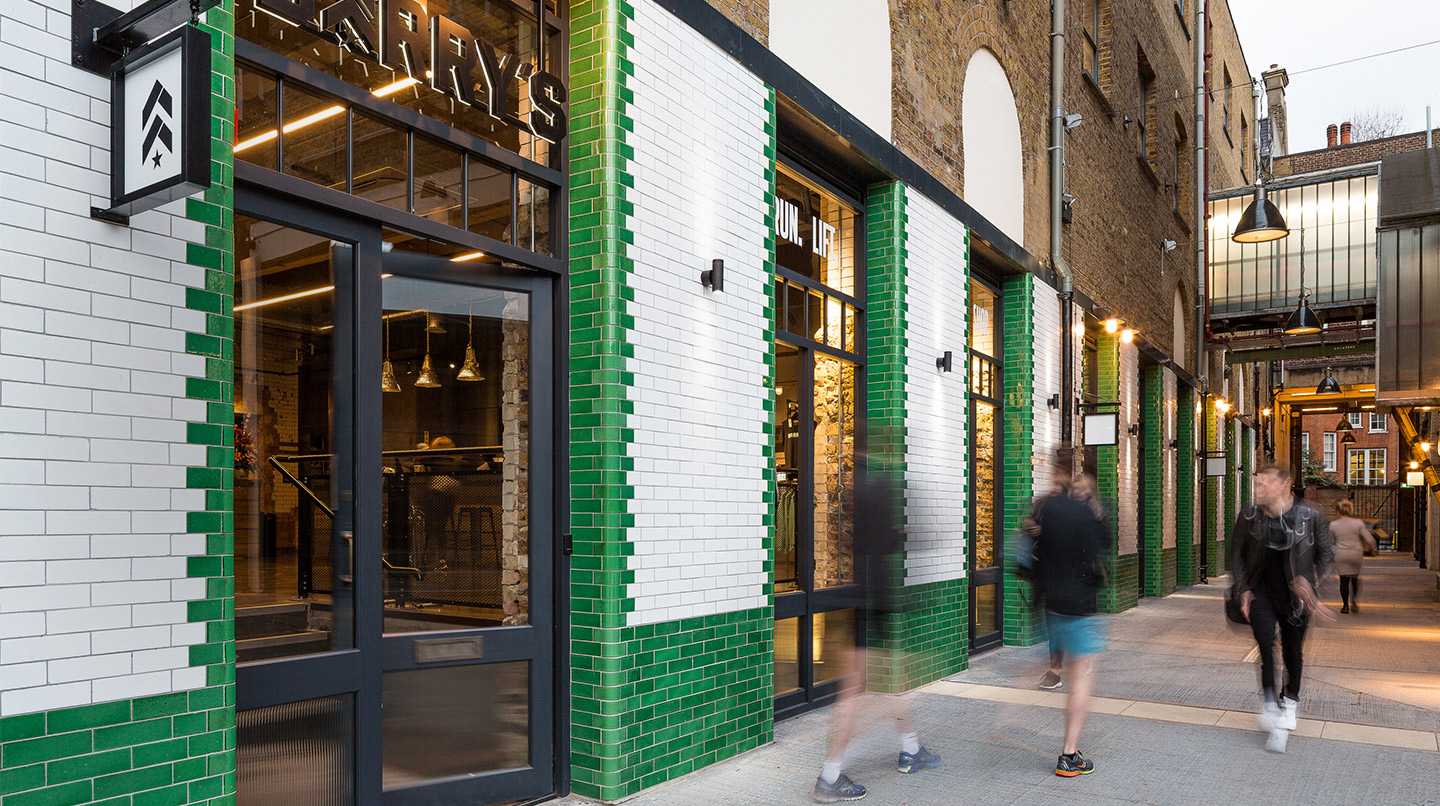
Barry's in Eccleston Yards

Eccleston Yards is an open-air mall in Belgravia, London, that is located between Eccleston Place, Eccleston Street, Ebury Street and Elizabeth Street. It is approximately a seven-minute walk from London Victoria Station. Eccleston Yards owned by the Grosvenor Group and managed by Grosvenor Britain & Ireland. It consists of 19 units which include shops, businesses, restaurants and fitness studios, i.e. Barry's.

Eccleston Yards was previously the site of Eccleston Place Power Station, owned by Westminster Electric Supply Corporation Ltd. which supplied electricity to the Mayfair & Belgravia area for the first time in 1891. The yard was redeveloped from a car park to a co-working and creative hub in 2018; part of a £1 billion investment program for the Belgravia area. The architectural designs for the redevelopment were among 27 projects shortlisted for the RIBA Regional Awards (South London) in 2020.

Eccleston Yards opened in the summer of 2018 and is often the venue for various events, such as open air screenings of the Wimbledon Tennis Championships.
