= Kalište (Slovakia) =

Defunct municipality in Slovakia

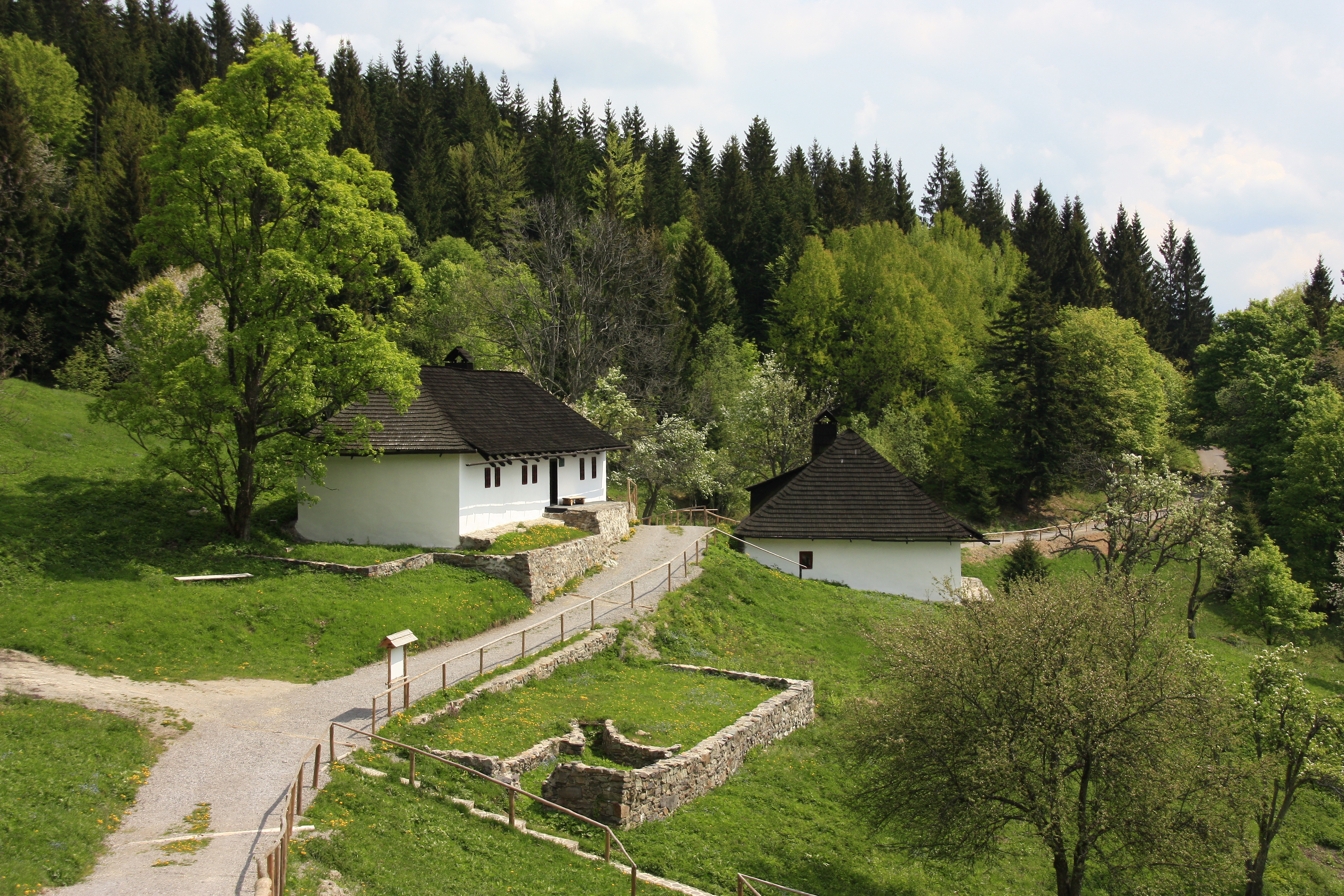
Memorial place in Kalište

Kalište (Hungarian: Kallós) was a village in the Banská Bystrica District in Slovakia. It was destroyed by the Nazis during the Slovak National Uprising in the Second World War. Its remains are now managed by the Museum of the Slovak National Uprising.

== History ==
Kalište is remote, 924 metres above sea level in the hills north-east of the town of Banská Bystrica. It was an ideal place for partisans who had taken part in the Slovak National Uprising to seek supplies and occasionally shelter in the winter of 1944–5.

At 4 a.m. on March 18, 1945, Nazi German troops arrived. The villagers were shot as they emerged from their houses and the village was then burned to the ground. Five days later the area was liberated by the advancing Soviet Army. Only two houses now remain; stone foundations mark the sites of the other 36. The museum has erected information boards about the massacre around the site. Deputy director Roman Hradecký explains that the rest — and indeed the whole site — are intended to celebrate the lives of the people who lived here rather than just dwell on their fate.
