= Lipí =

- Municipality
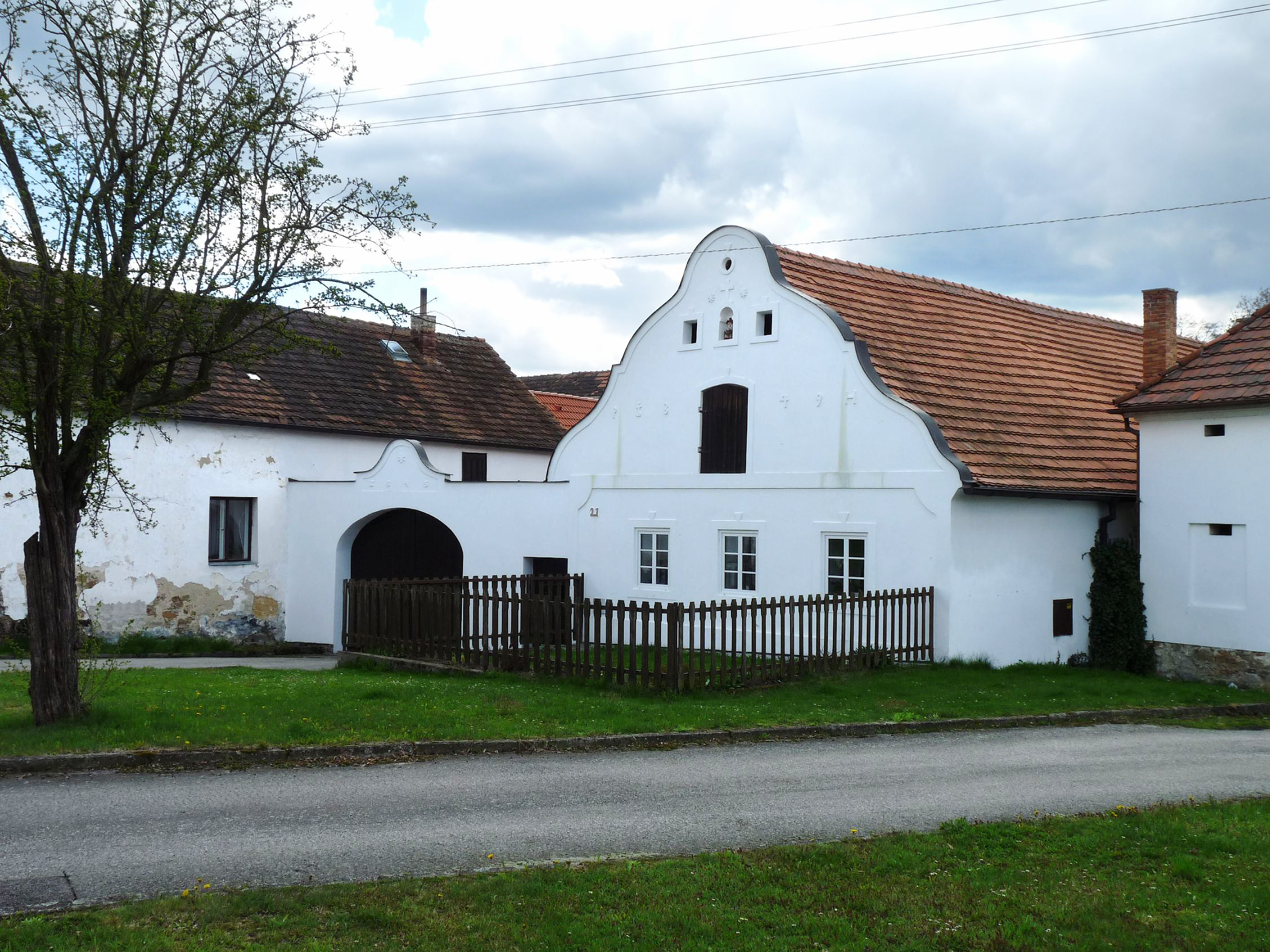
- Folk Baroque house in the centre of Lipí

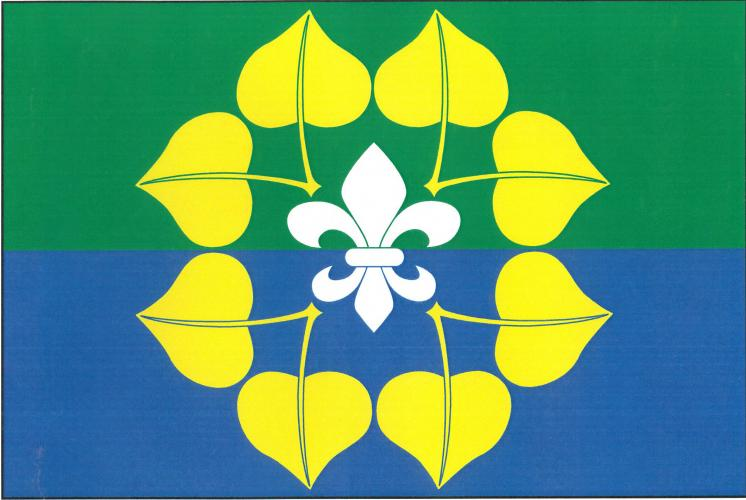
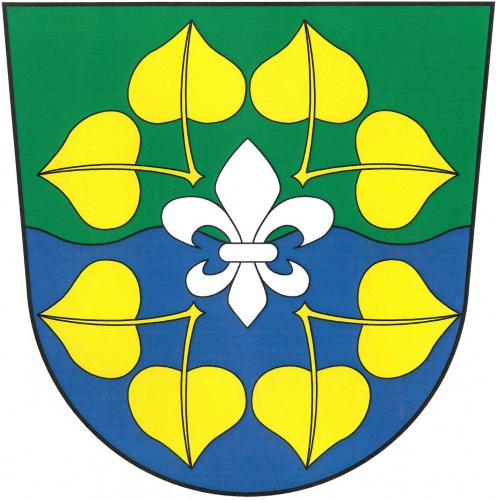
- Flag Coat of arms

- Location in the Czech Republic
- Coordinates: 48°56′58″N 14°21′8″E
- Country: Czech Republic
- Region: South Bohemian
- District: České Budějovice
- First mentioned: 1389

Area
  - Total: 7.81 km^{2} (3.02 sq mi)
- Elevation: 440 m (1,440 ft)

Population (2026-01-01)
  - Total: 690
  - Density: 88/km^{2} (230/sq mi)
- Time zone: UTC+1 (CET)
  - Summer (DST): UTC+2 (CEST)
- Postal code: 373 84
- Website: www.lipi.cz

Lipí is a municipality and village in České Budějovice District in the South Bohemian Region of the Czech Republic. It has about 700 inhabitants.

Lipí lies approximately 10 kilometres (6 mi) west of České Budějovice and 127 km (79 mi) south of Prague.

== Administrative division ==
Lipí consists of two municipal parts (in brackets population according to the 2021 census):

- Lipí (475)
- Kaliště u Lipí (170)

== Demographics ==
Historical population
Year	Pop.	±%
1869	549	—
1880	608	+10.7%
1890	577	−5.1%
1900	571	−1.0%
1910	553	−3.2%
1921	541	−2.2%
1930	507	−6.3%
1950	429	−15.4%
1961	459	+7.0%
1970	397	−13.5%
1980	455	+14.6%
1991	479	+5.3%
2001	537	+12.1%
2011	603	+12.3%
2021	645	+7.0%
Source: Censuses
