= King Edward potato =

Potato cultivar

King Edward
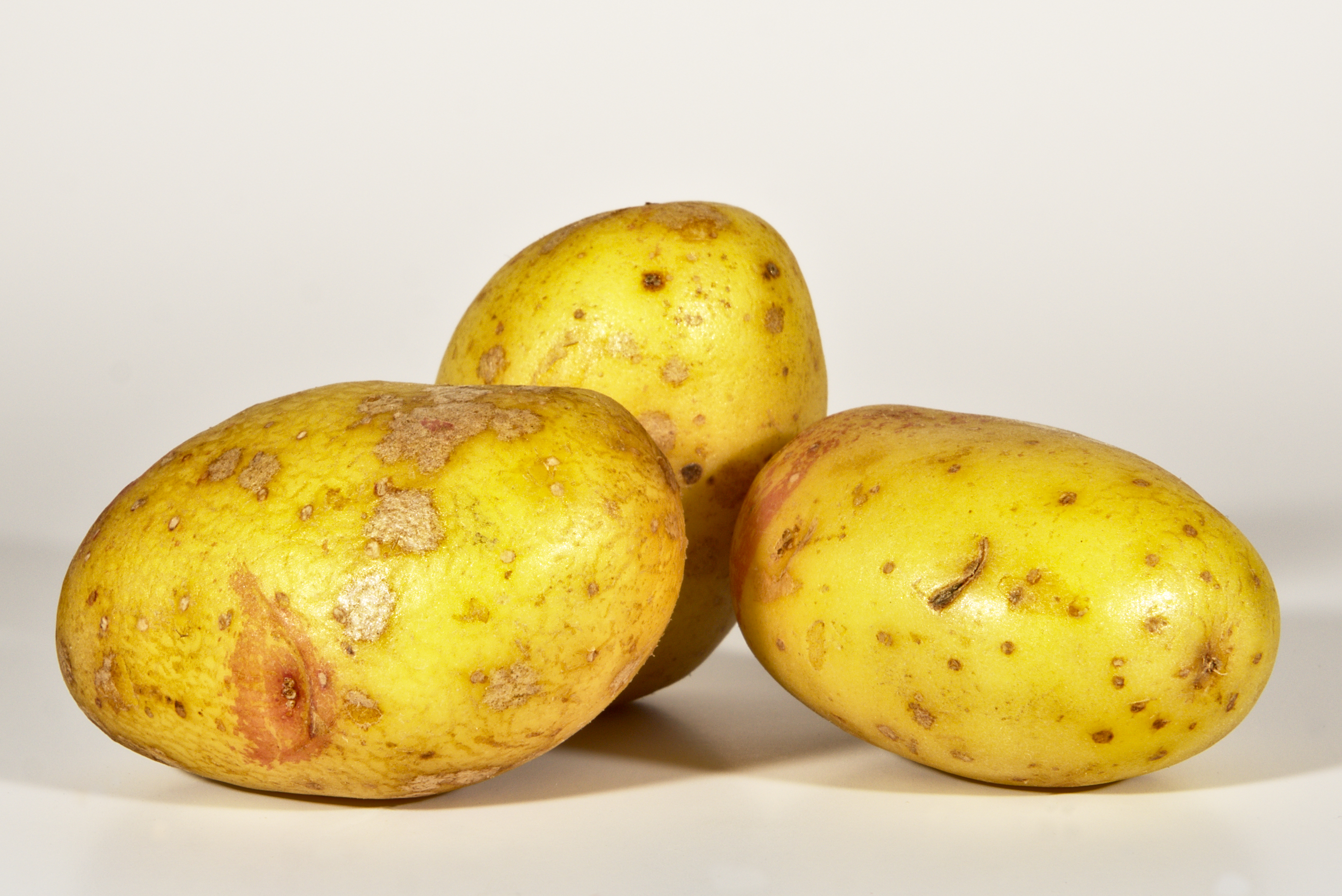
- King Edward
- Genus: Solanum
- Species: Solanum tuberosum
- Cultivar: 'King Edward'
- Breeder: John Butler
- Origin: Scotter, Lincolnshire, Britain 1902

King Edward is a potato cultivar grown in the UK since 1902, making it one of the oldest cultivars still grown commercially.

== Appearance ==
The King Edward potato is predominantly white-skinned with pink colouration. It is mostly oval in shape, with a floury texture and shallow eyes. The plant is upright and tall with numerous stems and small green leaves. Its flowers are purple with white-tipped petals.

== History ==
In Redcliffe Salaman's book The History and Social Influence of the Potato first published in 1949, it was noted that parentage of King Edward was unknown. It was bred by a gardener in Northumberland who called it 'Fellside Hero' and passed into the hands of a grower in Yorkshire and in turn a potato merchant in Manchester who having no use for it passed it onto John Butler of Scotter in Lincolnshire. He in turn purchased all the seed stocks available and multiplied the variety on 50 acres (20 ha) of land before renaming the variety King Edward on the advice of a potato merchant.

The Coronation of King Edward VII in 1902 coincided with the introduction of this cultivar of potato and its name is believed to originate as a 'commemoration' of this occasion. It is claimed that the grower wrote to Buckingham Palace seeking permission to name his potato after the monarch and that a reply was received granting royal assent.

It is one of the oldest surviving cultivars in Europe.

== Cultivating ==
The King Edward potato is a main crop; in the UK it is traditionally planted in April for harvest in September. It is suitable to be grown both commercially and in allotments. It is very resistant to common scab and offers some resistance to potato blight but is susceptible to potato cyst nematode.

== Culinary ==
The King Edward has a variety of culinary uses and is renowned for its light fluffy texture; for this reason it is particularly suitable for roasting, mashed potato or baking, although it is also suitable for sautéing, steaming, and frying as chips. It has been described by Delia Smith as being the best potato with which to make gnocchi.
