= Dorset Cereals =

British manufacturer of breakfast cereals

- Company type: Division
- Industry: Food processing
- Founded: 1989; 37 years ago
- Founder: Terry Crabb
- Headquarters: Poole, Dorset, England
- Products: Breakfast cereals
- Owner: Associated British Foods
- Number of employees: 100+
- Parent: ABF Grain Products Limited
- Website: dorsetcereals.co.uk

Dorset Cereals is a British manufacturer of breakfast cereals, based in Poole in Dorset, England. The company was founded in 1989 by Terry Crabb and manufactures muesli, porridge, and granola. Its products are exported to more than 70 countries.

== History ==
Dorset Cereals was started by Terry Crabb from his garage in 1989. The company has experienced significant growth, especially in export markets. From 2000, the company was based at a purpose-built barn factory in Poundbury. In 2012, Associated British Foods purchased the company for £50 million from its private equity owners, Langholm Capital. The company is now part of The Jordans, Dorset & Ryvita Company subsidiary of ABF. In 2018 production moved to Poole.

The company runs the Dorset Cereals B&B Awards which recognises the best bed and breakfasts in the UK.

== Products ==
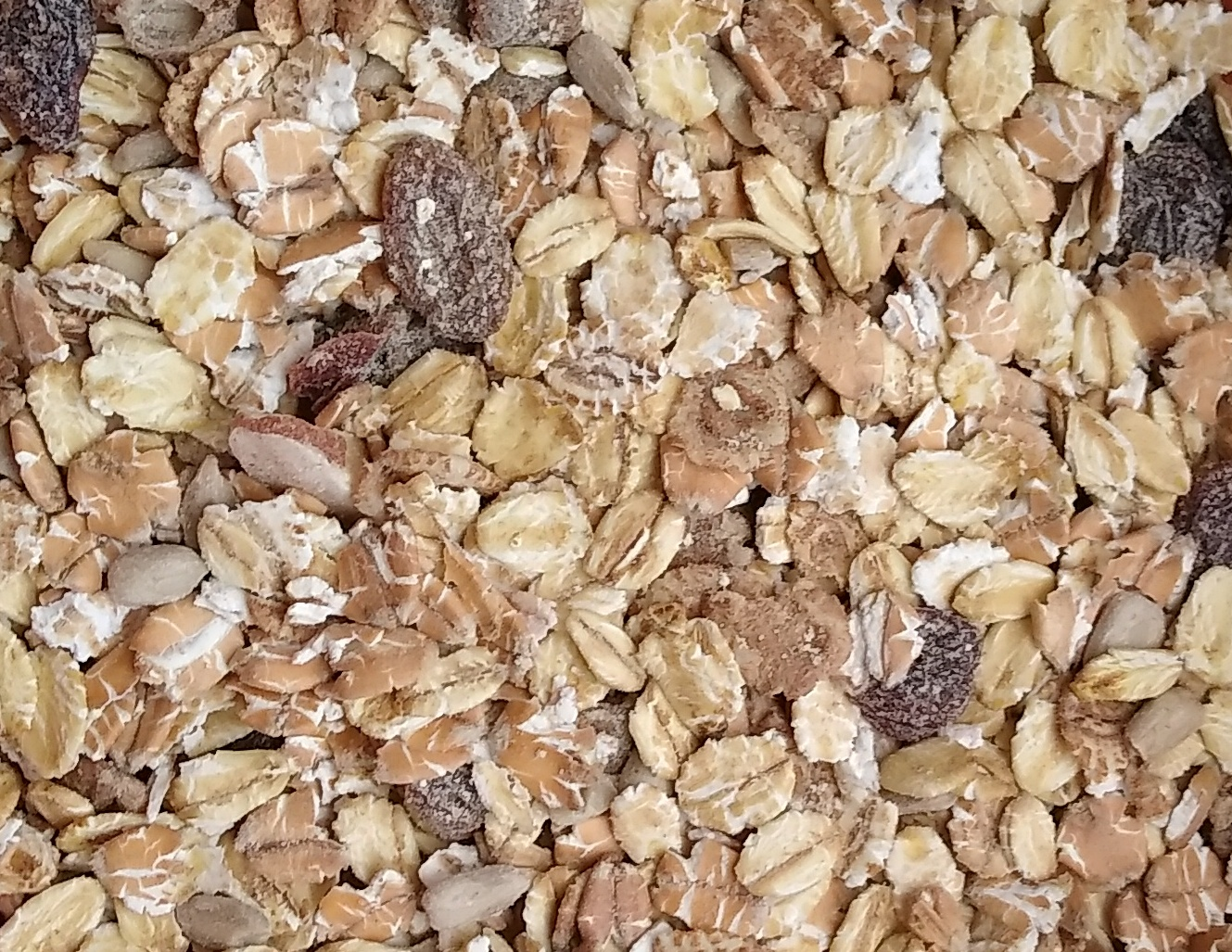
Dorset Cereals muesli

Before the move to Poole, Dorset Cereals manufactured its breakfast products, muesli, porridge and granola at its purpose-built barn in Poundbury, construction of which was overseen by Léon Krier. The company sources British oats, spelt and wheat flakes. Overall, 80% of its ingredients are sourced from the UK.

== Criticism ==
Health campaign group Action on Sugar has criticised the high levels of sugar in Dorset Cereals products and the failure of Dorset Cereals to adopt the colour-coded labelling recommended by the Department of Health or any front-of-pack nutrition labelling. Dorset Cereals responded that "We believe most people who eat our muesli understand that dried fruits, nuts, and seeds contain some naturally-occurring sugars and fats, but are also an excellent source of fibre and whole grain, as well as essential vitamins and minerals."

== Recognition ==
In 1999, Dorset Cereals won a Queen's Awards for Enterprise for Export Achievement. The company received second place in The Dieline packaging industry awards 2015 for fresh and prepared food.

Dorset Cereals products have also received several Great Taste Awards.
