= Canary creeper =

Canary creeper may refer to:

- Senecio tamoides, a South African vine
- Tropaeolum peregrinum, a South American vine
