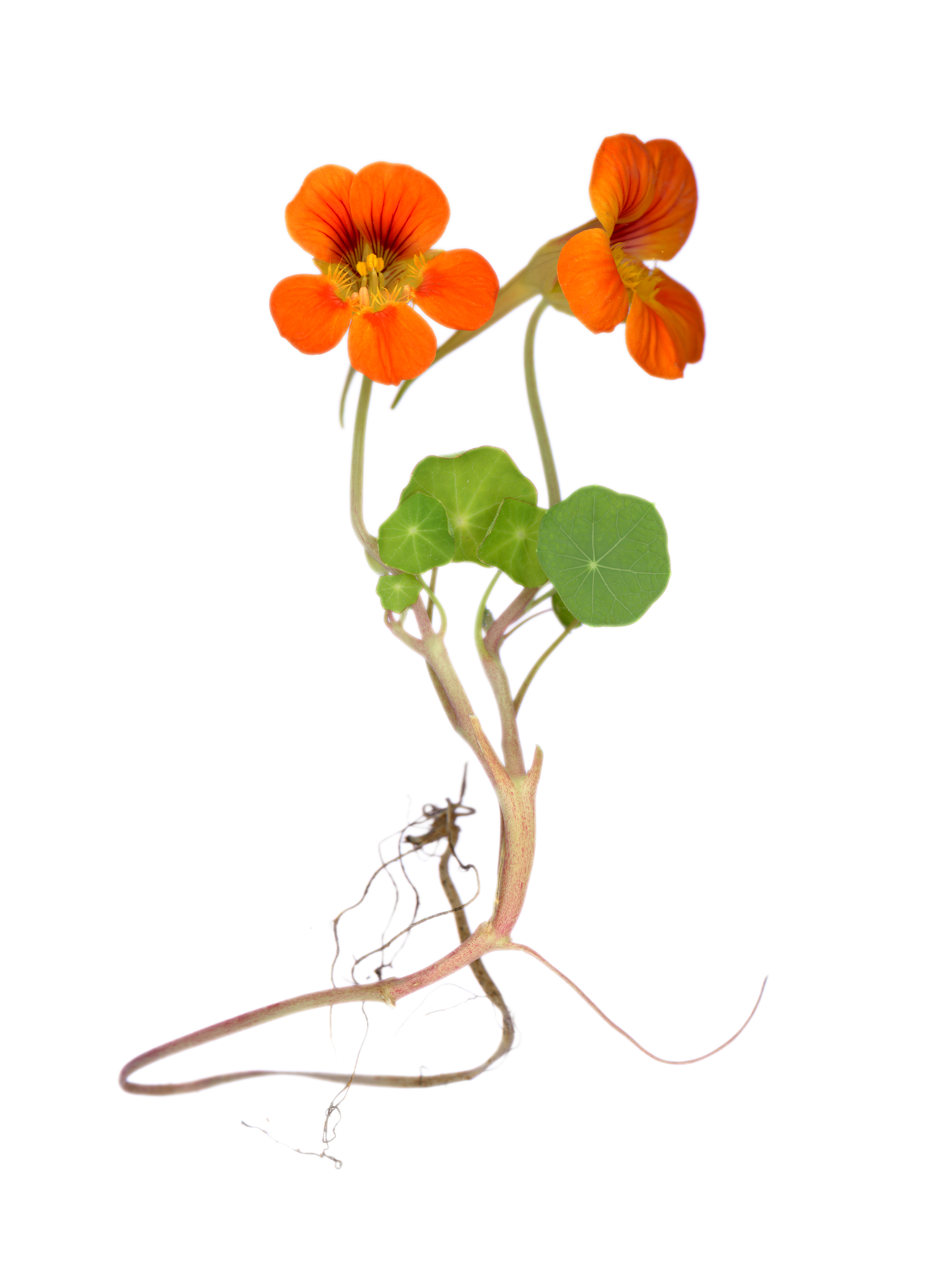
- Tropaeolum majus

Scientific classification
- Kingdom: Plantae
- Clade: Embryophytes
- Clade: Tracheophytes
- Clade: Spermatophytes
- Clade: Angiosperms
- Clade: Eudicots
- Clade: Rosids
- Order: Brassicales
- Family: Tropaeolaceae; Juss. ex DC.
- Genus: Tropaeolum; L.

Type species
- Tropaeolum majus L.

Species
- About 80 species, see text.

Synonyms
- Magallana Cav.; Trophaeastrum Sparre

= Tropaeolum =

Genus of flowering plants

Tropaeolum /trəˈpiːələm, troʊ-/, commonly known as nasturtium (/nəˈstɜːrʃəm, næ-/; literally "nose-twister" or "nose-tweaker"), is a genus of roughly 80 species of annual and perennial herbaceous flowering plants. It was named by Carl Linnaeus in his book Species Plantarum and is the only genus in the family Tropaeolaceae. The nasturtiums received their common name because they produce an oil similar to that of watercress (Nasturtium officinale).

The genus Tropaeolum, native to South and Central America, includes several very popular garden plants, the most common being T. majus, T. peregrinum and T. speciosum. One of the hardiest species is T. polyphyllum from Chile, the perennial roots of which can survive the winter underground at elevations of 3,300 metres (11,000 ft).

Plants in this genus have showy, often intensely bright flowers and rounded, peltate (shield-shaped) leaves with the petiole in the centre. The flowers are bisexual and zygomorphic, with five petals, a superior three-carpelled ovary, and a funnel-shaped nectar spur at the back, formed by modification of one of the five sepals.

== Description ==
Tropaeolum is a genus of dicotyledonous annual or perennial plants, often with somewhat succulent stems and sometimes tuberous roots. The alternate leaves are hairless, peltate, and entirely or palmately lobed. The petioles or leaf stalks are long and, in many species, can twine around other stems to provide support. The flowers are bisexual and showy, set singly on long stalks in the axils of the leaves. They have five sepals, the uppermost of which is elongated into a nectar spur. The five petals are clawed, with the lower three unlike the upper two. The eight stamens are in two whorls of unequal length, and the superior ovary has three segments and three stigmas on a single style. The fruit is naked and nut-like, with three single seed segments.

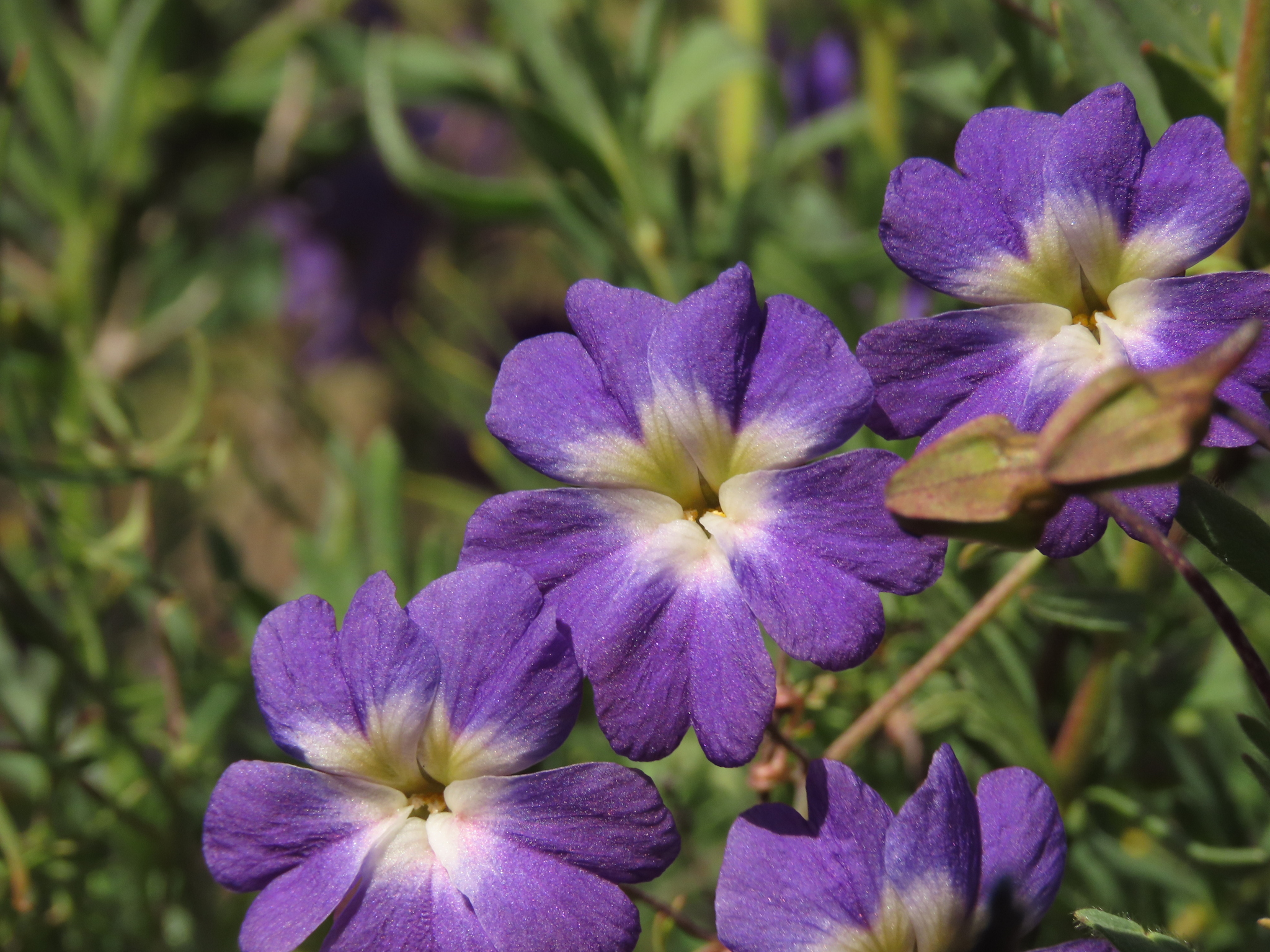
Tropaeolum azureum

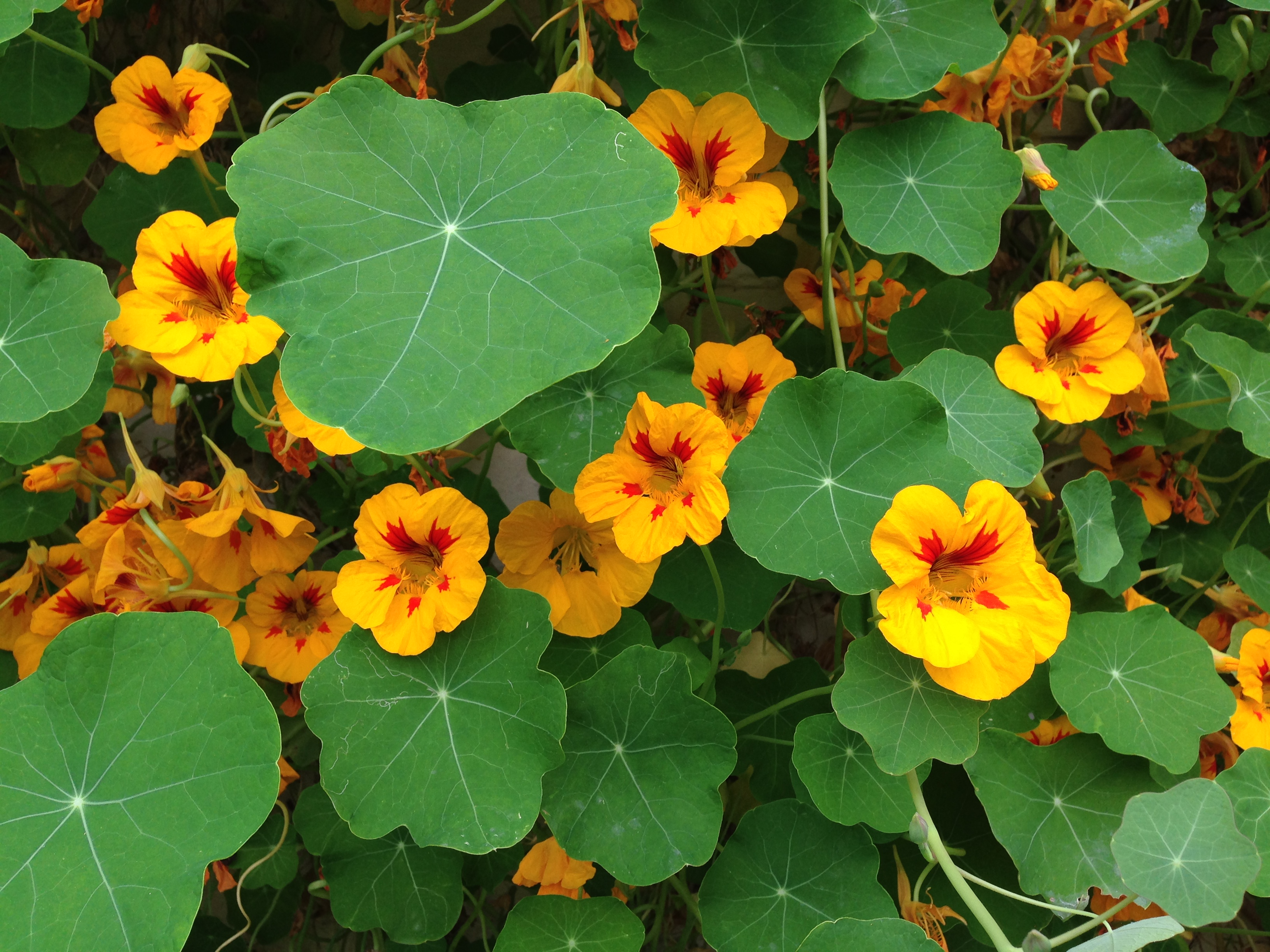
Flowering yellow and red T. majus

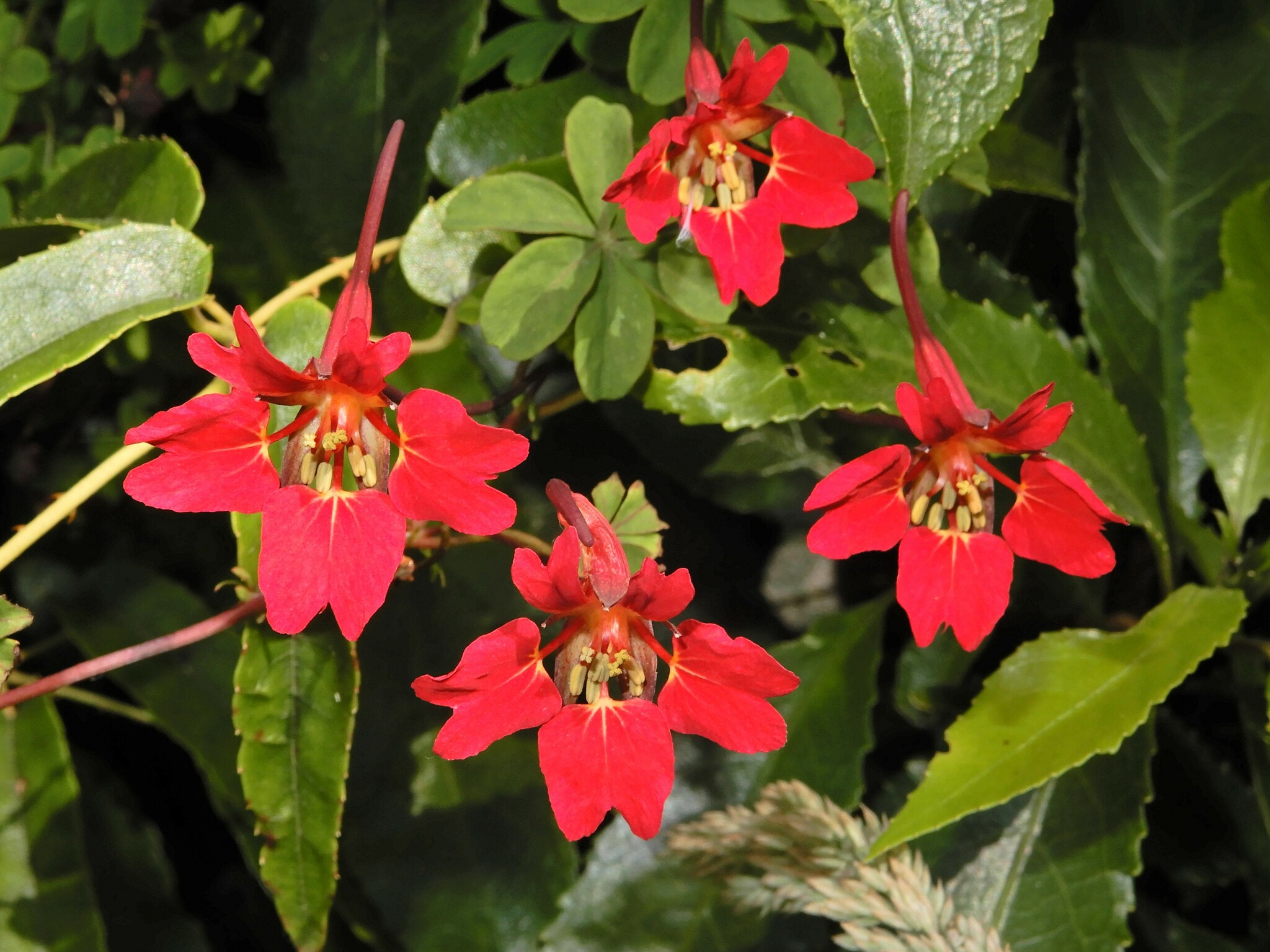
T. speciosum

== Taxonomy ==
Tropaeolum was named by Carl Linnaeus in his book Species Plantarum. He chose the genus name because T. majus reminded him of an ancient custom: After victory in battle, the Romans erected a trophy pole (or tropaeum, from the Greek tropaion, source of English "trophy") on which the vanquished foe's armour and weapons were hung. The plant's round leaves reminded Linnaeus of shields and its flowers of blood-stained helmets.

Tropaeolum was previously placed in the family Tropaeolaceae along with two other genera, Magallana Cav. and Trophaeastrum. The monotypic genus Magallana was characterised by having winged fruit, and the two species of Trophaeastrum lacked spurs. The genus Tropaeolum was diagnosed only by the absence of the characteristics of the other two genera. A molecular study undertaken in 2000 found Tropaeolum to be paraphyletic when the other two genera are segregated, so Magallana and Trophaeastrum were reduced to synonyms of Tropaeolum. Tropaeolaceae was thus rendered monogeneric, a family of only one genus.

The nasturtiums received their common name because they produce an oil similar to that of watercress (Nasturtium officinale).

=== Species ===
"The Plant List", a collaboration between the Missouri Botanical Garden and the Royal Botanic Gardens, Kew, includes the following accepted names of Tropaeolum species names. Some that are under review are here marked "U".

- Tropaeolum adpressum
- Tropaeolum albiflorum - U
- Tropaeolum argentinum
- Tropaeolum asplundii
- Tropaeolum atrocapillare
- Tropaeolum atrosanguineum - U
- Tropaeolum azureum
- Tropaeolum beuthii
- Tropaeolum bicolor
- Tropaeolum bogotense - U
- Tropaeolum boliviense - U
- Tropaeolum brachyceras
- Tropaeolum brasiliense
- Tropaeolum brideanum
- Tropaeolum buchenavianum - U
- Tropaeolum calcaratum
- Tropaeolum calvum
- Tropaeolum capillare
- Tropaeolum carchense
- Tropaeolum ciliatum
- Tropaeolum cirrhipes
- Tropaeolum cochabambae
- Tropaeolum concavum
- Tropaeolum concinneum - U
- Tropaeolum canariense
- Tropaeolum crenatiflorum
- Tropaeolum cubio - U
- Tropaeolum curvirostre - U
- Tropaeolum cuspidatum
- Tropaeolum dawei - U
- Tropaeolum deckerianum
- Tropaeolum denticualtum - U
- Tropaeolum dicolorum - U
- Tropaeolum dipetalum
- Tropaeolum elzae - U
- Tropaeolum emarginatum
- Tropaeolum ferreyrae
- Tropaeolum fintelmannii
- Tropaeolum flavipilum - U
- Tropaeolum garciae - U
- Tropaeolum harlingii
- Tropaeolum hayneanum
- Tropaeolum hirsutum - U
- Tropaeolum hirtifolium - U
- Tropaeolum hjertingii
- Tropaeolum hookerianum - U
- Tropaeolum hughesae - U
- Tropaeolum huigrense
- Tropaeolum incisum
- Tropaeolum integrifolium - U
- Tropaeolum jarrattii - U
- Tropaeolum jilesii
- Tropaeolum karstenii - U
- Tropaeolum kerneisinum
- Tropaeolum killipii - U
- Tropaeolum kingii
- Tropaeolum klotzschii - U
- Tropaeolum kuntzeanum
- Tropaeolum lasseri
- Tropaeolum lehmannii - U
- Tropaeolum leichtlinii - U
- Tropaeolum leonis
- Tropaeolum leptophyllum
- Tropaeolum lindenii - U
- Tropaeolum longiflorum
- Tropaeolum longifolium - U
- Tropaeolum looseri
- Tropaeolum macrophyllum - U
- Tropaeolum maculifolium - U
- Tropaeolum magnificum
- Tropaeolum majus
- Tropaeolum marginatum
- Tropaeolum menispermifolium
- Tropaeolum mexiae - U
- Tropaeolum meyeri
- Tropaeolum minus
- Tropaeolum moritzianum
- Tropaeolum morreanum - U
- Tropaeolum myriophyllum
- Tropaeolum naudinii - U
- Tropaeolum nuptae-jucundae
- Tropaeolum orinocense
- Tropaeolum orthoceras - U
- Tropaeolum oxalidanthum - U
- Tropaeolum papillosum
- Tropaeolum parvifolium - U
- Tropaeolum pellucidum - U
- Tropaeolum peltophorum
- Tropaeolum pendulum
- Tropaeolum pentagonum
- Tropaeolum pentaphyllum
- Tropaeolum peregrinum
- Tropaeolum polyphyllum
- Tropaeolum popelari - U
- Tropaeolum porifolium
- Tropaeolum pubescens
- Tropaeolum purpureum
- Tropaeolum reichianum - U
- Tropaeolum reineckeanum - U
- Tropaeolum repandum - U
- Tropaeolum rhizophorum - U
- Tropaeolum rhomboideum
- Tropaeolum sanctae-catharinae
- Tropaeolum scheuerianum - U
- Tropaeolum schillingii - U
- Tropaeolum schlimii - U
- Tropaeolum seemannii
- Tropaeolum sessilifolium
- Tropaeolum smithii
- Tropaeolum sparrei - U
- Tropaeolum speciosum
- Tropaeolum steyermarkianum
- Tropaeolum stipulatum
- Tropaeolum tenellum - U
- Tropaeolum tenuirostre - U
- Tropaeolum traceyae - U
- Tropaeolum trialatum
- Tropaeolum trialatum
- Tropaeolum tricolor
- Tropaeolum tricolori-brachyceras - U
- Tropaeolum trilobum
- Tropaeolum trilobum
- Tropaeolum tuberosum
- Tropaeolum umbellatum
- Tropaeolum unilobatum - U
- Tropaeolum wagnerianum
- Tropaeolum warmingianum
- Tropaeolum warscewiczii - U
- Tropaeolum willinkii

== Cultivation ==
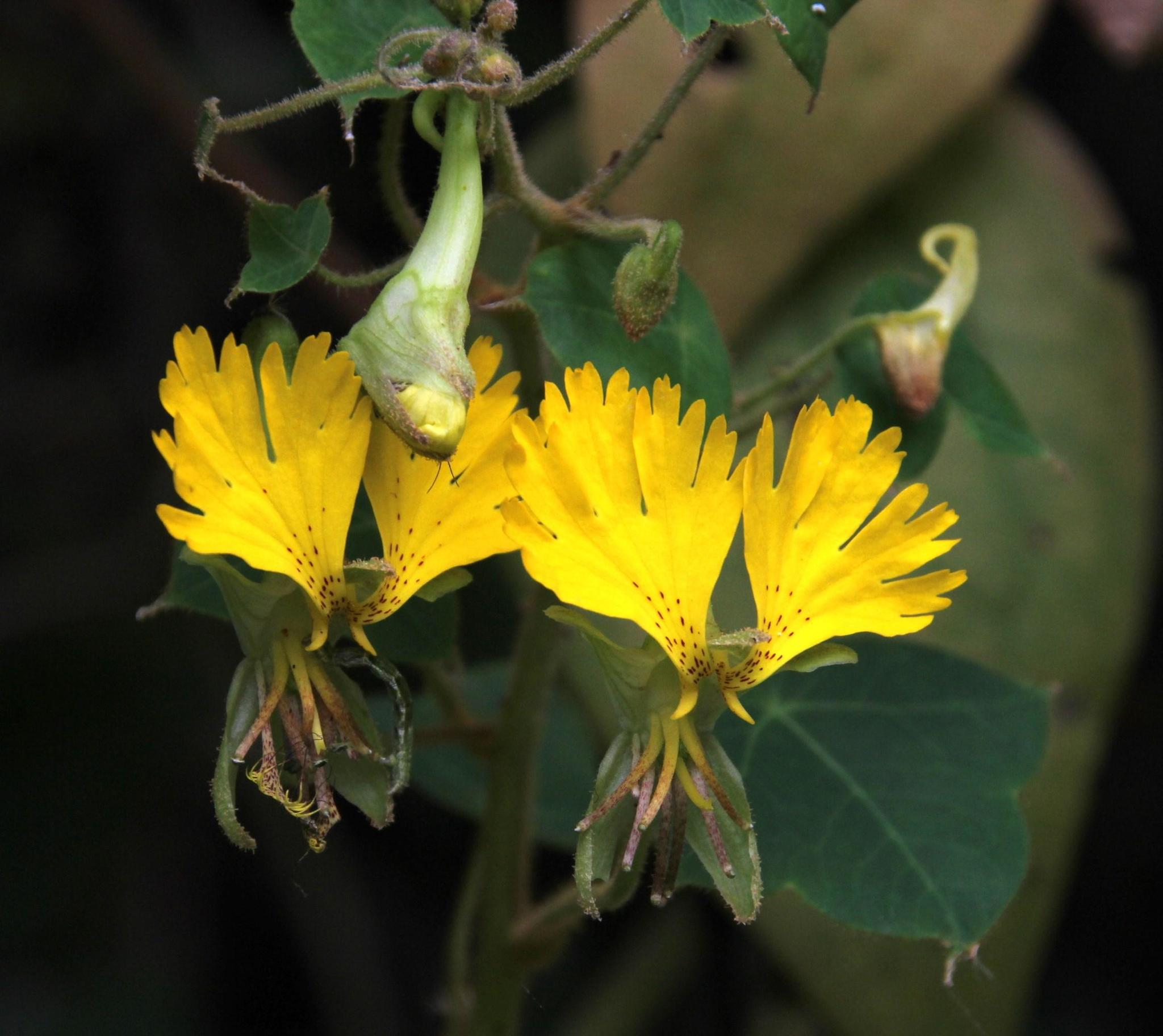
Tropaeolum peregrinum

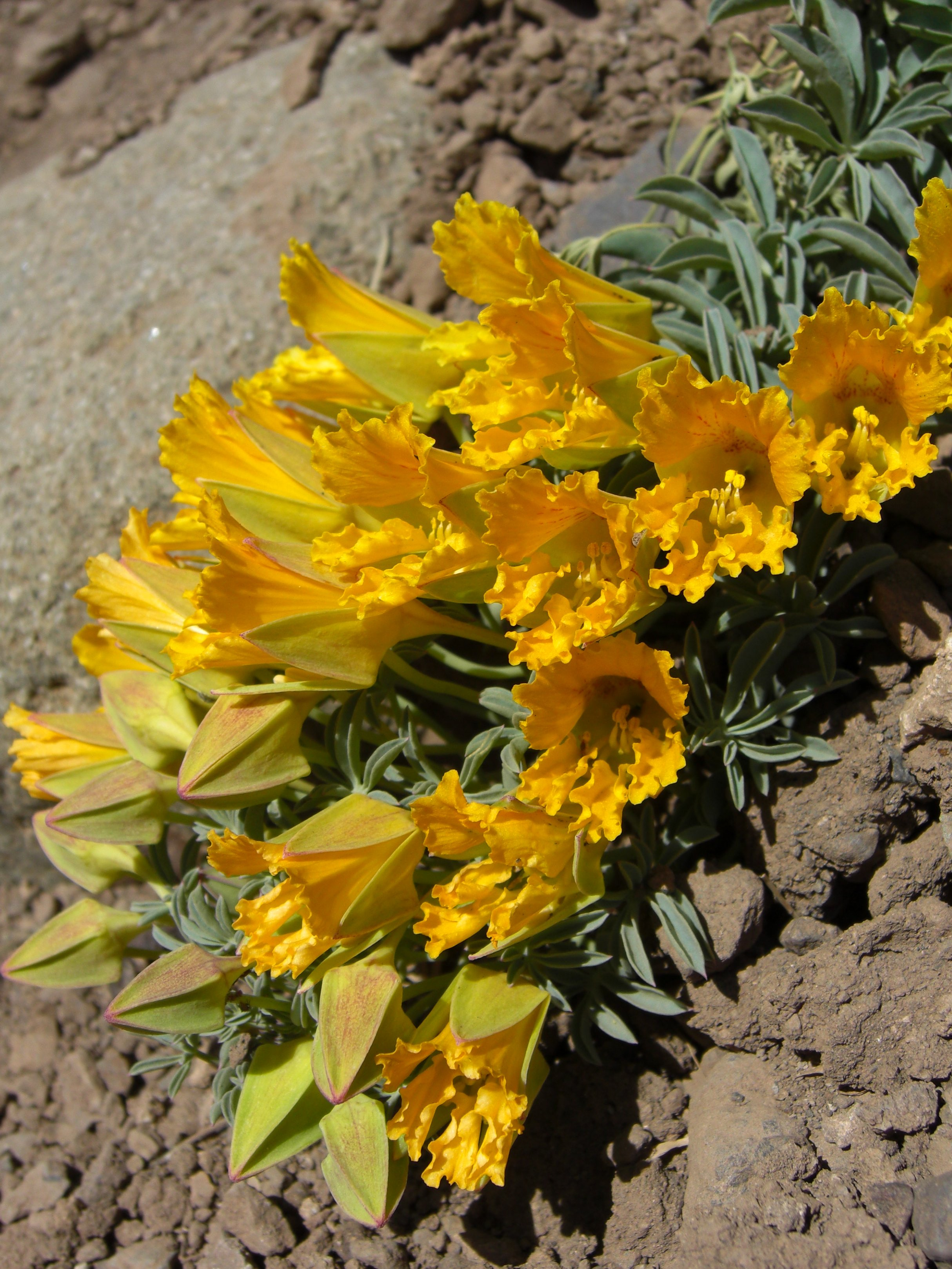
Tropaeolum polyphyllum

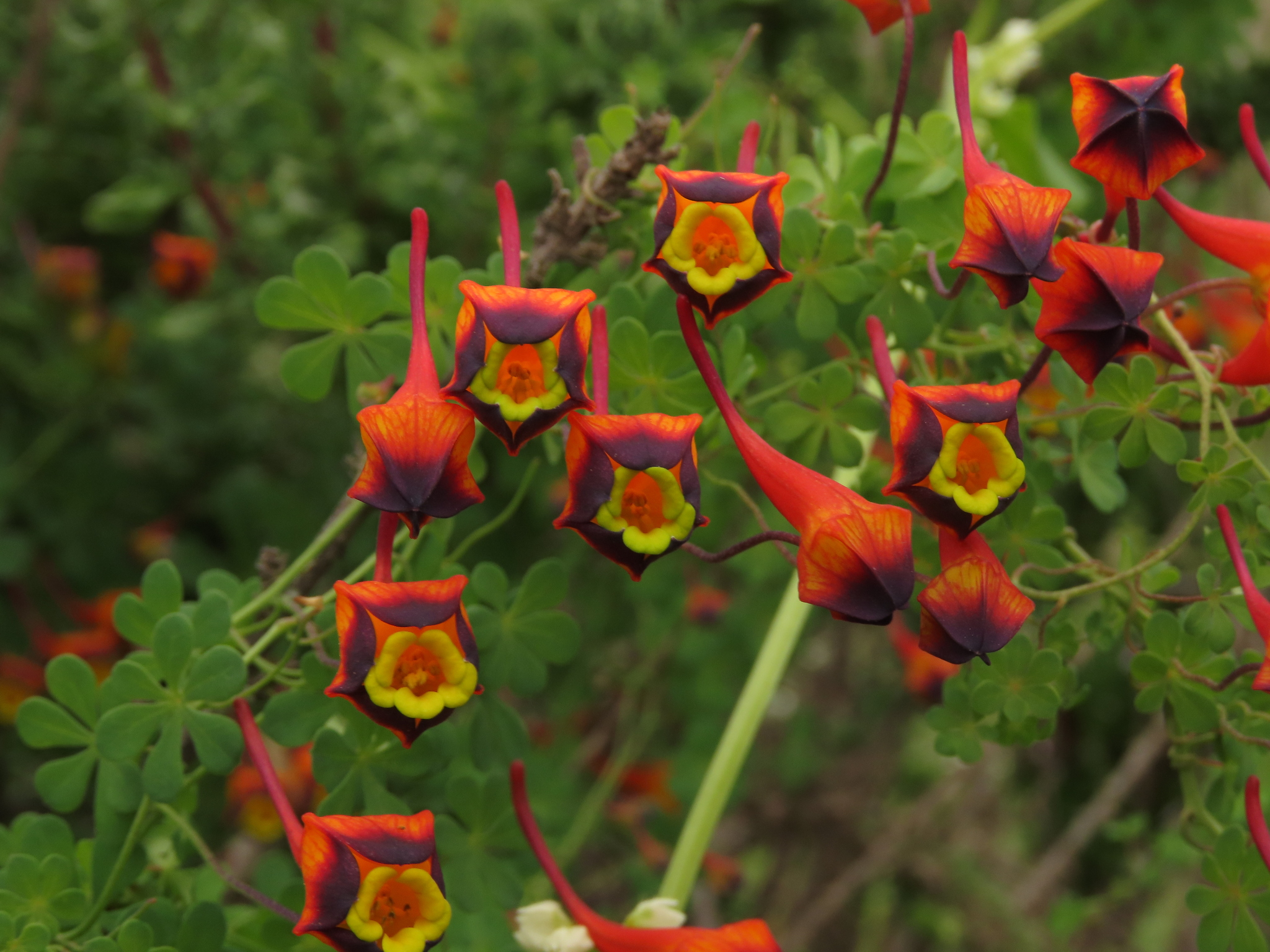
Tropaeolum tricolor

The most common flower in cultivation is a hybrid of T. majus, T. minus, and T. peltophorum. It is commonly known as the nasturtium (and occasionally anglicized as nasturtian). It is mostly grown from seed as a half-hardy annual, and both single and double varieties are available. It comes in various forms and colours, including cream, yellow, orange and red, solid in colour or striped and often with a dark blotch at the base of the petals. It is vigorous and easily grown and does well in sun. It thrives in poor soil and dry conditions, whereas rich soil produces much leafy growth and few flowers. Some varieties adopt a bush form while others scramble over and through other plants and are useful for planting in awkward spots or for covering fences and trellises.

The following cultivars have gained the Royal Horticultural Society's Award of Garden Merit:

- 'Alaska Series'
- 'Hermine Grashoff'
- 'Whirlybird Series'

The blue nasturtium (Tropaeolum azureum) is a tender species from Chile which has violet-blue flowers with white eyes that can be as much as 4 cm (1 1/2 in) across.

Tropaeolum brachyceras has 2.5 cm (1 in) yellow flowers with purplish markings on wiry, climbing stems. It is a half-hardy perennial from Chile and may remain dormant for several years before being sparked into growth by some unknown trigger factor.

Tropaeolum hookerianum is a tuberous-rooted species from Chile. There are two subspecies, T. h. austropurpureum which has violet-purple flowers and T. h. pilosum with yellow flowers.

The Canary creeper (Tropaeolum peregrinum) is a trailing and climbing half-hardy annual species with wiry stalks and palmately lobed leaves. The pale yellow, fringed flowers are borne on long stalks. It originated from Peru but may first have been cultivated in the Canary Islands before being introduced into Western Europe.

Wreath nasturtium (Tropaeolum polyphyllum) is a prostrate plant originating from Argentina and Chile. It has silvery, deeply lobed leaves and a profusion of small, bright yellow flowers on long trailing stalks. After flowering, the plant dies back. It is a perennial with underground rhizomes which send up new shoots at intervals. It will survive for several years in a suitable sunny location with well-drained soil. It is a very hardy species; the tubers can grow at depths of 60 cm (24 in) enabling the plant to survive at altitudes of as much as 3,300 metres (10,000 ft) in the Andes.

The flame flower (Tropaeolum speciosum) is well adapted to cool, moist climates and famously does well in Scotland. It sends up shoots that thread their way through hedges and shrubs and, when they emerge into the light, bear brilliant red flowers among small, five or six-lobed leaves. It is difficult to establish but is an attractive garden plant when it thrives. This plant has gained the Royal Horticultural Society's Award of Garden Merit.

Three-coloured Indian cress (Tropaeolum tricolor) is another tuberous, climbing species grown for its attractive red, purple and yellow tubular flowers. It comes from Chile and Bolivia and is a reliable winter-growing species.

Mashua (Tropaeolum tuberosum) is a perennial climbing plant from the Andes grown for its tuberous roots. It has been cultivated since ancient times, and depictions of it are found at archaeological sites pre-dating the Incas. It has leaves with five to seven lobes and small, long-spurred, red and yellow flowers. The tubers have an unpleasant smell when raw, which disappears on cooking. It is frost-hardy and produces crops of 30 tonnes per hectare at an elevation of 3,000 metres (9,800 ft) above sea level. The cultivar T. tuberosum lineamaculatum 'Ken Aslet' has gained the Royal Horticultural Society's Award of Garden Merit.

Species originating from the coastal areas and lower foothills make most of their growth in winter, whereas the true alpine species are summer growers. Tuberous Tropaeolum species are well known for occasionally remaining dormant for one or more years. The species with underground rhizomes and tubers can be propagated from these, while other species are best raised from seed. Many growers favour fresh seed, but dried seed is also often successful. Seed from the winter growing species should be sown in the autumn, while the summer growing species are best sown in the spring in well-drained compost and covered with 1 to 2 cm (1/2 to 3/4 in) of grit or sand. The containers should be kept at below 4 °C (39 °F) until the seedlings appear in about a month, as too high a temperature inhibits germination.

== Uses ==
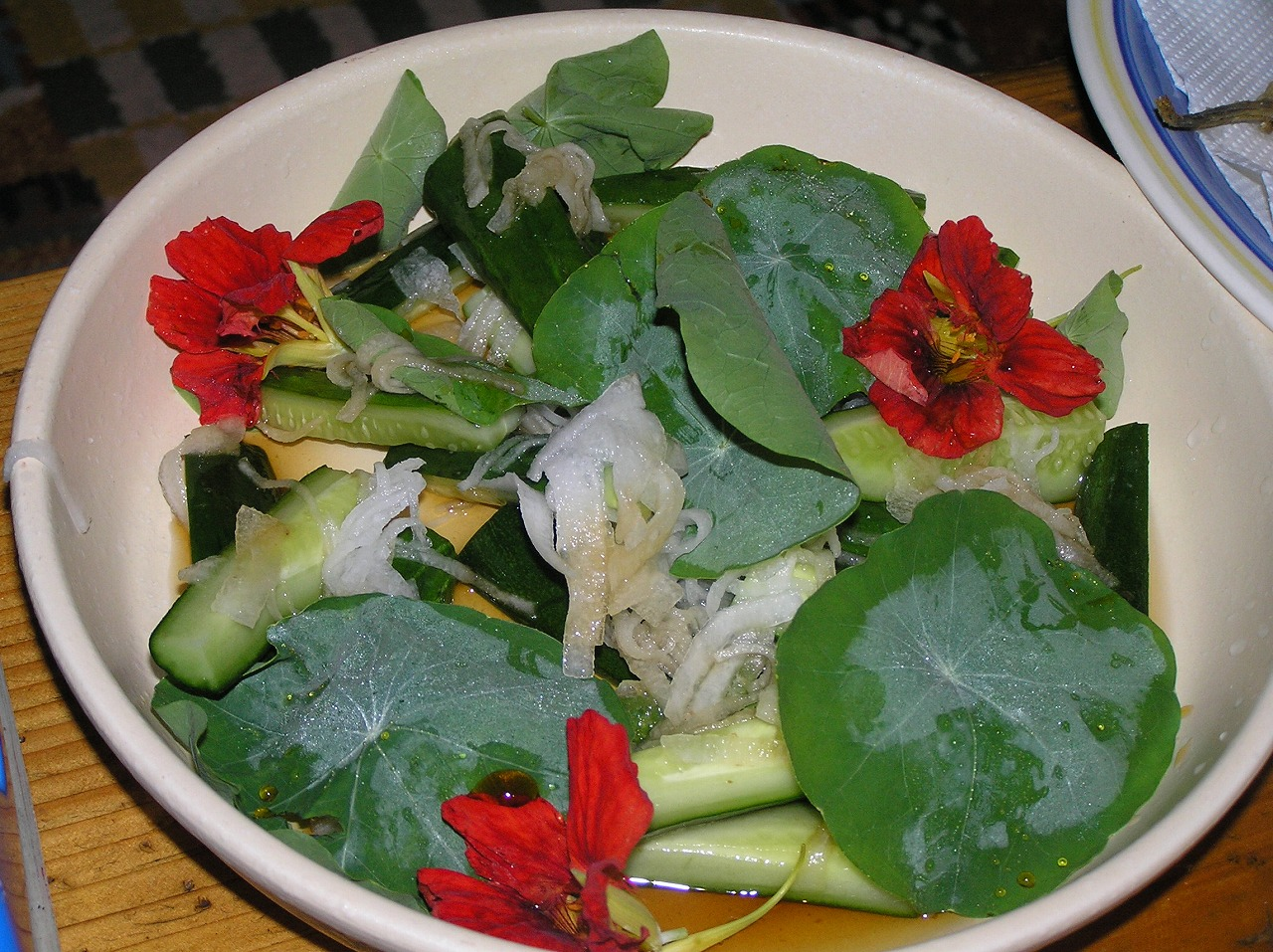
Salad with flowers and leaves

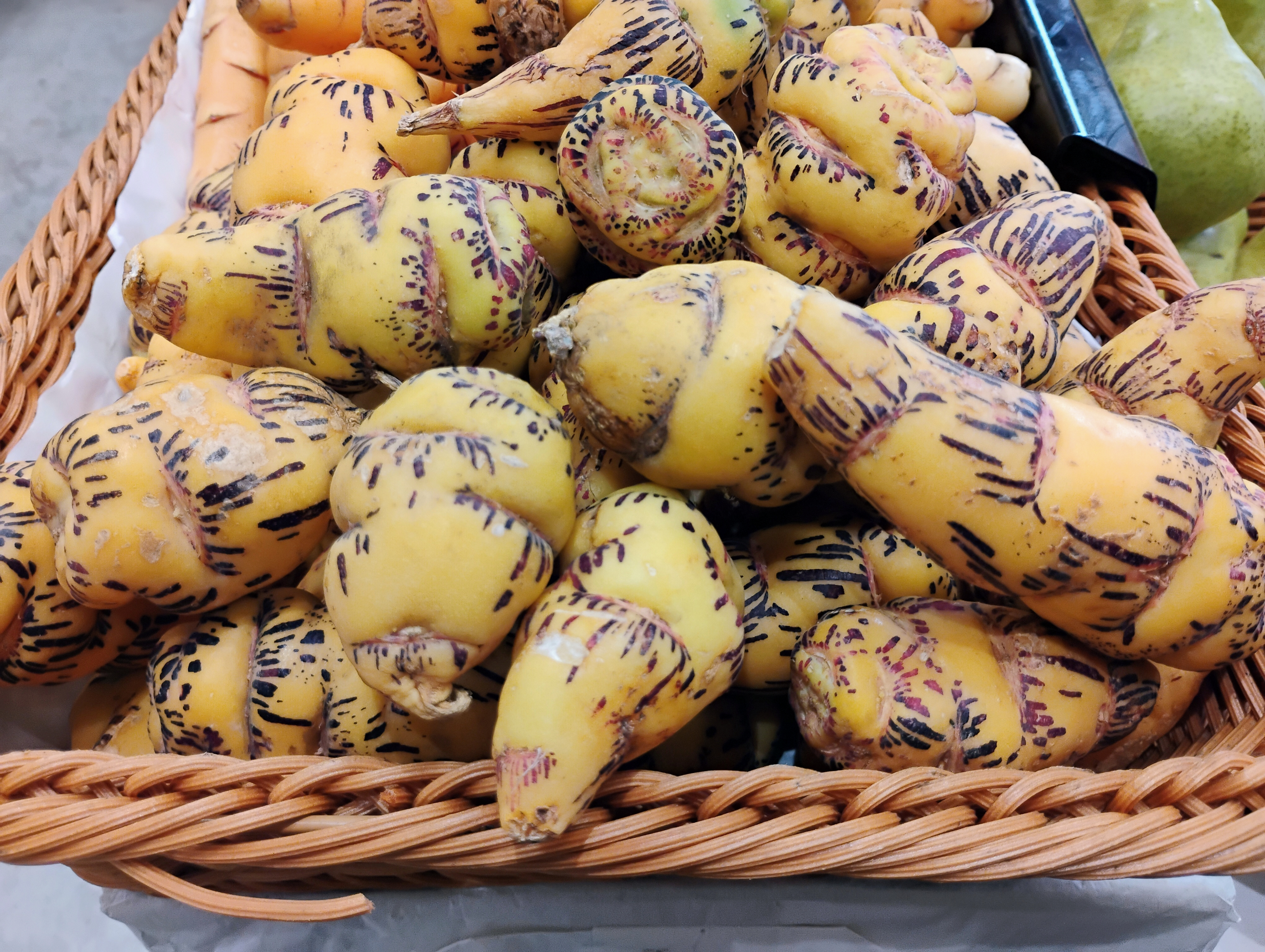
T. tuberosum tubers

=== Culinary ===
All parts of T. majus are edible. The flower has most often been consumed, making for an especially ornamental salad ingredient; it has a slightly peppery taste reminiscent of watercress and is also used in stir fry. The flowers contain about 130 mg vitamin C per 100 grams (3 1/2 oz), about the same amount as is contained in parsley. Moreover, they contain up to 45 mg of lutein per 100 g, which is the highest amount found in any edible plant. The unripe seed pods can be harvested and dropped into seasoned vinegar to produce a condiment and garnish, sometimes used in place of capers.

Mashua (T. tuberosum) produces an edible underground tuber that is a major food source in parts of the Andes.

=== Herbal medicine ===
T. majus has been used in herbal medicine for respiratory and urinary tract infections.

In Germany, licensed physicians can prescribe the herbal antibiotic Angocin Anti-Infekt N, made from only nasturtium and horseradish root.

=== Other uses ===
Nasturtiums are used as companion plants for biological pest control, repelling some pests, acting as a trap crop for others and attracting predatory insects.

== In culture ==
Tropaeolum was introduced into Spain by the Spanish botanist Nicolás Monardes, who described it in his Historia medicinal de las cosas que se traen de nuestras Indias Occidentales of 1569, translated into English as Ioyfull newes out of the newe founde worlde by John Frampton. The English herbalist John Gerard reports having received seeds of the plant from Europe in his 1597 book Herball, or Generall Historie of Plantes. Nasturtiums were once commonly called "Indian cresses" because they were introduced from the Americas, known popularly then as the Indies, and used like cress as salad ingredients. In his herbal, John Gerard compared the flowers of the "Indian Cress" to those of the forking larkspur (Consolida regalis) of the buttercup family. He wrote: "Unto the backe part (of the flower) doth hange a taile or spurre, such as hath the Larkes heele, called in Latine Consolida regalis."

J. R. R. Tolkien commented that an alternative anglicization of "nasturtium" was "nasturtian".
