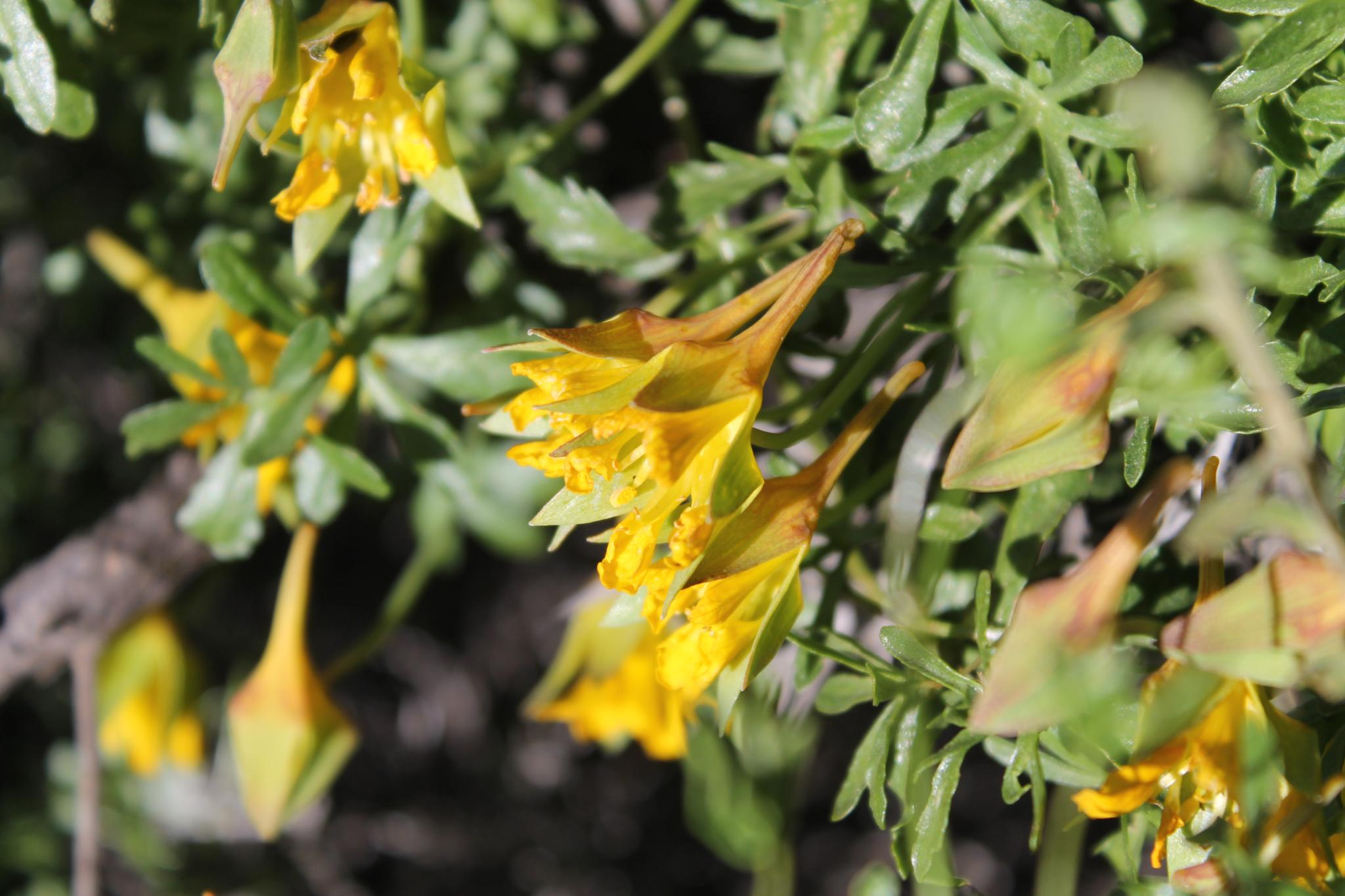

Scientific classification
- Kingdom: Plantae
- Clade: Tracheophytes
- Clade: Angiosperms
- Clade: Eudicots
- Clade: Rosids
- Order: Brassicales
- Family: Tropaeolaceae
- Genus: Tropaeolum
- Species: T. myriophyllum

Binomial name
- Tropaeolum myriophyllum (Poepp. & Endl.) Sparre

= Tropaeolum myriophyllum =

Species of plant

Tropaeolum myriophyllum is a species of flowering plant. It is endemic to Chile.
