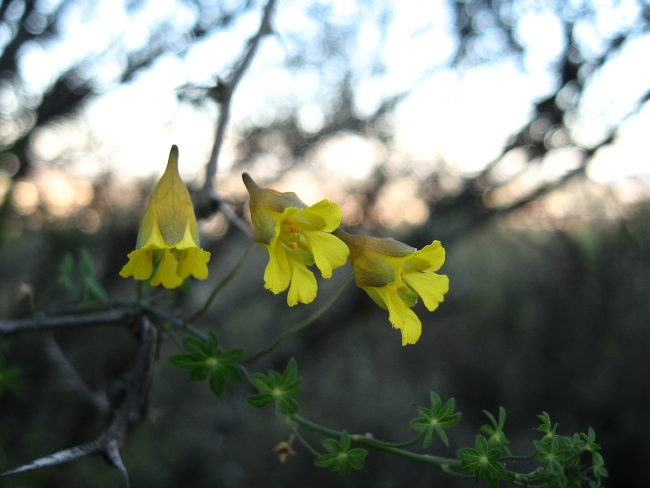

Scientific classification
- Kingdom: Plantae
- Clade: Embryophytes
- Clade: Tracheophytes
- Clade: Spermatophytes
- Clade: Angiosperms
- Clade: Eudicots
- Clade: Rosids
- Order: Brassicales
- Family: Tropaeolaceae
- Genus: Tropaeolum
- Species: T. brachyceras

Binomial name
- Tropaeolum brachyceras Hook. & Arn. (1830)

Synonyms
- Chymocarpus brachyceras (Hook. & Arn.) Heynh.; Tropaeolum brachyceras var. grandiflorum A.Reinecke ex Walp.; Tropaeolum brachyceras var. sulphureum Walp.; Tropaeolum chilense Bertero ex Colla; Tropaeolum minimum Miers [Invalid]; Tropaeolum tenellum G.Don; Trophaeum brachyceras (Hook. & Arn.) Kuntze; Trophaeum chilense (Bertero ex Colla) Kuntze; Trophaeum tenellum (G.Don) Kuntze

= Tropaeolum brachyceras =

Species of flowering plant

Tropaeolum brachyceras is a species of perennial plant in the Tropaeolaceae family. It is endemic to mountainous regions of Chile.
