= Tropaeolum argentinum =

Scientific classification
- Kingdom: Plantae
- Clade: Tracheophytes
- Clade: Angiosperms
- Clade: Eudicots
- Clade: Rosids
- Order: Brassicales
- Family: Tropaeolaceae
- Genus: Tropaeolum
- Species: T. argentinum

Binomial name
- Tropaeolum argentinum Buchenau

Species of flowering plant

Tropaeolum argentinum is a climbing or scrambling plant from Argentina with yellow feathery flowers. It was introduced to cultivation in 2007 by plant collectors John Watson and Anita Flores Watson.
