= Tropaeolum papillosum =

Conservation status
- Vulnerable (IUCN 3.1)

Scientific classification
- Kingdom: Plantae
- Clade: Tracheophytes
- Clade: Angiosperms
- Clade: Eudicots
- Clade: Rosids
- Order: Brassicales
- Family: Tropaeolaceae
- Genus: Tropaeolum
- Species: T. papillosum

Binomial name
- Tropaeolum papillosum Hughes

Species of flowering plant

Tropaeolum papillosum is a species of plant in the Tropaeolaceae family. It is endemic to Ecuador. Its natural habitat is subtropical or tropical moist montane forests.
