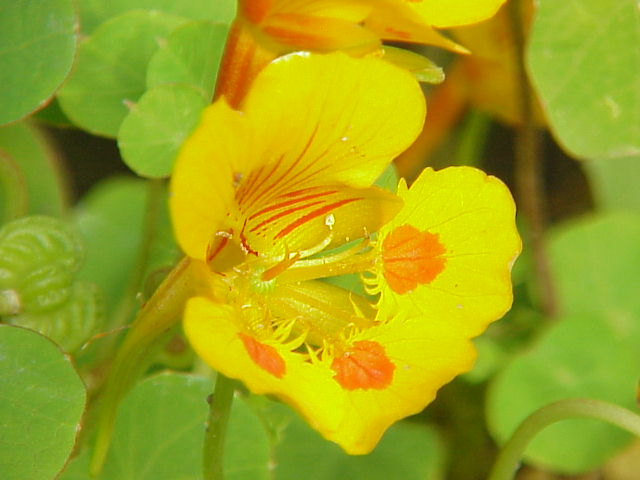

Scientific classification
- Kingdom: Plantae
- Clade: Tracheophytes
- Clade: Angiosperms
- Clade: Eudicots
- Clade: Rosids
- Order: Brassicales
- Family: Tropaeolaceae
- Genus: Tropaeolum
- Species: T. minus

Binomial name
- Tropaeolum minus L.

= Tropaeolum minus =

Species of flowering plant

Tropaeolum minus, the dwarf nasturtium is a species of perennial plant in the Tropaeolaceae family. It is endemic to mountainous regions of Ecuador and Peru.
