= Tropaeolum carchense =

Conservation status
- Endangered (IUCN 3.1)

Scientific classification
- Kingdom: Plantae
- Clade: Tracheophytes
- Clade: Angiosperms
- Clade: Eudicots
- Clade: Rosids
- Order: Brassicales
- Family: Tropaeolaceae
- Genus: Tropaeolum
- Species: T. carchense

Binomial name
- Tropaeolum carchense Killip ex Sparre

Species of flowering plant

Tropaeolum carchense is a species of plant in the Tropaeolaceae family. It is endemic to Ecuador. Its natural habitat is subtropical or tropical high-altitude grassland.
