= Tropaeolum beuthii =

Scientific classification
- Kingdom: Plantae
- Clade: Tracheophytes
- Clade: Angiosperms
- Clade: Eudicots
- Clade: Rosids
- Order: Brassicales
- Family: Tropaeolaceae
- Genus: Tropaeolum
- Species: T. beuthii

Binomial name
- Tropaeolum beuthii Klotzsch

Species of flowering plant

Tropaeolum beuthii is a species of flowering plant in the family Tropaeolaceae, native to Northern Chile. Growing to 1 m (3.3 ft) in height, it is a tuberous summer-dormant climber. It belongs to the same genus as the more familiar annual nasturtium of gardens, Tropaeolum majus.

This plant is cultivated for its yellow trumpet-shaped flowers, appearing in winter and spring. Each flower has a pale green calyx with a long spur. As it does not tolerate freezing temperatures, it can only be grown outdoors in the mildest parts of the UK. Otherwise it must be grown under glass. It has gained the Royal Horticultural Society's Award of Garden Merit.
