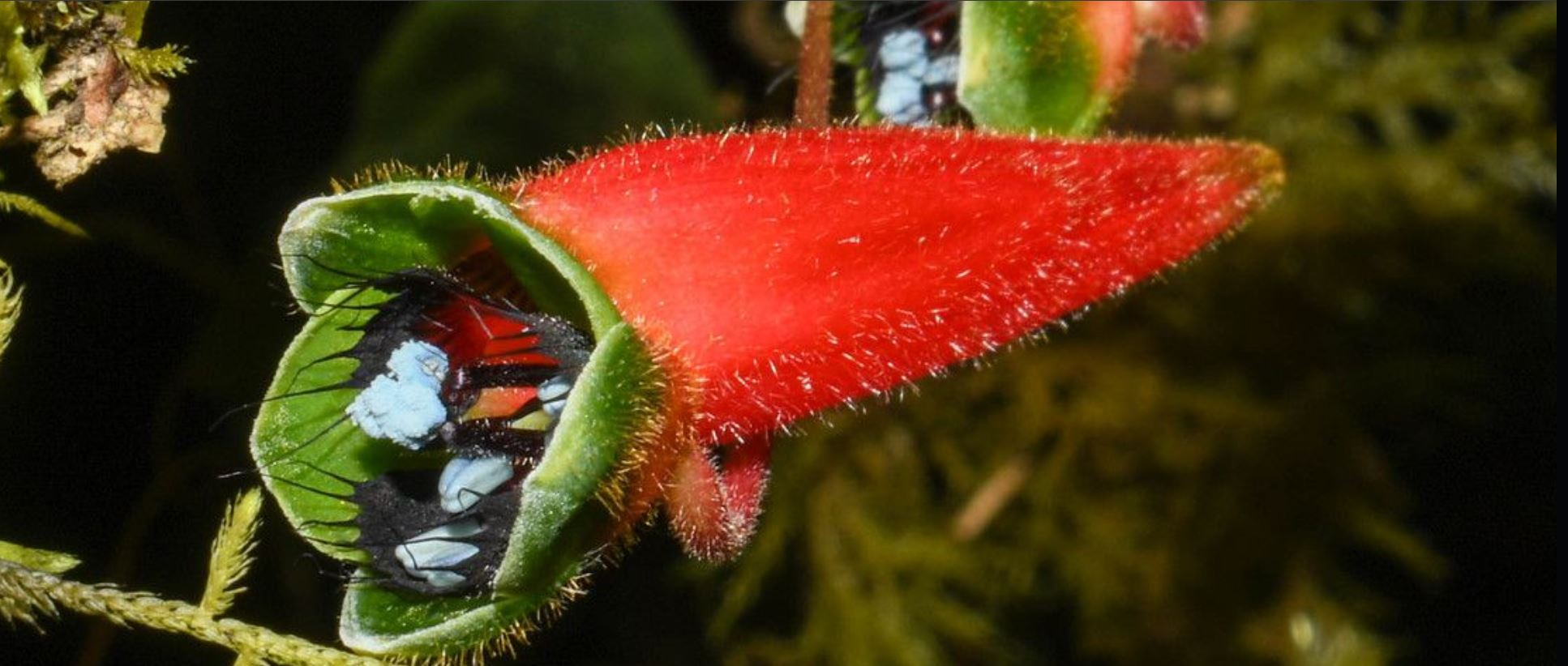

Scientific classification
- Kingdom: Plantae
- Clade: Tracheophytes
- Clade: Angiosperms
- Clade: Eudicots
- Clade: Rosids
- Order: Brassicales
- Family: Tropaeolaceae
- Genus: Tropaeolum
- Species: T. adpressum

Binomial name
- Tropaeolum adpressum Hughes, 1922

= Tropaeolum adpressum =

Species of flowering plant

Tropaeolum adpressum is a flowering plant in the family Tropaeolaceae. It is commonly known as nasturtium. The plant is native to Colombia and Ecuador. The flowers have a red cone shaped body with green petals. The body of adpressum is covered in fine hair-like structures. Adpressum can be found from 700 to 3,000 m (2,300 to 9,800 ft).
