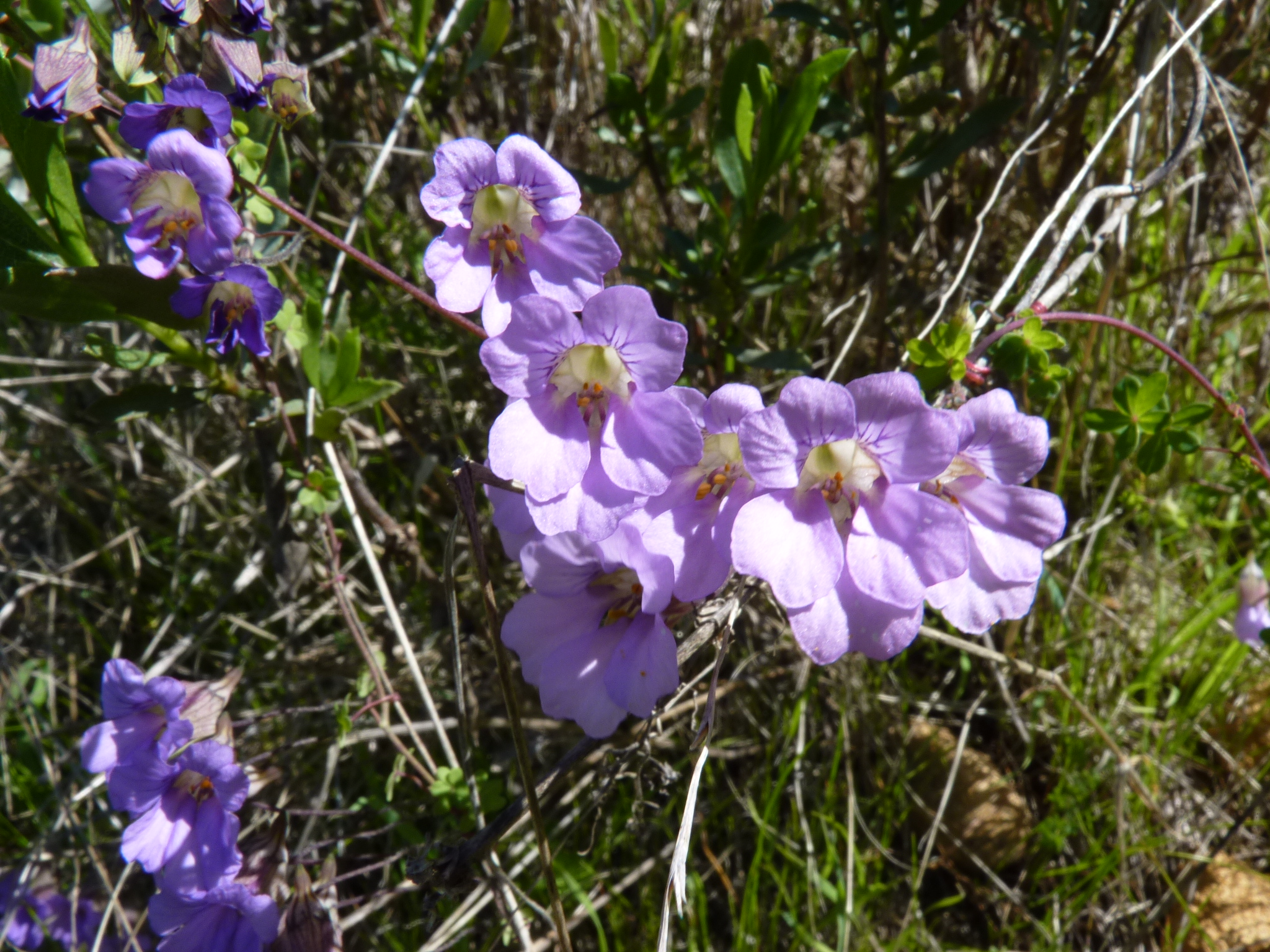

Scientific classification
- Kingdom: Plantae
- Clade: Tracheophytes
- Clade: Angiosperms
- Clade: Eudicots
- Clade: Rosids
- Order: Brassicales
- Family: Tropaeolaceae
- Genus: Tropaeolum
- Species: T. hookerianum

Binomial name
- Tropaeolum hookerianum Barnéoud 1845[1846]

= Tropaeolum hookerianum =

Species of flowering plant

Tropaeolum hookerianum is a species of perennial plant in the Tropaeolaceae family. It is found in Chile.
