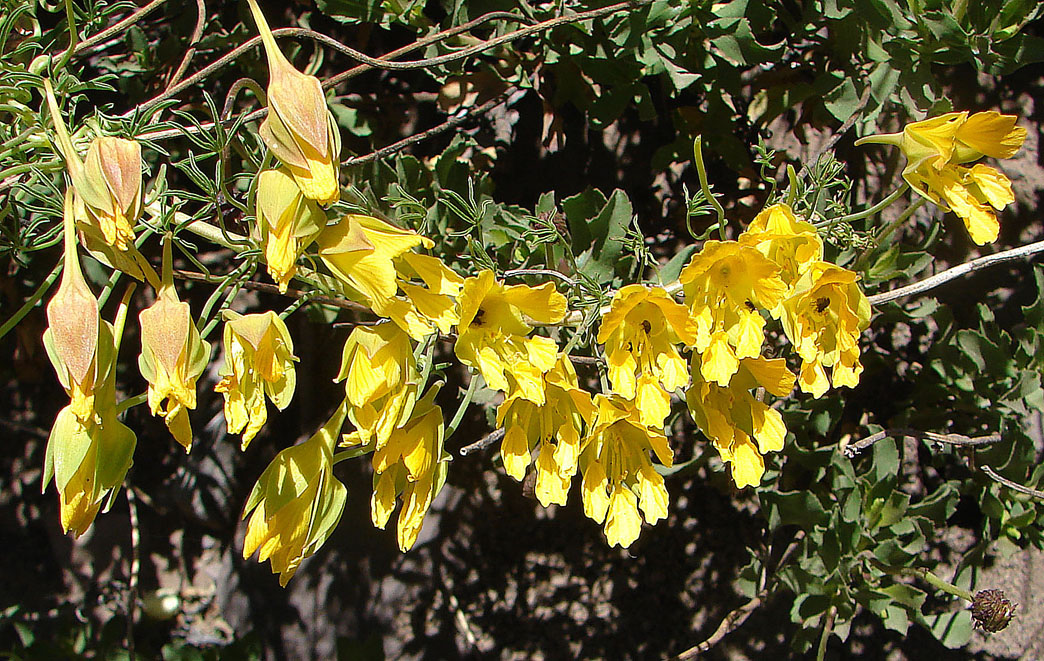

Scientific classification
- Kingdom: Plantae
- Clade: Tracheophytes
- Clade: Angiosperms
- Clade: Eudicots
- Clade: Rosids
- Order: Brassicales
- Family: Tropaeolaceae
- Genus: Tropaeolum
- Species: T. leptophyllum

Binomial name
- Tropaeolum leptophyllum G. Don

= Tropaeolum leptophyllum =

Species of plant

Tropaeolum leptophyllum is a perennial climber in the Tropaeolaceae family. It is endemic to mountainous regions of Chile.
