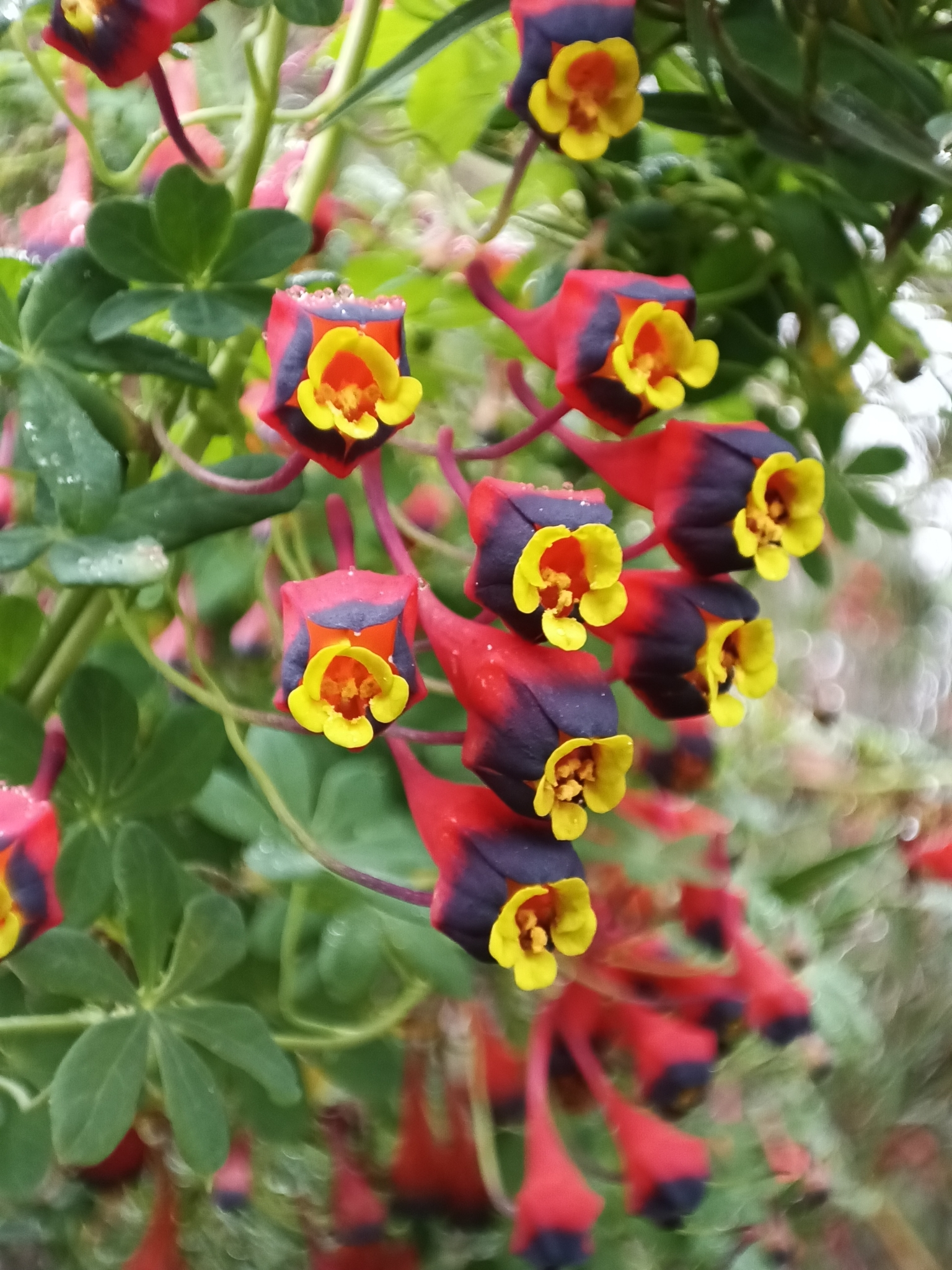
- In Chile

Scientific classification
- Kingdom: Plantae
- Clade: Tracheophytes
- Clade: Angiosperms
- Clade: Eudicots
- Clade: Rosids
- Order: Brassicales
- Family: Tropaeolaceae
- Genus: Tropaeolum
- Species: T. tricolor

Binomial name
- Tropaeolum tricolor Sweet

= Tropaeolum tricolor =

Species of plant

Tropaeolum tricolor, the three-coloured Indian cress or Chilean nasturtium, is a species of perennial plant in the family Tropaeolaceae. It is endemic to Chile, where it is called soldadito rojo and relicario.

== Description ==
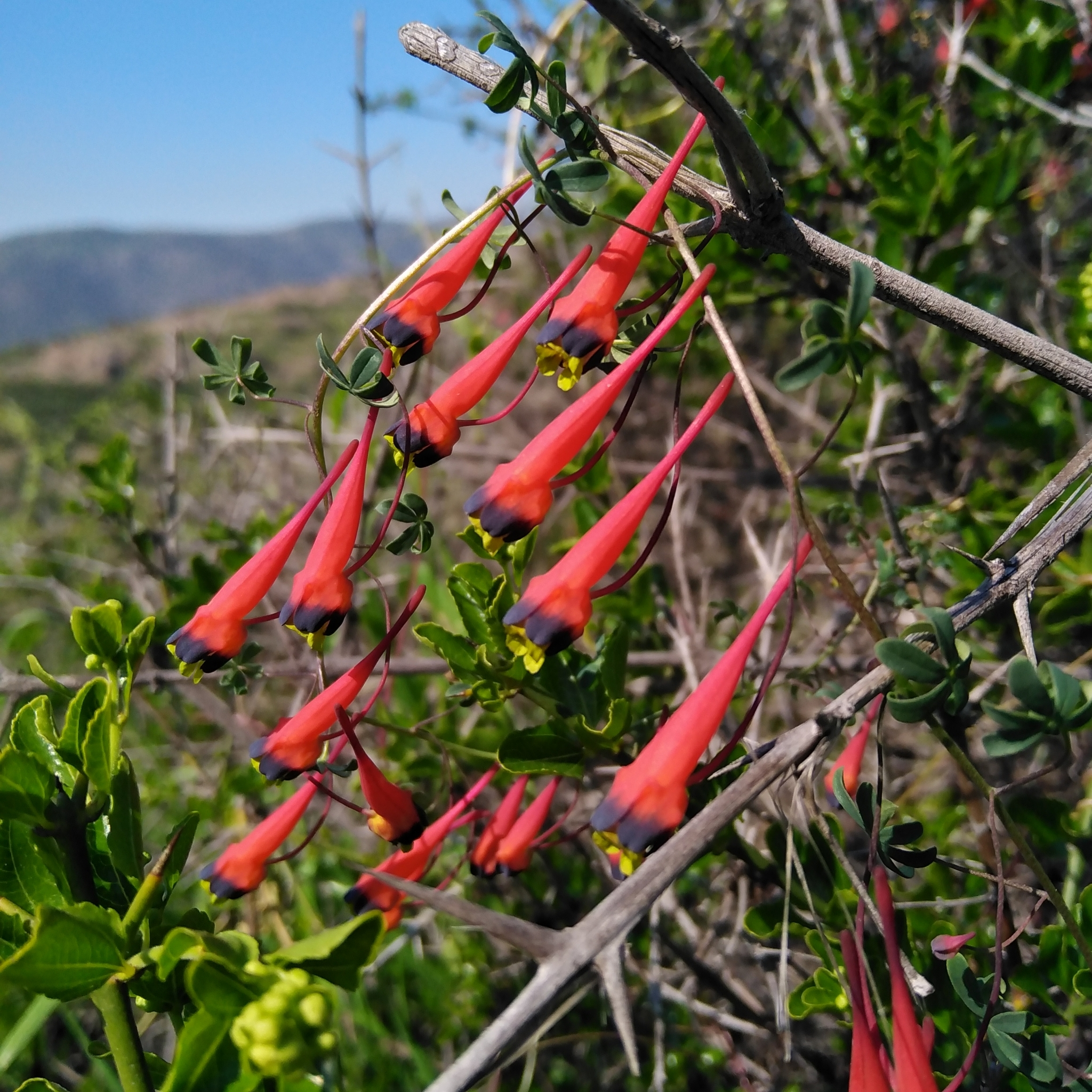
Side view, showing the nectar spurs

Tropaeolum tricolor is a summer-dormant climber which flowers from winter to spring. It has thin, straggly stems growing from a reddish coloured root tuber and extending up to 2 or 3 metres (6 ft 7 in or 9 ft 10 in). The leaves are peltate (with the stalk in the centre), nearly circular with five or six deeply cut lobes. The numerous flowers are borne singly on long wiry stalks growing from the axils of the leaves. They are narrowly funnel-shaped and about 3 centimetres (1.2 in) long. The five sepals are red, orange or yellow tipped with a purple band, and extending backwards in a red spur. The small, greenish-yellow rounded petals have a clawed base. The sepals turn brown after the flowers fall and enclose the two or three, dark brown seeds.

== Distribution and habitat ==
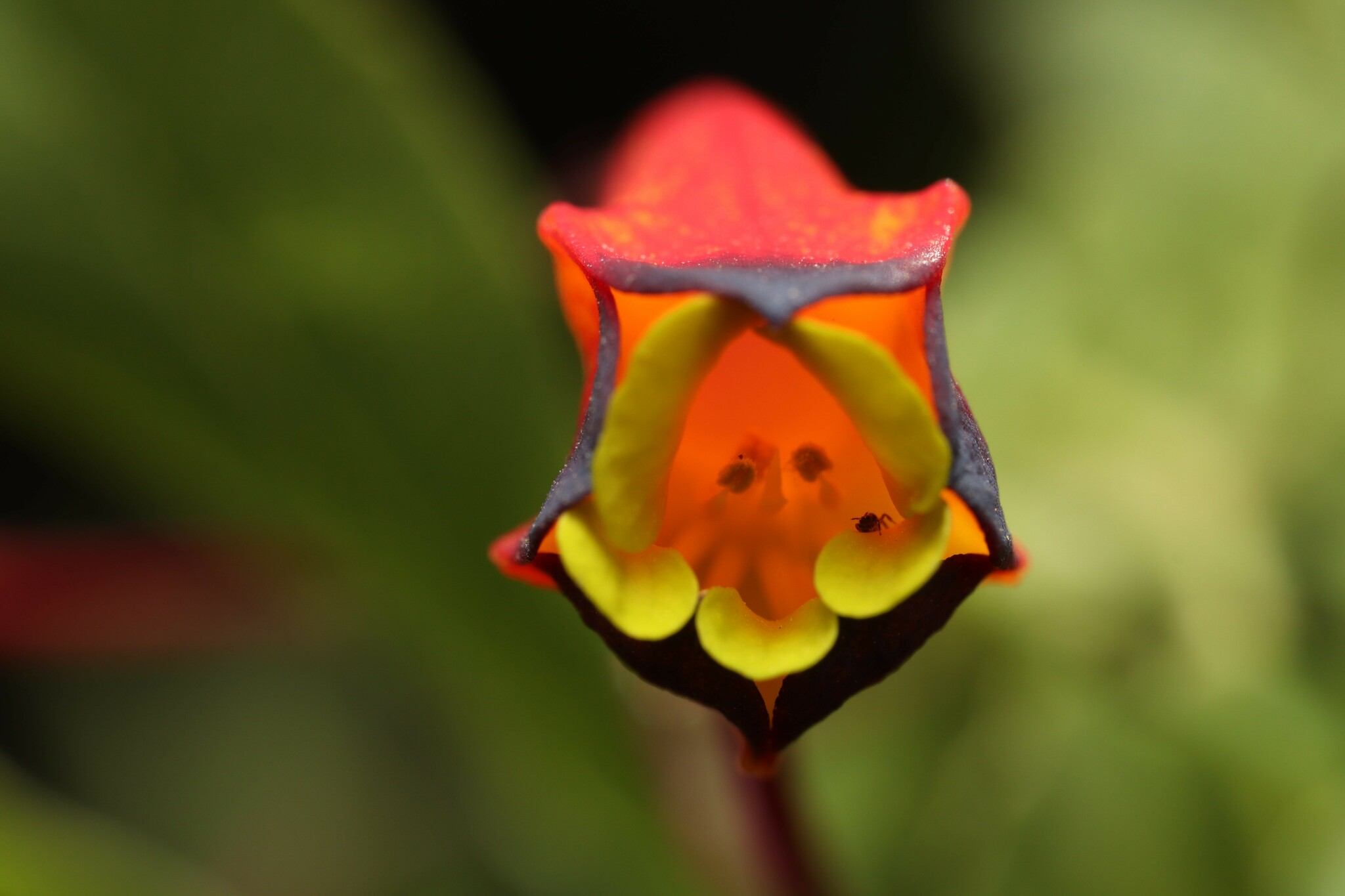
Close up

Three-coloured Indian cress grows in the cloud forest on the coastal mountains of northern Chile at 300 to 900 metres (980 to 2,950 ft). Further south it grows in inland temperate forests in the central and Los Lagos regions at varying heights. Here it grows on level ground or north facing slopes in full sun or dappled shade. It can endure periods of drought of up to 10 months in the summer. The tubers are well buried and are hardy down to a temperature of about −8 °C (18 °F) and can tolerate short periods of snow cover.

== Cultivation ==
At the Royal Botanic Gardens at Kew, England, three-coloured Indian cress is grown in a frost-free Alpine house. Large pots with good drainage are filled with a loam-based compost and tubers are replanted each September. The plant soon starts into growth and flowers begin forming in the spring and the plant remains in flower for several months. Propagation is by seed or from the tubers which are often formed at the very bottom of a pot or force their way out through the drainage holes. The USDA Hardiness Zone is 8. In cultivation in the UK, it does not tolerate being frozen, so in all but the mildest locations it must be grown under glass. It has gained the Royal Horticultural Society's Award of Garden Merit.

== Gallery ==
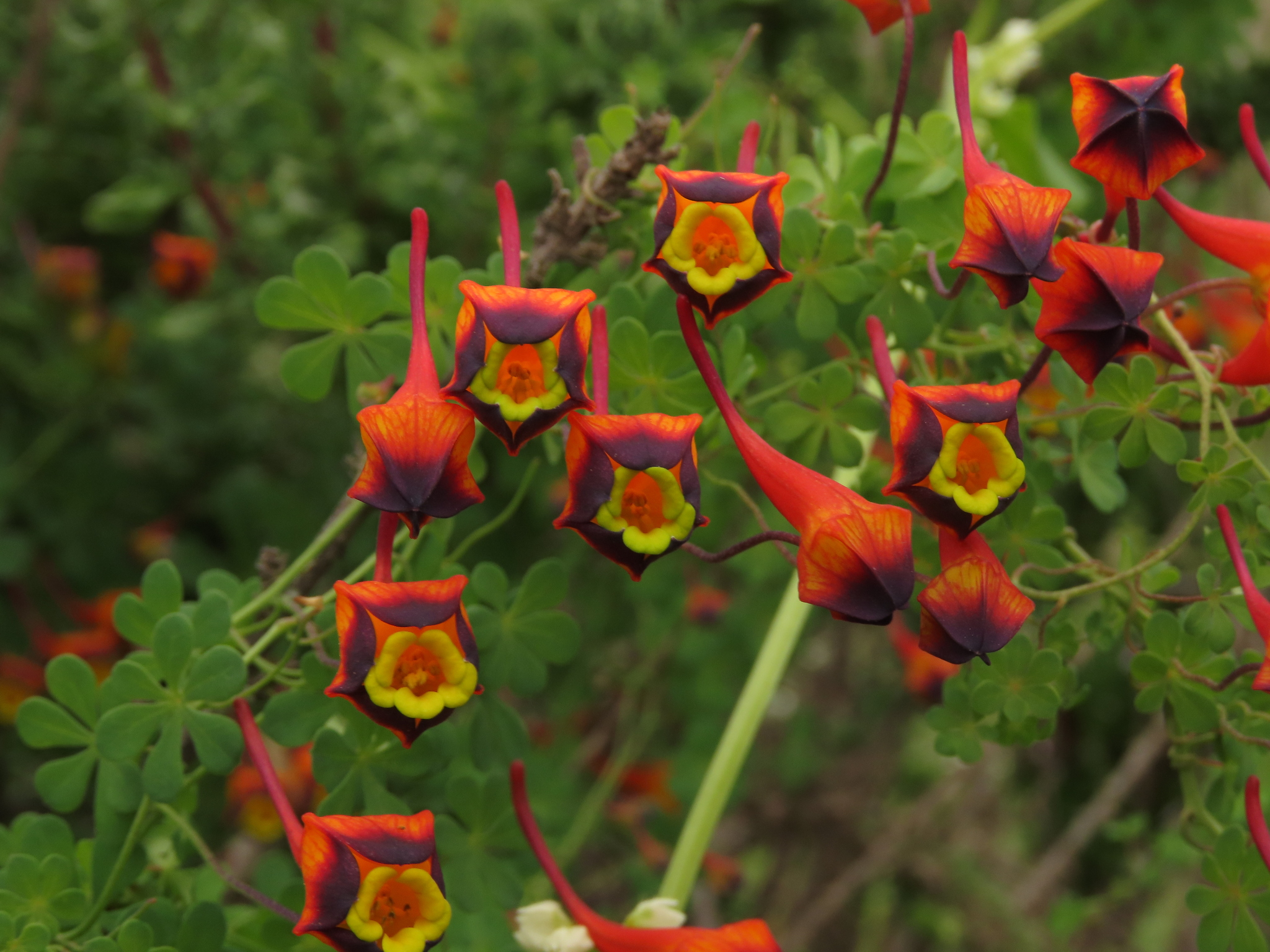

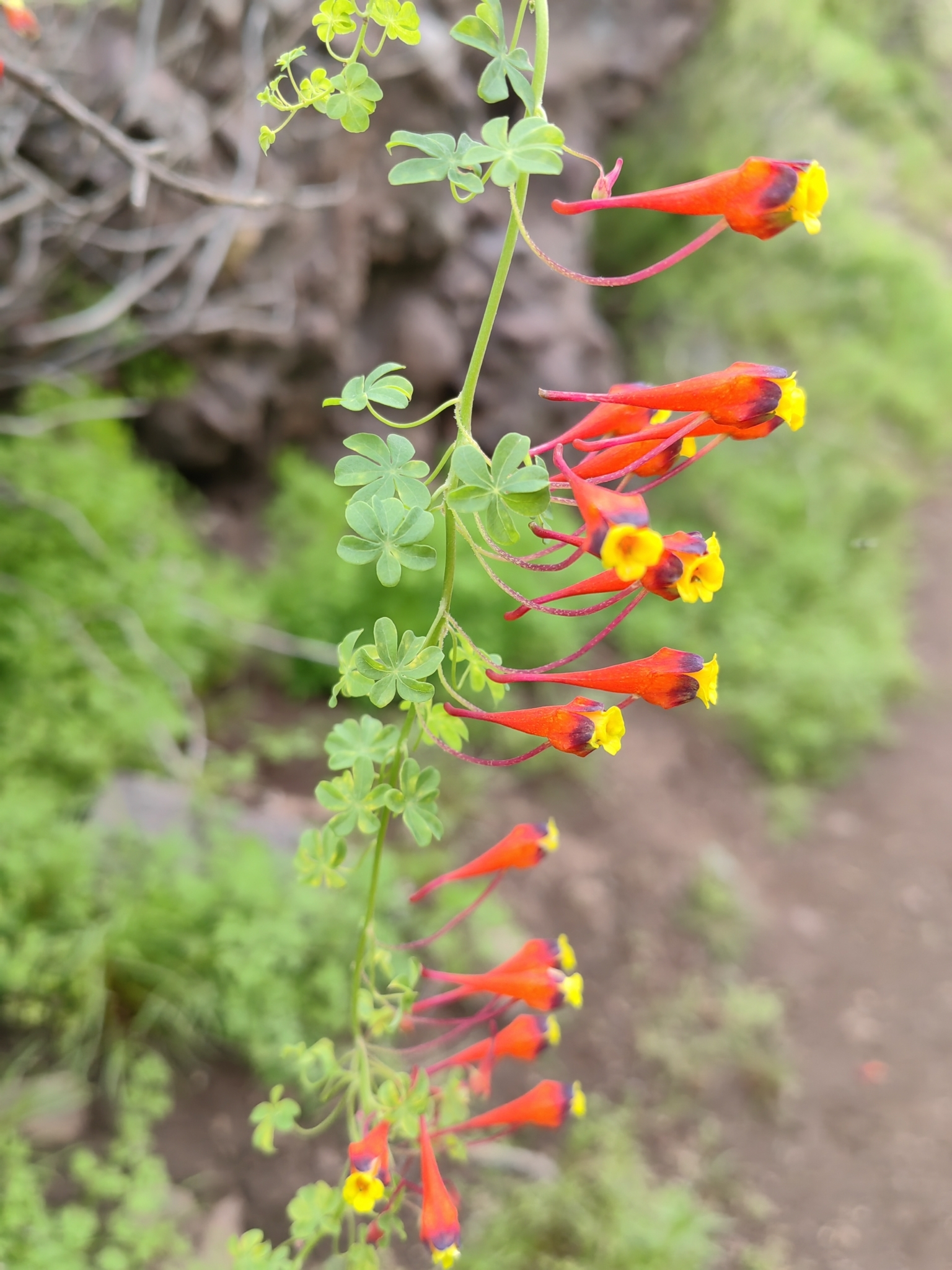

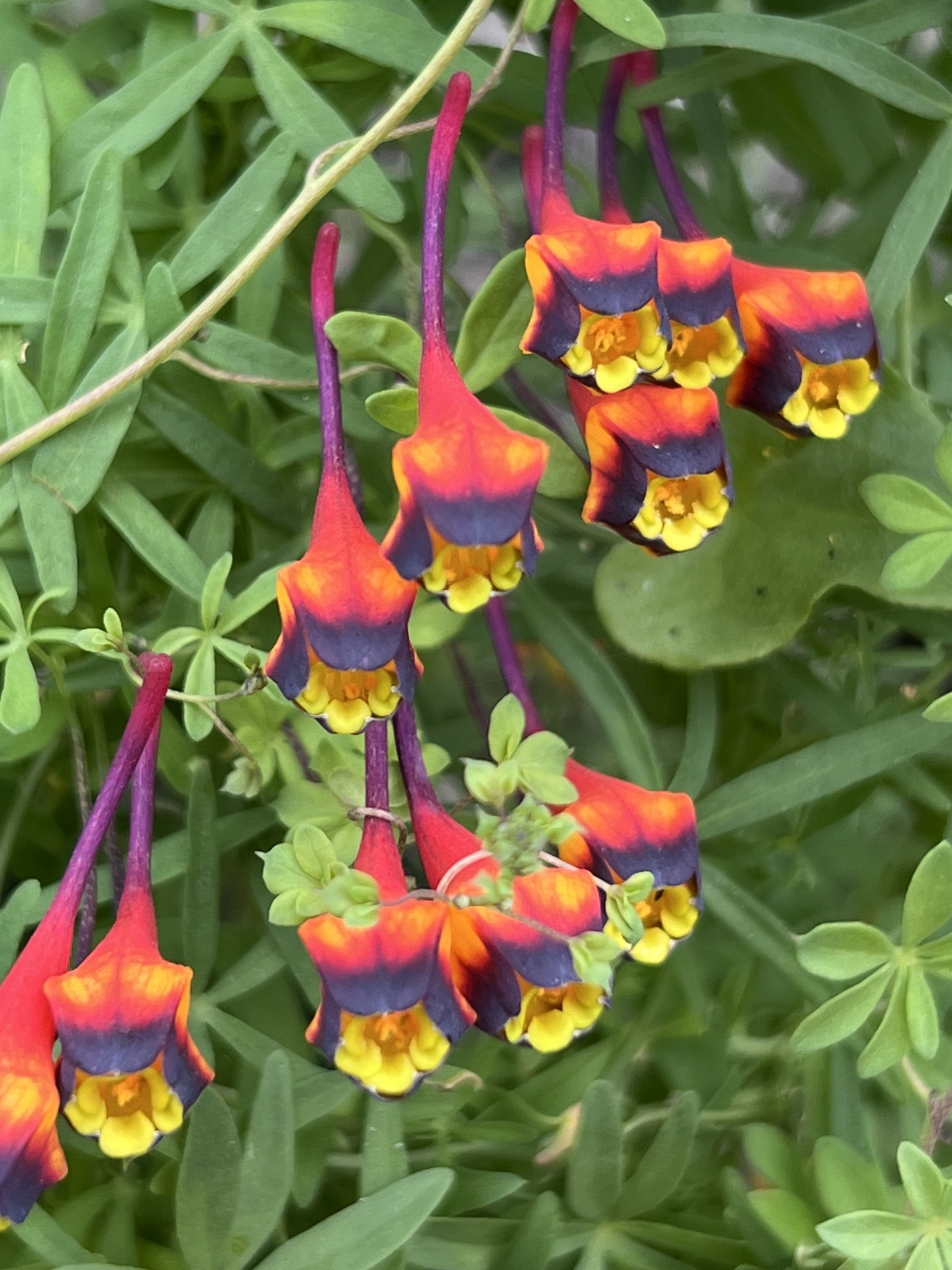
