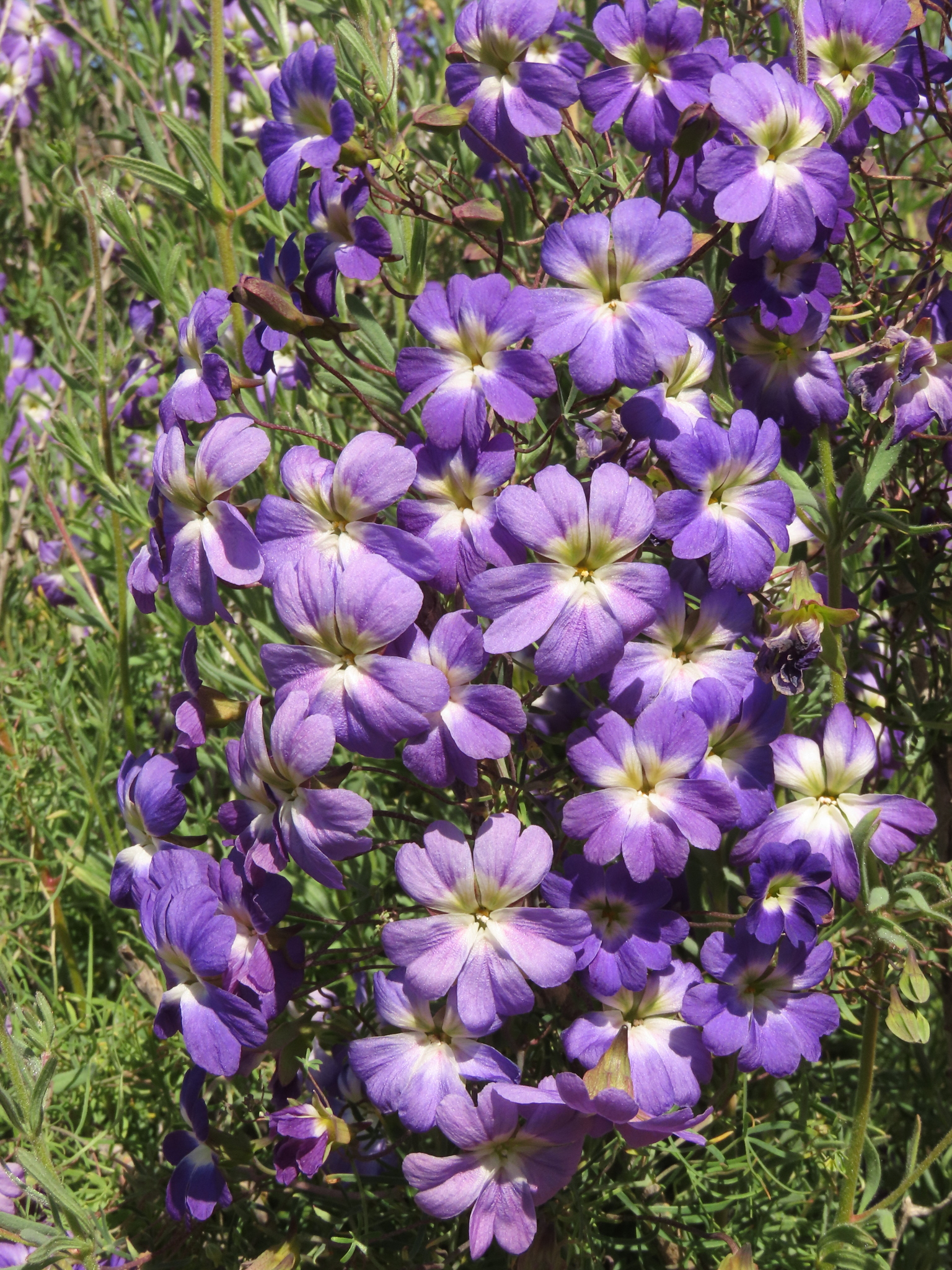

Scientific classification
- Kingdom: Plantae
- Clade: Embryophytes
- Clade: Tracheophytes
- Clade: Spermatophytes
- Clade: Angiosperms
- Clade: Eudicots
- Clade: Rosids
- Order: Brassicales
- Family: Tropaeolaceae
- Genus: Tropaeolum
- Species: T. azureum

Binomial name
- Tropaeolum azureum L.

= Tropaeolum azureum =

Species of flowering plant

Tropaeolum azureum is a species of perennial plant in the family Tropaeolaceae. It is endemic to mountainous regions of Chile. It is a small climber, around 1 m (3 ft 3 in) long.

== Gallery ==
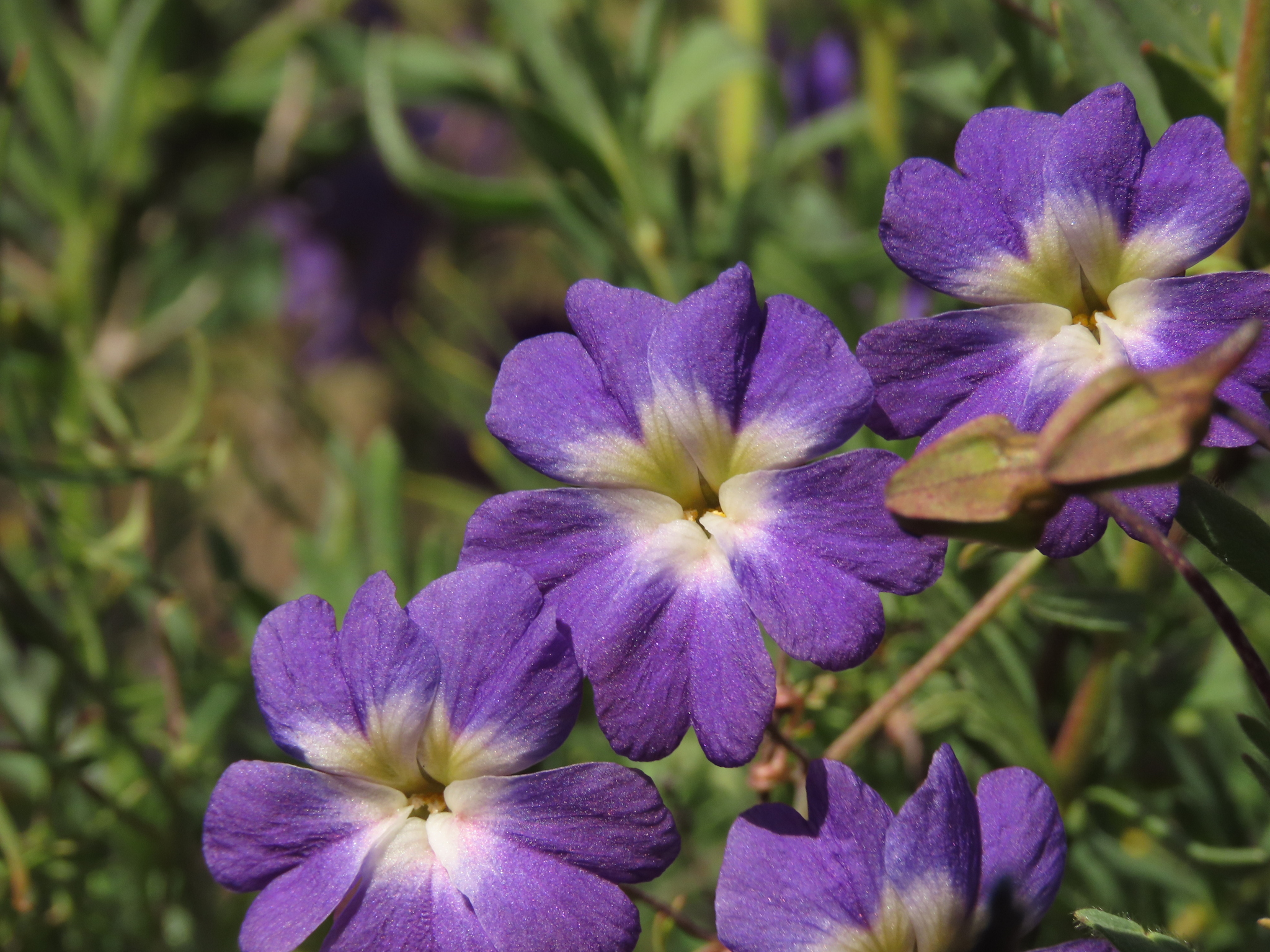

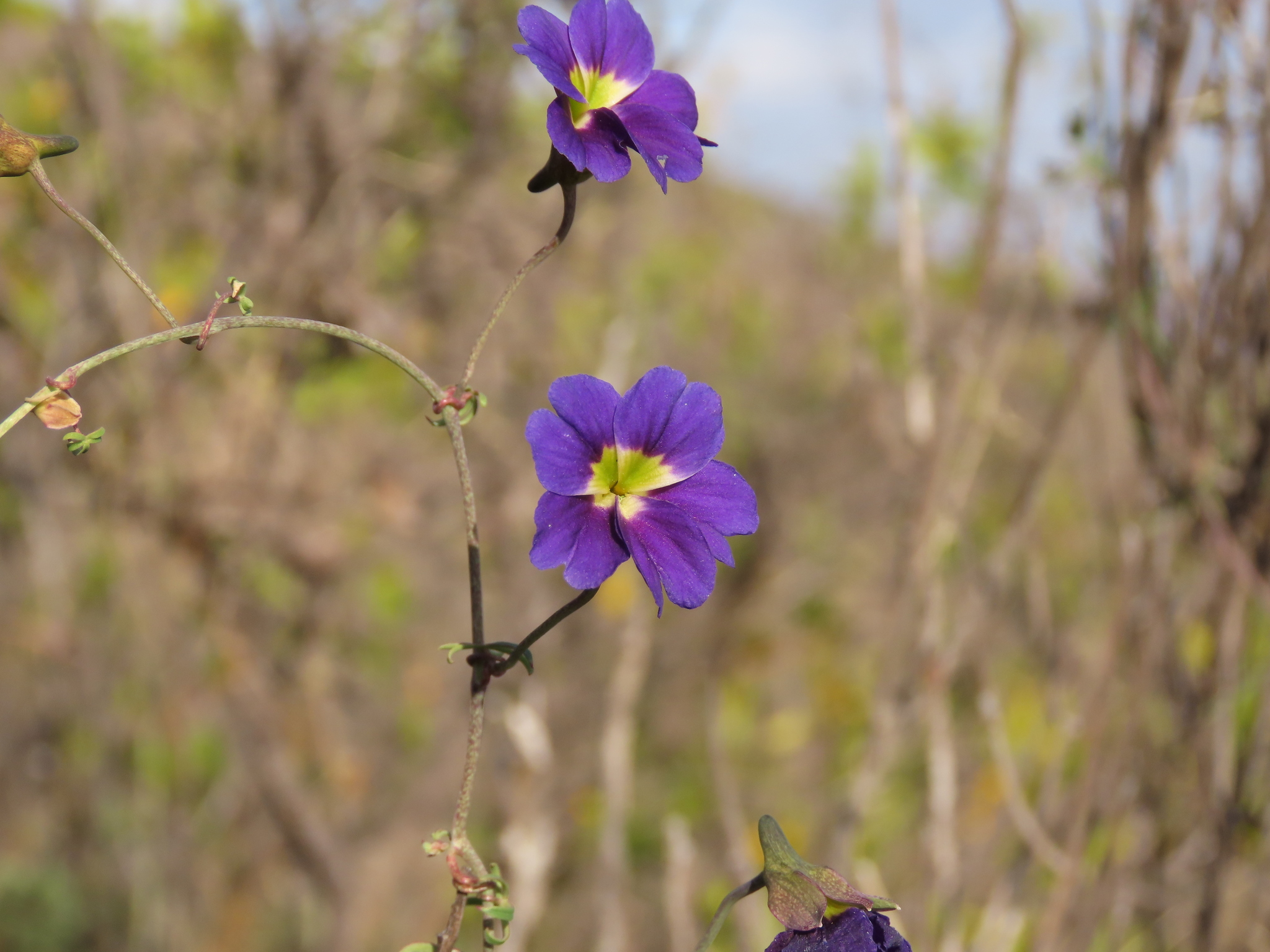

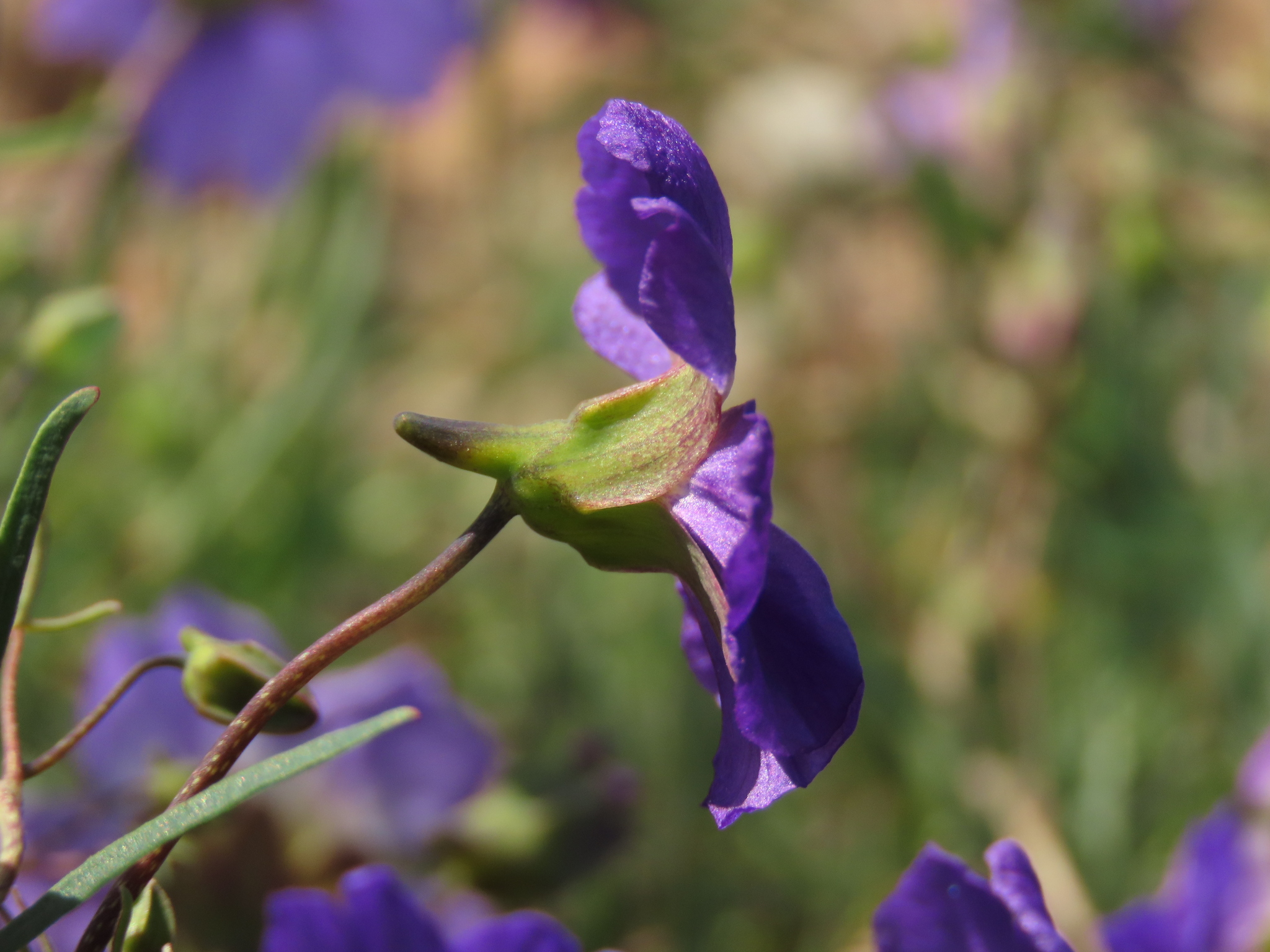
Showing nectar spur
