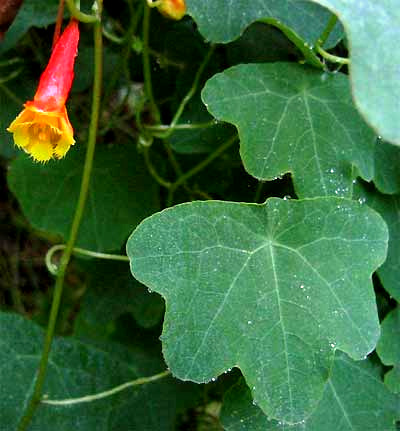

Scientific classification
- Kingdom: Plantae
- Clade: Tracheophytes
- Clade: Angiosperms
- Clade: Eudicots
- Clade: Rosids
- Order: Brassicales
- Family: Tropaeolaceae
- Genus: Tropaeolum
- Species: T. emarginatum

Binomial name
- Tropaeolum emarginatum Turcz.

Synonyms
- Trophaeum emarginatum (Turcz.) Kuntze

= Tropaeolum emarginatum =

Species of flowering plant

Tropaeolum emarginatum is a flowering plant belonging to the family Tropaeolaceae. That family occurs naturally only in the New World, and comprises only the single genus Tropaeolum, in which all the species commonly are known as nasturiums.

== Description ==
Tropaeolum emarginatum, like all species of Tropaeolum, displays these prominent features:

- It is an herbaceous, hairless annual with unbranched stems that often climb.
- Its leaves arise singly where they attach to their stems.
- Leaf blade margins are not toothed or cut, but can be wavy to deeply lobed.
- Petioles, often twining, attach to the leaf blade at a point within the blade's undersurface (peltate), not at the blade's base.
- Flowers on pedicels display bilateral symmetry.
- At least one of the flowers' lower sepals elongate into a slender Nectar spur.
- Fruits are schizocarps which break into one-seeded sections called mericarps.

Among the 80 or so known species of Tropaeolum, these features further distinguish Tropaeolum emarginatum:

- Stems are relatively long and may climb up to about 8 m (26 ft) high.
- Petioles reach up to 9 cm (3.5 in) long
- Leaves are rounded with wavy margins usually producing 5 shallow lobes.
- Blades have 5 or more principal nerves, of which the middle three are not forked but side nerves are.
- Sepals are reddish or sometimes somewhat greenish yellow, the spur normally being red but sometimes greenish-tipped.
- Spurs are straight or slightly curved, reaching up to 25 mm (1 in) long.
- Petals bear fringes of short, hair-like cilia at their apexes.
- Petals are yellow, the upper ones often with a purple spot, though the lower ones lack the spot.
- Upper petals are of the same size or bigger than the lower ones.

== Distribution ==
Tropaeolum emarginatum occurs from southernmost Mexico, the state of Chiapas, south into Colombia.

== Habitat ==
In Panama, Tropaeolum emarginatum has been collected in mountains between ~1800 and 2130m (6000-7000 feet). Also in Panama it has been documented inhabiting a light gap in a mixed forest in which oak, Podocarpus, magnolia and Symplocos were common.

In Mexico, it has been documented in a clearing in a mountain's cloud forest.

== Taxonomy ==
Within the genus Tropaeolum, traditionally Tropaeolum emarginatum has been assigned to the section Tropaeolum. A phylogenetic analysis of the year 2000 did not change that.

== Etymology ==
The genus name Tropaeolum is New Latin from the Latin tropaeum, meaning "trophy". This refers to the shied-shaped leaves and helmet-shaped flowers.

The species name emarginatum is from the Latin emargino, meaning "to deprive of its edge". This could derive from the idea that sinuses between the leaves' shallow lobes represent areas where leaf edges are deprived of a presence.
