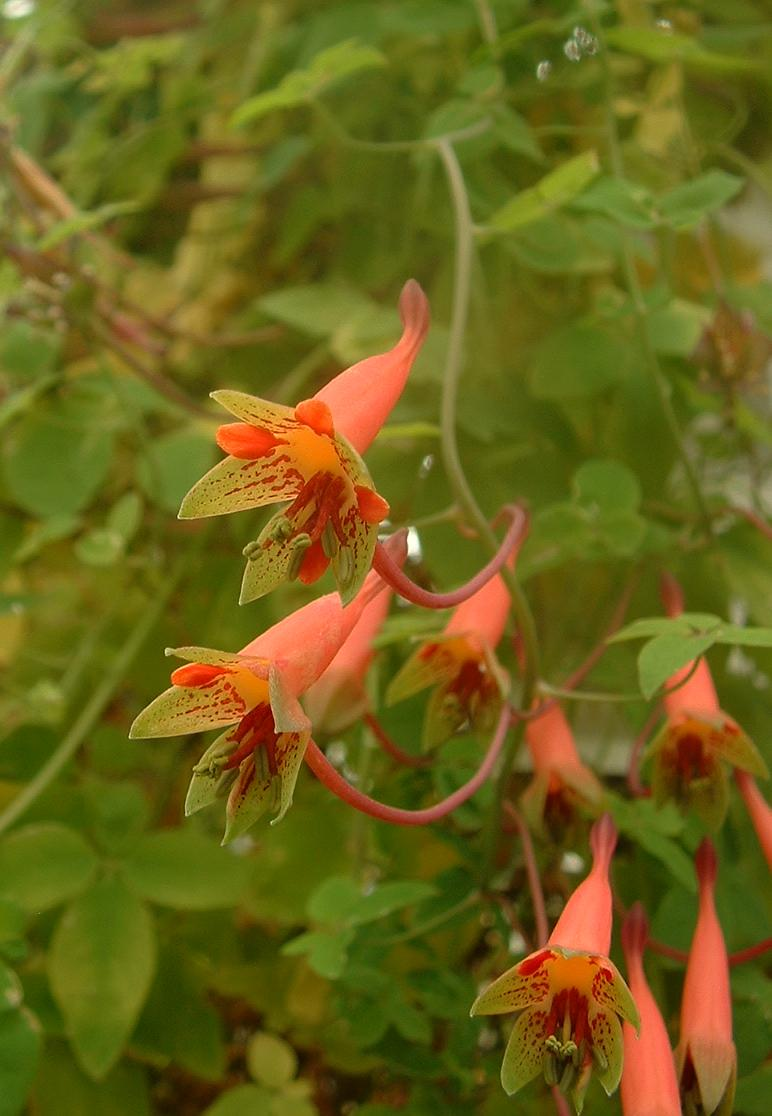

Scientific classification
- Kingdom: Plantae
- Clade: Tracheophytes
- Clade: Angiosperms
- Clade: Eudicots
- Clade: Rosids
- Order: Brassicales
- Family: Tropaeolaceae
- Genus: Tropaeolum
- Species: T. pentaphyllum

Binomial name
- Tropaeolum pentaphyllum Lam.

= Tropaeolum pentaphyllum =

Species of flowering plant

Tropaeolum pentaphyllum is a species of perennial plant in the nasturtium family Tropaeolaceae. It is found in Argentina, Brazil, Paraguay, and Uruguay.
