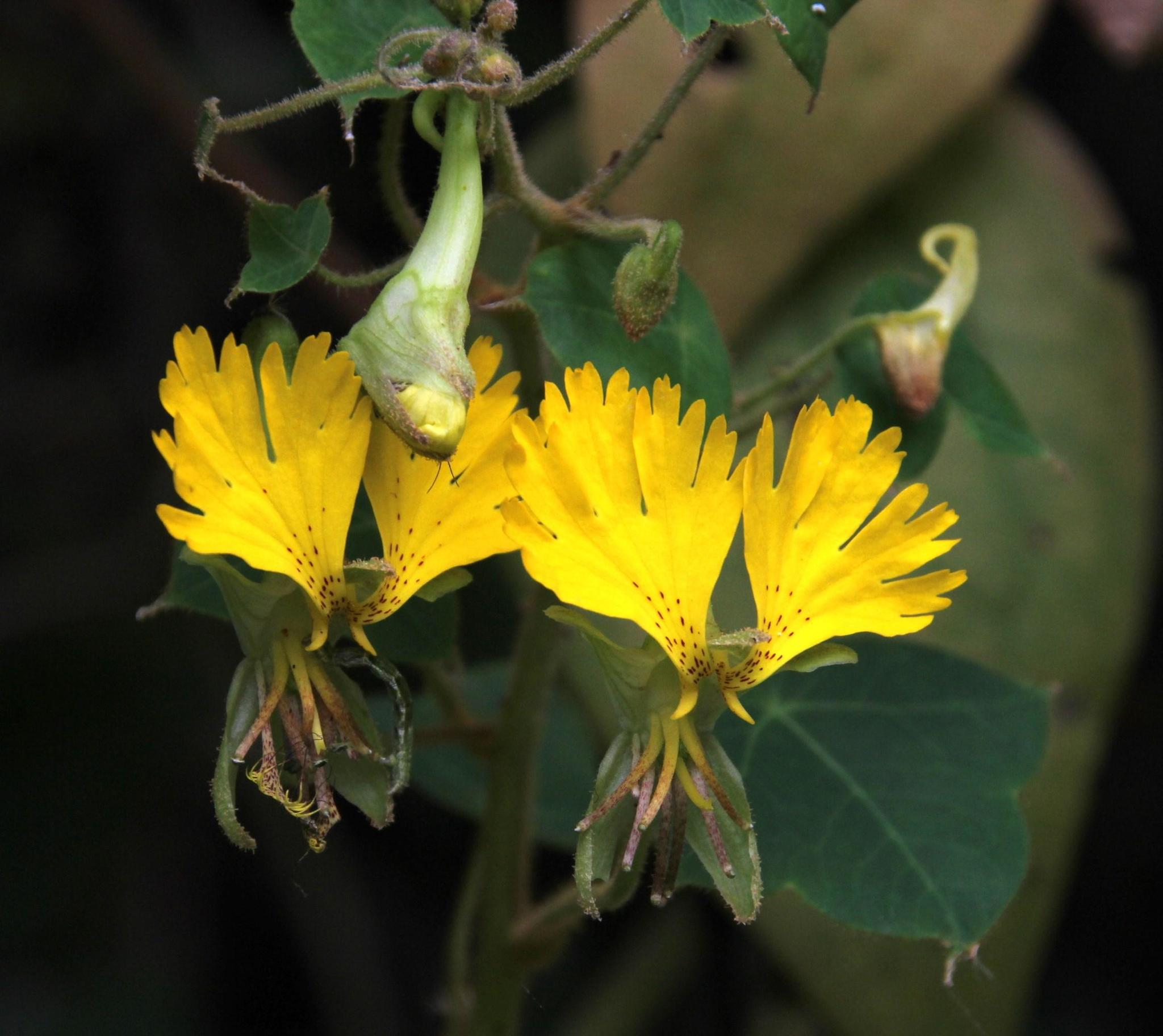

Scientific classification
- Kingdom: Plantae
- Clade: Tracheophytes
- Clade: Angiosperms
- Clade: Eudicots
- Clade: Rosids
- Order: Brassicales
- Family: Tropaeolaceae
- Genus: Tropaeolum
- Species: T. peregrinum

Binomial name
- Tropaeolum peregrinum L.

= Tropaeolum peregrinum =

Species of flowering plant

Tropaeolum peregrinum, the canary-creeper, canarybird flower, canarybird vine, or canary nasturtium, is a species of Tropaeolum native to western South America in Peru and possibly also Ecuador.

== Description ==
It is a climbing plant growing to 2.5 m (8 ft 2 in) high by scrambling over other vegetation. The leaves are 2–5 cm diameter, palmately lobed with three to seven (mostly five) lobes; they are subpeltate, with the petiole attached within the leaf (not at the edge), though near the edge.

The flowers are 2–4 cm diameter, with five frilled petals, bright pale yellow (canary-coloured, hence the English name), often with red spots at the base of the petals, eight stamens, and a 12 mm nectar spur at the rear.

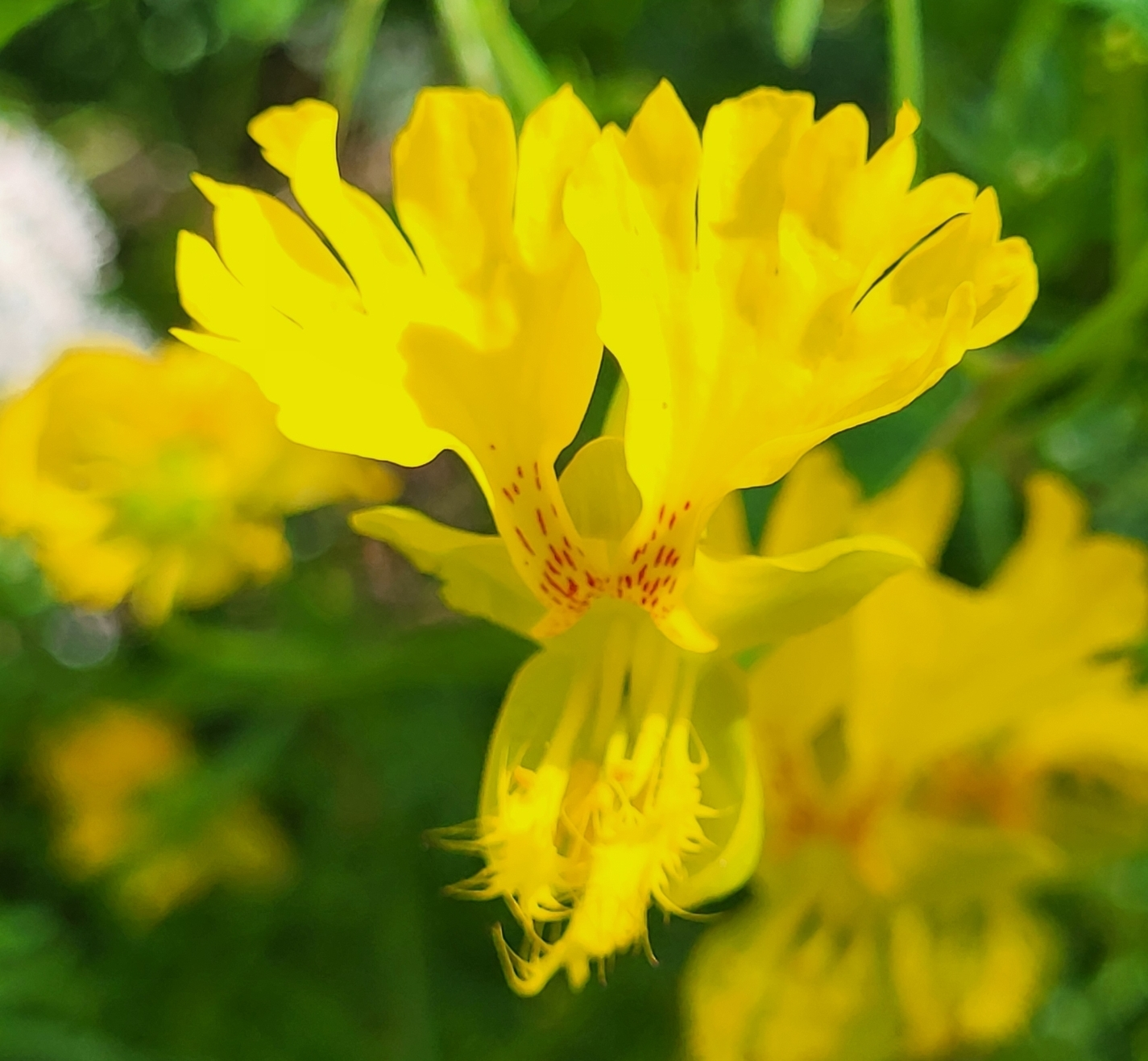
Flower

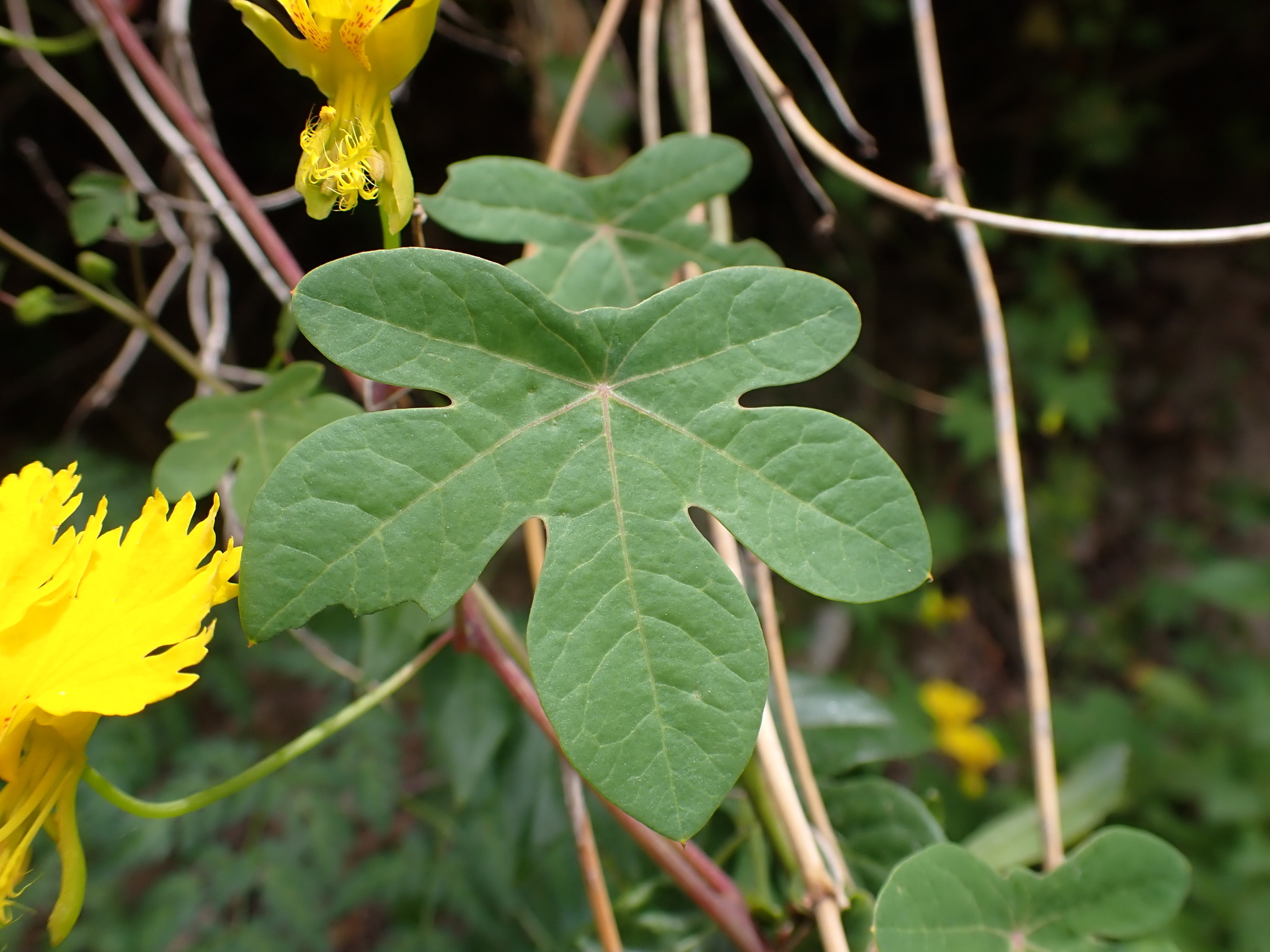
Leaf

== Cultivation ==
It is a frost-tender perennial widely grown as an annual ornamental plant in cool temperate parts of the world.

== Gallery ==
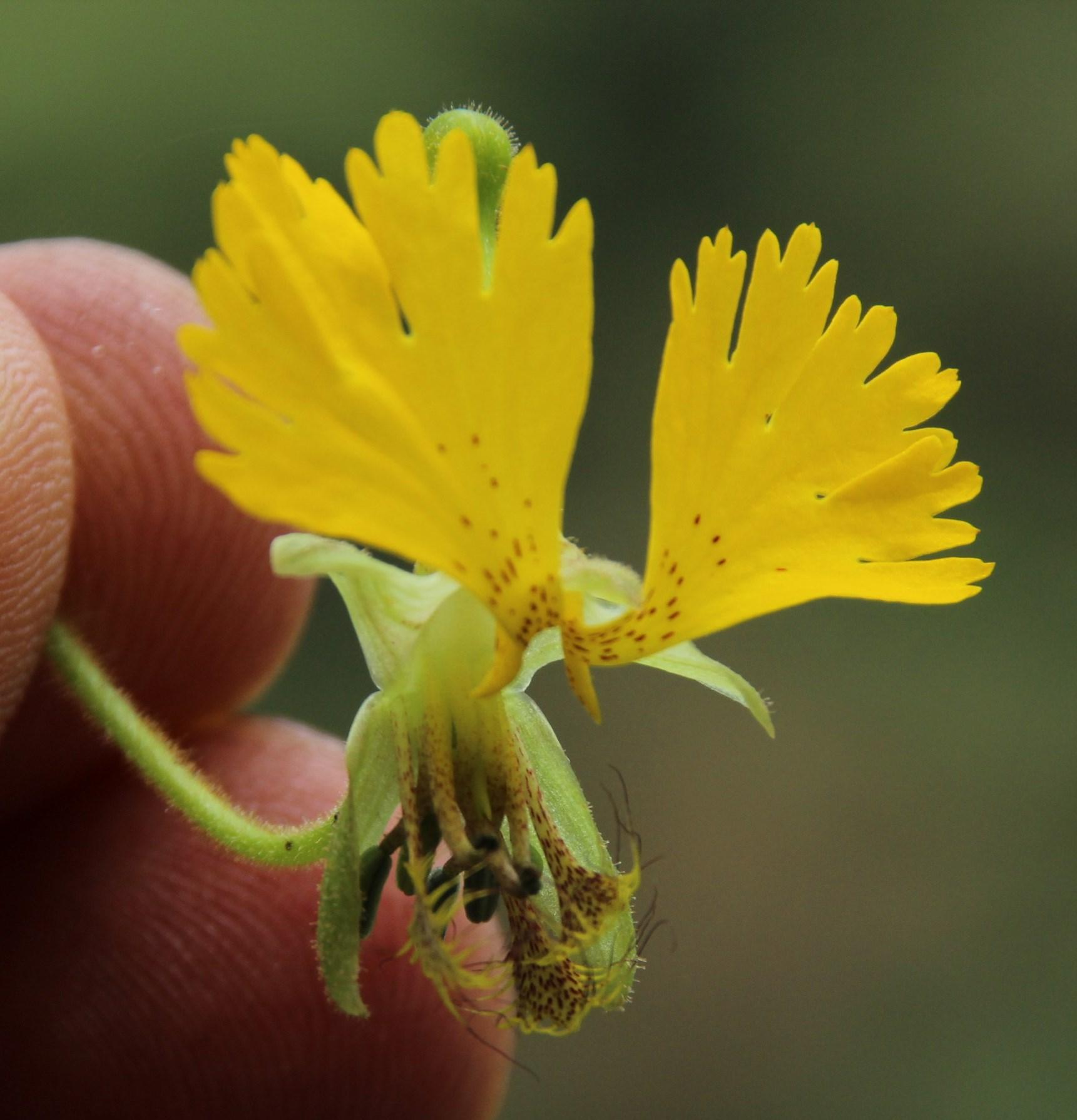

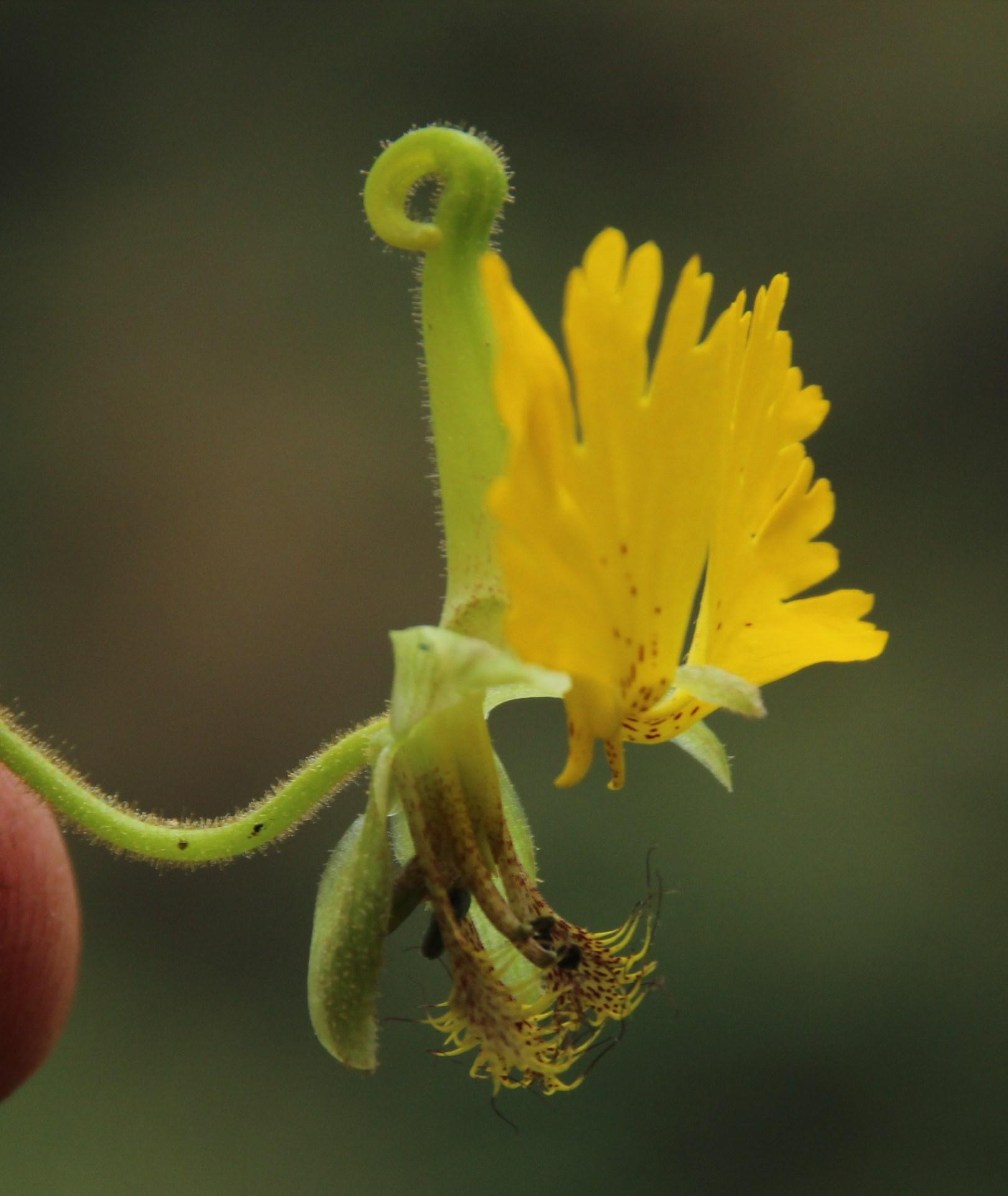

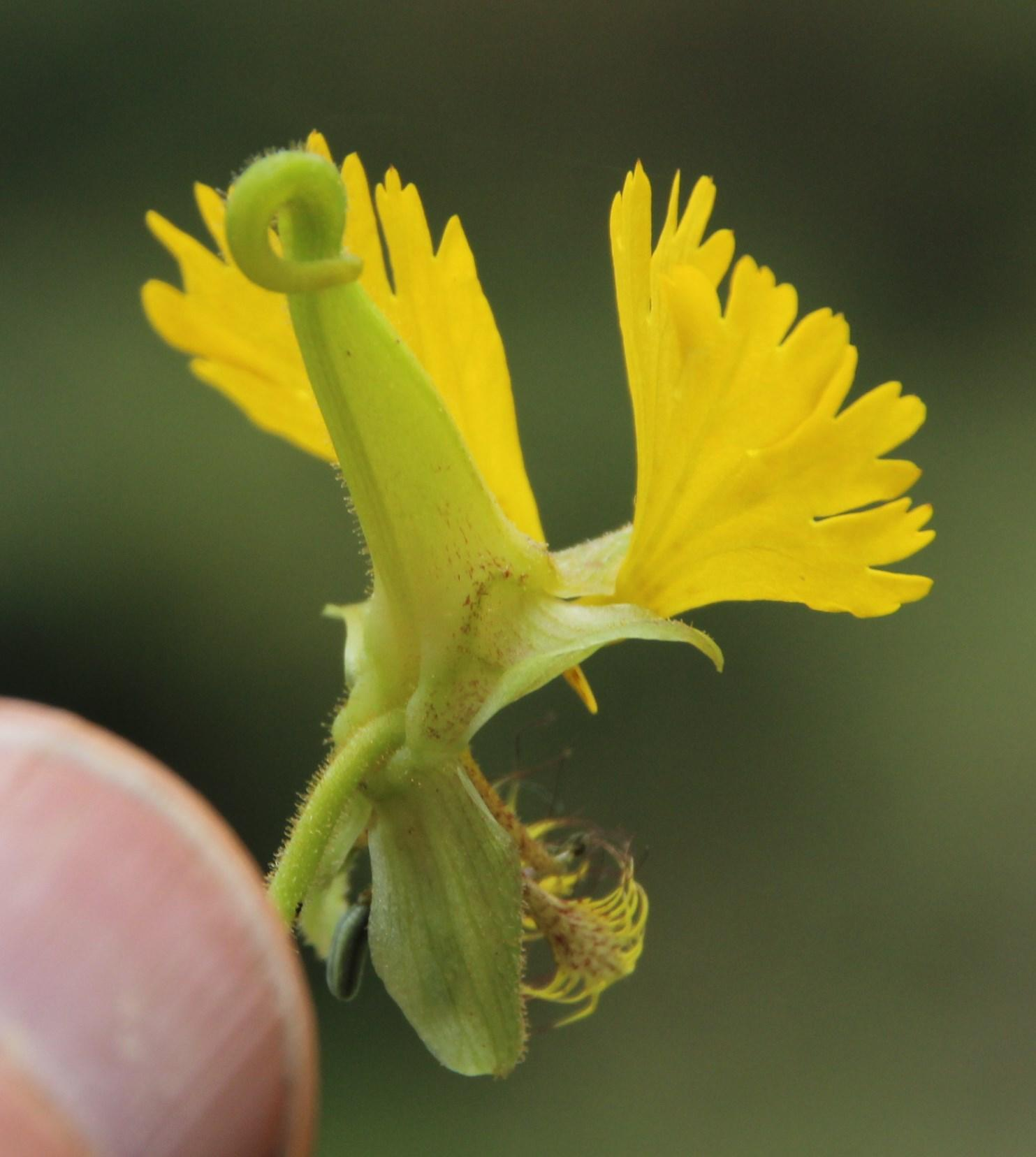

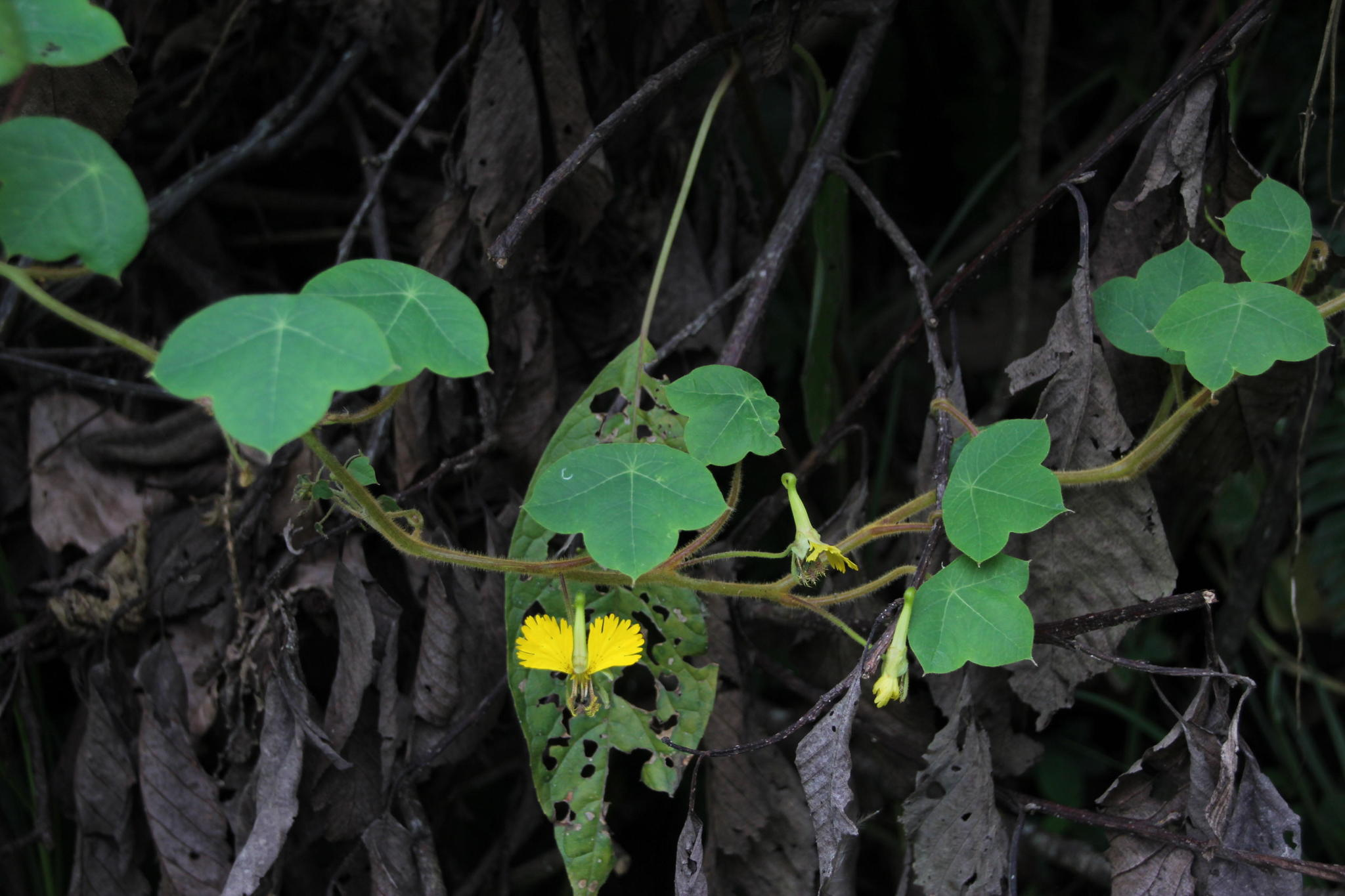
