= List of Keys to the City in Canada =

Honorary gift to esteemed individuals

The Key to the City is a symbol of the Freedom of the City presented by a town or city's municipal government to esteemed residents or visitors whom the city wishes to honour. The award, usually an ornamental key, is generally presented by the mayor or some other public figure at an award ceremony. Some cities allow visiting celebrities to request that a key be granted to them, a practice which has resulted in some controversy.

== Alberta ==
=== Calgary ===
The local equivalent is the White Hat ceremony, which was begun in the 1950s by Mayor Donald Hugh MacKay. The first white felt cowboy hat was given to the Mayor of Toronto, Hiram E. McCallum, as thanks for his hosting during the 36th Grey Cup (1948). The honour can be requested through Tourism Calgary; white hatting ceremonies are also conducted for individual tourists and groups by a volunteer corps at the Calgary International Airport. Past recipients include:

- 1969: Karol Wojtyła, Archbishop of Kraków (later elected Pope John Paul II)
- 1969: Prince Philip
- 1977: Prince Charles and Prince Andrew
- July 9, 2001: Ralph Goodale, Minister of Natural Resources from 1997 to 2002, and Ernesto Martens, Mexico's Secretary of Energy
- June 27, 2002: The eight world leaders attending the 28th G8 summit – Tony Blair, Jacques Chirac, Vladimir Putin, Gerhard Schröder, Silvio Berlusconi, Junichiro Koizumi, Jean Chrétien, and George W. Bush
- February 28, 2003: Phil McGraw, as "Dr. Phil"
- March 16, 2005: Dave Bautista and Chris Benoit, WWE wrestlers
- June 4, 2006: Prince Edward
- July 25, 2008: Ozzy Osbourne, rock performer, and Sharon Osbourne, music producer
- July 2009: David Petraeus, U.S. General
- September 30, 2009: Tenzin Gyatso, the 14th Dalai Lama
- October 13, 2009: David Jacobson, U.S. Ambassador to Canada
- December 4, 2009: Tommy Chong
- May 13, 2010: Princess Margriet of the Netherlands
- June 19, 2011: William Shatner, Canadian actor, musician, singer, author, film director, spokesman and comedian
- July 7, 2011: Prince William and Catherine, the Duke and Duchess of Cambridge
- November 3, 2012: Tommy Tallarico, creator of Video Games Live, Laura Intravia, singer-flutist, and Christopher Tin, composer
- September 24, 2015: Trooper, Canadian rock band

Other recipients include Kevin Costner, Robert Duvall, Luciano Pavarotti, and Oprah Winfrey.

=== Edmonton ===
- August 27, 1989: Wayne Gretzky, hockey player

=== Lethbridge ===
- August 4, 2015: Kris Versteeg, hockey player
- May 9, 2017: Tyler Wong, captain of the Lethbridge Hurricanes
- December 10, 2024: Sayeh Zielke, cardiologist

== British Columbia ==
Municipalities in British Columbia grant the freedom of the city, rather than a key, to individuals worthy of recognition. In accordance with Section 158 of the Community Charter, potential recipients must receive the unanimous support of the city council before they are granted the Freedom, which is then usually bestowed upon them during a special ceremony.

In the following list, where the date of the award ceremony is unknown, the date of the council resolution is given instead. These dates are marked with (res.).

=== Burnaby ===
- June 14, 1968: George Pearkes, 20th Lieutenant Governor of British Columbia
- April 14, 1978: Bob Prittie, mayor of Burnaby
- April 3, 1987: Eileen Dailly, deputy premier and Minister of Education
- April 6, 1990: James Gibson Lorimer, politician
- June 14, 2010: Michael J. Fox, actor

Source: City of Burnaby

=== City of North Vancouver ===
- March 21, 1966 (res.): George Pearkes, 20th Lieutenant Governor of British Columbia
- September 13, 1966 (res.): Jack Loutet, mayor of North Vancouver
- March 4, 1968 (res.): Nancy Greene, alpine skier
- January 18, 1971 (res.): John Henry Cates, Canadian MLA, and his wife, Carrie, a former mayor
- April 8, 2002 (res.): Ray Perrault, senator
- June 14, 2010: Lauren Woolstencroft, paralympic skier

=== Comox ===
- August 16, 2017: John Marinus, Comox town councillor

=== Coquitlam ===
- Fern Bouvier
- Sandy Burpee
- Don Cunnings
- Reverend John Davies
- Dorothy Fleming
- Larry Fleming
- Rene Gamache
- Dr. J. Crosby Johnston
- Jean Lambert
- Robert McNary
- Eunice Parker
- Leonore Peyton

Source: City of Coquitlam

=== District of North Vancouver ===
- March 3, 1973: Karen Magnussen, world figure skating champion
- June 9, 2008: Don Bell, mayor

=== Kelowna ===
- December 8, 1952: W. A. C. Bennett, 25th premier of British Columbia

=== Oliver ===
- September 15, 2017: Clarence Louie chief of the Osoyoos Indian Band

=== Vancouver ===
Unless otherwise specified, the source of the items on this list is the City of Vancouver's website.

- June 28, 1933: Jimmy McLarnin, police officer
- August 28, 1936: Edward Wentworth Beatty, president of the Canadian Pacific Railway
- April 11, 1938: Lauchlan Alexander Hamilton, civil engineer and Alderman
- January 4, 1939 (res.): R. B. Bennett, 11th prime minister of Canada
- June 30, 1941 (res.): William Lyon Mackenzie King, 10th prime minister of Canada
- September 29, 1941 (res.): Eric Hamber, 15th lieutenant governor of British Columbia
- January 2, 1946 (res.): Harry Crerar, military general
- December 23, 1946 (res.): William Culham Woodward, 16th lieutenant governor of British Columbia
- March 17, 1947 (res.): William Harold Malkin, 21st mayor of Vancouver
- November 3, 1949: Jawaharlal Nehru, prime minister of India
- December 1, 1952 (res.): George Clark Miller, 23rd mayor of Vancouver
- November 16, 1953 (res.): J. S. Matthews, archivist and historian
- December 17, 1963 (res.): Jonathan Webster Cornett, 25th mayor of Vancouver
- December 17, 1963 (res.): George T. Cunningham, founder of the pharmacy chain Cunningham's
- December 30, 1963 (res.): Frederick Hume, 28th mayor of Vancouver
- December 29, 1964 (res.): Charles Edwin Thompson, 27th mayor of Vancouver
- December 29, 1964 (res.): Henry Herbert Stevens, politician and businessman
- February 17, 1965 (res.): W. A. C. Bennett, premier of British Columbia
- December 29, 1965 (res.): Arnold Webster, politician
- December 20, 1966 (res.): H. R. MacMillan, chair of the Vancouver Board of Trade
- January 16, 1968 (res.): Frank Mackenzie Ross, 19th lieutenant governor of British Columbia
- August 27, 1968 (res.): George Pearkes, 20th lieutenant governor of British Columbia
- October 1, 1968 (res.): William Mark Duke, Archbishop of Vancouver
- December 17, 1968 (res.): Clarence Wallace, 18th lieutenant governor of British Columbia
- December 16, 1970 (res.): Prentice Bloedel, creator of the Bloedel Reserve
- January 11, 1972 (res.): Howard Charles Green, politician
- January 11, 1972 (res.): Whitford Julian VanDusen, businessman and philanthropist
- April 10, 1973 (res.): Harold Edward Winch, politician and Leader of the Opposition
- July 23, 1974 (res.): Grace MacInnis, politician
- August 27, 1974 (res.): Arthur Laing, leader of the British Columbia Liberal Party
- December 17, 1976 (res.): John Robert Nicholson, 21st lieutenant governor of British Columbia
- March 14, 1978 (res.): Jean Coulthard, composer
- April 24, 1979 (res.): Jack Diamond, businessman and philanthropist
- June 11, 1985 (res.): John Lecky, Olympic rower
- January 7, 1986 (res.): Henry Pybus Bell-Irving, 23rd lieutenant governor of British Columbia
- January 7, 1986 (res.): Walter Koerner, businessman and philanthropist
- March 24, 1987 (res.): Rick Hansen, paralympian
- April 29, 1988: Cecil Howard Green, geophysicist and Texas Instruments founder
- July 12, 1988 (res.): Nathaniel Nemetz, lawyer and judge
- February 4, 1989: Jack Shadbolt, artist
- June 16, 1992 (res.): Thomas R. Berger, politician and jurist
- September 2, 1993 (res.): The Vancouver Foundation
- September 28, 1993 (res.): David Lam, 25th lieutenant governor of British Columbia
- April 12, 1994: George Woodcock, author and critic
- May 28, 2002 (res.): Arthur Erickson, architect
- November 5, 2002 (res.): Kim Campbell, 19th prime minister of Canada
- October 6, 2005 (res.): Dal Richards, musician
- July 6, 2010: Art Phillips, 32nd mayor of Vancouver
- February 23, 2011: Jim Green, councillor
- July 12, 2011: Milton Wong, businessman and philanthropist
- October 30, 2015: Dr. David Suzuki, academic, science broadcaster, and environmental activist
- November 8, 2016: Margaret Mitchell, member of parliament for Vancouver East
- February 28, 2017: Michael Harcourt, mayor of Vancouver and premier of British Columbia

=== Victoria ===
- March 9, 1927: Freeman Freeman-Thomas, 13th governor general of Canada
- June 19, 1928: Robert Pim Butchart, founder of Butchart Gardens
- February 5, 1959: Frank Mackenzie Ross, 19th lieutenant Governor of British Columbia
- November 19, 1965: George Pearkes, 20th lieutenant governor of British Columbia
- October 13, 1966: Robert Mayhew, businessman and politician
- October 15, 1970: W. A. C. Bennett, premier of British Columbia

=== West Vancouver ===
- May 31, 1990 (res.): Pierre Savard, mayor of Verdun
- September 8, 2003 (res.): Allan Williams, attorney general of British Columbia
- October 5, 2009: Gordon A. Smith, artist

== Manitoba ==
=== Thompson ===
- 2025: Alice Lavoie, business owner

=== Winnipeg ===
- Foster Hewitt, radio broadcaster for Hockey Night in Canada
- 2002: Shannen Doherty, actress
- 2002: Shirley MacLaine, actress
- 2004: Chris Jericho, professional wrestler and singer
- August 24, 2007: Milt Stegall, football player for the Winnipeg Blue Bombers
- December 3, 2008: Bob Geldof, musician-activist
- March 14, 2010: Jon Montgomery, Olympian
- March 28, 2010: Henry Winkler, actor
- July 11, 2010: Jonathan Toews, hockey player
- June 15, 2011: Gene Simmons, musician
- September 12, 2011: Steve Nash, basketball player
- October 19, 2012: Twyla Tharp, choreographer
- August 12, 2013: Paul McCartney, musician
- October 21, 2016: Teemu Selanne, NHL Player
- July 12, 2025: Bruce Cockburn, musician

== New Brunswick ==
=== Saint John ===
- May 18, 1933: R. B. Bennett, 11th prime minister of Canada

== Newfoundland and Labrador ==
=== St. John's ===
St. John's awards the Freedom of the City rather than a Key.

- May 22, 1968: Bernard Montgomery, 1st Viscount Montgomery of Alamein
- October 10, 1970: Irish Ambassador Joseph Shields, Alderman D.C. MacLean, Provost of Ayr, Scotland, Alan O. Will of Bristol, England, Henry G.R. Mews
- August 31, 1977: Andrew Crosbie
- September 11, 1997: Paul Johnson
- May 28, 2000: Drum Major William Tilley, Major Walter Learning, Colonel Adrian Heffernan
- May 12, 2001: World Junior Championship Curling Team (Brad Gushue, Mark Nichols, Brent Hamilton, Mike Adam, Jamie Korab, Jeff Thomas)
- November 15, 2004: Dr. Paul O'Neill
- September 30, 2008: Dr. Nigel Rusted
- June 24, 2010: John J. Murphy
- May 19, 2016: Elinor Gill Ratcliffe, philanthropist
- March 12, 2018: Shannie Duff, 12th mayor of St. John's
- November 22, 2021: Rotary Clubs of St. John's

Source: City of St. John's

== Ontario ==
=== Brampton ===
- January 18, 1999: Michael Collins
- July 31, 2011: Tyler Seguin, hockey player, following his Stanley Cup win
- September 11, 2011: Akshay Kumar
- September 11, 2011: Russell Peters
- June 17, 2013: George "Potsy" Burrows, war veteran and Ontario Lacrosse Hall of Fame inductee
- July 1, 2013: Anthony Bennett, basketball player, after being drafted first overall in the 2013 NBA draft
- August 26, 2016: Tristan Thompson, basketball player
- December 20, 2017: Jonathan Osorio, soccer player
- November 25, 2019: William G. Davis, premier of Ontario
- December 20, 2021: Henry Verschuren
- June 6, 2022: Ogiame Atuwatse III
- April 18, 2023: Gurbax Malhi, member of Parliament
- February 27, 2024: Marc Andrews, deputy chief of police
- December 2025: Annie Bynoe, founder of local food bank

Source: City of Brampton

=== Burlington ===
- January 2019: Mike 'Beard Guy' Taylor
- October 2019: City of Itabashi, Japan
- January 2020: Gordon Schottlander
- December 2020: Kendall Cooper
- December 2020: Ian Elliott
- October 2021: Jean Longfield
- October 2021: Lisa Lunski
- March 2022: Renata Fast
- March 2022: Emma Maltais
- July 2022: Burlington Teen Tour Band
- May 2023: City of Apeldoorn, The Netherlands
- July 2023: Beverly Kingdon
- June 2024: Spoons
- June 2024: Dan Lawrie
- April 16, 2025: Sarah Harmer, musician
- April 16, 2025: Beverley Jacobs, community activist
- April 16, 2025: Chris McKhool, musician and filmmaker
- November 21, 2025: Victoria Mboko, tennis player
- April 15, 2026: Frank Hayden, founder of Special Olympics Burlington
- April 15, 2026: Dennis and Lisa Scott, anti-racism activists
- April 15, 2026: Ron MacVinnie, volunteer
- April 15, 2026: Elsie Naccarato, singer and conductor

Source: City of Burlington

=== Hamilton ===
- September 1998: Stone Cold Steve Austin
- August 7, 2025: Shai Gilgeous-Alexander, basketball player

=== Kingston ===
- August 29, 1991: The Tragically Hip
- June 18, 2013: Vicki Keith, marathon swimmer
- February 4, 2014: 424 Squadron SAR crew
- December 7, 2016: Arthur B. McDonald, physicist

=== London ===
- August 27, 2022: Nazem Kadri, 2022 Stanley Cup champion

=== Markham ===
- June 27, 2010: Leonard Birchall and 351 Silverstar Air Cadet Squadron

=== Mississauga ===
- April 12, 2017: Hazel McCallion, mayor of Mississauga
- September 15, 2019: Bianca Andreescu, tennis player, after her 2019 US Open – Women's Singles Championship
- November 14, 2019: Mohamad Fakih, businessperson
- November 2019: Rik Emmett, Mike Levine, and Gil Moore of Triumph
- March 3, 2022: Lawrence Loh, medical officer of health for the Region of Peel during the COVID-19 pandemic
- December 13, 2023: Nav Bhatia, Toronto Raptors superfan
- November 5, 2025: Daniel Nedelko, business owner

Other recipients include Yoshinori Takenaka and Walter Kawiecki.

=== Niagara Falls ===
- February 25, 2022: Erika Casupanan, winner of Survivor 41
- May 16, 2022: Howie Mandel, actor and comedian
- October 9, 2024: Wayne Thomson

=== Ottawa ===
- December 20, 1902: Mary Caroline Grey (Lady Minto)
- January 28, 1922: Julian Byng and Evelyn Byng (Lord and Lady Byng)
- April 25, 1935: Frank Boucher, hockey player
- April 25, 1935: Alec Connell, hockey player
- April 25, 1935: Stewart Evans, hockey player
- April 25, 1935: Tommy Gorman, hockey player
- April 25, 1935: Frank Nighbor, hockey player
- April 25, 1935: Basil O'Meara, sports journalist for the Montreal Star
- April 25, 1935: Allan Shields, hockey player
- September 25, 1935: Roberte Ponsonby, Countess of Bessborough
- November 4, 1935: John Buchan and Susan Buchan (Lord and Lady Tweedsmuir)
- March 10, 1937: Cecilia Colledge, British figure skater
- June 19, 1937: South African lawn bowling team
- January 23, 1938: Archibald Jacob Freiman, businessman, and Lillian Freiman, philanthropist
- April 15, 1939: Megan Taylor, British figure skater
- May 6, 1940: Walter D. Head, international president of Rotary
- December 1941: Winston Churchill
- August 28, 1946: Bernard Montgomery, British army officer
- March 9, 1948: Barbara Ann Scott, after winning the figure skating gold medal at the 1948 Summer Olympics
- December 21, 1948: J. E. Stanley Lewis, mayor of Ottawa
- September 8, 1951: Denys Lowson, Lord Mayor of London
- October 12, 1951: Princess Elizabeth, Duchess of Edinburgh, four months before her accession to the throne
- February 9, 1952: Harold Alexander, the Governor General of Canada, upon leaving office
- November 16, 1954: Queen Elizabeth The Queen Mother, former royal consort and mother to Queen Elizabeth II
- September 12, 1955: Hubert Guerin, French ambassador to Canada
- October 5, 1955: Prime Minister Louis St. Laurent and eight provincial premiers – Leslie Frost (Ontario), Maurice Duplessis (Quebec), W. A. C. Bennett (British Columbia), Hugh John Flemming (New Brunswick), Douglas Lloyd Campbell (Manitoba), Henry Hicks (Nova Scotia), Alexander Wallace Matheson (Prince Edward Island), and Ernest Manning (Alberta) – during a First Ministers' conference
- October 11, 1955: Mary, Princess Royal and Countess of Harewood
- June 27, 1956: Archibald Nye, high commissioner for the United Kingdom
- December 12, 1956: George A. Drew, leader of the Progressive Conservative Party, upon his retirement
- March 10, 1960: Anne Heggtveit, Olympic skier
- April 7, 1961: Harold Macmillan, British prime minister
- April 3, 1962: Francis Lacoste, French ambassador to Canada
- October 10, 1963: Derick Heathcoat-Amory, 1st Viscount Amory, high commissioner for the United Kingdom
- May 23, 1967: Roland Michener, governor general, and Norah Michener, chatelaine of Rideau Hall
- February 27, 1968: Nancy Greene, Olympic skier
- October 17, 1968: Pierre Trudeau, prime minister
- November 22, 1969: Russ Jackson, football player
- August 25, 1972: Paul Anka, singer, songwriter, and actor
- October 24, 1973: Bill Westwick, sportswriter for the Ottawa Journal, at a testimonial dinner held in the Château Laurier
- November 6, 1973: National Arts Centre Orchestra
- August 1974: Rich Little, impressionist
- October 20, 1974: Moe Racine, offensive lineman for the Ottawa Rough Riders
- October 9, 1976: HMCS Carleton
- November 4, 1977: F. R. Crawley, filmmaker
- August 26, 1980: Ken Taylor, ambassador to Iran during the Iran hostage crisis
- October 15, 1983: Lorne Greene
- March 14, 1984: Gaétan Boucher, speed skating Olympic champion
- September 5, 1984: Sue Holloway, Olympic cross-country skier and canoeist
- September 5, 1984: Linda Thom, Olympic shooter
- November 11, 1984: William Hutt, actor
- December 10, 1984: Marc Garneau, the first Canadian in space
- August 28, 1986: Richard Beecroft, multiple sclerosis research activist
- October 27, 1986: Rick Hansen, paralympian
- March 2, 1988: Elizabeth Manley, figure skater
- January 13, 1989: Brian Kilrea, general manager of the Ottawa 67's
- May 4, 1989: Frank Clair, general manager of the Ottawa Rough Riders
- November 6, 1989: Corazon Aquino, president of the Philippines
- October 24, 1990: Brian Law and the National Arts Centre Orchestra
- May 10, 1991: Military and Hospitaller Order of St. Lazarus of Jerusalem Grand Priory of Canada
- June 21, 1991: Ken Summers, naval officer
- October 13, 1994: Dan Aykroyd, comedian and actor
- March 8, 1996: Alanis Morissette, musician
- July 7, 1997: Angela Hewitt, classical pianist
- August 22, 1997: Bruce Cockburn, musician
- February 12, 1998: Bryan Adams, musician
- February 20, 1998: Peter Jennings, news anchor
- September 25, 1998: The University of Ottawa, 150-year anniversary
- February 19, 1999: Peter Mansbridge, news anchor
- November 12, 1999: Dave Smith, businessman and philanthropist
- May 17, 2000: Yousuf Karsh and Malak Karsh, photographers
- August 2, 2000: Jim Watson, mayor of Ottawa
- September 20, 2000: Margaret Atwood, author
- December 6, 2000: Max Keeping, broadcaster
- April 11, 2001: Ben Franklin, mayor of Nepean
- November 14, 2001: Bradley Family of Navan
- May 9, 2002: Princess Margriet of the Netherlands
- December 18, 2002: Willard and Wyatt McWilliams, founders of Hay West
- June 25, 2003: Mike Nemesvary, professional skier and quadriplegic activist
- May 19, 2004: Jean Pigott, member of Parliament
- February 23, 2005: Shukri D'Jama, Sahra Habbene, Saadia Nuh, and Shoon Omar
- March 9, 2005: Roland Armitage, mayor of West Carleton Township
- June 6, 2005: Aga Khan IV, Imam (spiritual leader) of the Ismaili Muslims and founder of the Aga Khan Development Network
- October 11, 2005: Gisèle Lalonde, mayor of Vanier, Ontario
- March 23, 2006: Dashan (Mark Rowswell), comedian and television personality
- May 16, 2006: Dominic D'Arcy, the "Singing Policeman"
- June 21, 2006: William Commanda, Algonquin spiritual leader
- May 29, 2007: The Commanding Officer of HMCS Ottawa
- November 26, 2008: Pierre Pagé, Ottawa city clerk
- February 18, 2010: Reuven Bulka, writer and rabbi
- January 23, 2012: David Currie, conductor for the Ottawa Symphony Orchestra
- November 19, 2012: Community Foundation of Ottawa
- July 8, 2013: Sandra Oh, actor
- March 3, 2015: Daniel Alfredsson, Ottawa Senators captain
- March 22, 2016: Beverley McLachlin, chief justice of Canada
- May 5, 2016: Alex Trebek, game show host and television personality
- March 20, 2017: Michel Picard, news anchor
- May 11, 2017: Algonquin College, 50-year anniversary
- June 18, 2017: Carleton University, 75-year anniversary
- June 19, 2017: Sheila Fraser, Auditor General of Canada
- September 7, 2017: Henry Burris, Ottawa Redblacks quarterback
- December 4, 2017: Murray Sinclair, senator
- April 18, 2018: David Johnston, governor general of Canada, and Sharon Johnston, author and viceregal consort of Canada
- April 28, 2018: Moe Atallah, founder of Newport Restaurant
- May 17, 2018: Peter Herrndorf, president of the National Arts Centre
- June 14, 2018: Hélène Campbell, organ donation activist
- November 1, 2018: Paul Dewar, member of Parliament
- April 29, 2019: Patrick Chan, Olympic figure skater
- May 1, 2019: Maureen McTeer, author and lawyer
- May 15, 2019: Dalton McGuinty, premier of Ontario
- June 18, 2019: Ronald Caza, lawyer
- September 12, 2019: Sue Garvey, executive director of Cornerstone Housing for Women
- March 8, 2022: Michaëlle Jean, governor general of Canada
- June 9, 2022: Vera Etches, Ottawa's medical officer of health, and Ottawa Public Health
- June 16, 2022: Ottawa Citizen, 175-year anniversary
- June 28, 2022: Brooke Henderson, professional golfer
- September 15, 2022: James Duthie, sportscaster
- June 21, 2024: Team Homan, World champion curling team (Rachel Homan, Tracy Fleury, Emma Miskew, Sarah Wilkes)
- July 24, 2025: Gabriela Dabrowski, tennis player
- April 7, 2026: Terry Matthews, business magnate

Source: City of Ottawa

=== Pembroke ===
- October 13, 2024: Jolan Wong, paralympian
- June 26, 2024: Jason Blaine, musician

=== Peterborough ===
- June 30, 2014: Corey Perry, Canadian hockey player
- December 8, 2017: Fleming College, 50-year anniversary
- December 8, 2017: Trent University
- February 1, 2019: Ada Lee, singer

Other recipients include Stompin' Tom Connors, Ronnie Hawkins, Bonnie Patterson, Thomas H. B. Symons, Paul Scholfield, and Dick Todd.

=== Sault Ste. Marie ===
- June 30, 2017: Roberta Bondar, astronaut
- July 19, 2023: Michael Amadio, 2023 Stanley Cup champion
- November 4, 2023: Joe Thornton, hockey player
- April 24, 2025: Sault College women's hockey team

=== Timmins ===
- August 16, 1947: Barbara Ann Scott, figure skater
- August 15, 1996: Shania Twain, singer

=== Toronto ===
- June 7, 1998: Mickey Rooney
- July 4, 1998: Bobby Curtola
- July 8, 1998: Sheldon Kennedy
- July 19, 1998: Bobby Rahal
- July 26, 1998: Ed Mirvish
- August 27, 1998: Charles Adler
- August 30, 1998: Roberto Leal
- September 27, 1998: Nelson Mandela
- November 27, 1998: Barbara Ann Scott-King
- December 4, 1998: Johnny Lombardi
- January 15, 1999: Yo-Yo Ma
- February 11, 1999: David L. Gunn
- April 15, 1999: Norman Jewison
- July 21, 1999: Mickey Mouse
- August 29, 1999: Frank Alvarez
- August 29, 1999: Jorge Ferreira
- September 17, 1999: Celine Dion
- September 23, 1999: Jose Lello
- September 29, 1999: Ron Huldai
- October 5, 1999: Joe Foti
- February 11, 2000: Sharon, Lois & Bram
- February 16, 2000: Archbishop Desmond Tutu
- February 29, 2000: David Boothby, Chief of Police
- March 30, 2000: Neil Young and Donald Sutherland
- June 1, 2000: Constantinos Stephanopoulos, president of the Hellenic Republic of Greece
- July 23, 2000: Pramukh Swami Maharaj
- September 21, 2000: Barenaked Ladies, pop band
- October 22, 2000: J.K. Rowling, author of the Harry Potter series of books
- January 22, 2001: Boris Spremo, photojournalist
- May 23, 2001: Constantine II of Greece, King of Greece
- May 26, 2001: Sylvester Stallone, actor
- June 5, 2001: Sophia Loren, actress
- October 16, 2001: Margaret Atwood and Joni Mitchell
- November 18, 2001: Jackie Chan, action movie star, during a charity event
- November 30, 2001: Blue Rodeo, alt-country band
- May 27, 2002: Tiger Woods
- June 8, 2002: Carlos Cesar
- July 31, 2002: Thomas Rosica
- October 4, 2002: Ronnie Hawkins
- October 20, 2002: Muhammad Ali
- November 2, 2002: Tony Dionisio
- June 25, 2003: Mike Myers
- July 8, 2003: Ferro Rodrigues
- July 28, 2003: The people of Prince Edward Island
- July 30, 2003: The Rolling Stones
- July 31, 2003: Anson Carter
- September 19, 2003: Nickelback
- September 23, 2003: Case Ootes, deputy mayor
- April 14, 2005: Julian Fantino, police chief
- October 23, 2010: Tenzin Gyatso, the 14th Dalai Lama
- June 21, 2012: George Cohon, founder of McDonald's in Canada
- March 26, 2013: George Chuvalo, heavyweight boxer
- August 20, 2013: Doug Holyday, deputy mayor
- February 12, 2016: Drake
- September 17, 2016: Rush, rock band
- September 28, 2016: Paul Beeston, president emeritus of the Toronto Blue Jays
- July 22, 2017: Mahant Swami Maharaj
- May 17, 2018: Susan Gapka, LGBT activist
- June 22, 2018: Peter Oundjian, music director of the Toronto Symphony Orchestra
- June 23, 2018: Zanana Akande, first Black woman elected to the Ontario Legislature
- June 25, 2018: Fran Sonshine, national chair of the Canadian Society for Yad Vashem
- June 30, 2018: Patricia Moore, activist
- July 25, 2018: Wilmot and Judy Matthews, philanthropists
- June 17, 2019: The Toronto Raptors, NBA team
- September 5, 2019: Robbie Robertson, musician
- November 25, 2021: Gordon Lightfoot, singer
- December 8, 2021: Andy Kim, singer
- May 11, 2022: John Honderich, journalist
- September 23, 2022: Deborah Cox, singer
- September 25, 2022: Aga Khan IV, Imam of Nizari Ismailis
- October 24, 2024: Martha Friendly, childcare advocate
- July 15, 2025: Robert Biancolin and Maurice Biancolin, owners of the Carousel Bakery at St. Lawrence Market
- July 24, 2025: Guillermo del Toro, filmmaker
- July 26, 2025: Abel "The Weeknd" Tesfaye, singer-songwriter
- September 6, 2025: Sarah Polley, filmmaker
- February 19, 2026: Joseph Yu Kai Wong, physician and philanthropist
- February 24, 2026: Itah Sadu, children's author
- March 30, 2026: Aga Khan V, Imam of Nizari Ismailis
- May 7, 2026: Maggie Kang, KPop Demon Hunters creator
- May 28, 2026: Robert G. Kearns, businessman and philanthropist
- June 1, 2026: Faith leaders in support of marriage equality (Aina-Nia Ayo’dele, Cheri DiNovo, Deana Dudley, El-Farouk Khaki, Sivasiri Visuvanatha Ranganatha Sarma, Shalom Schachter, and Blu Waters)
- July 10, 2026: Jack Oliveira, labour leader

Source: City of Toronto

=== Windsor ===
- May 9, 2009: Windsor Spitfires junior ice hockey team, for winning the J. Ross Robertson Cup
- April 15, 2010: Bill Clinton, president of the United States
- July 1, 2010: Joel Quenneville, head coach of the Chicago Blackhawks
- November 7, 2012: Richie Hawtin, electronic musician
- November 17, 2014: Eddie Francis, mayor of Windsor
- April 20, 2015: The Windsor Lancers
- September 13, 2015: Dennis Solet, long-term cancer survivor
- October 24, 2016: Commander Michael P. Desmond and the crew of the USS Detroit
- December 3, 2017: Everett Maracle, last known member of the Essex Scottish Regiment who participated in the Dieppe Raid
- May 8, 2018: Alan Wildeman, president of the University of Windsor
- October 1, 2021: Cam Gardiner, radio show host
- July 10, 2026: The Tea Party, rock band

Other recipients include Jimmy Carter, Roger Penske, and HRH Prince Michael of Kent.

== Prince Edward Island ==
=== Charlottetown ===
- 1997: Lorie Kane, golfer
- 1998: David MacEachern, Olympic bobsledder
- 2000: Charlotte Town
- 2004: Brad Richards, ice hockey player
- 2009: Brett Gallant Curling Rink, silver medallists at the World Junior Curling Championships
- September 27, 2012: Wally Hennessey, harness racing driver
- 2012: The Guardian
- 2015: HMCS Charlottetown
- May 2020: Heather Morrison, chief public health officer, and other healthcare professionals throughout the province
- May 28, 2024: Regis and Joan Duffy, community activists and philanthropists

Source: City of Charlottetown

== Quebec ==
=== Montreal ===
- December 1999: Céline Dion, singer
- October 2005: Sœur Angèle, celebrity chef
- July 2008: Just for Laughs, comedy festival
- November 2011: Anthony Calvillo, Montreal Alouettes quarterback
- July 2014: Michel Drucker, French TV host
- October 2014: Gérard Collomb, mayor of Lyon
- December 2014: Danny Maciocia, head coach of the Montreal Carabins
- May 2015: Raymond Benjamin, secretary general of the International Civil Aviation Organization
- June 2015: Al Pacino
- July 2015: Thomas Bach, president of the International Olympic Committee
- July 2016: William Shatner
- September 2016: Li Keqiang, premier of China
- March 2017: Tim Raines, Montreal Expos player
- June 2017: Jean Todt, president of the Fédération Internationale de l'Automobile
- June 2017: Sergio Mattarella, president of Italy
- July 2017: Hercule Gosselin, brigadier-general
- September 2017: Ghislain Picard, chief of the Assembly of First Nations
- September 2017: Christine Zachary-Deom, chief of the Mohawk Band Council of Kahnawake
- September 2017: Yves Jasmin, filmmaker
- September 2017: Philippe de Gaspé Beaubien, businessman
- October 2017: Ibrahim Ibrahim, bishop of the Melkite Greek Catholic Eparchy of Saint-Sauveur of Montréal
- September 2019: Greta Thunberg, Swedish environmental activist, after the September 2019 climate strike

Source: City of Montreal

== Saskatchewan ==
=== Regina ===
- July 2, 1931: Malcolm MacBeth, president of the Weekly Newspapers' Association
- 1933: Al Ritchie, coach of the Regina Pats
- May 17, 1951: June Kowalchuk, opera singer
- Kenny Shields
- October 8, 2014: Weston Dressler, Saskatchewan Roughriders player and Grey Cup champion

=== Saskatoon ===
- June 14, 1926: Saskatchewan Elks Association
- February 18, 1955: Bob Hope, entertainer
- January 21, 2004: Catriona Le May Doan, Olympic speed skater
- May 19, 2005: Elizabeth II
- September 12, 2005: HMCS Saskatoon
- June 23, 2008: Mike Weir, golfer
