= George Cunningham =

George Cunningham may refer to:

- George Cunningham (British politician) (1931–2018), British politician
- George Cunningham (baseball) (1894–1972), baseball player
- George Cunningham (footballer) (1892–?), Scottish footballer
- Sir George Cunningham (civil servant) (1888–1963), administrator in British India
- G. D. Cunningham (George Dorrington Cunningham, 1878–1948), English organist
- George T. Cunningham, founder of Cunningham's, a British Columbia pharmacy chain
- G. H. Cunningham (George Herriot Cunningham, 1892–1962), New Zealand mycologist and plant pathologist
- George I. Cunningham (1835–1902), mayor of Charleston, South Carolina
- George Cunningham (Arizona politician) (born 1945), member of the Arizona House of Representatives
- George Godfrey Cunningham (c. 1802–1860), Scottish writer, compiler, and translator
