= Cunningham Drug =

Cunningham Drug is the name of two defunct pharmacy chains:

- Cunningham Drug (Canada), originally based in Vancouver
- Cunningham Drug (U.S.), originally based in Detroit
