= Rodney Habib =

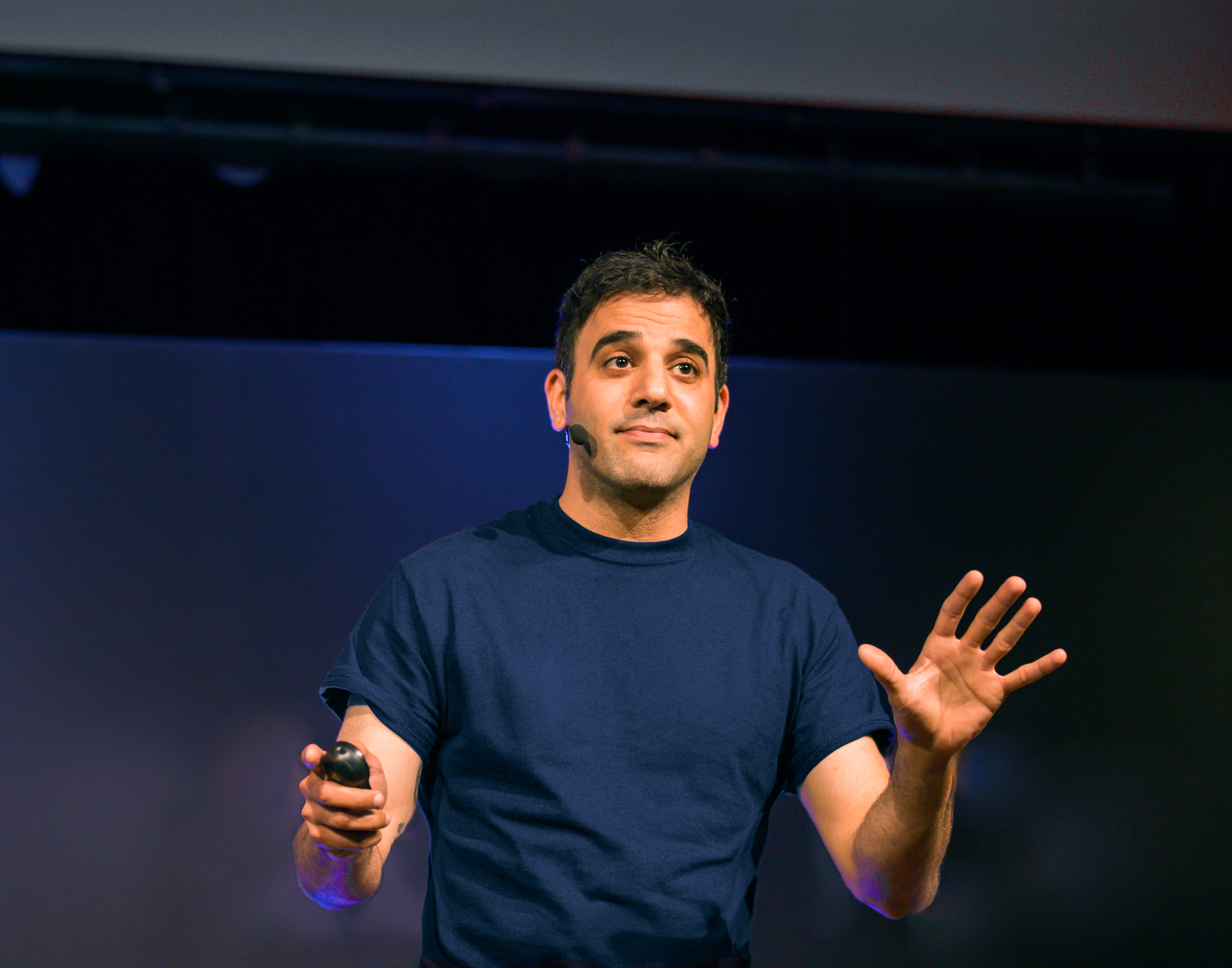
- Habib, TEDx NSCC Waterfront, 2016
- Occupations: Author, internet blogger, animal activist
- Years active: 2011–present
- Notable work: The Forever Dog (book), Planet Paws (Facebook Page), Dog Cancer Series (documentary), The Forever Dog Life (book)
- Website: rodneyhabib.com

Rodney Habib is a two time New York Times best-selling author and internet celebrity known for his educational blogging, video making, animal activism and his books, The Forever Dog and The Forever Dog Life. Habib is the founder of Planet Paws, the most liked and visited pet health page on Facebook.

== History ==
Habib opened Planet Paws, his pet store in Dartmouth, Nova Scotia on October 15, 2011. In 2012, he posted a digital image and write-up on his Facebook page of all the separate ingredients that compose a typical bag of commercial dog food; the post received half a million shares overnight.

One of his most popular posts was about rawhide chews and has been shared over 1 million times. It was followed by a video on how rawhide is made which has been viewed over 45 million times, and raised awareness of the chemicals and processes used in the creation of some rawhide chews. These video also resulted in one veterinarian, Patrick Mahaney, stating rawhide toys can be safe to use, and only chemical free rawhides should be considered.

In 2014, Habib reportedly argued booster shots for pet vaccines increased risk of immune disorders, whereas medical experts cited large, long-term studies that show the benefit of vaccination outweighs the minimal risk of the adverse immune response. He supports "core vaccinations" for young dogs and remains opposed to booster shots due to his belief that it could increase risk of immune disorders, though veterinary scientists continue to defend giving regular booster shots to maintain immunity.

By 2015 Habib was recognized by Facebook for his successful use of his blog to promote his business and was being sought around the world for advice on pet health.

By March 2016, the Planet Paws Facebook page received national news coverage when an article in the National Post stated the page had over 860,000 likes and was reported to appear in 110 million newsfeeds every six days, and had deeper Facebook reach that Canadian corporations Tim Hortons, Canadian Tire, Air Canada, Cirque du Soleil and Shoppers Drug Mart. By end of March 2016, the page was approaching 1 million likes. By July 2017 the page had exceeded 1.9 million followers, at which time Facebook administrators informed Habib that Planet Paws had become the most popular pet health page in the world.

Habib is often asked to speak on the topics related to pet nutrition and wellness despite having no recognized advanced training or degrees in animal health or nutrition. In July 2017, The Chronicle Herald reported that Habib had spent the last few years interviewing experts across the world on how to keep your pets safe and healthy with much of the information to appear in his upcoming documentary, releasing "The Dog Cancer Series: Rethinking The Canine Epidemic." in fall of 2017.

== Publications ==
Habib's first book, The Forever Dog was co-written with Dr. Karen Becker, and published by HarperCollins (US) which received a starred review from Publishers Weekly.

The book was the No. 1 best selling book on the New York Times best seller list and stayed on the list for a total of 2-weeks.

His second book, The Forever Dog Life also co-written with Dr. Karen Becker and published by HarperCollins (US) achieved New York Times Best seller status on the week of June 23, 2024,
