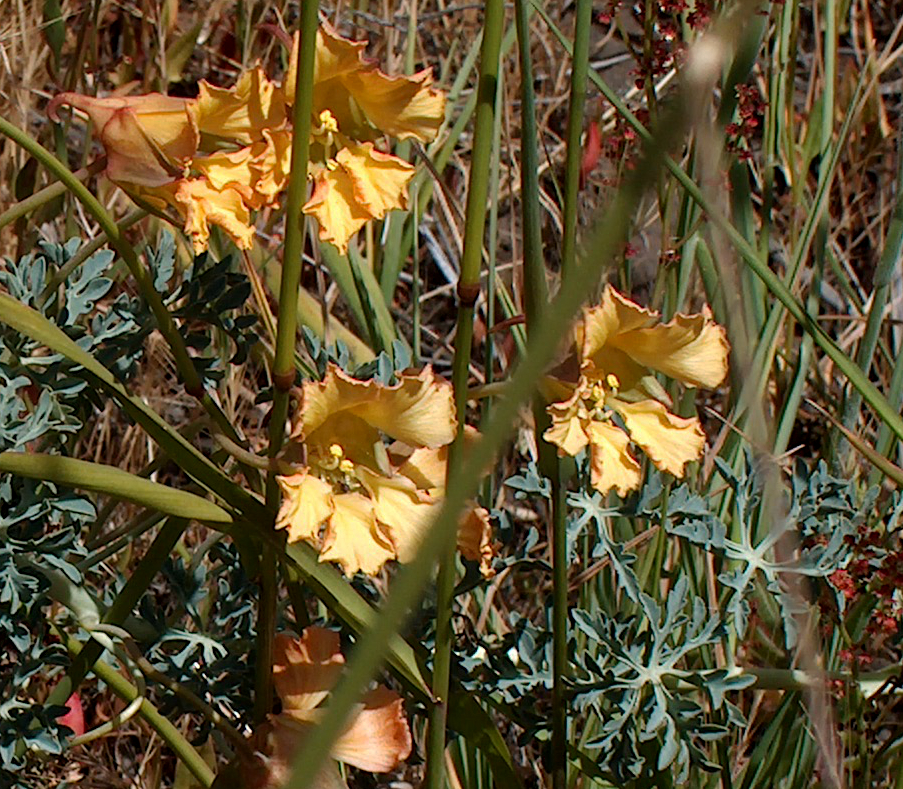

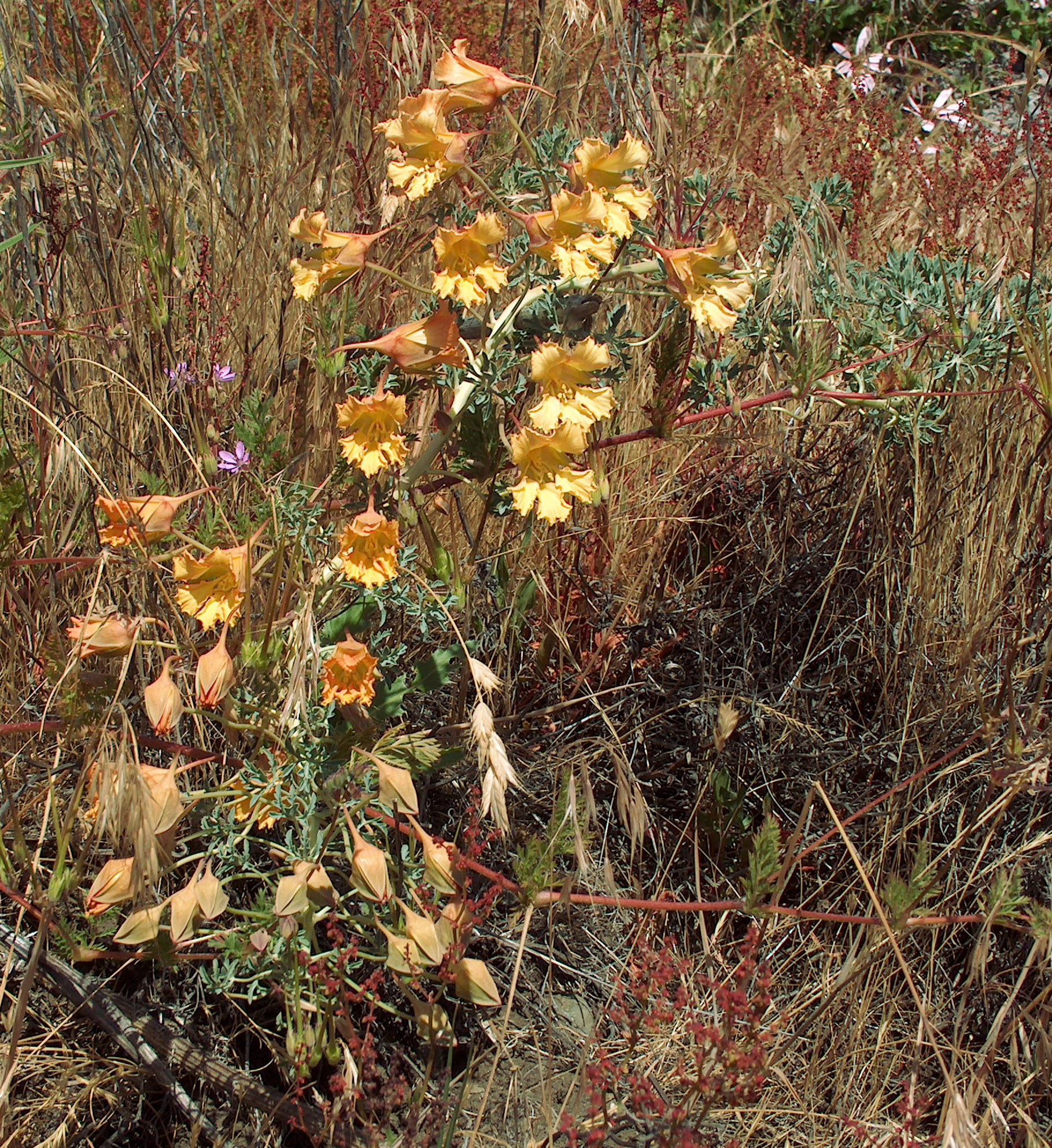

Scientific classification
- Kingdom: Plantae
- Clade: Tracheophytes
- Clade: Angiosperms
- Clade: Eudicots
- Clade: Rosids
- Order: Brassicales
- Family: Tropaeolaceae
- Genus: Tropaeolum
- Species: T. incisum

Binomial name
- Tropaeolum incisum (Speg.) Sparre

Synonyms
- T. polyphyllum var. incisum; T. polyphyllum forma schizophyllum

= Tropaeolum incisum =

Species of flowering plant

Tropaeolum incisum is a species of nasturtium, with flaring petals in shades of yellow and peach, when still in bud and on the outside darker, more orange-brown and sometimes stained purple, with creeping or climbing stems, in the wild up to about 60 cm long with deeply divided, blue-grey leaves, with undulating lobes, that grows on the dry eastern side of the southern Andes mountains.

== Description ==
Tropaeolum incisum is a perennial herbaceous plant with a tuber deep underground and a usually unbranched, procumbent and sometimes climbing stem of usually up to about 60 cm long and 4 mm in diameter. The plant is entirely without hairs. The leaves are alternate and without stipule, with leafstems of 2–5 cm long and leafblades approximately round (1½-3½ cm), palmately divided into five to nine (mostly seven) blue-grey leaflets, with thin purplish edges particularly on younger growth. These leaflets are themselves deeply pinnately incised with two to seven lanceolate lobes, which in turn may have some teeth, with a blunt tip that sometimes ends abruptly in a sharp point and which are folded in a V-shape along their midveins. The flowers are bisexual and zygomorphic, are carried on stems of 4–10 cm long. The calyx consists of five sepals which are yellowish, apricot or blue-grey and sometimes tinged with purple, with triangular equal size lobes (8–13×4–8 mm), with a slender spur of 12–20 mm long, with a narrow base. The petals are a compromised yellow, pinkish yellow, orange-yellow or dark yellow with purple veins and have a more or less red-purplish staining on back of lobes. The petals consist of a claw and plate (or lamina) and the upper two have an almost elliptical lamina, with a blunt tip and wavy margins, each about 12–17×5–12 mm, while the lower three have longer claws, are indented at the tip and about 10–17×3–10 mm. Tropaeolum species have eight stamens. Pollen is approximately 17½×13 μm, radial symmetric, rounded triangular, tricolpate, flattened (or oblate), with short furrows of about 4 μm. The superior three-carpelled ovary when ripe will split in three blackish one-seeded parts (mericarps) of 5–6 mm long. In good garden soil plants grow more vigorous and climb up to 2 m. In its native area it flowers from September to February.

=== Differences with related species ===
Tropaeolum incisum looks a lot like T. polyphyllum, which also has stems that spread across the soil and has greyish blue leaves. The leaves of T. incisum however are larger and more grey rather than blue, while the leaflets are deeper divided and have strongly undulating edges. The flowers of both species are similar however, although T. polyphyllum may have a brighter yellow color.

== Taxonomy ==
Genetic analysis suggests that T. incisum is closely related to T. polyphyllum as well as T. leptophyllum. T. myriophyllum might originate from a cross between T. leptophyllum and T. incisum.

== Distribution and ecology ==
Tropaeolum incisum is concentrated in the Argentinean lake district of northern Patagonia (northern Chubut, western Río Negro, Neuquén, and southern Mendoza Provinces), and can also be found in neighboring Chile but only near the passes. It may grow at elevations up to 3000 m. It grows in arid, sandy fields and low scree in the rain shadow of the Andes. Hyposchila galactodice, a butterfly belonging to the Pieridae that occurs in western Patagonia, Argentina, is a specialist feeding on Tropaeolum incisum.

== Cultivation ==
Tropaeolum incisum is sometimes grown as an ornamental and is on offer from several seed companies and nurseries. It can best be grown in free draining soil in full sunlight and avoiding competition, such as in a bulb frame or alpine house, particularly in climates that are moist during the plant's hibernation period.
