= PC Optimum =

Canadian retail loyalty program by the Loblaw Companies

- Predecessor: PC Plus; Shoppers Optimum
- Founded: February 1, 2018; 8 years ago
- Owner: Loblaw Companies
- Website: www.pcoptimum.ca

The PC Optimum mobile app running on an iPhone.

PC Optimum is a single loyalty program operated by Canadian retail conglomerate Loblaw Companies; it was created through the merger of Loblaws' PC Plus and Shoppers Drug Mart's Shoppers Optimum programs.

Launched on 1 February 2018, the program allows shoppers to earn points based on specific purchases at Loblaw grocery store locations, including in-store promotions, personalized offers delivered via the PC Optimum website and mobile app, as well as per-dollar spent on eligible products at Shoppers Drug Mart, Esso and Mobil locations. These points can be redeemed in-store for grocery and other purchases.

The program is available to Loblaw supermarket affiliates.

== History ==
=== PC Plus ===
PC Plus launched as a digital loyalty program in May 2013.

In January 2017, an Ottawa man was arrested for fraud and money laundering for the redemption of points from stolen PC Plus accounts to purchase gift cards worth hundreds of dollars in value.

=== PC Optimum ===
On February 1, 2018, the PC Plus program merged with Shoppers Drug Mart's similar Optimum program (Loblaw Companies had previously acquired the chain) to form PC Optimum. Users were instructed to transition their existing PC Plus and Optimum accounts online or do so in person and exchange their cards at Loblaw grocery or Shoppers Drug Mart locations. There were also several technical issues on-launch, including errors when creating an account on the PC Optimum app, the PC Optimum website being down for several hours, stores not giving out new cards, as well as some users' points not being transferred to the new service correctly. Loblaw acknowledged these difficulties, stating that they were aware "that the transition has not been smooth for some", and were working with customers to rectify them.

Several glitches and errors were related to the launch of the PC Optimum program; such as difficulty in merging points, missing and stolen points, and several technical issues. According to a Loblaw financial report, the expenses associated with the creation of the PC Optimum brand was 189 million dollars.

On March 13, 2018, Loblaw announced that Imperial Oil would switch to PC Optimum as the main loyalty program for its Esso-branded gas stations, ending a 14-year relationship with Aeroplan. PC Optimum is also accepted at the gas stations of sister brand Mobil, which launched in Canada as part of the 2017 acquisition of Loblaw's gas station network by Brookfield Business Partners. The partnership officially launched August 2018, with 10 points being awarded for every litre of gas and every dollar spent on other eligible purchases (including car washes and convenience store purchases).

In April 2019, Loblaw announced a trial program under which customers can receive free bonus points for opting into online behavioural advertising based on information associated with their PC Optimum accounts.

In 2024, an investigation was launched by the Office of the Privacy Commissioner of Canada in regards to the ability to delete PC Optimum accounts.

== Operations ==
Customers earn points for purchasing specific weekly "loaded offers" (which are managed from the PC Optimum website and mobile app) based on purchasing habits, or through in-store promotions tied to specific purchases or coupons. PC Financial credit card users also earn points based on the dollar value of all purchases placed on the card through any retailer. The rate of point acquisition varies depending on which credit card is used, and whether or not the purchase made was at a Loblaw-affiliated store. For example, if a purchase was made at a participating Loblaw affiliate, then the stated rate is 10 points for every dollar spent on a PC Mastercard, 20 points per dollar on a PC World Mastercard and 30 points per dollar on a PC World Elite Mastercard. As 1000 PC Points are valued at $1, the minimum rate of return is 1%. Promotions are sometimes used to give bonus points on specific products.

Points can be redeemed for free groceries or other rewards. Points may be redeemed once a customer has reached a total of 10,000 or more (1,000 points = CA$1). Customers must also have a second form of payment once points are redeemed (as customers can only use points in multiples of 10,000) if they do not want to overspend their points. Points can not be redeemed for gift cards, alcohol, tobacco, lottery tickets, or prescription medication.

Unlike many other retail loyalty schemes, customers must buy specific products to earn points. It is possible to spend several hundred dollars in a single grocery transaction and not receive any points at all through the standard loyalty program. Specific credit cards affiliated with Loblaws offer bonus points based on purchases themselves. One such credit card is President's Choice Financial.

== PC Insiders ==
Announced in November 2017 as a pilot program, PC Insiders is a $99 per year (or $9.99 per month) pilot program for PC Plus members. The program includes bonus points on diapers, infant formula, PC Organics products, Joe Fresh products, and on the Shoppers Drug Mart beauty website. In addition, subscribers receive free order pickup with PC Express, complimentary online shipping, and a PC Travel credit. In December 2018, the program exited its pilot phase and became available to all PC Optimum members.

== See also ==
- Air Miles
- Canadian Tire money
- Scene+
