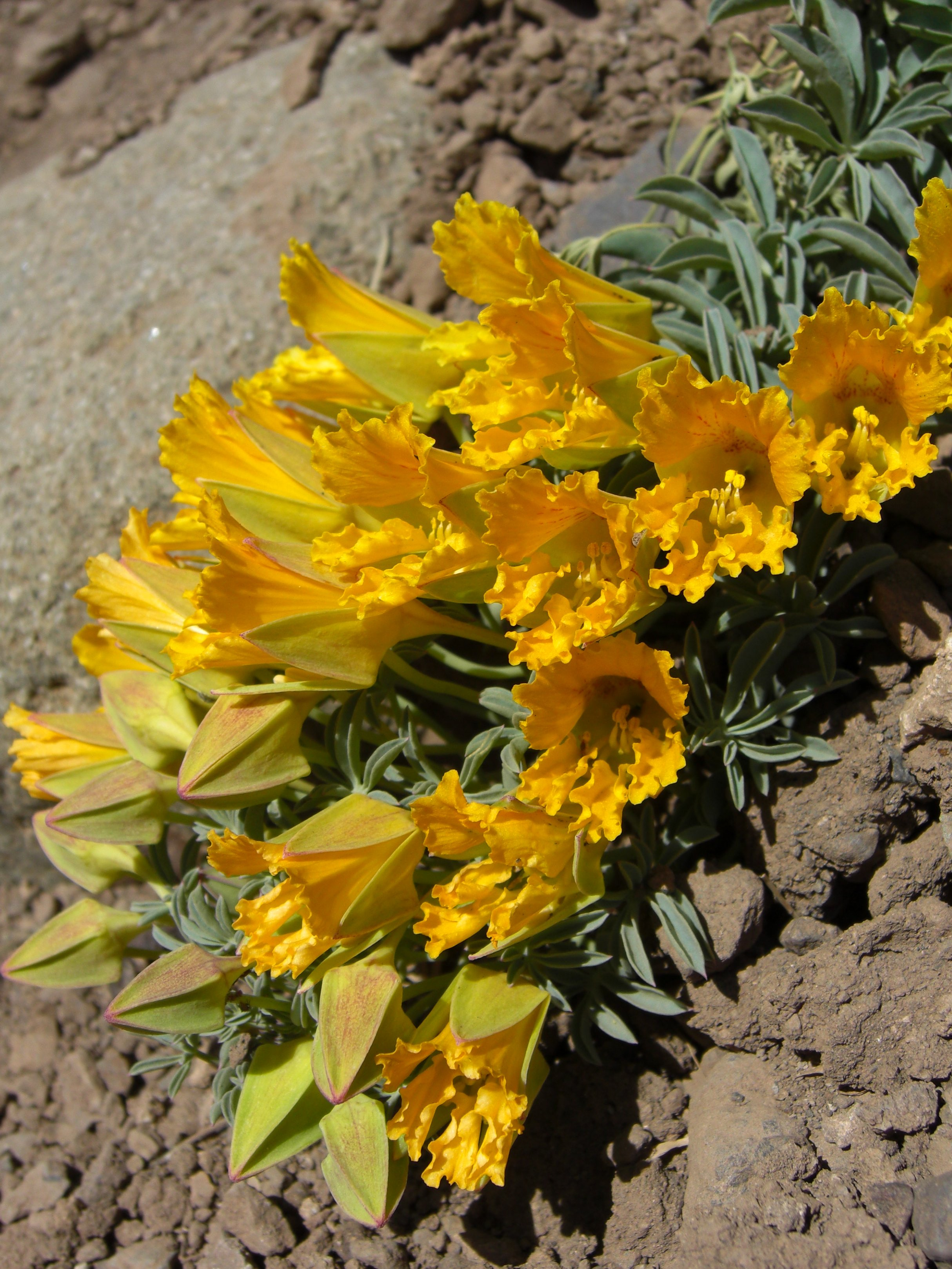
- In Chile

Scientific classification
- Kingdom: Plantae
- Clade: Embryophytes
- Clade: Tracheophytes
- Clade: Spermatophytes
- Clade: Angiosperms
- Clade: Eudicots
- Clade: Rosids
- Order: Brassicales
- Family: Tropaeolaceae
- Genus: Tropaeolum
- Species: T. polyphyllum

Binomial name
- Tropaeolum polyphyllum Cav.

= Tropaeolum polyphyllum =

Species of flowering plant

Tropaeolum polyphyllum is a species of flowering plant in the nasturtium family Tropaeolaceae. It is endemic to mountainous regions of Chile and Argentina where it is called in Spanish soldadito grande de la cordillera (great soldier of the mountains).

== Description ==
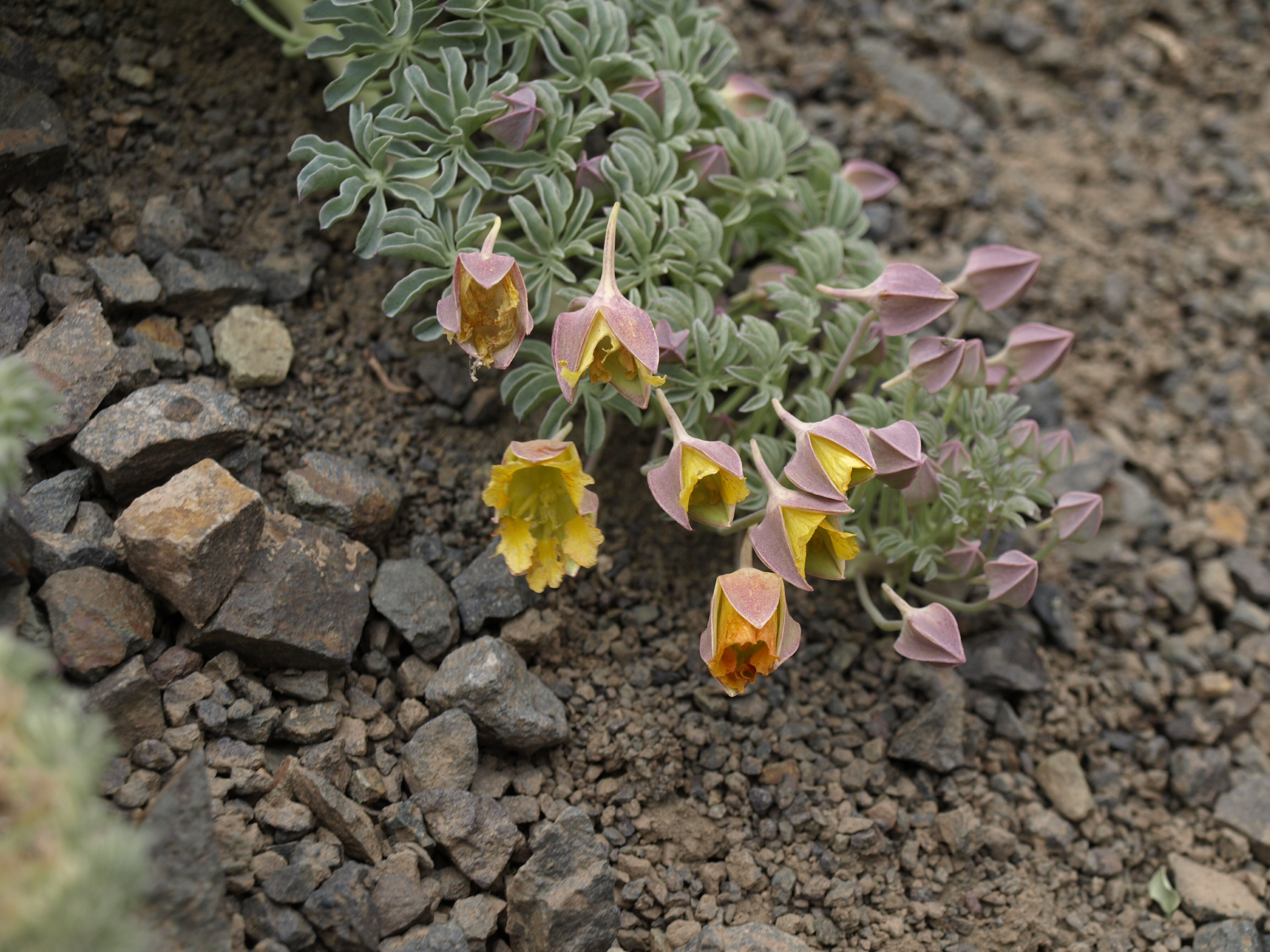
In Chile

This herbaceous perennial overwinters as a tuber deep in the soil. It sends out long rhizomes from which shoots develop which trail over the ground. These are densely covered with silvery green, deeply lobed leaves. The flower buds have inflated pale green calyces and the sepals are extended backward into a short spur. The relatively large and showy flowers are borne on long slender stalks and are golden yellow. After flowering, which takes place in mid-summer, the shoots die back and the plant remains dormant until the following year.

== Distribution and habitat ==
Tropaeolum polyphyllum is endemic to the central Andes in Chile and Argentina where it grows at heights of up to 3,000 metres (9,800 ft) above sea level. Its typical habitat is among scantily vegetated stony ground or on scree where it forms small hummocks of grey-green foliage studded with yellow flowers. In this area, summer droughts may last for several months and what precipitation there is, falls mainly in the winter. The plant has small, rounded tubers which are buried deep in the ground and which enable it to survive being covered with snow for several months and withstand temperatures down to −20 °C (−4 °F).

== Cultivation ==
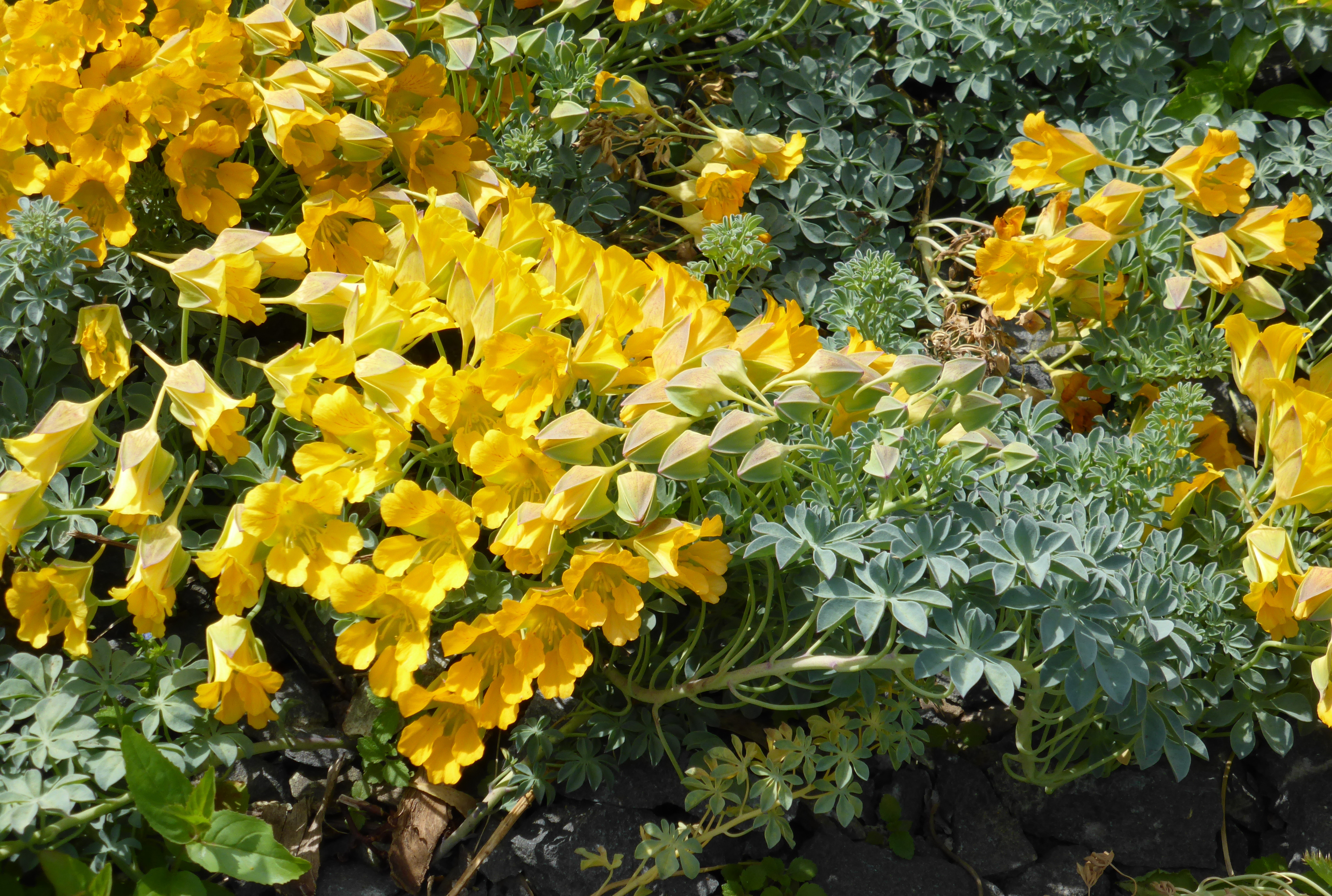
At VanDusen Botanical Garden

Tropaeolum polyphyllum needs full sun and neutral or slightly acid, well drained soil. It grows well on hot, dry banks and is hardy when fully established. Propagate from tubers or by seed. The seeds should be sown in the spring in well-drained compost and covered with 1 to 2 cm (0.4 to 0.8 in) of sand. The containers should be kept at below 4 °C (39 °F) until the seedlings appear in about a month. Too high a temperature inhibits germination. The USDA Hardiness Zone is 7.
