= Whitford Julian VanDusen =

Canadian lumber magnate (1889–1978)

Whitford Julian VanDusen (July 18, 1889 in Tara, Ontario – December 15, 1978), was a Canadian lumber magnate and philanthropist, who established the Vancouver Foundation. The VanDusen Botanical Garden in Vancouver was named after him.
