= George T. Cunningham =

American-born Canadian businessman and druggist

- Born: George Torrance Cunningham; February 18, 1889; Dunseith, North Dakota, USA
- Died: March 7, 1965 (aged 76); Palm Springs, California, USA
- Occupations: businessman, druggist
- Known for: Cunningham's

George Torrance Cunningham (February 12, 1889 – March 7, 1965) was an American-born Canadian businessman and the founder of Cunningham's, the 52-store British Columbia pharmacy chain that later became part of Shoppers Drug Mart. Cunningham was also an alderman, a member of the Vancouver School Board and was on the Board of Governors of the University of British Columbia for 30 years. He was awarded an honorary doctorate from the university after his death for his philanthropy, public service and dedication to education.

Cunningham was also involved in athletics in Vancouver in the 1920s, as a president of the Vancouver Amateur Ice Hockey Association, as well as a manager of the Vancouver Monarchs ice hockey team.

Cunningham was born in Dunseith, North Dakota in February 1889 but came to Vancouver with his family as a child. He died while on vacation in Palm Springs, California in March 1965.
