= VanDusen Botanical Garden =

Botanical garden in Vancouver, British Columbia, Canada

Coordinates: 49°14′23″N 123°07′56″W

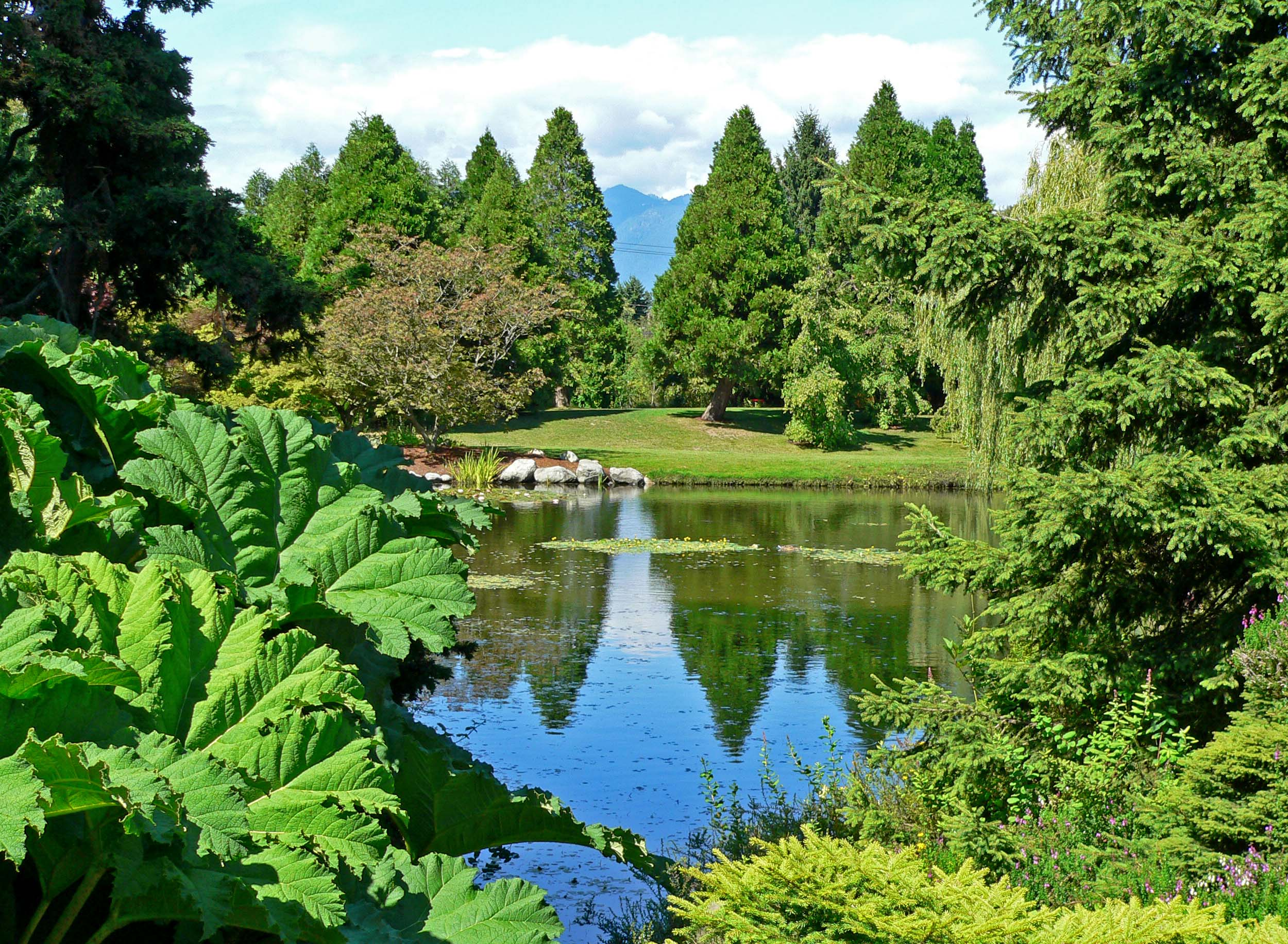
- View of VanDusen Botanical Garden across one of the ponds, to the mountains north of Vancouver
- Interactive map of VanDusen Botanical Garden
- Type: Botanical garden
- Location: Shaughnessy, Vancouver, British Columbia, Canada
- Area: 22 ha (54 acres)
- Established: August 30, 1975
- Manager: Vancouver Park Board and the Vancouver Botanical Gardens Association
- Status: Open year round (except Christmas)
- Website: vandusengarden.org

VanDusen Botanical Garden is a botanical garden in Vancouver, British Columbia, in the Shaughnessy neighborhood. It is located at the northwest corner of 37th Avenue and Oak Street. It is named for local lumberman and philanthropist Whitford Julian VanDusen.

== History ==
In 1970, the Vancouver Foundation, the British Columbia provincial government, and the city of Vancouver signed an agreement to provide the funding to develop a public garden on part of the old Shaughnessy Golf Course. The Botanical Garden opened to the public on August 30, 1975 and remains jointly managed by the Vancouver Park Board and the Vancouver Botanical Gardens Association (VBGA), similar to the operation of nearby Bloedel Conservatory.

Opened in November 2011, the Garden's Visitor Centre was designed and built to a LEED Platinum standard. This modern structure features a gift/garden shop, a specialized botanical library, a restaurant and a coffee shop. The VanDusen Botanical Garden Visitors Center project, registered with the International Living Future Institute, is pursuing a Living Building Challenge certification.

The building was constructed under the direction Cornelia Oberlander landscape architect, Perkins and Will Canada architects, Morrison Hershfield energy consultants, Fast + Epp structural engineers, StructureCraft timber design-builders, and Ledcor Construction Limited.

== Staff and volunteers ==
VanDusen's volunteers have a 45-year history in the garden and often exhibit a proprietary connection to the trees, shrubs and annuals. Trained volunteer guides interpret the plant collection and the history of the garden to visitors on foot and in motorized golf carts from April through October (see web site for actual dates, the carts have a limited season). In addition to guiding tours, volunteers collect seeds of annuals and perennials (which they clean and package for sale in the garden shop and on the Internet). Other volunteers operate the information desk, staff a large and very successful plant sale each spring, write and produce self-guided tours to hand out to visitors, package manure and compost for sale to local gardeners, and work with Park Board staff to install plant identification signs in the garden.

== Features and mission ==
The Garden covers 22 hectares (55 acres). In addition to displays of plants from all over the world, there is an extensive collection of native British Columbia (Northwest Coast) plants. A recently launched "re-wilding" outreach program aims to rescue and propagate native plants for reintroduction into Vancouver's regional parks.

In addition to water features throughout the rolling landscape, special features in the garden include carved totem poles, a small Japanese garden and large stone sculptures. Children enjoy the maze adjacent to VanDusen's heirloom vegetable garden.

Although the garden's mission statement upholds the ideals of a botanical garden, an early decision not to partake in scientific research channeled funds and energy into garden construction and released the staff from the responsibility of building research collections or a herbarium. The VBGA conducts citizen science initiatives and works with local community partners and schools interested in on-site research.

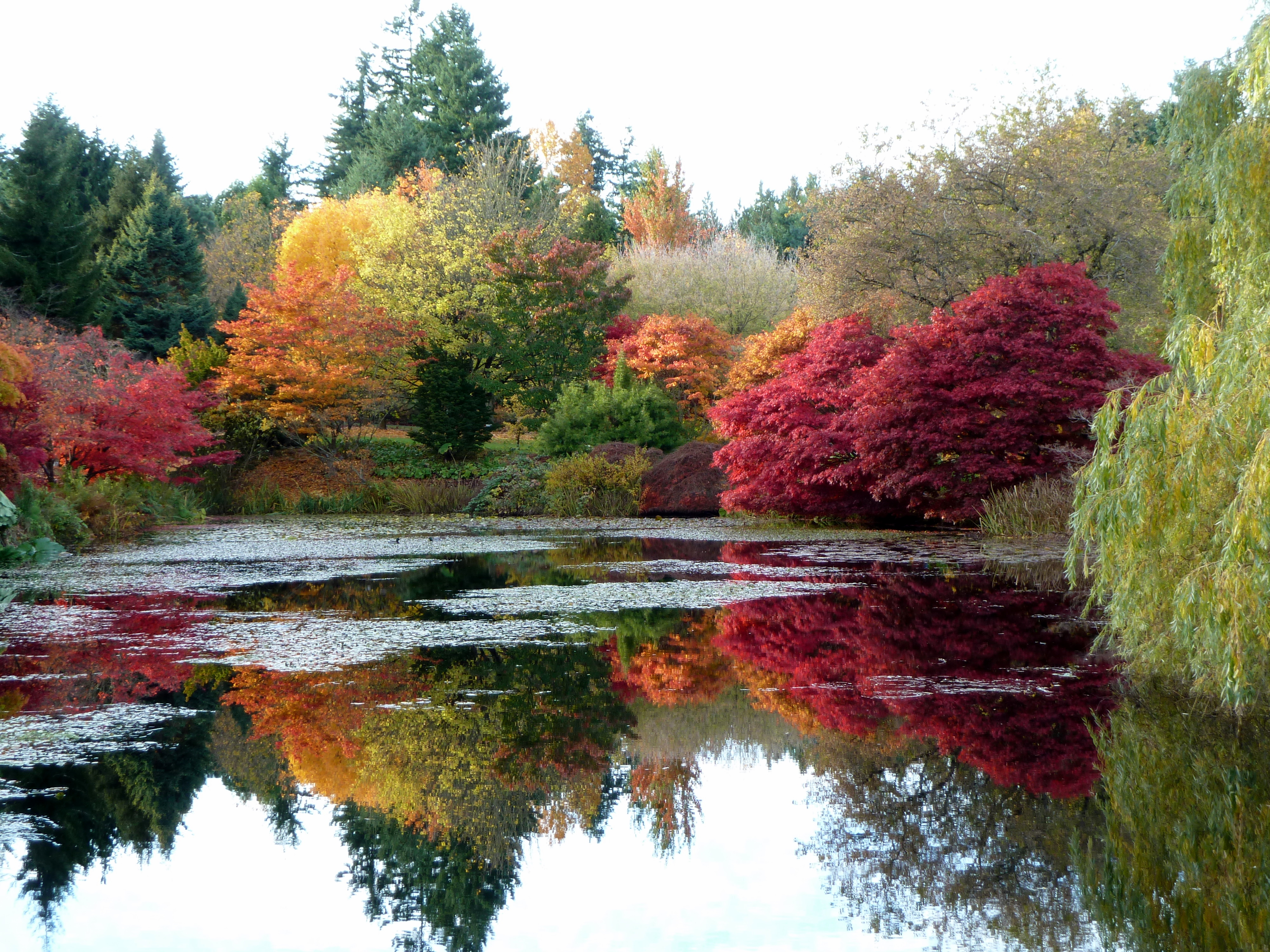
Autumn colours at VanDusen Botanical Garden, 2011

== Plantings and events ==
May is Rhodo time at VanDusen and visitors are treated to a large colourful collection of species and hybridized Rhododendron cultivars. The collection is estimated at nearly 1,000 different varieties of rhodos. Some can be found blooming virtually year round, with intense blooms of species rhodos in the Sino Himalayan garden in the late months of winter. Also of note are cultivars of Fagus sylvatica, as well as collections of Sorbus, Fraxinus and Magnolia.

Specialized niche plantings include a Heather garden, a "black" garden, a seasonal "Laburnum Walk", a majestic stand of Sequoiadendron giganteum, a cypress pond, a formal perennial garden, a heritage vegetable garden (seasonal), a fragrance garden (seasonal) of course, and the large sino-Himalayan garden which covers about eight acres by itself.

== Admission ==
The garden is open to the public every day of the year except Christmas. There are admission fees for day visitors and memberships (family and individual) for repeat visitors.

== Awards ==
R. Roy Forster was recognized with the Order of Canada on April 14, 1999, for his work in designing the gardens and their plant collections. Forester continued earlier landscape work established by Bill Livingston of the Vancouver Park Board. Appreciation for Forster's contribution to the design of the garden was recognized recently by VBGA renaming Cypress Pond the Roy Forster Pond.

== Gallery ==
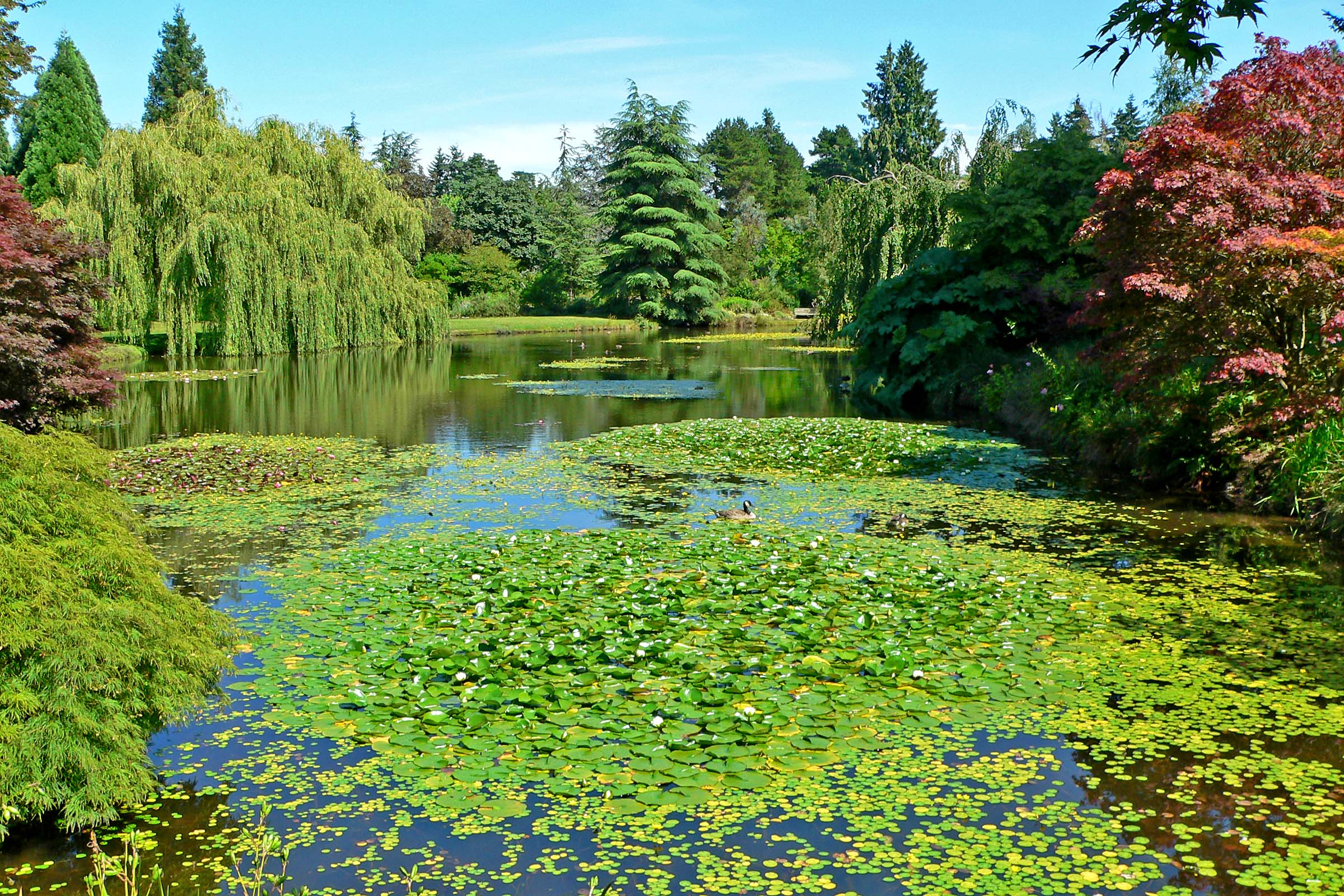

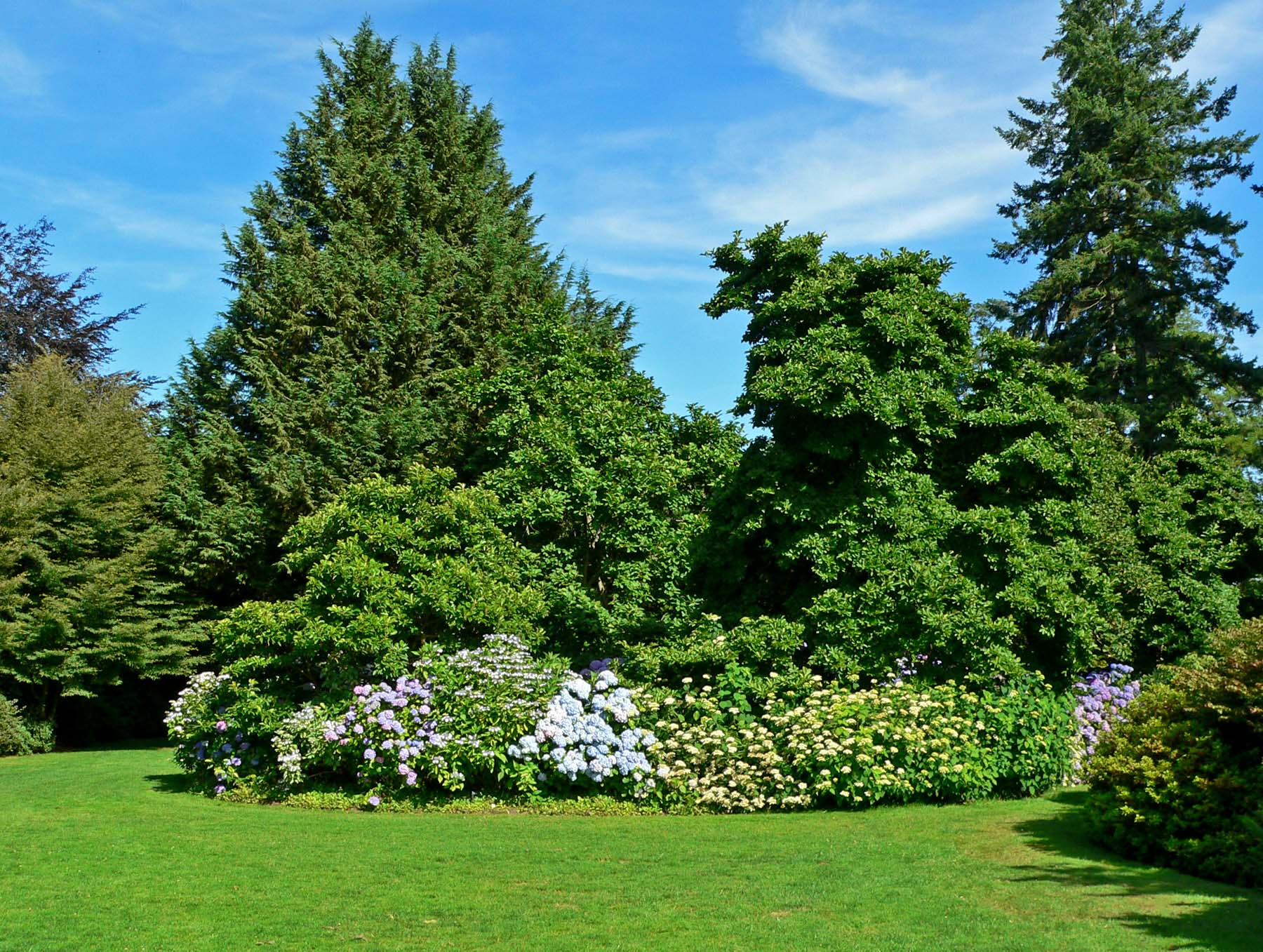

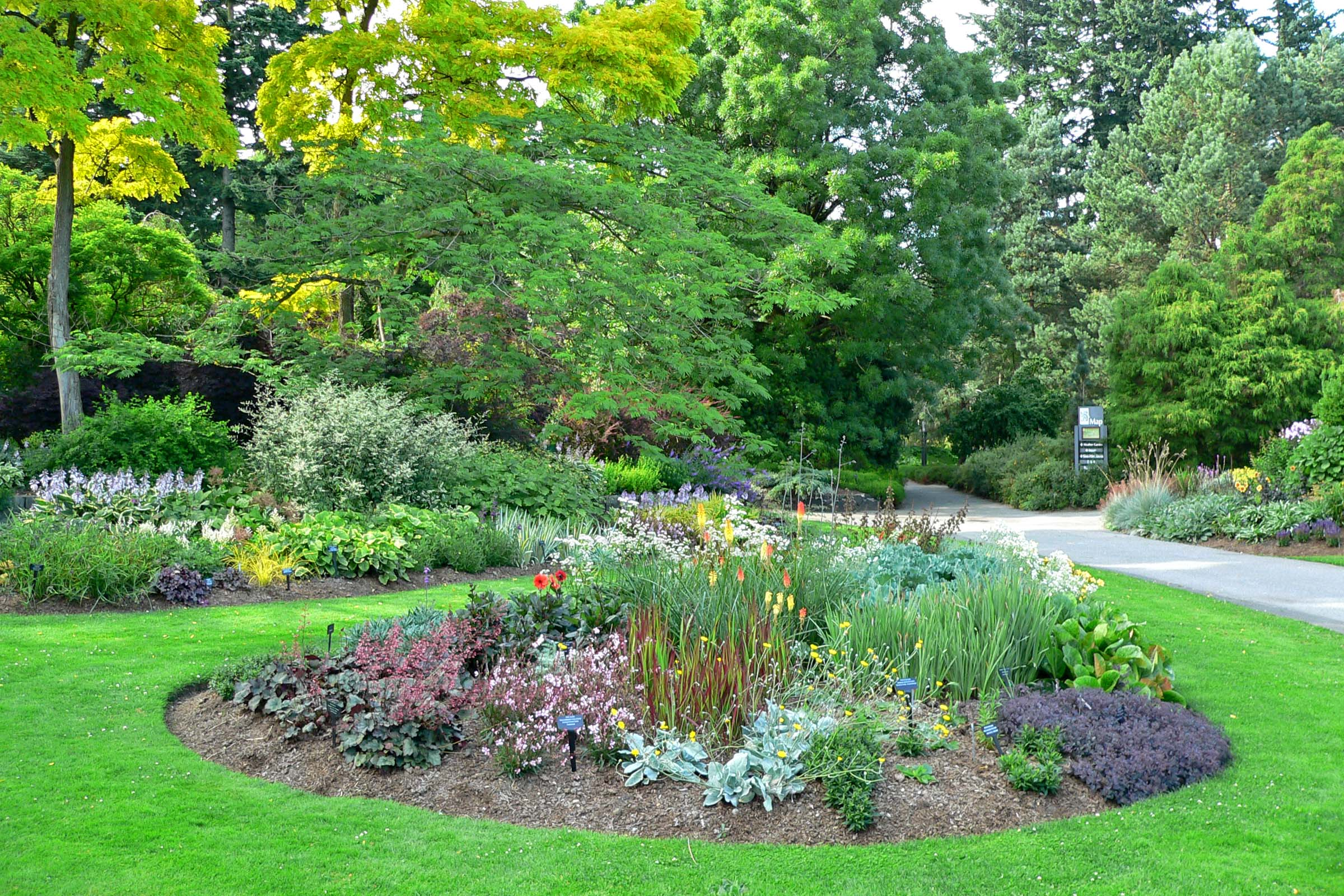

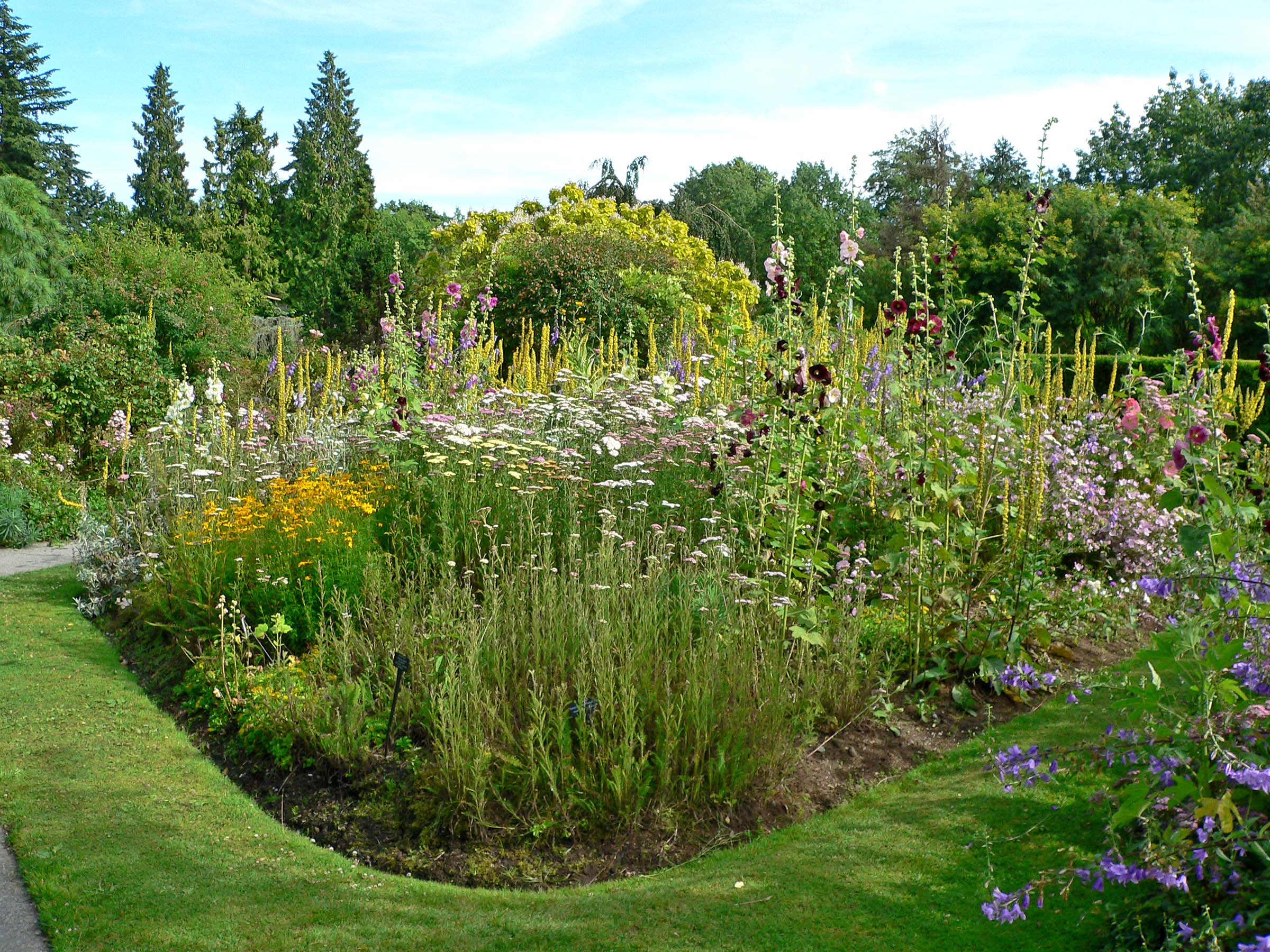

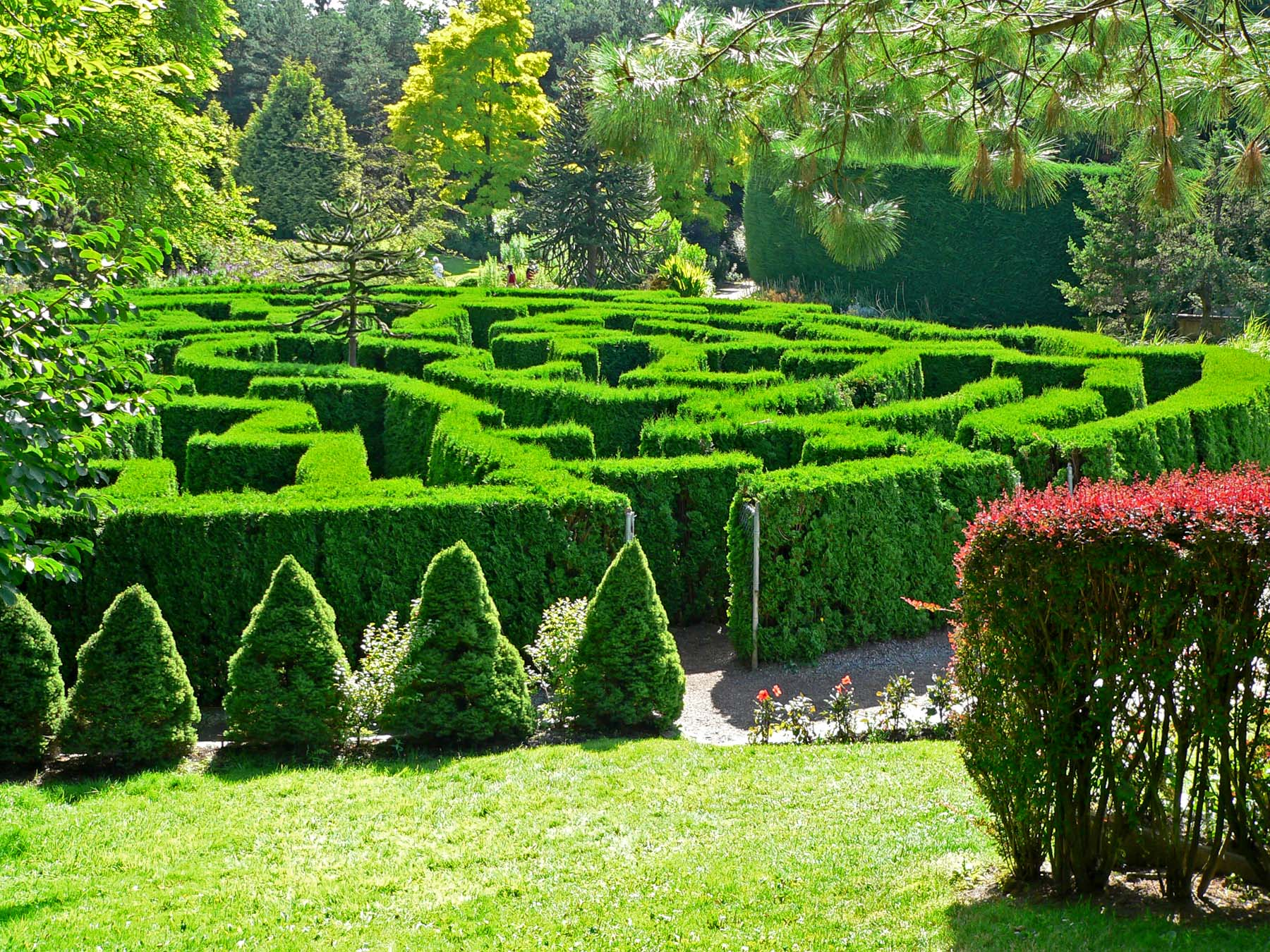

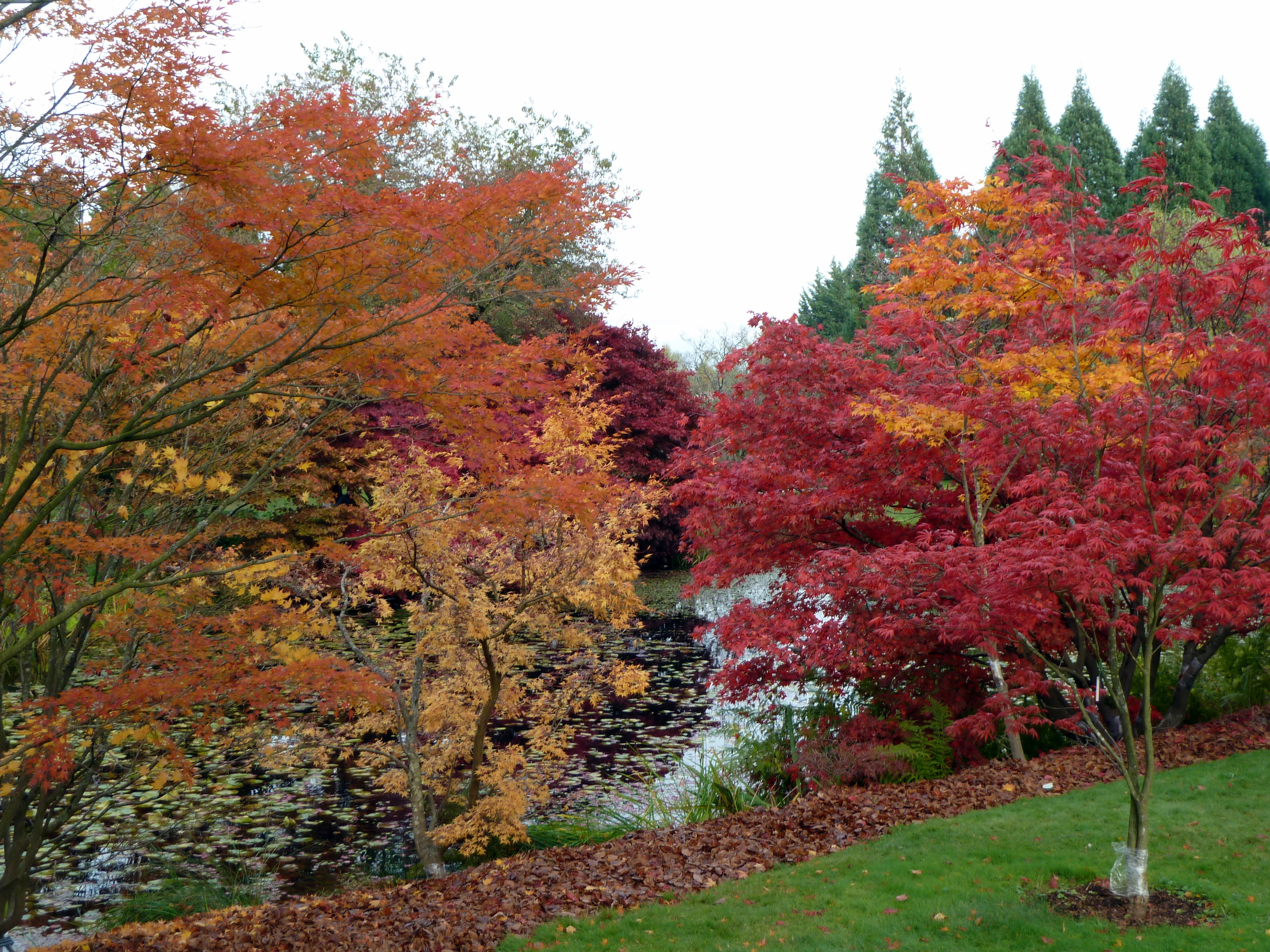

== See also ==
- List of botanical gardens in Canada
- Seed library
