= George Cunningham (footballer) =

Scottish footballer

Personal information
- Full name: George Bruce Cunningham
- Date of birth: 30 January 1892
- Place of birth: Dennistoun, Scotland
- Position: Forward

Senior career*
Years	Team	Apps	(Gls)
1912–1915	Queen's Park	6	(0)
- * Club domestic league appearances and goals

George Bruce Cunningham was a Scottish amateur footballer who played as a forward in the Scottish League for Queen's Park.

== Personal life ==
As of 1911, Cunningham was working as a clerk in a hide leather factory in Glasgow. Cunningham served as a private in the Royal Northumberland Fusiliers during the First World War.

== Career statistics ==
Appearances and goals by club, season and competition
Club	Season	League			Scottish Cup		Other		Total	
Club	Season	Division	Apps	Goals	Apps	Goals	Apps	Goals	Apps	Goals
Queen's Park	1912–13	Scottish First Division	5	0	0	0	0	0	5	0
Queen's Park	1913–14	Scottish First Division	1	0	0	0	1 (Note: Appearance in Glasgow Merchants Charity Cup)	0	2	0
Career total			6	0	0	0	1	0	7	0
