= Vancouver Foundation =

Canadian not-for-profit organization

- Founded: Incorporated 1943 (established by act of the Provincial legislature, 1950)
- Purpose: Community foundation
- Headquarters: 1075 W Georgia Street
- Location: Vancouver, British Columbia, Canada
- Region served: British Columbia
- Key people: President & CEO, Kevin McCort
- Endowment: CAD$1.5 billion
- Website: vancouverfoundation.ca

The Vancouver Foundation is a not-for-profit organization based in Vancouver, British Columbia and one of largest of the 201 community foundations in Canada. Their mission statement is "to harness the gifts of energy, ideas, time, and money to make meaningful and lasting impacts in communities." The foundation administers over 1,800 funds and assets totalling over CAD$1.5 billion, on behalf of individuals, families, corporations and charities.

== History ==
Vancouver Foundation was founded in 1943 by Alice MacKay who had saved $1,000 from her secretarial job and wanted to help homeless women trapped in a cycle of poverty. Inspired by MacKay, lumberman and philanthropist Whitford Julian VanDusen oversaw the establishment and incorporation of the foundation. VanDusen added $10,000 to the endowment and encouraged nine friends to match his own gift for a total initial fund of $101,000. In 1950, the Foundation was incorporated by the Legislature of British Columbia in a Special Act.

== Activities ==
While it is named after Vancouver, the mandate of the organization is broader, with about 70 percent of grant amounts received within the Lower Mainland region with the remainder in other parts of the province. Grant recipients range from social services to medical research groups, to organizations devoted to arts and culture, the environment, education, children and families, youth, and animal welfare. By 2015, the Vancouver Foundation, in partnership with its donors, had distributed more than $1 billion to community projects and programs.

It has facilitated donations to the Kingsway Community Station, which supports sex workers near Kingsway. It gave grants to BC Unclaimed, which operated a scheme to reunite individuals in British Columbia with abandoned bank accounts and unclaimed court payments.

As of 2017, grant recipients were required to release their work under Creative Commons licence, which permits anyone to use the product freely without copyright limitations.
