= Cunningham Drug (Canada) =

Cunningham Drug Stores Ltd.
- Company type: Pharmacy chain
- Industry: Pharmacy
- Founded: 1911
- Defunct: 1971
- Fate: Chain purchased by Shoppers Drug Mart
- Headquarters: Vancouver, British Columbia
- Products: Pharmaceuticals, health/beauty/tobacco products, and grocery.

Cunningham Drug Stores Ltd. (Cunningham's for short) was a regional pharmacy chain based in British Columbia, Canada.

== History ==
Cunningham's was established in February 1911 when New Westminster native George T. Cunningham, a druggist formerly employed by the Woodwards department store chain, opened his first store in Vancouver, at the corner of Denman and Nelson Streets. Cunningham expanded his chain in September 1939 when he acquired the Vancouver Drug Stores chain, nearly tripling the size of the Cunningham's chain from 12 stores to 35.

At its peak, 100 drug stores in British Columbia and Alberta bore the Cunningham's name. Cunningham was a Vancouver city councilor from 1955 to 1957 and served as chair of the University of British Columbia Board of Governors.

Cunningham died in Palm Springs, California on March 7, 1965, at age 76, and the drug store chain bearing his name was sold to the expanding Shoppers Drug Mart on September 26, 1971.
