= Shoppers Drug Mart =

Canadian pharmacy chain; a subsidiary of Loblaw Companies

Shoppers Drug Mart Inc.

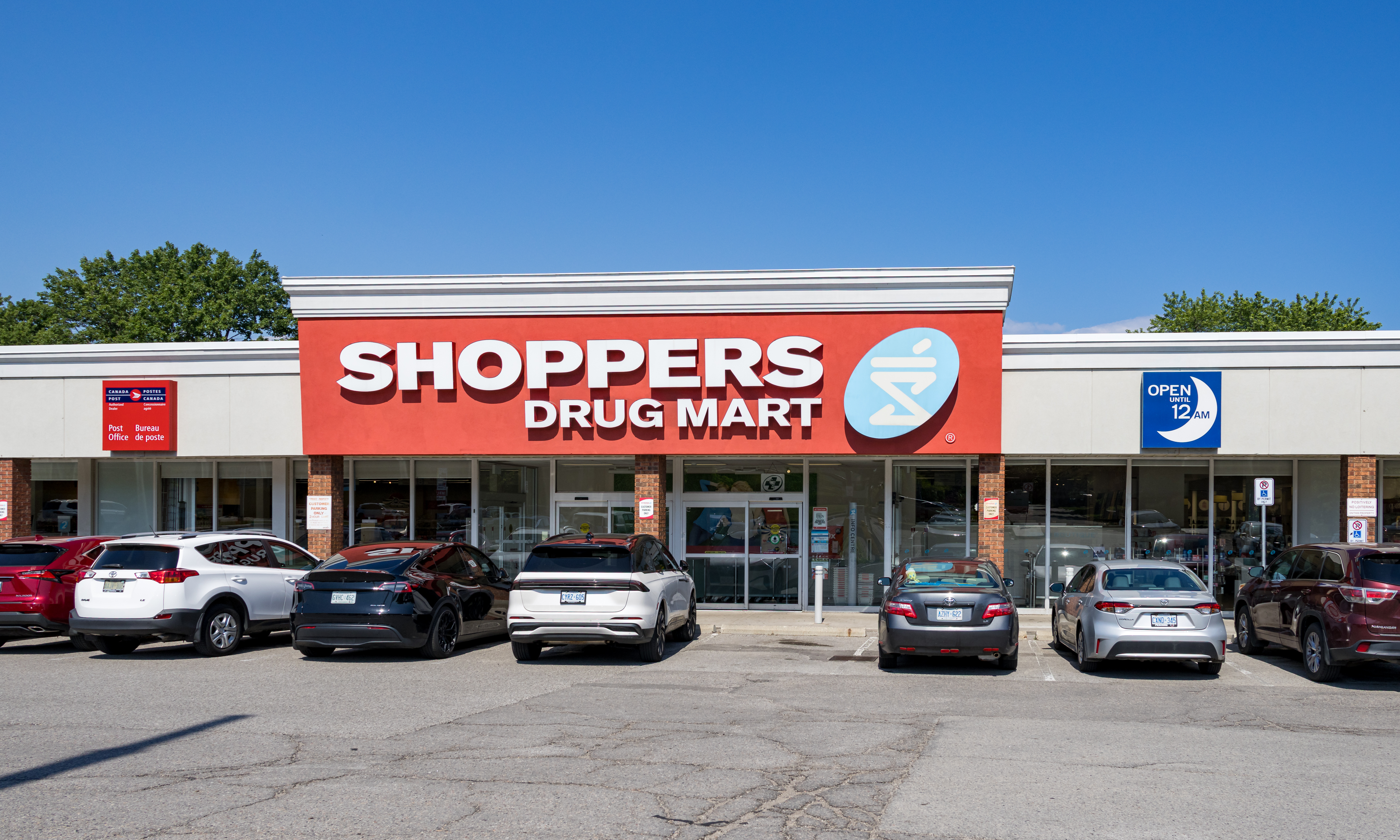
- A Shoppers Drug Mart in Scarborough, Ontario
- Type: Subsidiary
- Industry: Retail and pharmacy
- Founded: 1962; 64 years ago
- Founder: Murray Koffler
- Headquarters: Toronto, Ontario, Canada
- Number of locations: 1,307 (Shoppers Drug Mart and Pharmaprix); 56 (Shoppers Home Health Care)
- Key people: Gregers Wedell-Wedellsborg - President
- Products: Health and personal care products
- Parent: Imasco (1986–2000); Loblaw Companies (2014–present)
- Subsidiaries: Murale
- Website: www.shoppersdrugmart.ca

Shoppers Drug Mart Inc. (colloquially Shoppers; named Pharmaprix in Quebec) is a Canadian retail pharmacy chain based in Toronto, Ontario. It has more than 1,300 stores in ten provinces and two territories.

The company was founded by pharmacist Murray Koffler in 1962; the Koffler family retains ownership of the Super-Pharm pharmacy, which has locations in Israel, Poland, and formerly in China (as Ensure from 2005 to 2011). Super-Pharm's logo is similar to that of Shoppers Drug Mart, which was created by the artist Sylvain Liu. It also uses some of the same private-label brands, such as Life Brand and Quo.

Koffler sold Shoppers Drug Mart to Imasco in 1986, before spinning off into an independent company in 2000; but gained its status a publicly-traded corporation in 2001. In 2014, Brampton-based Loblaw Companies acquired Shoppers Drug Mart for $12.4 billion in cash and stock. By early 2016, Shoppers had over 1,300 locations in Canada.

== Overview ==
In addition to its retail formats, the company owns and operates several specialty services. This includes Shoppers Drug Mart Specialty Health Network, a provider of specialty drug distribution, pharmacy and comprehensive patient support services, and MediSystem Technologies Inc., a provider of pharmaceutical products and clinical services to long-term care facilities and retirement communities.

A new store concept, Wellwise, launched in fall 2017 as a single Toronto location; it sells healthy living products for seniors. In February 2018, wellwise.ca launched, making it Shoppers Drug Mart's second e-commerce site, in addition to beautyboutique.ca. Many locations offer prescription delivery free of charge, employing a fleet of corporate-owned vehicles. Wellwise was sold to Verillium Health Care in early 2025..

It is a participant in the voluntary Scanner Price Accuracy Code managed by the Retail Council of Canada.

== History ==
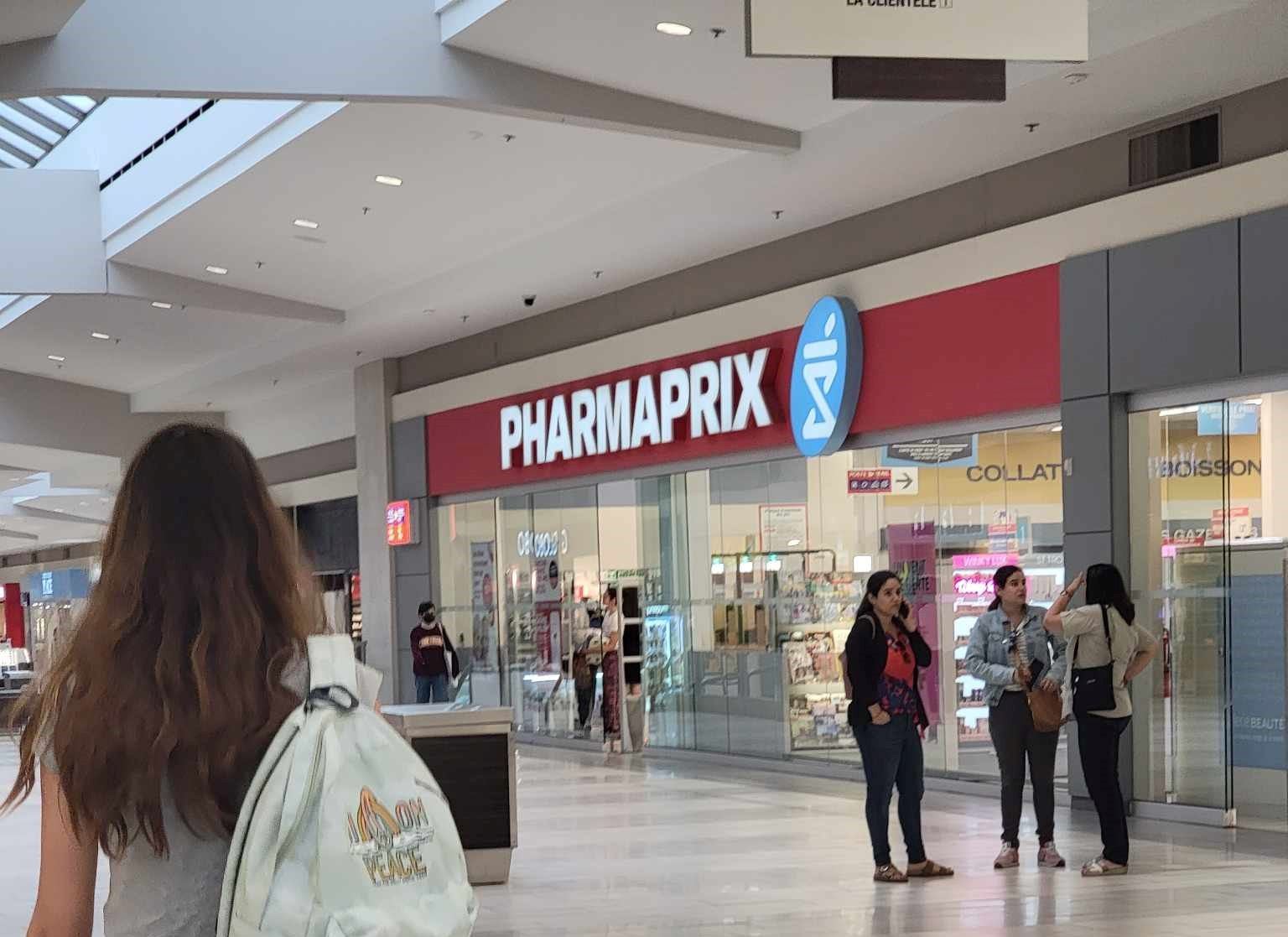
A Pharmaprix in the Carrefour Angrignon mall in LaSalle, Quebec

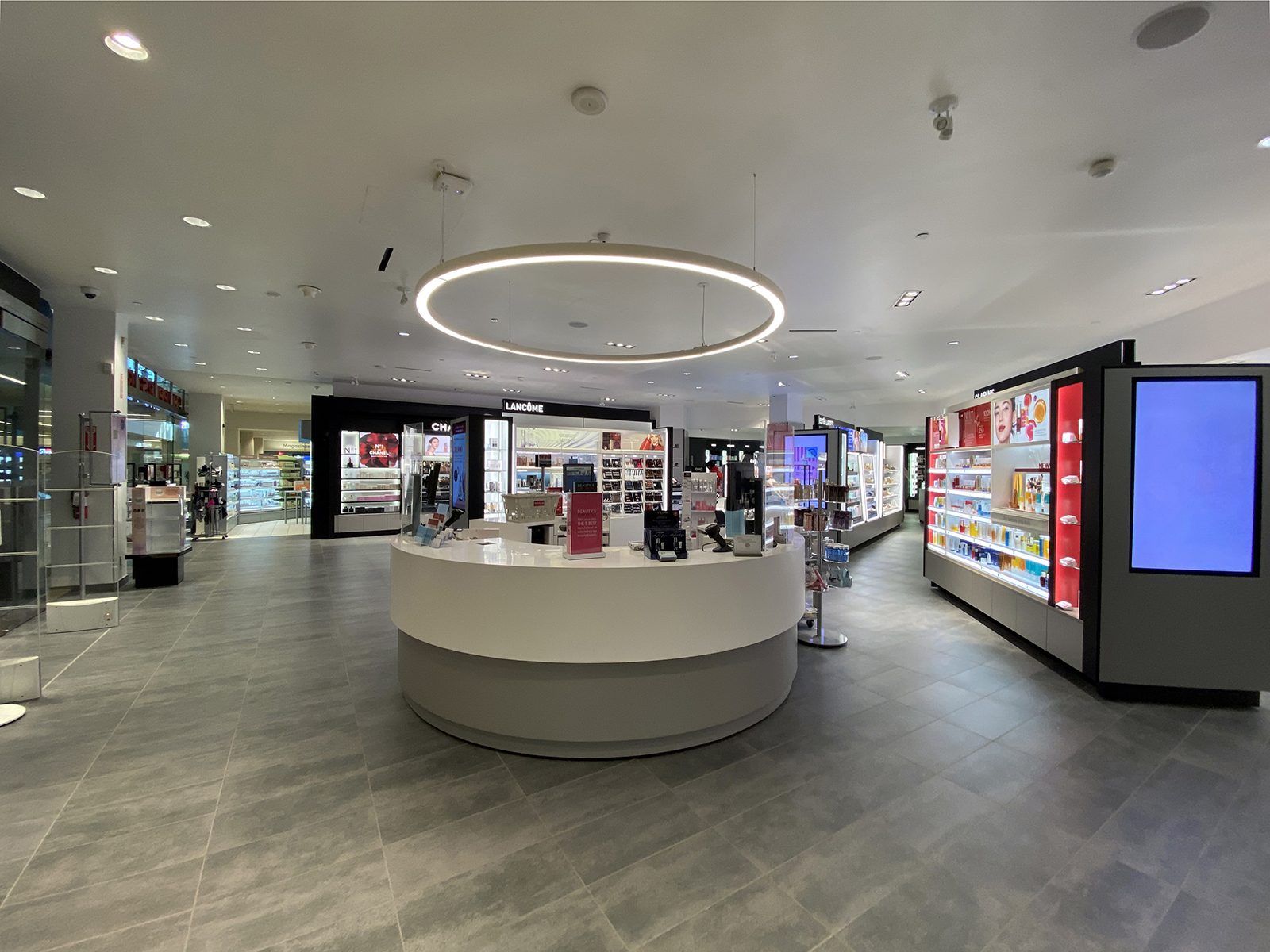
Beauty Boutique by Shoppers Drug Mart in Square One Shopping Mall

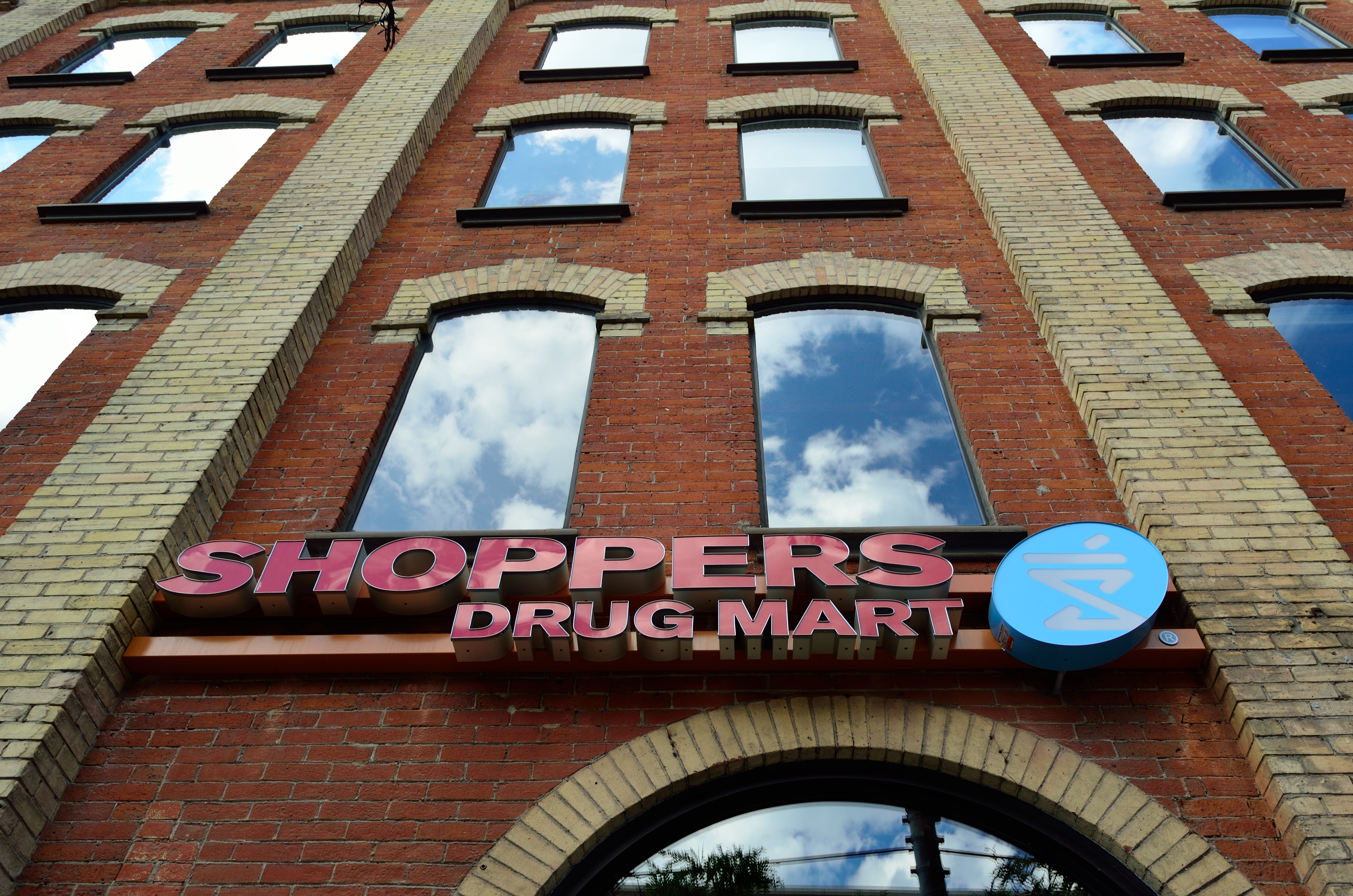
Shoppers Drug Mart in a historic building in downtown Toronto

=== Early years (1962–1986) ===
At the age of twenty, Murray Koffler inherited two Koffler's Drugs pharmacies from his father, Leon Koffler, the original at 376 College Street and a second store on Bathurst Street north of St. Clair Avenue West. Koffler also opened a suburban location at Don Mills Centre on the advice of E.P. Taylor. By 1962, Koffler's had grown to a chain of 17 pharmacies, which he renamed "Shoppers Drug Mart" in the 1970s. The first store named "Shoppers Drug Mart" was at Shoppers World Danforth from which it derived the name.

Koffler revamped the concept of the 20th century drug store in Canada by removing the soda fountain and emphasizing the dispensary, requiring his pharmacists to wear starched white coats as a symbol of their professionalism. In the mid-1950s, he began acquiring other drug stores and organized them around a then-novel franchising concept: pharmacist associates would own and operate their own stores within the system and share in the profits. In 1968, Shoppers Drug Mart grew to 52 stores in Ontario by merging with 33 Plaza Drugstores. In 1971, Shoppers Drug Mart purchased 87 Cunningham Drug Stores in British Columbia and Alberta. In 1972, Koffler and the Steinberg grocery chain together launched the Pharmaprix pharmacy chain in Quebec. Koffler later bought out Steinberg's 50% stake in 1979, to take full control of Pharmaprix. In 1974, Lord's Supervalue Pharmacies 26 stores in Atlantic Canada joined the Shoppers Drug Mart family. In 1986, Shoppers Drug Mart bought Super X Drugstores, an Ontario-area chain of 72 stores. In 1986, Shoppers Drug Mart also purchased the J.W. Crooks Pharmacy stores in Thunder Bay, Ontario (Mayor James White Crooks). In 1992, the company bought up the Western Canadian chain Pinder's Drugs, and followed this in 1995, with a chain of 24 Bi-Rite Drug Stores based in western Canada. Also in 1995, Shoppers Drug Mart acquired 135 Big V Drugstores. In 1996, the first Shoppers Home Health Care store opened.

=== Imasco era and expansion (1986–2013) ===
When Koffler retired in 1986, he sold the chain to Imasco. That same year, David Bloom, a former Shoppers Drug Mart pharmacist, was appointed chief executive officer of the company. Bloom would lead the organization until retiring in 2001, having devoted a total of 35 years of service to the company. During David Bloom's tenure, Shoppers doubled its number of stores, quadrupled its sales and increased profit ten-fold. David Bloom also launched the Shoppers Optimum loyalty program in 2000.

In 2000, after Imasco Limited had been taken over by BAT Industries (formerly British American Tobacco), Shoppers was sold to a consortium of institutional investors including KKR, Bain Capital, DLJ Merchant Banking Partners, Charlesbank Capital Partners, Ontario Teachers' Pension Plan, CIBC Capital Partners and Shoppers Drug Mart's senior management and pharmacist/owners.

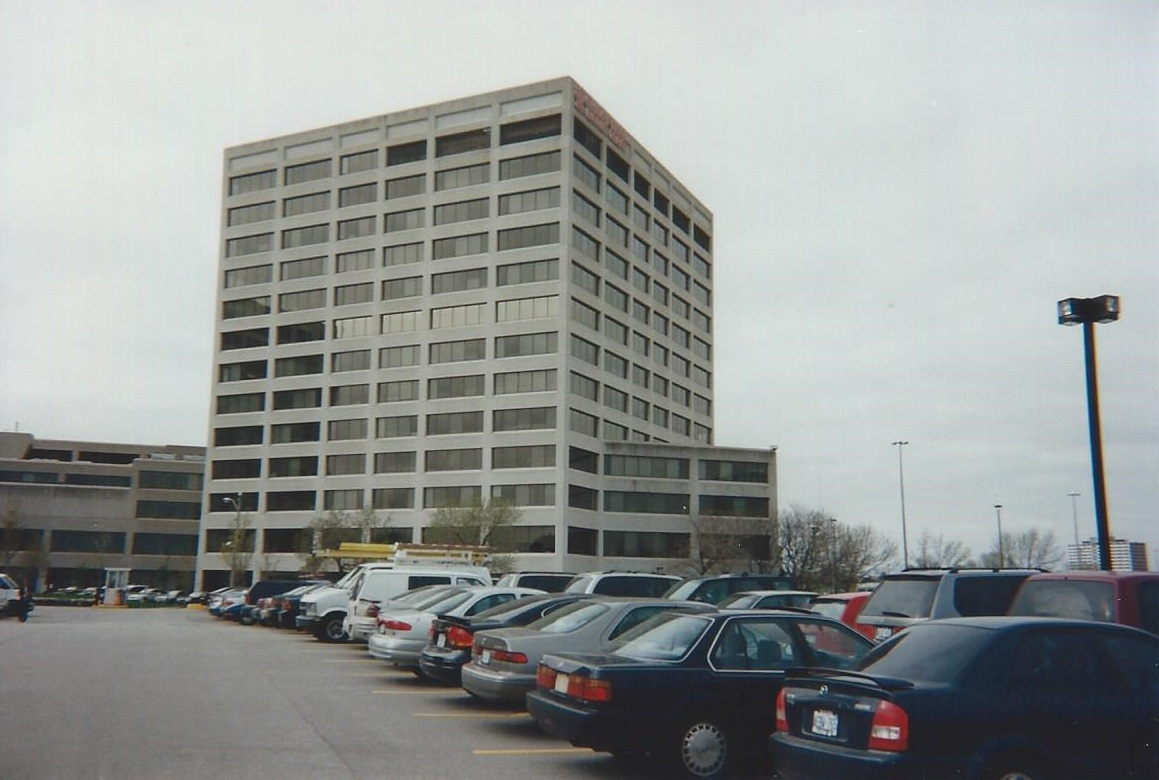
Shoppers Drug Mart corporate headquarters building in North York, Toronto, as seen in 2002

In 2001, Glenn Murphy was appointed chairman and chief executive officer of the company. In November of that same year, Shoppers Drug Mart Corporation was publicly listed on the Toronto Stock Exchange.

In 2002, Shoppers Drug Mart introduced its first large format stores, with more space and a stronger focus on cosmetic products. Typically the cosmetics section faces the entrance, with the pharmacy counter at the back and a convenience food section, called Food Essentials, near the front cash. In most suburban areas, this new format takes the form of new or relocated store, typically stand-alone big-box locations as opposed to smaller mall or strip-mall locations.

On April 26, 2007, the 1000th Shoppers Drug Mart store opened in Toronto, Ontario.

In recent years, the chain has been moving to decrease its reliance on pharmaceutical sales and increase sales on food and cosmetics. The store claims that in 2012, it increased its market share in food and that 51% of purchases now come from non-pharmaceutical items.

=== Loblaw Companies ownership (2013–present) ===
On July 15, 2013, Loblaw Companies announced that it would acquire Shoppers Drug Mart for $12.4 billion, pending shareholder and regulatory approval. The deal was approved by the Competition Bureau on March 21, 2014, and completed on March 28, 2014. Prior to the sale to Loblaws, U.S.-based Walgreens had considered acquiring Shoppers Drug Mart in the past.

As a result of the merger, Loblaw began to stock its President's Choice and No Name store brands at Shoppers Drug Mart locations. Likewise, Shoppers' "Life" brand products began to be stocked in Loblaw grocery stores. The company also extended a pilot of introducing additional grocery products (including produce) at selected stores.

In Summer 2018, Shoppers Drug Mart opened its flagship Toronto, Ontario location at Yonge-Dundas Square (now Sankofa Square) in the space formerly occupied by Hard Rock Cafe.

In September 2018, Health Canada approved the chain as a licensed medical marijuana producer. The company does not intend to actually produce the product but had signed supply arrangements with companies such as Aurora Cannabis, Aphria, Inc., MedReleaf Corp. (owned by Aurora) and Tilray Inc., pending approval of its application for a license. On 17 October 2018, cannabis became legal for recreational use across Canada, but Shoppers has not given any indication that it has an interest in recreational sales. Its parent company, Loblaw Companies Ltd., had applied to (and won the right to) sell the product for such use in Newfoundland and Labrador.

== Rewards program ==
Customers can earn points through the PC Optimum program, formerly Shoppers Optimum. Members collect points that may be redeemed on purchases within the store. Shoppers Optimum members receive 15 points for every dollar spent at the store, excluding the purchase of lottery, tobacco products, transit tickets and passes, prescription items, any products containing codeine, Canada Post products, and gift cards that are not for the chain itself. Events for bonus point collecting and redemption (e.g., 20× the points, bonus redemption) are regularly held.

On November 8, 2017, Shoppers Drug Mart's parent company, Loblaw, merged the program with Loblaw supermarket's PC Plus reward program into PC Optimum effective February 1, 2018. Similarly to Optimum, customers receive 15 points per dollar spent at Shoppers Drug Mart locations (adjusted up to account for differences in point scale between Shoppers Optimum and PC Plus).

== Advertising and promotion ==
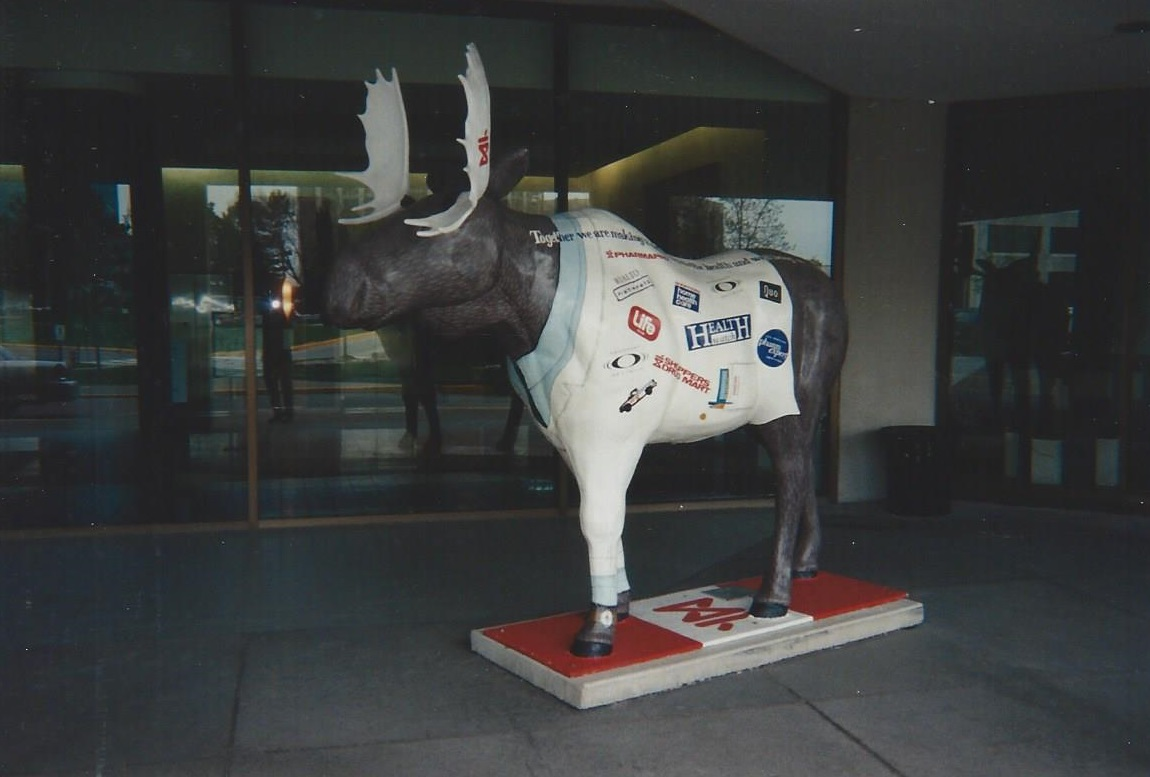
Moose statue covered with Shoppers Drug Mart related brands and logos, as seen in 2002

- "You're Gonna Be Happy"—early to mid 1980s
- "Everything You Want in a Drugstore"—1980s and the early 1990s, featuring Bea Arthur as spokeswoman
- "Take Care of Yourself"—2000 to 2002
- "Your Life Store"—2002 to present (French variant: Vive la vie!, i.e. "Long live life!"), to go with its own featured "Life" brand
- "Gifts Made Easy"—holiday campaign, 2006 to present

== Controversies ==
In 2024, Shoppers Drug Mart was criticized for enacting sales quotas on pharmacists for MedsCheck, a government sponsored program in Ontario. MedsCheck reimburses healthcare providers for medication reviews, allowing for a maximum billing of $75 per patient, which led to the profitability of enacting sales targets. CBC News reported that approximately 1.4 million dollars was billed to the province for a week in February 2024. A class action lawsuit was filed against the company in regards to these quotas.
